= National Register of Historic Places listings in Middlesex County, Connecticut =

Location of Middlesex County in Connecticut

This is a list of the National Register of Historic Places listings in Middlesex County, Connecticut.

There are 128 properties and districts listed on the National Register of Historic Places in Middlesex County, Connecticut, United States. Tabulated here are 92 places; see National Register of Historic Places listings in Middletown, Connecticut for 36 more; the oyster sloop Christeen was located in Middlesex County when listed in 1991, but relocated to Oyster Bay, New York in 1992. Including those in Middletown, there are three National Historic Landmarks among the listings.

The locations of National Register properties and districts for which the latitude and longitude coordinates are included below, may be seen in an online map.

Contents: Counties and municipalities in Connecticut

Fairfield (city of Bridgeport | town of Greenwich | city of Stamford) | Hartford (city of Hartford | town of Southington | town of West Hartford | town of Windsor) | Litchfield | Middlesex (city of Middletown) | New Haven (city of New Haven) | New London | Tolland | Windham

This National Park Service list is complete through NPS recent listings posted July 17, 2026.

== Current listings (excluding Middletown) ==
	Name on the Register	Image	Date listed	Location	City or town	Description
1	Belltown Historic District	Belltown Historic District	October 28, 1985 (#85003543)	Roughly Main Street between West High Street and CT 16, and portions of Cross Streets West High, Barton Hill-Summit, and Skinner Street; 41°34′23″N 72°30′17″W	East Hampton	
2	Black Horse Tavern	Black Horse Tavern	December 1, 1978 (#78002851)	Southeast of Old Saybrook at 175 North Cove Road; 41°17′20″N 72°21′20″W	Old Saybrook	
3	BOC Site		October 15, 1987 (#87001218)	Address Restricted	Haddam	Archaeological site documented as part of the Lower Connecticut River Valley Woodland Period Archaeological TR. 0.1 acre.
4	Bridge No. 1132	Bridge No. 1132	September 29, 2004 (#04001091)	CT 80 at the Hammonasset River; 41°21′26″N 72°36′45″W	Killingworth	Open-spandrel concrete arch bridge built in 1934; extends into Madison in New Haven County
5	Bridge No. 1603	Bridge No. 1603	July 29, 1993 (#93000641)	Devil's Hopyard Road (Route 434) over an unnamed brook in Devil's Hopyard State Park; 41°29′02″N 72°20′33″W	East Haddam	Near Chapman Falls.
6	Bridge No. 1604	Bridge No. 1604	July 29, 1993 (#93000642)	Devil's Hopyard Road (Route 434) over unnamed brook in Devil's Hopyard State Park; 41°28′39″N 72°20′31″W	East Haddam	
7	Bridge No. 1605	Bridge No. 1605	July 29, 1993 (#93000643)	Devil's Hopyard Road (Route 434) over Muddy Brook in Devil's Hopyard State Park; 41°28′32″N 72°20′31″W	East Haddam	
8	Benjamin Bushnell Farm	Benjamin Bushnell Farm	May 10, 1990 (#90000761)	52 Ingham Hill Road; 41°19′49″N 72°25′14″W	Essex	
9	Elisha Bushnell House	Elisha Bushnell House	November 29, 1978 (#78002850)	1445 Boston Post Road; 41°17′14″N 72°24′31″W	Old Saybrook	
10	Bushnell-Dickinson House	Bushnell-Dickinson House	August 28, 2013 (#13000289)	170 Old Post Road; 41°17′12″N 72°24′11″W	Old Saybrook	
11	Camp Bethel	Camp Bethel	December 11, 2007 (#07001246)	124 Camp Bethel Road; 41°27′11″N 72°28′24″W	Haddam	
12	Hubbell Carter House	Hubbell Carter House	November 29, 2018 (#100003147)	2 Carter Hill Road; 41°18′52″N 72°30′59″W	Clinton	
13	Centerbrook Congregational Church	Centerbrook Congregational Church	February 12, 1987 (#87000113)	51 Main Street; 41°21′06″N 72°24′53″W	Essex	
14	Clinton Village Historic District	Clinton Village Historic District	July 29, 1994 (#94000788)	Along Cemetery Road, Church, East Main and Liberty Streets, Old Post Road, and Waterside Lane; 41°16′36″N 72°31′07″W	Clinton	
15	Commerce Street Historic District		May 9, 2024 (#100009867)	10-34, 38, 52, 58, odd #s 59-105, 109-125, 140-142 Commerce Street, 7-9 Fisk Avenue; 41°16′23″N 72°31′40″W	Clinton	
16	Comstock's Bridge	Comstock's Bridge	January 1, 1976 (#76001978)	Comstock Bridge Road; 41°33′11″N 72°26′57″W	East Hampton	
17	Comstock-Cheney Hall	Comstock-Cheney Hall	April 15, 1982 (#82003769)	103 Main Street; 41°20′55″N 72°26′32″W	Essex	Better known as Ivoryton Theatre, the first summer theatre in the U.S.?
18	Connecticut Valley Railroad Roundhouse and Turntable Site	Connecticut Valley Railroad Roundhouse and Turntable Site	April 28, 1994 (#94000395)	Off Main Street in Fort Saybrook Monument Park in Saybrook Point; 41°17′02″N 72°21′05″W	Old Saybrook	
19	Cypress Cemetery	Cypress Cemetery	October 2, 2018 (#100003006)	100 College Street; 41°17′02″N 72°21′19″W	Old Saybrook	
20	D & H Scovil Industrial Historic District		July 11, 2024 (#100010491)	11 Candlewood Hill Road, 11 and 12 Scovil Road, 529 Brainard Hill Road; 41°29′34″N 72°34′10″W	Haddam	
21	Charles Daniels House	Charles Daniels House	February 19, 1988 (#88000094)	43 Liberty Street; 41°24′27″N 72°27′33″W	Chester	
22	Amasa Day House	Amasa Day House	September 22, 1972 (#72001315)	33 Plains Road; 41°30′07″N 72°27′09″W	East Haddam	
23	Deep River Freight Station	Deep River Freight Station	December 21, 1994 (#94001445)	152 River Street; 41°23′38″N 72°25′37″W	Deep River	
24	Deep River Town Hall	Deep River Town Hall	January 1, 1976 (#76001977)	Route 80 and Route 154; 41°23′06″N 72°26′11″W	Deep River	
25	Doane's Sawmill/Deep River Manufacturing Company	Doane's Sawmill/Deep River Manufacturing Company	February 21, 1985 (#85000313)	Horse Hill and Winthrop Roads; 41°20′17″N 72°29′02″W	Westbrook and Deep River	
26	Doris (Sailing yacht)	Doris (Sailing yacht)	May 31, 1984 (#84001108)	Connecticut River off River Road; 41°23′00″N 72°23′34″W	Deep River	
27	Jedidiah Dudley House	Jedidiah Dudley House	April 12, 1982 (#82004339)	Springbrook Road; 41°18′54″N 72°21′51″W	Old Saybrook	
28	East Haddam Historic District	East Haddam Historic District	April 29, 1983 (#83001273)	CT 149, Broom, Norwich, Creamery, Lumberyard, and Landing Hill Roads; 41°27′23″N 72°27′45″W	East Haddam	
29	Samuel Eliot House	Samuel Eliot House	November 9, 1972 (#72001316)	500 Main Street; 41°17′02″N 72°22′08″W	Old Saybrook	
30	Emmanuel Church	Emmanuel Church	August 5, 1999 (#99000924)	50 Emmanuel Church Road; 41°23′34″N 72°36′33″W	Killingworth	
31	Essex Freight Station	Essex Freight Station	April 19, 1994 (#94000337)	1 Railroad Avenue; 41°21′00″N 72°24′18″W	Essex	
32	Fenwick Historic District	Fenwick Historic District	April 13, 1995 (#95000437)	Roughly, along Agawam, Neponset and Pettipaug Avenues; 41°16′14″N 72°21′23″W	Old Saybrook	
33	Goodspeed Opera House	Goodspeed Opera House	July 30, 1971 (#71000901)	6 Main Street; 41°27′07″N 72°27′47″W	East Haddam	
34	Haddam Center Historic District	Haddam Center Historic District	February 9, 1989 (#89000012)	Roughly 2.5 miles (4.0 km) along Walkley Road and CT 154/Saybrook Road; 41°28′46″N 72°30′55″W	Haddam	
35	Hadlyme North Historic District	Hadlyme North Historic District	December 8, 1988 (#88002686)	Roughly bounded by CT 82, Town Street, Banning Road, and Old Town Street; 41°25′45″N 72°24′25″W	East Haddam	
36	Hammonasset Paper Mill Site	Hammonasset Paper Mill Site	February 23, 1996 (#96000128)	Green Hill Road at the Hammonasset River; 41°19′27″N 72°35′36″W	Killingworth	Extends into Madison.
37	Gen. William Hart House	Gen. William Hart House	November 9, 1972 (#72001318)	350 Main Street; 41°17′14″N 72°22′31″W	Old Saybrook	
38	James Hazelton House	James Hazelton House	November 16, 1988 (#88001468)	23 Hayden Hill Road; 41°28′46″N 72°31′06″W	Haddam	
39	Higganum Landing Historic District	Higganum Landing Historic District	December 10, 2018 (#100003206)	40-68 Landing Road, 2-14 Landing Road South; 41°27′00″N 72°32′55″W	Haddam	
40	High Street Historic District		August 10, 2020 (#100005404)	7 Central Avenue, 19-114 High Street, and 1-62 John Street; 41°16′52″N 72°31′37″W	Clinton	
41	Hill's Academy	Hill's Academy	August 23, 1985 (#85001831)	22 Prospect Street; 41°21′14″N 72°23′34″W	Essex	
42	Indian Hill Avenue Historic District	Indian Hill Avenue Historic District	May 26, 1983 (#83001274)	Main Street and Indian Hill Avenue to the River; 41°35′54″N 72°37′23″W	Portland	
43	Ivoryton Historic District	Ivoryton Historic District	April 15, 2014 (#13000895)	Roughly bounded by Main, North Main, Oak, Blake & Summit Streets, Park Road & Comstock Avenue; 41°20′54″N 72°26′27″W	Essex	Ivoryton, Connecticut
44	James Pharmacy	James Pharmacy	August 5, 1994 (#94000845)	2 Pennywise Lane; 41°17′09″N 72°22′35″W	Old Saybrook	Home and workplace of Anna Louise James (1886–1977), the first African-American woman pharmacist in the state.
45	Lay-Pritchett House	Lay-Pritchett House	October 11, 1978 (#78002854)	North of Westbrook on CT 145; 41°19′55″N 72°29′35″W	Westbrook	
46	Daniel and Mary Lee House	Daniel and Mary Lee House	April 3, 1991 (#91000365)	Pepperidge Road East of Jobs Pond Road; 41°34′47″N 72°34′59″W	Portland	
47	Little Haddam Historic District	Little Haddam Historic District	August 1, 1996 (#96000783)	Roughly bounded by East Haddam Road, Orchard Road, and Town Street; 41°28′44″N 72°26′48″W	East Haddam	
48	David Lyman II House	David Lyman II House	February 6, 1986 (#86000149)	5 Lyman Road; 41°29′47″N 72°42′43″W	Middlefield	
49	Thomas Lyman House	Thomas Lyman House	November 20, 1975 (#75001921)	105 Middlefield Road; 41°29′18″N 72°41′16″W	Durham	
50	Lynde Point Lighthouse	Lynde Point Lighthouse	May 29, 1990 (#89001469)	Southeastern terminus of Sequassen Avenue; 41°16′16″N 72°20′38″W	Old Saybrook	
51	Main Street Historic District	Main Street Historic District	October 24, 1985 (#85003389)	Roughly bounded by Nooks Hill Road, Prospect Hill Road, Wall and West Streets and New Lane, and Stevens Lane and Main Street; 41°36′07″N 72°38′56″W	Cromwell	
52	Main Street Historic District	Main Street Historic District	September 4, 1986 (#86002837)	Roughly Maple Avenue and Main Street between Talcott Lane and Higganum Road; 41°28′26″N 72°40′51″W	Durham	
53	Marlborough Street Historic District	Marlborough Street Historic District	March 20, 2012 (#12000130)	58, 64, 69, 70, 78, 88, & 92 Marlborough Street; 41°34′15″N 72°38′05″W	Portland	
54	Middle Haddam Historic District	Middle Haddam Historic District	February 3, 1984 (#84001112)	Moodus and Long Hill Roads; 41°33′11″N 72°33′06″W	East Hampton	
55	Middle Haddam School	Middle Haddam School	October 18, 2019 (#100004545)	12 Schoolhouse Lane; 41°33′09″N 72°32′52″W	East Hampton	
56	Middletown Upper Houses Historic District	Middletown Upper Houses Historic District	July 27, 1979 (#79002620)	CT 99; 41°35′19″N 72°38′28″W	Cromwell	Historic district of area that was in Middletown, until it was split to Cromwell in 1851
57	Millington Green Historic District	Millington Green Historic District	July 25, 1996 (#96000782)	Roughly bounded by Millington, Tater Hill, Haywardville, and Old Hopyard Roads; 41°29′06″N 72°21′28″W	East Haddam	
58	North Cove Historic District	North Cove Historic District	July 22, 1994 (#94000766)	Roughly North Cove Road from Church Street to the Connecticut River and adjacent properties on Cromwell Place; 41°17′13″N 72°21′32″W	Old Saybrook	
59	Oak Lodge	Oak Lodge	September 4, 1986 (#86001734)	Western Side of Schreeder Pond, Chatfield Hollow State Park; 41°22′11″N 72°35′27″W	Killingworth	
60	Old Saybrook South Green	Old Saybrook South Green	September 3, 1976 (#76001984)	Old Boston Post Road, Pennywise Lane, Main Street; 41°17′17″N 72°22′36″W	Old Saybrook	
61	Old Saybrook Town Hall and Theater	Old Saybrook Town Hall and Theater	June 21, 2007 (#07000558)	300 Main Street; 41°17′26″N 72°23′11″W	Old Saybrook	Now known as the Katharine Hepburn Cultural Arts Center
62	Old Town Hall	Old Town Hall	February 23, 1972 (#72001310)	On the Green between Liberty Street and Goose Hill Road; 41°24′25″N 72°27′09″W	Chester	
63	Oriole Rockshelter		October 15, 1987 (#87001222)	Address Restricted	East Haddam	
64	Parker House	Parker House	November 29, 1978 (#78002853)	680 Middlesex Turnpike; 41°19′25″N 72°22′30″W	Old Saybrook	
65	Parmelee House	Parmelee House	May 15, 2007 (#07000417)	4 Beckwith Road; 41°23′03″N 72°35′13″W	Killingworth	
66	Portland Brownstone Quarries	Portland Brownstone Quarries	May 16, 2000 (#00000703)	Brownstone Avenue and Silver Street; 41°34′30″N 72°38′36″W	Portland	Quarried since 1690, source of vast quantities of brownstone for New York City, Philadelphia, Boston, other urban areas' buildings.
67	Pratt House	Pratt House	August 23, 1985 (#85001824)	19 West Avenue; 41°21′13″N 72°23′40″W	Essex	
68	Dr. Ambrose Pratt House	Dr. Ambrose Pratt House	November 9, 1972 (#72001311)	Pratt Street; 41°24′01″N 72°26′43″W	Chester	
69	Caleb Pratt House		March 28, 2024 (#100010112)	26 Gates Road; 41°20′27″N 72°23′29″W	Essex	
70	Humphrey Pratt Tavern	Humphrey Pratt Tavern	November 7, 1972 (#72001320)	287 Main Street; 41°17′18″N 72°22′35″W	Old Saybrook	
71	Pratt, Read and Company Factory Complex	Pratt, Read and Company Factory Complex	August 30, 1984 (#84001117)	Main Street between Bridge and Spring Streets and 5 Bridge Street; 41°23′25″N 72°26′22″W	Deep River	
72	Rapallo Viaduct	Rapallo Viaduct	August 21, 1986 (#86002728)	Flat Brook and former Air Line Railroad right-of-way 41°34′19″N 72°28′19″W	East Hampton	
73	Roaring Brook I Site		July 31, 1987 (#87001220)	Address Restricted	East Haddam	Archaeological site documented as part of the Lower Connecticut River Valley Woodland Period Archaeological TR. Less than 1 acre.
74	Roaring Brook II Site		July 31, 1987 (#87001221)	Address Restricted	East Haddam	Archaeological site documented as part of the Lower Connecticut River Valley Woodland Period Archaeological TR. Less than 1 acre.
75	Sage-Kirby House	Sage-Kirby House	April 29, 1982 (#82003767)	93 Shunpike Road; 41°36′41″N 72°40′36″W	Cromwell	
76	Saybrook Breakwater Lighthouse	Saybrook Breakwater Lighthouse	May 29, 1990 (#89001474)	Southern terminus of Saybrook Jetty at the mouth of the Connecticut River; 41°15′47″N 72°20′35″W	Old Saybrook	
77	Seventh Sister	Seventh Sister	July 31, 1986 (#86002103)	67 River Road; 41°25′25″N 72°25′53″W	East Haddam and Lyme	Now Gillette Castle State Park.
78	Shore Line Electric Railway Power House	Shore Line Electric Railway Power House	June 20, 2019 (#100004086)	5 Clark Street; 41°18′51″N 72°21′39″W	Old Saybrook	
79	Steamboat Dock Site	Steamboat Dock Site	April 1, 1982 (#82003768)	67 Main Street; 41°21′04″N 72°23′06″W	Essex	Now the Connecticut River Museum
80	William Stevens House	William Stevens House	May 30, 1985 (#85001163)	131 Cow Hill Road; 41°18′17″N 72°32′45″W	Clinton	
81	William Tully House	William Tully House	March 15, 1982 (#82004340)	135 North Cove Road; 41°17′21″N 72°21′26″W	Old Saybrook	
82	Villa Bella Vista	Villa Bella Vista	December 28, 2000 (#00001560)	7 Old Depot Road; 41°24′12″N 72°26′28″W	Chester	
83	William Ward Jr. House	William Ward Jr. House	February 19, 1988 (#88000109)	137 Powder Hill Road; 41°30′14″N 72°43′47″W	Middlefield	
84	Warner House	Warner House	February 19, 1987 (#87000174)	307 Town Street; 41°27′12″N 72°26′27″W	East Haddam	
85	Jonathan Warner House	Jonathan Warner House	December 19, 1978 (#78002855)	47 Kings Highway; 41°25′00″N 72°26′27″W	Chester	
86	Westbrook Town Center Historic District	Westbrook Town Center Historic District	October 16, 2017 (#100001732)	Old Clinton at Hammock Roads, Boston Post Road at Bellstone Avenue, Trolley Road, Boston Post Road at Goodspeed Drive; 41°17′04″N 72°26′44″W	Westbrook	
87	White-Overton-Callander House	White-Overton-Callander House	May 21, 2014 (#13000896)	492 Main Street; 41°35′15″N 72°37′43″W	Portland	House museum of the Portland Historical Society
88	Ambrose Whittlesey House	Ambrose Whittlesey House	August 23, 1985 (#85001830)	14 Main Street; 41°17′51″N 72°22′37″W	Old Saybrook	
89	John Whittlesey Jr. House	John Whittlesey Jr. House	October 26, 1984 (#84002644)	40 Ferry Road; 41°18′49″N 72°21′33″W	Old Saybrook	
90	Wickham Road Historic District	Wickham Road Historic District	July 25, 1996 (#96000781)	Roughly the Junction of Wickham and Geoffrey Roads; 41°30′16″N 72°22′46″W	East Haddam	
91	Williams and Stancliff Octagon Houses	Williams and Stancliff Octagon Houses	April 22, 1976 (#76001985)	26 and 28 Marlborough Street; 41°34′21″N 72°38′20″W	Portland	
92	Working Girls' Vacation Society Historic District	Working Girls' Vacation Society Historic District	June 3, 1994 (#94000557)	60, 64, and 66 Mill Road; 41°26′31″N 72°23′43″W	East Haddam	

== Formerly listed, and other status ==
	Name on the Register	Image	Date listed	Location	City or town	Description
1	Christeen (oyster sloop)	Christeen (oyster sloop)	December 4, 1991 (#91002060)	Essex Harbor; 41°21′03″N 72°23′04″W	Essex	Sloop that was stationed in Essex Harbor when NRHP-listed, later moved to Oyster Bay, New York.

== See also ==
- List of National Historic Landmarks in Connecticut
- National Register of Historic Places listings in Connecticut
