= Doane's Sawmill/Deep River Manufacturing Company =

- U.S. National Register of Historic Places
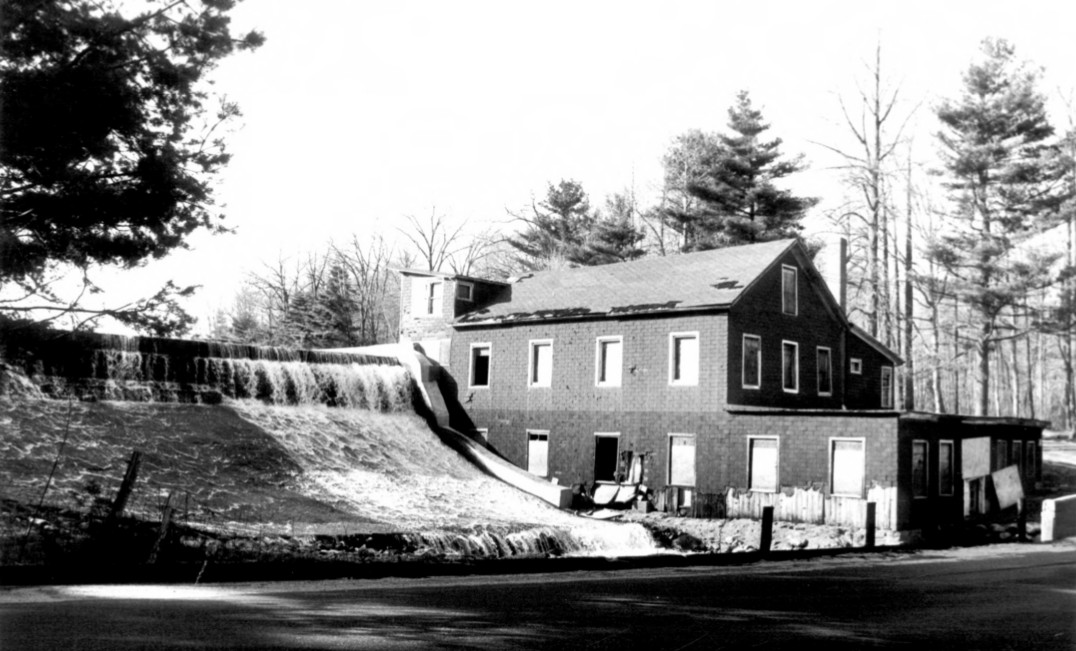
- 1984 photo of the mill

- Location within Connecticut Location within the United States
- Location: Horse Hill and Winthrop Roads, Westbrook, Connecticut and Deep River, Connecticut
- Coordinates: 41°20′17″N 72°29′2″W
- Area: less than 1 acre (0.40 ha)
- Built: c.1875 and 1933
- NRHP reference No.: 85000313
- Added to NRHP: February 21, 1985

Messerschmidt Pond Wildlife Management Area is a tract of land in Westbrook and Deep River, Connecticut, adjacent to Cockaponset State Forest. The area includes the millpond and former site of the Deep River Manufacturing Company (also known as Doane's Sawmill and the Messerschmidt Hardware Mill), which preserved a variety of historic manufacturing machinery until its demolition in 1987. The mill and an associated shed and dam were listed on the National Register of Historic Places in 1985.

== History ==
The mill on the site was originally built in about 1875 by Russell Doane, a local farmer, as a sawmill. It was powered by the water behind an earthen dam built across the Falls River, which forms a millpond of about 73 acres (30 ha). The extensive logging of the area that Doane anticipated did not materialize, and the mill was foreclosed on in 1884. It passed through a succession of owners before being sold to Charles Messerschmidt, Sr., who owned an adjacent farm, in 1914. Messerschmidt derived most of his income from the farm and ran the mill part-time. In 1929, he and three other men formed a partnership which bought the Deep River Manufacturing Company.

Deep River Manufacturing had begun in the 1860s as J.A. Smith & Co., a firm which made hooks and other bent-wire objects in a shop in Deep River. In 1885, the firm was bought by Henry Snell and Mathewson Potter, who used its equipment to manufacture crochet hooks, knitting needles, and button hooks. The partnership operated until 1927, when it was sold to one of the employees, but went bankrupt within a year; the eclipse of high-button shoes and gloves in fashion had largely destroyed the company's market. Ernest Prann and other local men formed the Deep River Manufacturing Company and bought the firm, but sold the company to another partnership, which included Messerschmidt, Sr., in 1929. Messerschmidt's son, Charles, Jr., who had obtained a bookkeeping certificate from Baypath Institute in 1928, was also brought into the partnership.

The company did not prosper during the Great Depression. Unable to afford the mortgage on the Deep River location, the equipment was moved in 1933 to Messerschmidt's largely idle sawmill. One by one, the partners dropped out until only the Messerschmidts were left. They drew no salary during those years, as all the company's receipts went towards paying the dozen employees. On the edge of collapse, Deep River was saved by the National Silver Co., of New York City, which offered to buy all the nutcrackers and nut picks the company could make. (The company would later produce lobster forks as well.) Charles Messerschmidt, Jr., was placed in charge of converting the company's equipment to make these products.

Charles' mechanical work was highly successful. Though he lacked formal training as a mechanical engineer, a natural mechanical inclination sharpened by boyhood on the farm and in the sawmill allowed him to create unique machinery to cheaply manufacture his products. His achievements including building a knurling machine for utensil stock from a mixture of home-made and purchased parts, and the extensive modification of a power press to stamp nutcracker teeth. In addition to the mechanical changes within, a shed was built across the road from the mill in about 1935 so that the products could be nickel plated. Manufacturing continued at the mill, using the original machinery, until 1974 or 1976. In 1970, two waste lagoons were dug on the property for disposal of the nickel waste, and the dam was patched with concrete during the 1970s.

Ownership of the site, including the millpond, passed to the Connecticut Department of Environmental Protection in 1982 or 1983. Abandoned drums found near the mill in 1982 led to the removal of several drums and tanks of wastes and sludges. The mill, the plating shed, and the dam were placed on the National Register of Historic Places in 1985. However, the DEP demolished the mill in 1987 and the plating shed in 1988. Though some soils on the property have been contaminated by PCBs and metals, a preliminary investigation and site assessment in 1995 concluded that there was, at the time, no need to remove additional material from the site.

== Description ==
The area now consists of a 77-acre (31 ha) or 82-acre (33 ha) pond created by impounding the Falls River with an earthen dam. The dam is up to 22 feet (6.7 m) high, with a rubble core and a stone spillway now faced with concrete. The dam and the remains of the millrace incorporated into it are the only remaining component from the site's NRHP listing.

A boat launch is located on the opposite side of the pond.

=== Mill ===
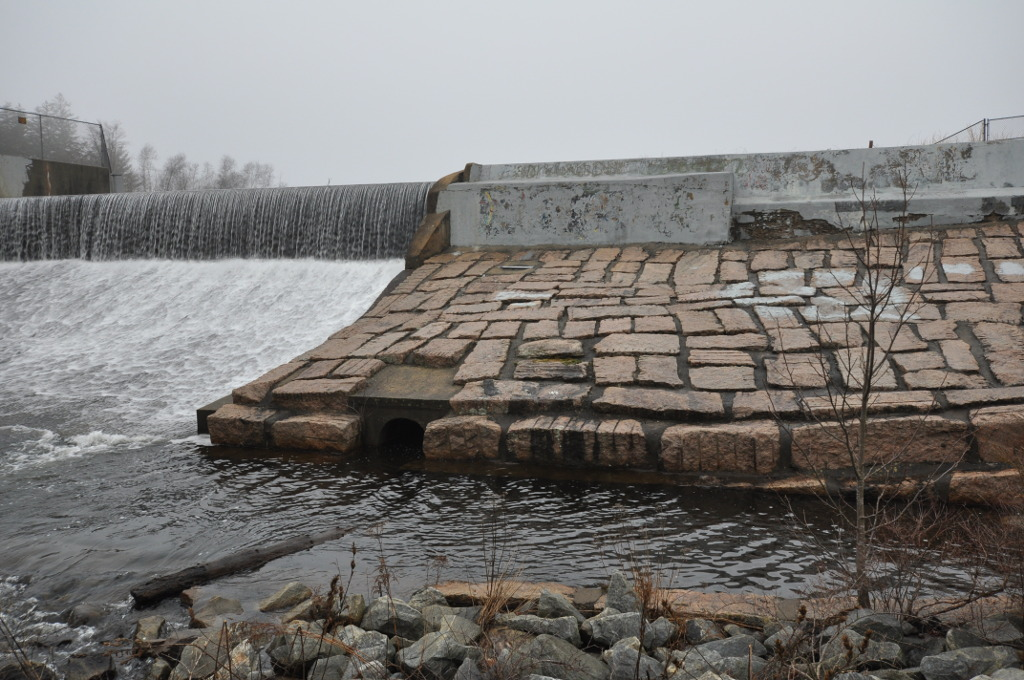
The site of the mill; the mill race is the pipe near the bottom of the stone field.

The mill, demolished in 1987, was a gable-roofed, chestnut timber-framed structure 2½ stories high, built on the edge of the dam. In later years, additions on three of the four sides were incorporated and the mill was covered in asphalt shingles. Although augmented by steel bolts, the building retained treenails in its framing until its demise.

The machinery was left inside the building after the mill closed, with the exception of footpresses for riveting. It drew its power from a turbine beneath the building, which powered a direct current generator. The electricity from the generator drew a motor that turned a line shaft, to which the machinery was attached by belting. The machinery present included three power presses, one of them extensively modified by Messerschmidt; a knurling machine, built by Messerschmidt; two multiple-spindle screw machines; and seven swaging machines, as well as machinery and hand tools for metalworking in a toolroom contained in an addition to the building.

== See also ==
- National Register of Historic Places listings in Middlesex County, Connecticut
