= Lay-Pritchett House =

Historic house in Connecticut, United States

- U.S. National Register of Historic Places
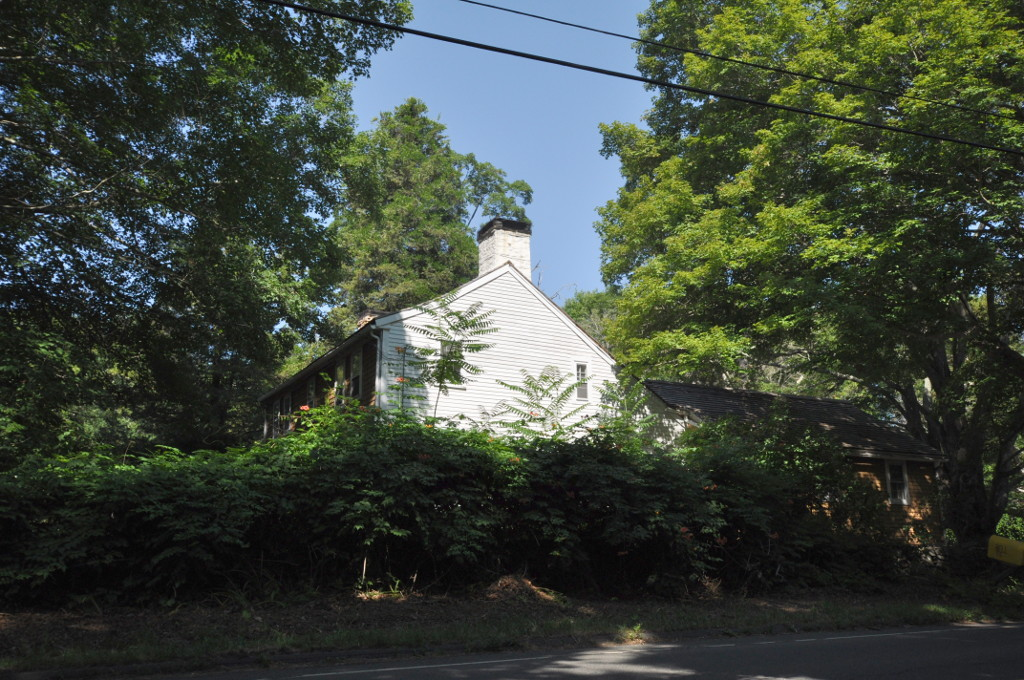

- Location within Connecticut Location within the United States
- Location: North of Westbrook on CT 145, Westbrook, Connecticut
- Coordinates: 41°19′55″N 72°29′35″W
- Area: 2.8 acres (1.1 ha)
- Built: c. 1737 and 1789
- Architectural style: Colonial, Saltbox
- NRHP reference No.: 78002854
- Added to NRHP: October 11, 1978

The Lay-Pritchett House is a historic house on Stevenstown Road (Connecticut Route 145) in Westbrook, Connecticut. Built about 1737 and enlarged several times since, it is distinctive for retaining its core elements in their original configuration and without significant alteration. The house was listed on the National Register of Historic Places in 1978.

== Description and history ==
The Lay-Pritchett House stands in a rural setting in northern Westbrook, oriented facing south on a 3-acre (1.2 ha) parcel on the west side of Stevenstown Road (Connecticut Route 145), just south of its junction with Pritchett Lane. It is a two-story wood-frame structure, five bays wide, with two chimneys, and a leanto section giving it a typical New England saltbox appearance. A modern ell extends further to the rear. The interior follows a center hall plan, with two rooms on either side of the hall. The interior finishes are almost entirely original on the ground floor, with hand-hewn exposed beams, vertical lapped-board wainscoting, and plaster above. Doors and their hardware appear to be original as well.

Traditionally described as the oldest house in the Patchogue area of Westbrook, the present main block was probably built in stages at several points in the 18th century. It was originally attached to an even older structure, traditionally dated to 1648 and demolished c. 1891, whose large chimney now forms one of those in the main block. Most of this construction was done by members of the Lay family, who have a long history in Westbrook.

== See also ==
- National Register of Historic Places listings in Middlesex County, Connecticut
