= Tully House =

Tully House may refer to:

- William Tully House, Old Saybrook, Connecticut, USA
- Tullie House Museum and Art Gallery Trust, Carlisle, England
