= 1737 in architecture =

The year 1737 in architecture involved some significant events.

== Buildings and structures ==
=== Buildings ===
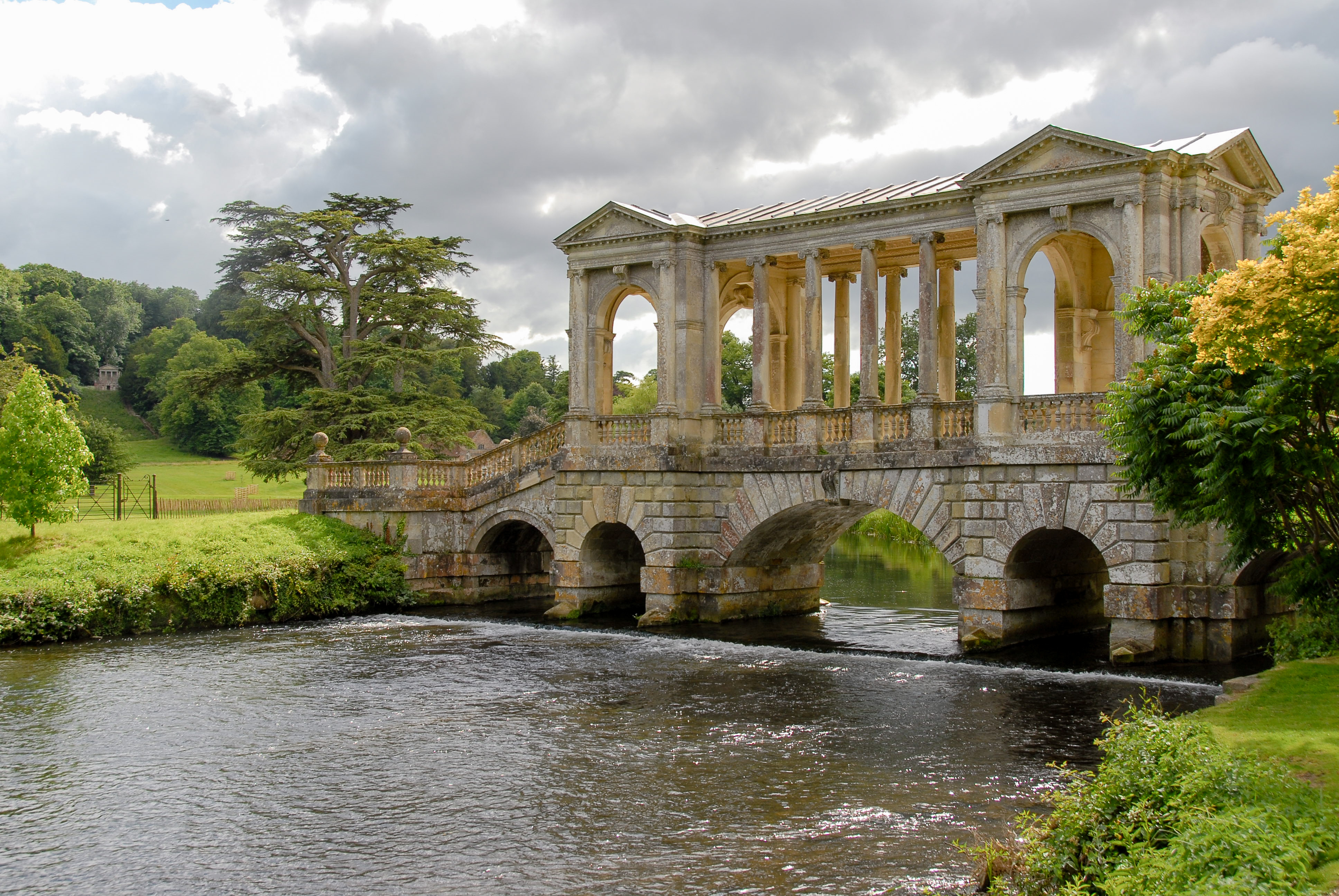
Palladian Bridge, Wilton House

- November 4 – The Teatro di San Carlo in Naples (Italy), designed by Giovanni Antonio Medrano under the direction of Charles VII of Naples, officially opens
- Palladian Bridge, Wilton House (England), designed by Roger Morris, is completed.
- Fuerte San Miguel (Uruguay).
- Samuel Eliot House in Old Saybrook, Connecticut.
- Black Swan Hotel, Devizes, England.
- The ceiling of the chapter house in Porto Cathedral is decorated.
- Approximate date – New Nostell Priory in Yorkshire, England, designed by James Paine, begun.

== Publications ==
- Andrea Palladio – I quattro libri dell'architettura

== Births ==
- June 7 – Jacques Gondouin, French architect and designer (died 1818)
- September 8 – Samuel Wyatt, English architect and engineer (died 1807)

== Deaths ==
- March 8 – Domenico Rossi, Swiss-Italian architect (born 1657)
- December 21 – Alessandro Galilei, Florentine mathematician, architect and theorist (born 1691)
