= Marlborough Street =

Marlborough Street (sometimes shortened to Marlboro Street) can refer to the following:

== United Kingdom ==
- Great Marlborough Street in London, often called Marlborough Street
  - Marlborough Street Magistrates Court, located here
- Marlborough Street (Bristol) in the centre of Bristol, United Kingdom
- Marlborough Street (Derry) in Derry, Northern Ireland, United Kingdom
- V8 Marlborough Street in Milton Keynes, Buckinghamshire, United Kingdom, formally Marlborough Street

== Elsewhere ==
- Marlborough Street (Boston) in the Back Bay area of Boston, Massachusetts, United States
- Marlborough Street, Dublin in Dublin, Ireland
  - Marlborough Street Bridge, design name of what is now the Rosie Hackett Bridge
  - Marlborough Street Training College, located here
- Marlborough Street (Roseau) in Roseau, Dominica
- Marlborough Street Historic District in Portland, Connecticut, United States
- Marlborough Street railway station near Adelaide, Australia
