= Working Girls' Vacation Society Historic District =

Historic district in Connecticut, United States

- U.S. National Register of Historic Places
- U.S. Historic district
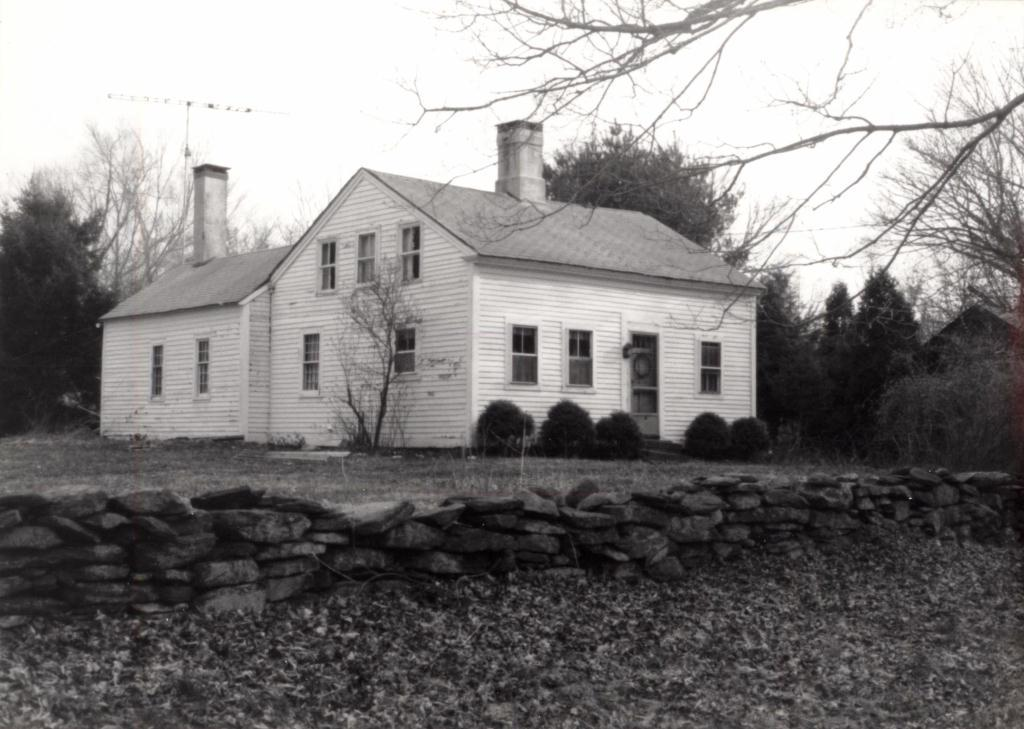
- The Phebe Howell House

- Location within Connecticut Location within the United States
- Location: 60, 64 and 66 Mill Road, East Haddam, Connecticut
- Coordinates: 41°26′31″N 72°23′43″W
- Area: 27 acres (11 ha)
- NRHP reference No.: 94000557
- Added to NRHP: June 3, 1994

The Working Girls' Vacation Society Historic District is a 27-acre (11 ha) historic district in East Haddam, Connecticut that was listed on the National Register of Historic Places in 1994. It is significant by dint of the properties having been owned, during 1892–1945, by the Working Girls' Vacation Society of New York City, and used as a summer retreat for working women from the city.

The society is similar to the Young Women's Christian Association, founded in 1866, in that it is one of many organizations intending to "minister to the 'temporal, moral and religious welfare of self-supporting women.' Led by enlightened upper class philanthropist/reformers such as copper heiress Grace Dodge, a national network of "working girls' clubs" formed in the 1880s. Their mission primarily was to protect the morality of working women, rather than to improve the conditions of the workplace (note 4); their means included the creation of opportunities for social intercourse, self-improvement (education), and recreation in a morally uplifting setting. The New York Working Girls' Club, founded by Dodge in 1883 and the first of its kind in the nation, maintained, for example, a clubhouse with a library and extensive series of lectures, classes, and social events (note 5). The employment-related health needs of working girls were not ignored. The Working Girls' Vacation Society of New York, an offshoot of the Working Girls' Club, was founded in 1883 to provide summer vacations in the country for women with demonstrated health problems. The founders of the society included prominent upper-class women and social workers (note 6). In a pattern repeated in other cities, the Vacation Society made available low-cost stays generally of two weeks in duration at rural locations (note 7)."

A total of 411 working girls were assisted by the society in the summer of 1884. By 1915 the society had created several retreats in Connecticut and served 1450.

The district includes three side-by-side properties on a rural road in East Haddam, Connecticut, with three houses and three barns.

When listed, the district included six contributing buildings and one non-contributing building. Three of the six are residences. The Phebe Howell House (c.1835), is constructed with pegged post-and-beam framing, and shows what may be its original clapboard siding. It and the Charles Howell House (c.1825) are constructed on granite ashlar foundations. The latter's doorway is flanked by fluted pilasters. A vernacular bungalow house (c.1915) is the other.

The three other contributing buildings are 19th-century, wood-frame barns. The one at 66 Mill Road (photograph 5 in accompanying photos) "is similar in size and design to the ell on the Phebe Howell House, which tends to confirm oral history that this barn was formerly attached to the rear of the Charles Howell House."

DiNapoli, writing in 1892, describes the working girls' plight.

The association renamed in 1950 to become the Katherine Herbert Fund, named after the 1885 founder of the society. In 1974 it merged with the Stony Wold Corporation, an organization that had focused upon tuberculosis, to become the Stony Wold-Herbert Fund.

== See also ==
- Fernside-Vacation House for Working Girls, Princeton, Massachusetts, also NRHP-listed
- National Register of Historic Places listings in Middlesex County, Connecticut
