= Menunketesuck Island =

- Location within Connecticut
- Coordinates: 41°15′50″N 72°27′52.14″W
- Country: United States
- State: Connecticut
- County: Middlesex
- Town: Westbrook
- Elevation: 3.3 ft (1 m)

Population
  - Total: 0

Menunketesuck Island, also known as Menunketesuck Point, is an island in Long Island Sound located in the town of Westbrook in Middlesex County, Connecticut, US.

== Geography ==
Menunketesuck Island consists of approximately 4.6 acres of land, though the actual acreage varies according to the tides. Although the elevation of the island reaches as much as 8 to 10 feet towards the center, the island perimeter consists largely of tidal flats, shoals and sandbars which are exposed at low tide and submerged during high tide.

The narrow island measures approximately 2,100 feet long and 170 feet wide during high tide; length increases to roughly 2,700 feet during low tide, with some portions of the island growing up to 270 feet wide.

During high tide, the northern end of the island lies approximately 700 feet from the shoreline. The distance from the mainland decreases to between 100 and 200 feet during low tide as expansive sandbars and tidal flats are exposed. The island is separated from the mainland by exceptionally shallow water during low tide, such that it can easily be accessed on foot. During high tide, the depth of the water increases to approximately 5 to 8 feet deep.

== Conservation ==
Menunketesuck Island is part of the Salt Meadow Unit of the Stewart B. McKinney National Wildlife Refuge and was designated by the National Audubon Society as an "Important Bird Area", as it hosts populations of water birds including the least tern, American oystercatcher, great egret, glossy ibis, Black-crowned night heron and various gull species. Ground nesting birds like terns and oystercatchers nest directly on the island's shore in the sand and rocks. Their nests are especially susceptible to disturbance by predators, domestic cats, domestic dogs, and humans. The long-legged wading birds, such as egrets and ibises, use the island's trees to nest and raise their young. The surrounding waters, mudflats and nearby marshes constitute a tremendous ecosystem for birds like these to find food, shelter and space.

Since becoming a National Wildlife Refuge, Menunketesuck Island has been closed to visitors. In addition, dogs, kites and drone flights are strictly prohibited.
