= Black Horse Tavern (Old Saybrook, Connecticut) =

Historic tavern in Connecticut

- U.S. National Register of Historic Places
- U.S. Historic district – Contributing property
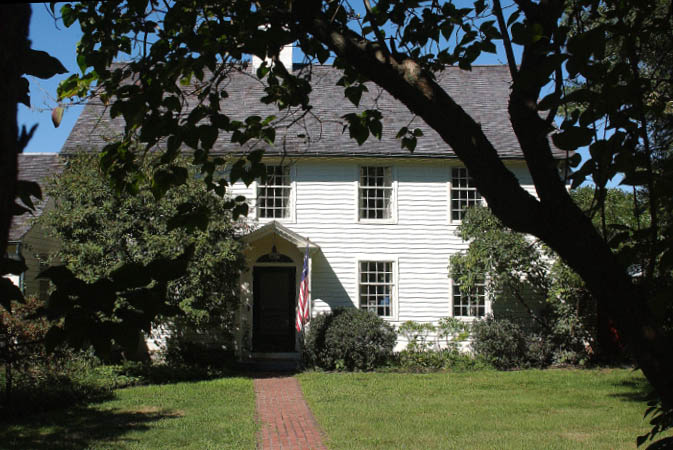

- Location within Connecticut Location within the United States
- Location: South East of Old Saybrook at 175 North Cove Road, Old Saybrook, Connecticut
- Coordinates: 41°17′20″N 72°21′20″W
- Area: 1.3 acres (0.53 ha)
- Built: c. 1712
- Architect: John Burrows
- Part of: North Cove Historic District (ID94000766)
- NRHP reference No.: 78002851

Significant dates
- Added to NRHP: December 1, 1978
- Designated CP: July 22, 1994

The Black Horse Tavern is a historic building at 175 North Cove Road in Old Saybrook, Connecticut, built around 1712 by John Burrows. The 2 1/2-story wood-frame structure is one of the few early 18th-century buildings still standing in Connecticut, built on land that was among the earliest settled in the area. It was listed on the National Register of Historic Places in 1978.

== Description and history ==
The Black Horse Tavern is located near the eastern end of Saybrook Point, a peninsula dividing North and South Coves on the west side of the Connecticut River near its mouth at Long Island Sound. The tavern's location is a short distance west of the site of Fort Saybrook, the first element of the Saybrook Colony built in 1635. The tavern is a 2 1/2-story timber-framed structure, with a gabled roof and slightly off-center chimney. Its main facade is four bays wide, with the entrance in the center-left bay; the chimney is positioned behind the entrance. The entrance features an original vertical board door and is flanked by pilasters and topped by a half-round fanlight, sheltered by a gabled portico. The interior layout has a large front-to-back chamber to the right of the chimney, and a parlor and kitchen to the left and behind.

The tavern was built about 1712 by John Burrows on land originally deeded to John Clark Sr. in 1644. The North Cove was then coming into use as a shipbuilding center, and the tavern operated by Burrows would have served its workers and travelers moving on the river. North Cove Road was then also the major road following the western shore of the river, another source of passing travelers. The building served as a tavern under a variety of owners until 1924, and it is now a private residence.

== See also ==
- List of the oldest buildings in Connecticut
- National Register of Historic Places listings in Middlesex County, Connecticut
