= BOC Site =

Archaeological site in Connecticut, US

- U.S. National Register of Historic Places
- Location: Haddam, Connecticut
- Area: 0.1-acre (400 m^{2})
- MPS: Lower Connecticut River Valley Woodland Period Archaeological TR
- NRHP reference No.: 87001218
- Added to NRHP: October 15, 1987

The BOC Site is a 0.1-acre (400 m^{2}) archeological site in Haddam, Connecticut that was listed on the National Register of Historic Places in 1987 for its potential to yield information. Its address is listed as restricted on the NRHP database.

== See also ==
- National Register of Historic Places listings in Middlesex County, Connecticut
