= Daniel and Mary Lee House =

Historic house in Connecticut, United States

- U.S. National Register of Historic Places
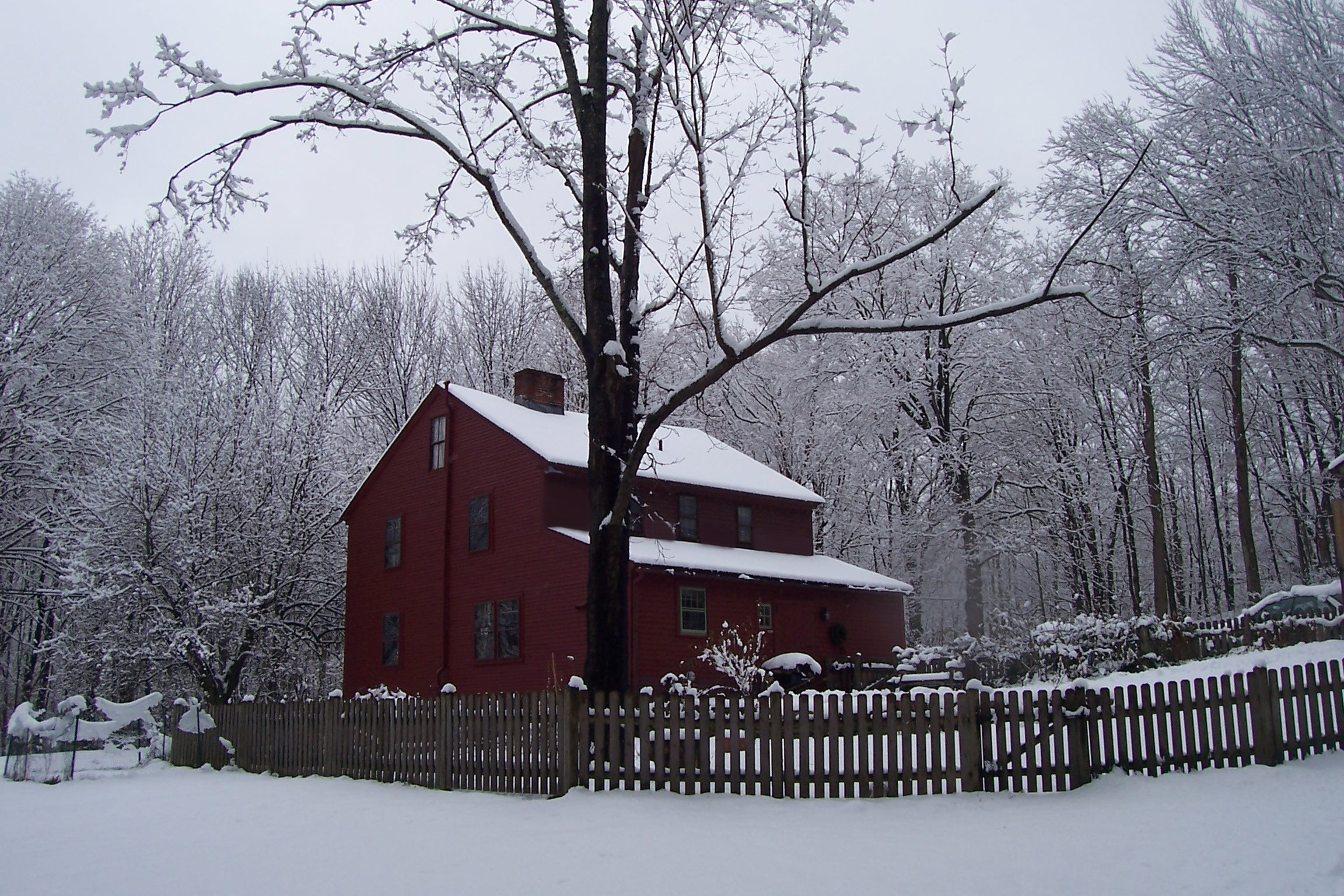
- Daniel and Mary Lee House

- Location within Connecticut Location within the United States
- Location: Pepperidge Road East of Jobs Pond Road, Portland, Connecticut
- Coordinates: 41°34′47″N 72°34′59″W
- Area: 2 acres (0.81 ha)
- Built: 1770
- Architectural style: Georgian, Federal, Postmedieval English
- NRHP reference No.: 91000365
- Added to NRHP: April 3, 1991

The Daniel and Mary Lee House is a historic house on Pepperidge Road in Portland, Connecticut. Built about 1774, it is a well-preserved example of rural vernacular colonial-era residential architecture, with later Federal period alterations. It was listed on the National Register of Historic Places in 1991.

== Description and history ==
The Daniel and Mary Lee House is located in a rural setting of eastern Portland, on the north side of Pepperidge Road east of Jobs Pond Road. It is a two-story wood-frame structure, three bays wide, with a central chimney. A single story shed-roof ell, part of the house's original construction, extends to the rear. It has a side-hall plan inside, an atypical layout for traditional 18th-century houses, and its chimney is set further back than usual. It is rendered even more unusual by architectural evidence that it was once about six feet longer than it presently is. The long hall makes possible a longer-run main staircase with wide treads. Original period features include interior doors and hardware, horizontal board wainscoting in the dining room, and early 19th-century Federal period decorative elements.

The house was probably built in 1770, after James Stevenson gave his daughter Mary and her husband Daniel Lee two acres of land. It is the only known house of its type to survive in the town. The Lees lived in the house, raising ten children, until 1794, when it was sold (along with a larger parcel of adjacent land) to Daniel White. A later owner, Daniel Smith, probably made the Federal-style alterations; he operated a nearby tannery.

== See also ==
- National Register of Historic Places listings in Middlesex County, Connecticut
