= Indian Hill Avenue Historic District =

Historic district in Connecticut, United States

- U.S. National Register of Historic Places
- U.S. Historic district
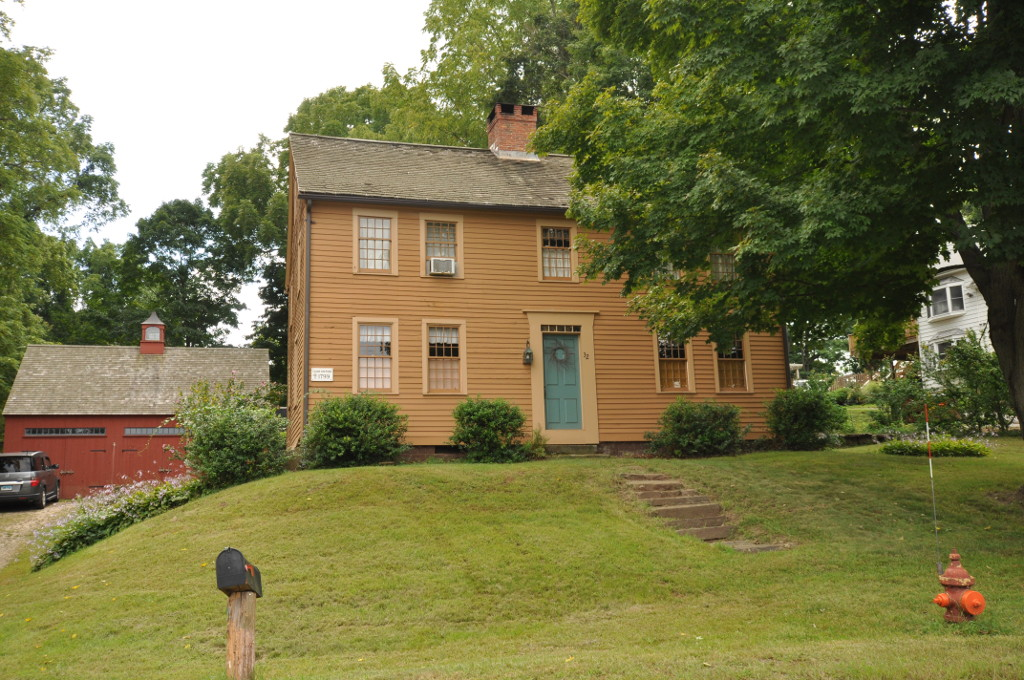

- Location within Connecticut Location within the United States
- Location: Main Street and Indian Hill Avenue to River, Portland, Connecticut
- Coordinates: 41°35′54″N 72°37′23″W
- Area: 35 acres (14 ha)
- Architect: Multiple
- Architectural style: Greek Revival and Late Victorian
- NRHP reference No.: 83001274
- Added to NRHP: May 26, 1983

The Indian Hill Avenue Historic District encompasses an 18th-century colonial shipbuilding village, overlaid on a historic and prehistoric Native American settlement, in Portland, Connecticut. Extending along Indian Hill Avenue north of Portland, the district includes a collection of 18th and early 19th-century buildings, and extensive archaeological evidence of Native American occupation (some supported by colonial-era and later documentation). The district was listed on the National Register of Historic Places in 1983.

== Description and history ==
The area that is now Portland belonged to the Wangunk people prior to the arrival of European colonists. The land in the Indian Hill area was among the last to be sold off by the Wangunks (in 1748 and 1765), who ended up merging with other regional tribes and eventually settled in Wisconsin. The Indian Hill area was documented into the 19th century as a Native American burying ground, and continues to be visited by Wangunk descendants. Various building projects in the area have on a number of occasions included reports of the exposed burials, and numerous surface-level Native artifacts have been found in the area.

The waterfront area on the Connecticut River was developed from an early date as a shipyard, a use that continues with the presence of a marina and boat service yard with more modern structures. The district's built infrastructure includes Greek Revival and Late Victorian architecture, and has Portland's largest concentration of 18th and early 19th-century architecture. When listed, the district included 17 contributing buildings (as opposed to 15 non-contributing buildings), two contributing sites and one contributing object. Among the contributing buildings are eight from the 1700s, including the Thomas Stevenson House was built c. 1766 and the Abiel Cheney-George Lewis, Jr., House built c.1785.

== See also ==
- National Register of Historic Places listings in Middlesex County, Connecticut
