= Marlborough Street Historic District =

Historic district in Connecticut, United States

- U.S. National Register of Historic Places
- U.S. Historic district
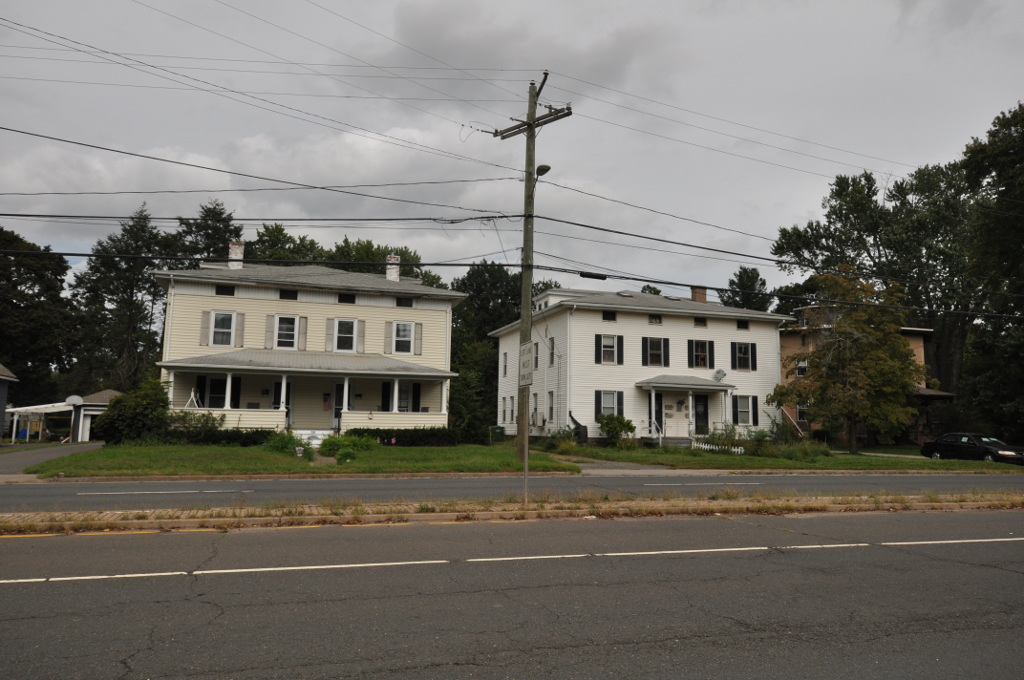

- Location within Connecticut Location within the United States
- Location: 58, 64, 69, 70, 78, 88, & 92 Marlborough Street, Portland, Connecticut
- Coordinates: 41°34′15″N 72°38′5″W
- Area: 35 acres (14 ha)
- Architect: Multiple
- Architectural style: Greek Revival, Octagon, Late Victorian, Colonial Revival
- NRHP reference No.: 12000130
- Added to NRHP: March 20, 2012

The Marlborough Street Historic District encompasses one of the finest collections of 19th-century residential architecture in Portland, Connecticut. Extending along Marlborough Street (Connecticut Route 66) east of Main Street, it includes twelve houses built between 1847 and 1900 in a variety of architectural styles. The district was listed on the National Register of Historic Places in 1983.

== Description and history ==
Marlborough Street is one of Portland's major thoroughfares, running southeasterly from Main Street and connecting neighboring Middletown to points east. Main Street (Connecticut Route 17A) historically separated the upper and lower classes of the community, whose economy was dominated by the large brownstone quarries between Main Street and the Connecticut River. Marlborough Street became the place where the business elite of the community built their homes in the late 19th century. Owners of the houses built here include members of the Brainerd family which controlled the quarries, and executives of their company.

The district's oldest house is the 1830 Hart-Jarvis House, a Greek Revival structure that was later owned by quarry owner Erastus Brainerd Sr. His son built the adjacent Italianate villa in 1852, which is one of the district's most sophisticated buildings and may have been designed by Henry Austin. Gilbert Stancliffe, another quarry executive, and his brother-in-law Joseph Williams built the Williams and Stancliff Octagon Houses, which are the only known pair of octagon houses inspired by Orson Squire Fowler. Most of these architecturally significant buildings line the northeastern side of the street; on the south side are a cluster of houses that were adapted for use as a private psychiatric hospital in 1938. That complex has in the late 2010s become the subject of redevelopment initiatives, while a number of the other buildings in the district are now used for professional offices rather than residences.

== See also ==
- National Register of Historic Places listings in Middlesex County, Connecticut
