= Belltown Historic District =

Historic district in Connecticut, United States

- U.S. National Register of Historic Places
- U.S. Historic district
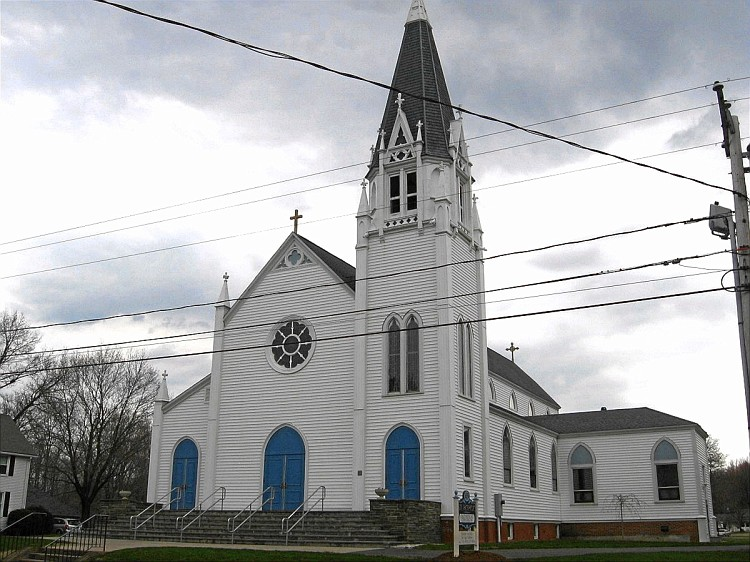
- St. Patrick's Church

- Location within Connecticut Location within the United States
- Location: Roughly Main Street between West High Street and CT 16, and portions of Cross Streets West High, Barton Hill-Summit, and Skinner Street, East Hampton, Connecticut
- Coordinates: 41°34′23″N 72°30′17″W
- Area: 145 acres (59 ha)
- Architectural style: Greek Revival, Late Victorian, Federal
- NRHP reference No.: 85003543
- Added to NRHP: October 28, 1985

The Belltown Historic District encompasses the historic commercial and industrial main village of East Hampton, Connecticut. Settled in the 18th century, the community flourished in the 19th century as a center of bell making, with numerous firms engaged in the trade. The town center is reflective of this 19th-century success, with a broad diversity of period architecture, as well as surviving elements of the bellmaking industry. The district was listed on the National Register of Historic Places in 1985.

== Description and history ==
The area that is now East Hampton was settled in 1739, and was incorporated in 1767. The town's economy was at first largely driven by shipbuilding and related interests, centered at Middle Haddam on the Connecticut River, but these were in decline by the early 19th century. William Barton, a native of Bloomfield, Connecticut, arrived in East Hampton in 1807, bringing with him the specialized knowledge of working brass for the manufacture of bells. He established a foundry, where he trained a whole generation of bellmakers whose work would fuel the town's economy. The Bevin Brothers, among those he trained, were the first to apply water power to the process, damming Pocotopaug Brook for the purpose. Their business continues to be a major presence in the town. By 1860, Belltown had 23 men listed as bell manufacturers.

The historic district has a spider-like configuration, anchored by a stretch of Main Street between West High and Edgerton Streets. Fingers of the district extend off of a number of side streets, which are typically lined with residential and industrial buildings. The district covers 145 acres (59 ha), and includes 145 contributing buildings, in a diversity of 19th-century architectural styles. Prominent elements include the surviving mill complexes of the bell makers and associated businesses, as well as four churches. There are also several industrial archaeological sites in the southern part of the district, where early and failed bellmaking businesses were once located.

== See also ==
- National Register of Historic Places listings in Middlesex County, Connecticut
- Belltown Historic District
