= Roaring Brook sites =

Archaeological sites in Connecticut, United States

- Roaring Brook I Site; Roaring Brook II Site
- U.S. National Register of Historic Places
- Location: Address Restricted, East Haddam, Connecticut
- Area: both have less than 1 acre (0.40 ha)
- MPS: Lower Connecticut River Valley Woodland Period Archaeological TR
- NRHP reference No.: 87001220 and 87001221
- Added to NRHP: July 31, 1987

Roaring Brook I Site and Roaring Brook II Site are two Middle to Late Woodland Period archeological sites in East Haddam, Connecticut, that were listed on the National Register of Historic Places in 1987.

The Roaring Brook cultural phase, associated with multiple sites in the vicinity, is dated to 2000–1250 BP (AD 1–750).

Both National Register listings are for areas of less than one acre. Surveys conducted during the 1980s located these, as well as other sites in the lower Connecticut Valley.

== See also ==
- National Register of Historic Places listings in Middlesex County, Connecticut
