= White-Overton-Callander House =

Historic house in Connecticut, United States

- U.S. National Register of Historic Places
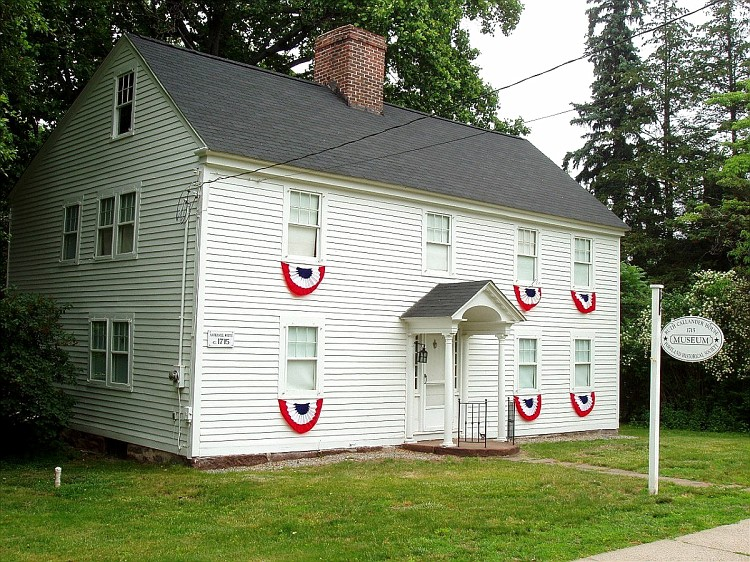

- Location within Connecticut Location within the United States
- Location: 492 Main Street, Portland, Connecticut
- Coordinates: 41.58761°N 72.62848°W
- Area: 0.5 acres (0.20 ha)
- Built: c. 1714
- Architectural style: Georgian
- NRHP reference No.: 13000896
- Added to NRHP: October 25, 2013

The White-Overton-Callander House is a historic house museum at 492 Main Street in Portland, Connecticut. Built in the 1710s, it is one of the community's oldest surviving buildings, built by Nathaniel White, one of the first proprietors of Middletown. Owned since 1997 by the local historical society, it is open for tours on some Sundays. It was listed on the National Register of Historic Places in 2013.

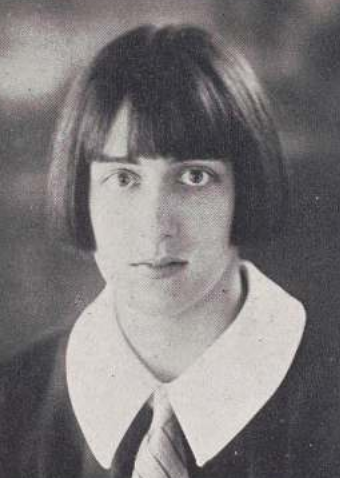
Ruth Ryan Callander, from the 1925 yearbook of Mount Holyoke College

== Description and history ==
The White-Overton-Callander House is located northeast of the town center of Portland, on the northwest side of Main Street (Connecticut Route 17A) near its Junction with William Street. It is a 2 1/2-story wood-frame structure, with a gabled roof, central chimney, and clapboarded exterior. Its main facade is four bays wide, with an asymmetrical placement that has the main entrance near the center of the facade, flanked by one bay on the left and two on the right. Trim elements are simple, except for the Colonial Revival gable-roofed portico sheltering the entrance. Architectural evidence suggests that the building was once symmetrical, with the rightmost bay a later addition. A single-story hip-roof ell extends to the rear.

Nathaniel White was one of the first English colonists to arrive in the area that is now Portland and Middletown, settling in 1650 in the "Upper Houses" of Middletown that is now Cromwell. Early settlement was on the west side of the Connecticut River, and in 1653 the proprietors began allocating land on the east side of the river for agricultural use. White was granted land in 1693 that had originally formed part of reservation land for Native Americans, and it is there that this house was built by his grandson, Nathaniel White II. It is believed to be the fourth house built in what is now Portland, and it was probably built in the years immediately after the elder White's death in 1711. Like his grandfather, the younger White was also active in civic affairs.

The house remained in the hands of White's descendants until 1918. One prominent late 18th-century owner was Seth Overton, who was active in procuring supplies for the Continental Army during the American Revolutionary War, and oversaw the construction of the USS Connecticut in 1799. The house was bequeathed to the Portland Historical Society by Ruth Ryan Callander on her death in 1997.

== See also ==
- National Register of Historic Places listings in Middlesex County, Connecticut
