= Bushnell-Dickinson House =

Historic house in Connecticut, United States

- U.S. National Register of Historic Places
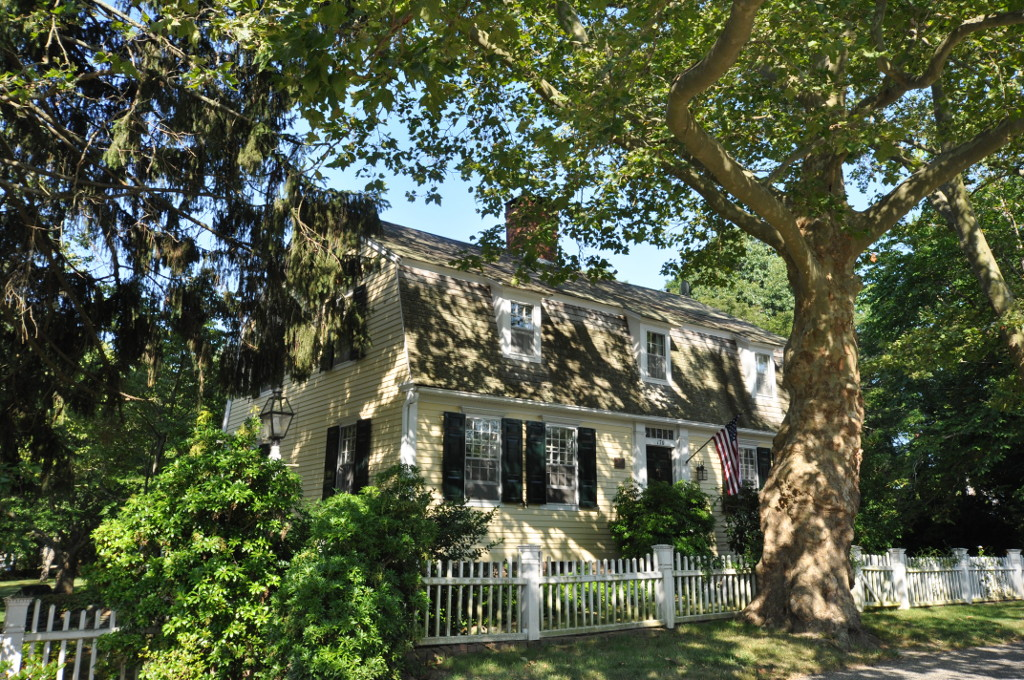

- Location within Connecticut Location within the United States
- Location: 170 Old Post Road, Old Saybrook, Connecticut
- Coordinates: 41°17′12″N 72°24′11″W
- Area: 2 acres (0.81 ha)
- Built: 1790
- Architect: Bushnell, Phineas
- Architectural style: Federal
- NRHP reference No.: 13000289
- Added to NRHP: August 28, 2013

The Bushnell-Dickinson House is a historic house at 170 Old Post Road in Old Saybrook, Connecticut. With a construction history dating to about 1790, it is a fine local example of Federal period residential architecture. The house was listed on the National Register of Historic Places in 1978.

== Description and history ==
The Bushnell-Dickinson House is located in a residential area in western Old Saybrook, on the south side of Old Post Road, between Meadowood Lane and the current alignment of the Boston Post Road (U.S. Route 1). It is a one-and-a-half-story wood-frame structure, with a gambrel roof, central chimney, and clapboarded exterior. Its main facade is five bays wide, with a center entrance flanked by fluted pilasters and topped by a four-light transom window. Three shed-roof dormers project slightly from the steep face of the roof. The interior follows a typical center chimney plan, with a narrow entrance vestibule with a window staircase, parlor and hall on either side of the chimney, and the kitchen at the rear, with small chambers in each of the rear corners. The interior retains original wide pine floors, paneled walls, wainscoting, and original door latches and mounting hardware.

The house was built about 1790 by Phineas Bushnell, descended from one of the area's early settlers. The house stands on what was, until about 1800, the main east–west road through Old Saybrook. The house remained in the hands of Bushnell's descendants (who married into the locally politically prominent Dickinson family) until 1934. It was given a thorough but sympathetic restoration in 1958, which included the use of hand-forged reproduction hardware in some places.

== See also ==
- National Register of Historic Places listings in Middlesex County, Connecticut
