= Connecticut Route 145 =

State highway in Middlesex County, Connecticut, US

Route 145
- Map of Middlesex County in southern Connecticut with Route 145 highlighted in red

Route information
- Maintained by CTDOT
- Length: 9.91 mi (15.95 km)
- Existed: 1932–present

Major junctions
- South end: US 1 in Clinton
- I-95 in Westbrook
- North end: Route 148 in Chester

Location
- Country: United States
- State: Connecticut
- Counties: Middlesex

Highway system
- Connecticut State Highway System; Interstate; US; State; SSR; SR; Scenic
| ← Route 142 | → Route 146 |

Route 145 is a state highway in the western part of the Connecticut River Estuary region of Connecticut. It connects Clinton center, through the village of Winthrop, to the town of Chester.

== Route description ==
Route 145 begins at an intersection with US 1 in Clinton and heads northeast, into Westbrook. In Westbrook, it turns north, intersecting with I-95 and passing by the Messerschmidt Pond Wildlife Area, before continuing into the town of Deep River. In Deep River, it continues north through the Winthrop section of the town, briefly overlapping Route 80 before continuing into Chester. In Chester, it continues north and northeast, curving around Chester Airport before ending at an intersection with Route 148 within the Cockaponset State Forest.

== History ==
Route 145 was established in 1932, following a loop around the Clinton Country Club and passing by the beach communities of Grove Beach and Clinton Beach within the town of Clinton. In 1959, it was extended as a tail north through Westbrook to the former Route 144 (now a town road called Bushy Hill Road) in Deep River. In 1942 or 1943, its northern end was relocated and extended northward to Route 80. In 1962, it was extended to its current northern terminus at Route 148 and the portion south of US 1 became town roads. Part of old Route 145 called Grove Beach Road between current Route 145 and US 1 is still a state road with unsigned designation State Road 625.

== Junction list ==
The entire route is in Middlesex County.

| Location | mi | km | Destinations | Notes |
|---|---|---|---|---|
| Clinton | 0.00 | 0.00 | US 1 – Westbrook, Madison | Southern terminus |
| Westbrook | 1.37 | 2.20 | Grove Beach Road (SSR 625 south) | Former routing of Route 145 |
| Westbrook | 1.98 | 3.19 | I-95 – New London, New Haven | Exit 70 on I-95 |
| Deep River | 6.64 | 10.69 | Route 80 west – Killingworth | Southern end of Route 80 concurrency |
| Deep River | 6.99 | 11.25 | Route 80 east – Deep River | Northern end of Route 80 concurrency |
| Chester | 9.91 | 15.95 | Route 148 – Hadlyme, Killingworth | Northern terminus |
1.000 mi = 1.609 km; 1.000 km = 0.621 mi: Concurrency terminus
