= William Ward Jr. House =

Historic house in Connecticut, United States

- U.S. National Register of Historic Places
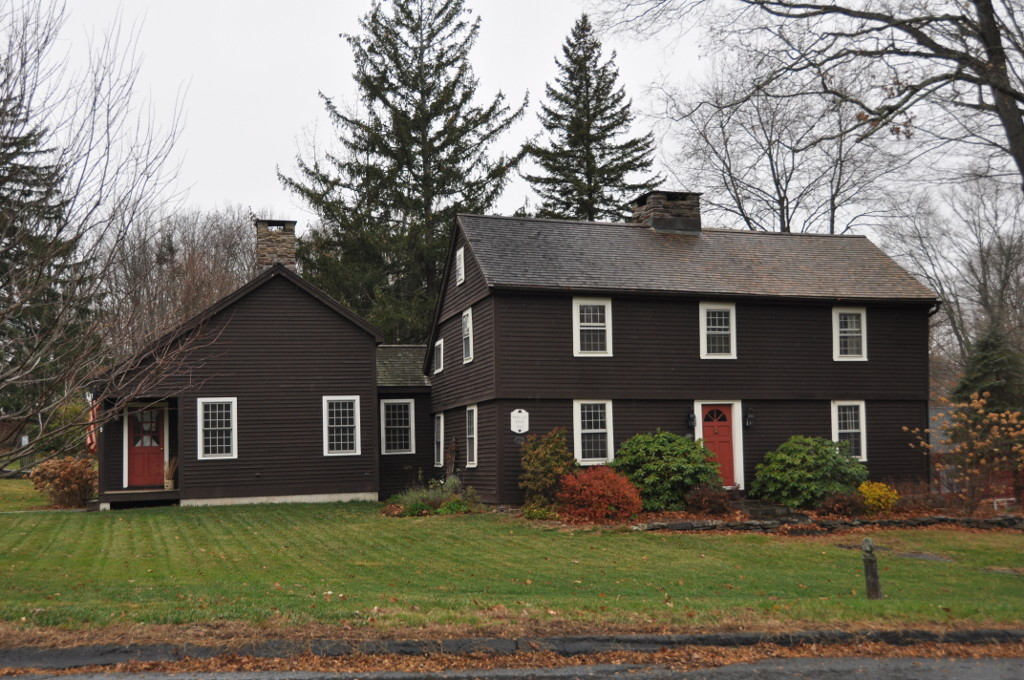

- Location within Connecticut Location within the United States
- Location: 137 Powder Hill Road, Middlefield, Connecticut
- Coordinates: 41°30′14″N 72°43′47″W
- Area: 0.5 acres (0.20 ha)
- Built: 1742
- Architect: Sibley, William
- Architectural style: Colonial, Postmedieval English
- NRHP reference No.: 88000109
- Added to NRHP: February 19, 1988

The William Ward Jr. House is a historic house at 137 Powder Hill Road in Middlefield, Connecticut. Built in 1742, it is the oldest surviving house in Middlefield. It was listed on the National Register of Historic Places in 1988.

== Description and history ==
The William Ward Jr. House stands in a rural residential area of southwestern Middlefield, on the west side of Powder Hill Road south of Long Hill Road near a local park located in a former brownstone quarry featuring dinosaur tracks. It is a 2 1/2-story wood-frame structure, three bays wide, with a large central chimney, gabled roof, and clapboarded exterior. It has a typical New England saltbox appearance with an integral lean-to extending to the rear, and a single-story ell to the left.

The construction of the house includes many early features, including gunstock posts, and its second story overhangs the first slightly, a rare surviving feature in Connecticut. Its foundation and fireplace hearthstones are brownstone, the latter exhibiting fossil remains, suggesting that the stone was probably taken from the nearby quarry site. The interior retains a number of original features, including doors and door hardware.

The property was first granted to William Ward in the 17th century, when the area was part of Middletown. His great-grandson, also named William, built this house in 1742. It is the oldest surviving house in Middlefield, and is architecturally distinctive for the use of cantilevered girts to support the rear lean-to roof. The house remained in the hands of the Wards and associated families until 1935.

== See also ==
- National Register of Historic Places listings in Middlesex County, Connecticut
