= Fernside-Vacation House for Working Girls =

Historic house in Massachusetts, United States

- U.S. National Register of Historic Places
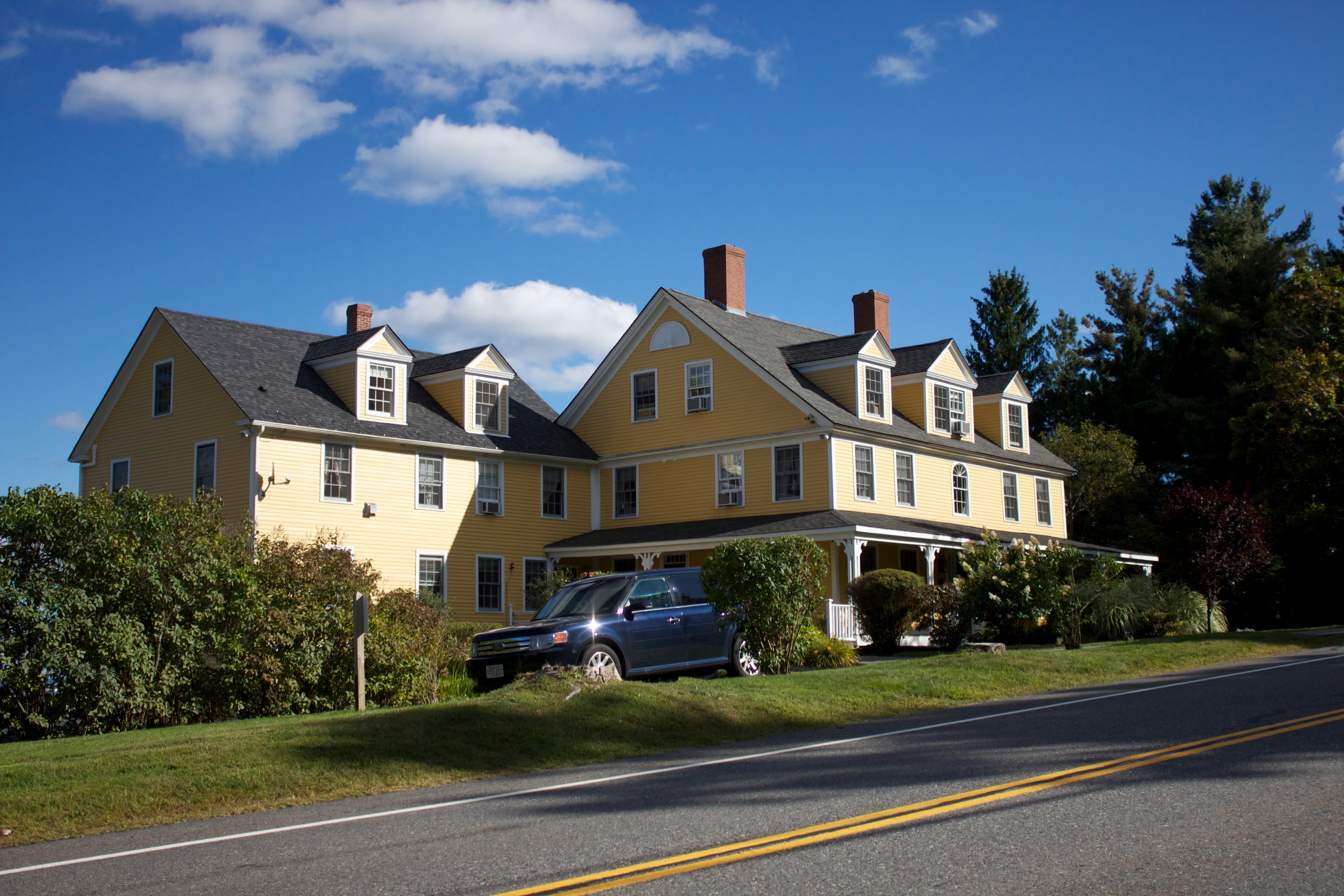

- Location within Massachusetts Location within the United States
- Location: Princeton, Massachusetts
- Coordinates: 42°28′6″N 71°53′4″W
- Area: 6.73 acres (2.72 ha)
- Built: 1835
- Architectural style: Federal
- NRHP reference No.: 02000695
- Added to NRHP: June 27, 2002

Fernside, or the Vacation House for Working Girls, is a historic former resort hotel at 162 Mountain Road in Princeton, Massachusetts. It is a complex of three buildings: its main house, a barn that was converted into a playhouse, and a two-car garage. The core of the main house is a Federal style house built in 1835 by Benjamin Harrington. The house was converted for use as a summer hotel around 1870, and in 1890 it was acquired by the Working Girls' Vacation Society as a place to provide summer recreation for city working women. It is around this time that wings were added to the house, and the barn was converted to a playhouse. The property was used by the Society until it was sold in 1989. The facility is now owned by McLean Hospital, who used it as a drug treatment center.

The complex was listed on the National Register of Historic Places in 2002. It is the best-preserved surviving resort hotel of several that were built in Princeton in the late 19th and early 20th centuries, and may be the oldest resort catering to working women in the nation.

== See also ==
- Working Girls' Vacation Society Historic District, East Haddam, Connecticut, also NRHP-listed
- National Register of Historic Places listings in Worcester County, Massachusetts
