= North Cove Historic District =

Historic district in Connecticut, United States

- U.S. National Register of Historic Places
- U.S. Historic district
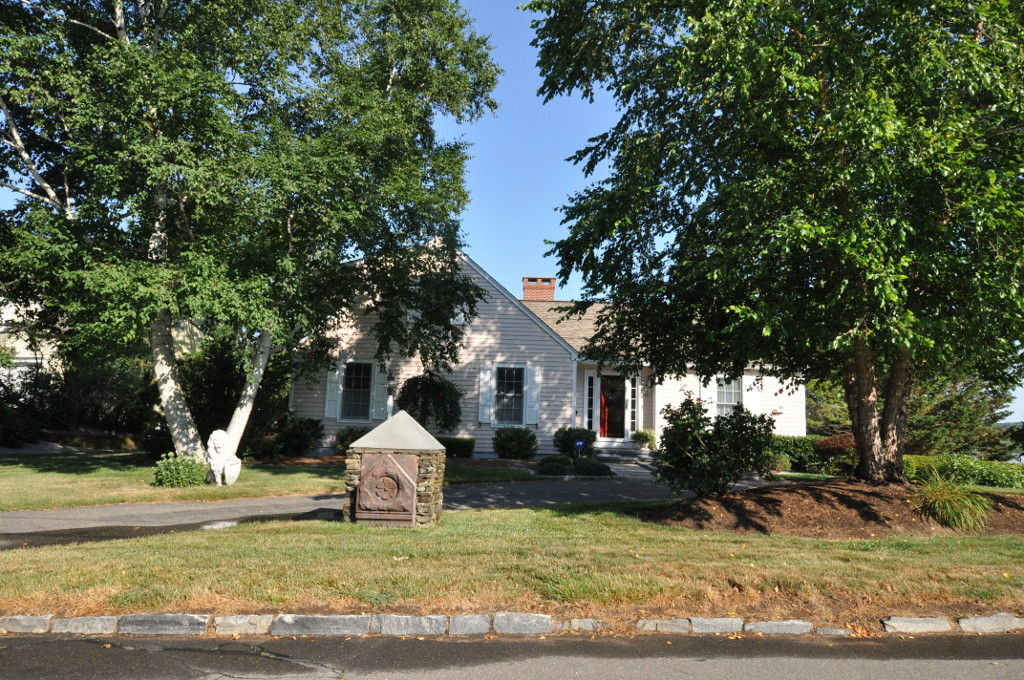

- Location within Connecticut Location within the United States
- Location: Roughly, North Cove Road from Church Street to the Connecticut River and adjacent properties on Cromwell Place, Saybrook, Connecticut
- Coordinates: 41°17′13″N 72°21′32″W
- Area: 37 acres (15 ha)
- Architectural style: Colonial, Federal, and Late 19th and 20th Century Revivals
- NRHP reference No.: 94000766
- Added to NRHP: July 22, 1994

The North Cove Historic District encompasses a historic waterfront community on North Cove Road in Saybrook, Connecticut, United States. Laid out in the 17th century, the area has housing stock mostly built between 1700 and 1855, a period in which it flourished as a port and shipbuilding community. The district was listed on the National Register of Historic Places in 1994.

== Description and history ==
The Saybrook Colony was settled in 1635, by colonists sent by John Winthrop Jr. The colony was located on Saybrook Point, a readily defensible narrow peninsula projecting eastward at the mouth of the Connecticut River. The north side of the peninsula is a cove that was found be an adequate harbor for the young colony, and North Cove Road was laid out from the palisaded fort at the tip of the peninsula to the mainland. Early buildings along North Cove Road have not survived; the oldest surviving building is the Robert Bull House, built about 1700 near the western end of the road. The waterfront area remained commercially viable until 1870, when a railroad was built across the mouth of the cove. After this time, the houses in the area were for the most part adapted as summer residences.

The district is 37 acres (15 ha), extending along North Cove Road east of Church Street. Most of the housing stock in the area was built between 1700 and 1855; there are only a small handful of relatively unsympathetic 20th-century intrusions. The district includes the Black Horse Tavern and the William Tully House, both separately listed on the National Register.

== See also ==
- National Register of Historic Places listings in Middlesex County, Connecticut
