= Westbrook Center, Connecticut =

Census-designated place in Connecticut, United States

- Census-designated place
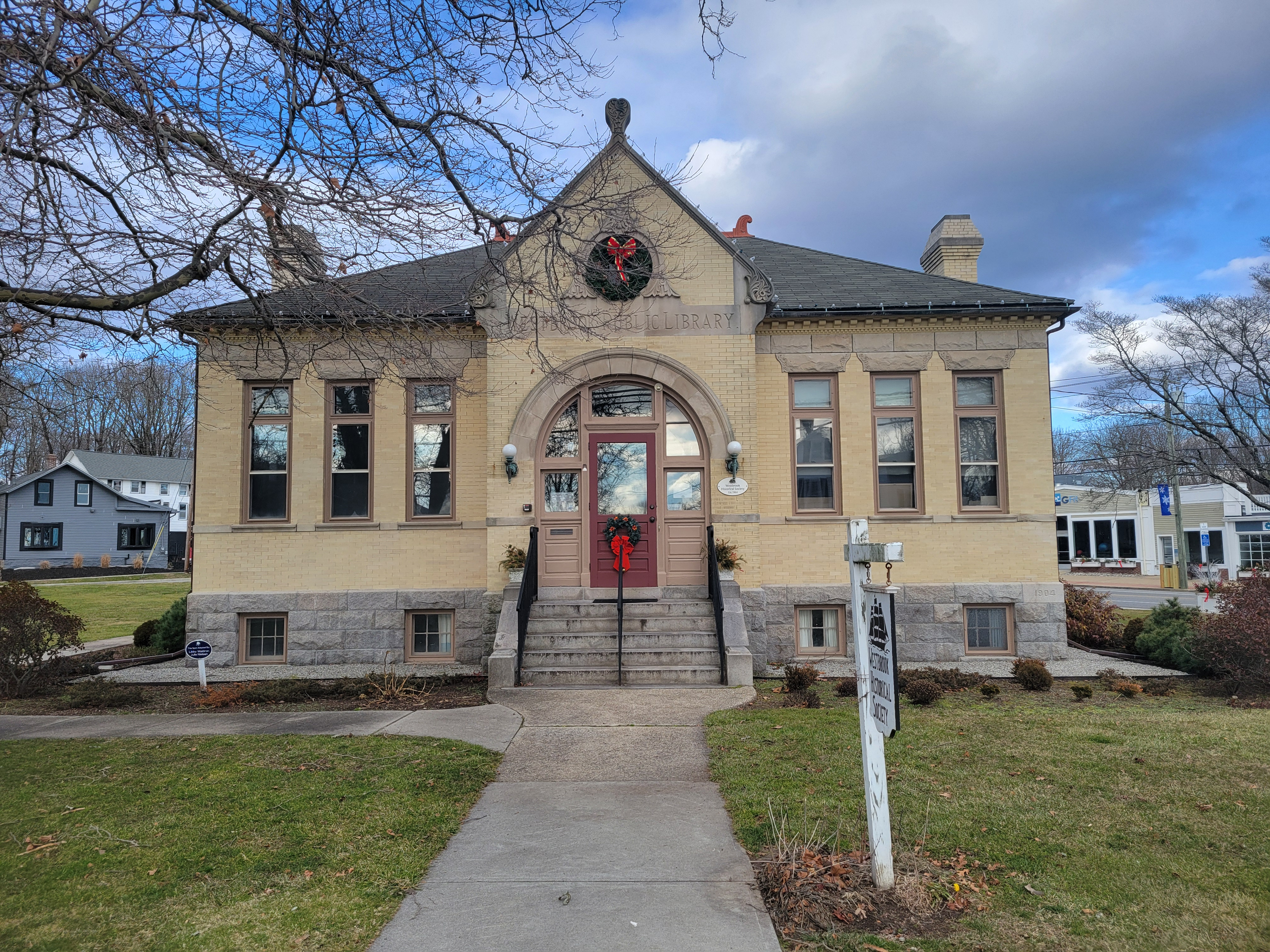
- Westbrook Historical Society

- Location within Connecticut Location within the United States
- Coordinates: 41°17′7″N 72°26′53″W
- Country: United States
- State: Connecticut
- County: Middlesex
- Town: Westbrook

Area
  - Total: 2.10 sq mi (5.43 km^{2})
  - Land: 1.69 sq mi (4.37 km^{2})
  - Water: 0.41 sq mi (1.06 km^{2})
- Elevation: 20 ft (6.1 m)

Population (2010)
  - Total: 2,220
  - Density: 1,315/sq mi (507.9/km^{2})
- Time zone: UTC-5 (Eastern (EST))
  - Summer (DST): UTC-4 (EDT)
- ZIP Code: 06498 (Westbrook)
- Area codes: 860/959
- FIPS code: 09-81750
- GNIS feature ID: 2377878

Westbrook Center is a census-designated place (CDP) comprising the primary village and adjacent residential land in the town of Westbrook, Middlesex County, Connecticut, United States. It is in the southern part of the town, along U.S. Route 1 and bordered to the south by Long Island Sound. To the east it is bordered by the town of Old Saybrook, and the western and northwestern borders of the CDP are the Patchogue River. As of the 2020 census, the CDP had a population of 2,220, out of 6,769 in the entire town of Westbrook.

The Westbrook Town Center Historic District occupies 178 acres (0.72 km^{2}) at the center of the community.

== Demographics ==
=== 2020 census ===
As of the 2020 census, Westbrook Center had a population of 2,220, out of 6,769 in the entire town of Westbrook. The median age was 54.1 years. 11.7% of residents were under the age of 18 and 30.7% of residents were 65 years of age or older. For every 100 females there were 91.0 males, and for every 100 females age 18 and over there were 89.6 males age 18 and over.

100.0% of residents lived in urban areas, while 0.0% lived in rural areas.

There were 1,138 households in Westbrook Center, of which 12.9% had children under the age of 18 living in them. Of all households, 34.3% were married-couple households, 24.3% were households with a male householder and no spouse or partner present, and 35.1% were households with a female householder and no spouse or partner present. About 43.1% of all households were made up of individuals and 20.0% had someone living alone who was 65 years of age or older.

There were 1,866 housing units, of which 39.0% were vacant. The homeowner vacancy rate was 2.8% and the rental vacancy rate was 5.3%.

Racial composition as of the 2020 census
Race	Number	Percent
White	1,867	84.1%
Black or African American	14	0.6%
American Indian and Alaska Native	7	0.3%
Asian	39	1.8%
Native Hawaiian and Other Pacific Islander	0	0.0%
Some other race	134	6.0%
Two or more races	159	7.2%
Hispanic or Latino (of any race)	210	9.5%
