= Oxford Academy (Connecticut) =

Coordinates: 41.282°N 72.443°W

- Westbrook, Connecticut; United States

Information
- Type: Boarding
- Established: 1906
- Head of School: Phil Cocchiola
- Faculty: 23
- Enrollment: 45 total as of 2022-2023 Cap. 48
- Average class size: 1
- Student to teacher ratio: 2:1
- Campus: Oxford Academy
- Color: Blue/white
- Mascot: The Charge
- Website: oxfordacademy.net

The Oxford Academy, located in Westbrook, Connecticut, is an independent college preparatory boarding school.

== History ==
The school was founded in 1906 in Pleasantville, New Jersey, by psychologist Dr. Joseph M. Weidberg. Weidberg was concerned that students were not being well served in traditional educational settings and not thriving due to academic learning differences.

In 1941, school enrollment was limited to a maximum of 15 students but has since grown to 40 students. In 1947 Dr. Edward R. Knight was selected to succeed Dr. Weidberg as Head of School followed by Frank Effinger in 1973, Dr. Jonathan A. Woodhall in 1975, and Philip H. Davis in 1983. In 2010, Philip B. Cocchiola was appointed Head of the School.

In 2024, a pupil of the school attacked another student with an axe.

== Faculty ==
As of 2020, the faculty of Oxford consisted of 23 part-time members and three part time teachers. Most members of the staff live on campus.
