= Westbrook Town Center Historic District =

Historic district in Connecticut, United States

- U.S. National Register of Historic Places
- U.S. Historic district
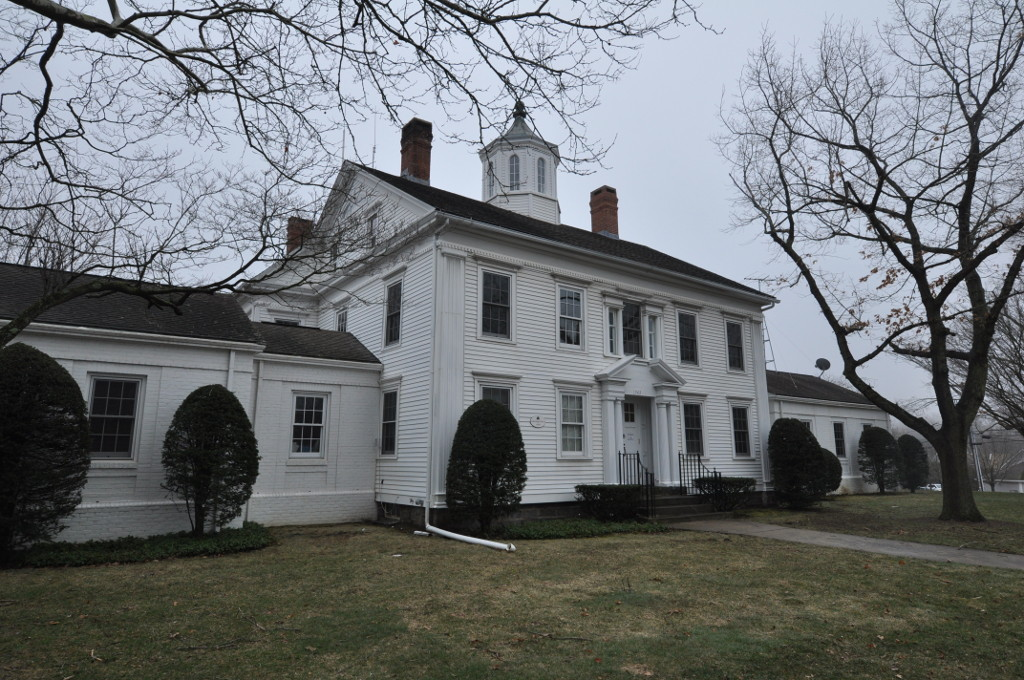
- The 1854 Riggio Municipal Building

- Location within Connecticut Location within the United States
- Location: Old Clinton at Hammock Roads, Boston Post Road at Bellstone Avenue, Trolley Road, Boston Post Road at Goodspeed Drive, Westbrook, Connecticut
- Coordinates: 41°17′04″N 72°26′44″W
- Area: 178 acres (72 ha)
- Architectural style: Greek Revival, Colonial, and Federal
- NRHP reference No.: 100001732
- Added to NRHP: October 16, 2017

The Westbrook Town Center Historic District encompasses the historic town center of Westbrook, Connecticut. Roughly linear in shape, the district extends along the Boston Post Road (U.S. Route 1), with its focal center at the Junction with Essex Road (Connecticut Route 153). The area has been a center of civic activity since the early 18th century, even though Westbrook was not incorporated until 1840, and has residential, commercial, civic, and religious architecture covering three centuries. The district was listed on the National Register of Historic Places in 2017.

== Description and history ==
The area that is now Westbrook was part of the original bounds of Old Saybrook, one of Connecticut's oldest colonial settlements. A west parish was established in 1724 by the petition of area residents, and was known as Pochoug (or Patchogue) or West Saybrook prior to its 1840 incorporation as Westbrook. The town center arose somewhat organically along the Boston Post Road, the principal coast route between New York City and Providence, Rhode Island. A common and cemetery were laid out north of the road at its junction with Essex Road, which led north to the interior. This area is also where the town's early churches were built, and it thus developed as a small commercial center as well.

The district extends along Boston Post Road from Westbrook Town Hall in the west to the Oxford Academy campus in the east. A major lobe extends linearly along Old Clinton Road, which is primarily residential in character, while properties are also include on South Main Street (an old alighnment of the post road). The district includes 195 historically significant buildings spread over 178 acres (72 ha), most of which are residential. These buildings exhibit a broad diversity of styles, having been built between roughly the mid-18th and mid-20th centuries. Prominent buildings include the former library (1904), located in the triangular green at Route 1 and Essex Road, the current town hall (1932 Colonial Revival, originally a school), and a former town hall, originally a private residence built in 1854 and adapted for the town's use in 1940.

== See also ==
- National Register of Historic Places listings in Middlesex County, Connecticut
