= Wickham Road Historic District =

Historic district in Connecticut, United States

- U.S. National Register of Historic Places
- U.S. Historic district
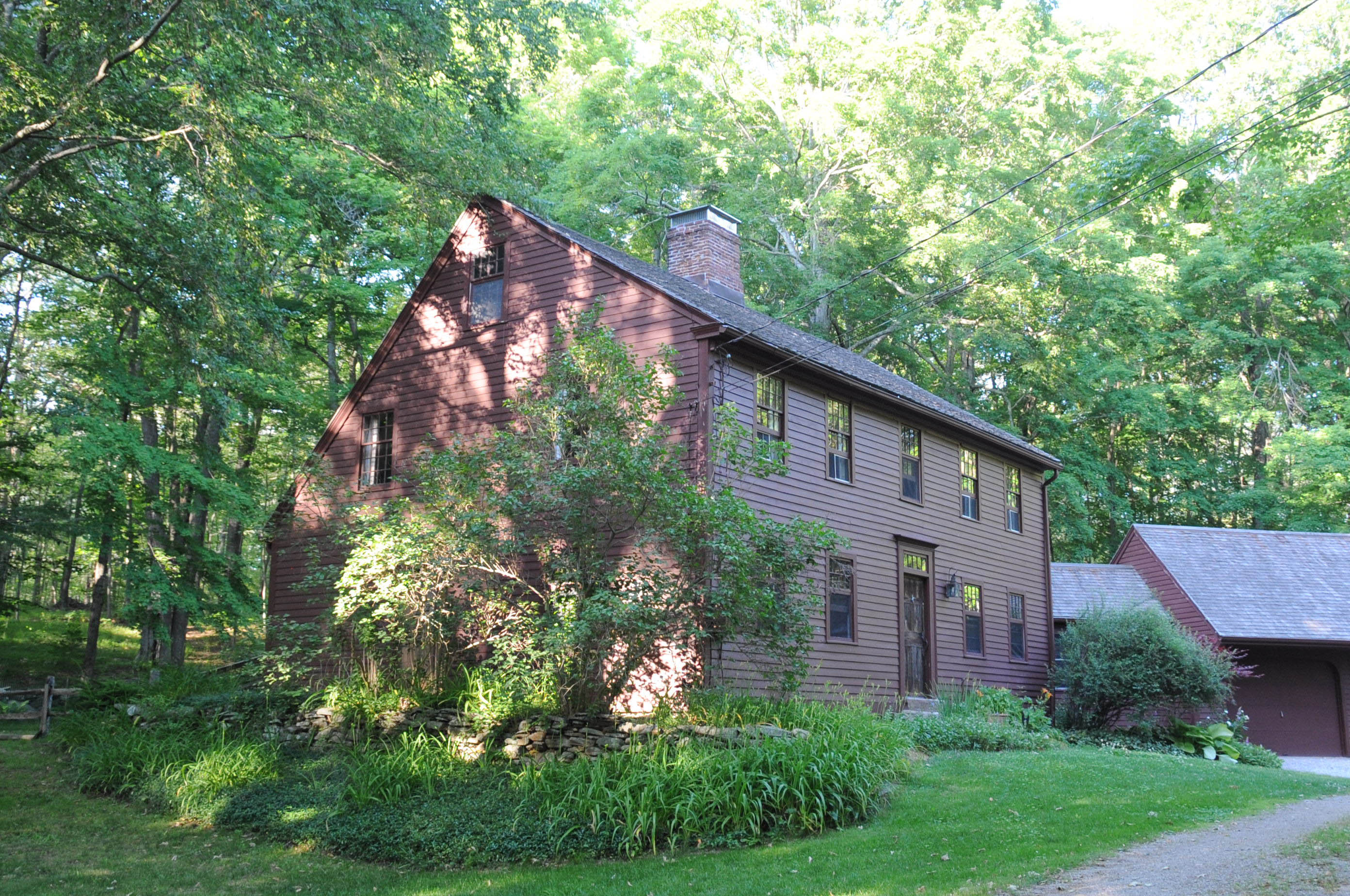

- Location within Connecticut Location within the United States
- Location: Roughly, Junction of Wickham and Geoffrey Roads, East Haddam, Connecticut
- Coordinates: 41°30′16″N 72°22′46″W
- Area: 225 acres (91 ha)
- Built: c.1735, c.1738 and c.1760
- Architectural style: Colonial
- NRHP reference No.: 96000781
- Added to NRHP: July 25, 1996

The Wickham Road Historic District encompasses a well-preserved 18th-century rural streetscape in East Haddam, Connecticut. Included in the district are three houses built c.1735, c.1738, and c.1760, their outbuildings, remnants of another 18th-century house, and remnants of a period sawmill. The area is significant as a visual reminder of what the region might have looked like prior to the advent of industrialization in the 19th century. The district was listed on the National Register of Historic Places in 1996.

== Description and history ==
The district covers 225 acres (91 ha) of rural landscape that is now mostly wooded. Wickham Road is a narrow winding gravel lane lined with stone walls, running roughly parallel to an arm of the headwaters of the Eight Mile River. Widely spaced along the road are three houses, with the foundation of a fourth set at the junction with Geoffrey Road. Each of these properties includes at least portions of agricultural lands historically associated with them. To the northeast of the road is a dam that impounds the Eight Mile River branch, creating Pecks Meadow Pond, with the foundational remnants of the sawmill nearby.

All three of the houses date to the mid-18th century, with estimates of their construction dates ranging from 1736 to 1760. Two are 2-1/2 stories in height, while one is 1-1/2 stories; all are basically vernacular in form and style, and are finished in wooden clapboards with central chimneys. Two of the houses have three-bay facades, architecturally distinctive in a period when five-bay facades were more typical. The house foundation is that of a house erected in 1782 by David Wickham, who also established the sawmill. The sawmill was operated by numerous owners until 1883.

== See also ==
- National Register of Historic Places listings in Middlesex County, Connecticut
