= Falls River (Connecticut River tributary) =

Falls River Pauls River

Location
- Country: United States
- State: Connecticut
- Region: Middlesex County
- Municipality: Essex

Physical characteristics
- Source
  - location: Ivoryton, Connecticut
  - coordinates: 41°21′18″N 72°30′49″W
- Mouth: Connecticut River
  - coordinates: 41°22′04″N 72°23′17″W
- Length: 7.7 mi (12.4 km)

The Falls River is a 7.7-mile-long (12.4 km) river located in Essex, Connecticut. It begins in the Pond Meadow area of Ivoryton and runs for about 5 miles (8.0 km) through Essex. Its beginnings are visible from Comstock Field at the end of Park Road in Ivoryton. Before that it runs to a small pond behind the L.C. Doane Company near Pond Meadow Road. It runs along the old Sohmer Piano Factory, under Walnut Street, and along Main Street. It continues to run along Main Street, being very visible near the Lutheran Church. It eventually winds its way to the Connecticut River, near a parcel of conserved land called Osage Trails.

== See also ==
- List of rivers of Connecticut
