= Samuel Eliot House =

Historic house in Connecticut, United States

- U.S. National Register of Historic Places
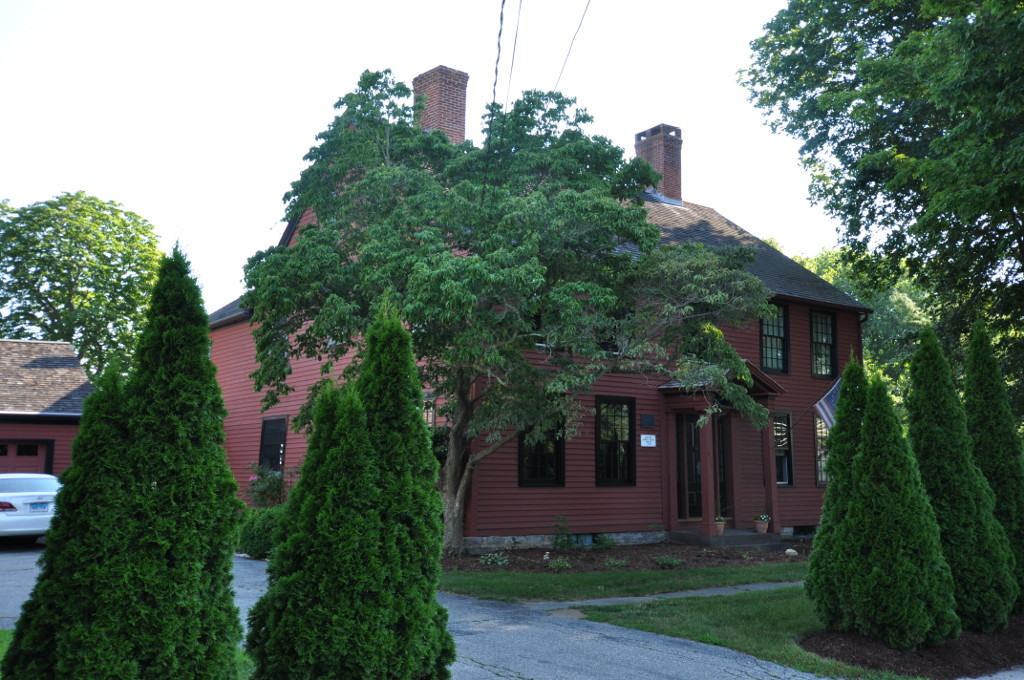

- Location within Connecticut Location within the United States
- Location: 500 Main Street, Old Saybrook, Connecticut
- Coordinates: 41°17′2″N 72°22′8″W
- Area: 4 acres (1.6 ha)
- Built: 1737
- NRHP reference No.: 72001316
- Added to NRHP: November 9, 1972

The Samuel Eliot House is a historic house at 500 Main Street in Old Saybrook, Connecticut. Probably built in 1737, it is a well-preserved example of Georgian residential architecture, and one of Old Saybrook's older buildings. The house was listed on the National Register of Historic Places in 1972.

== Description and history ==
The Samuel Eliot House is located in a residential area south of the town center of Old Saybrook, on the narrow section of the Saybrook Point Peninsula, an east-facing projection into the Connecticut River that was the site of the initial settlement of the Saybrook Colony. It is a 2 1/2-story wood-frame structure, five bays wide, with a side-gable roof and two interior chimneys. Its main entrance is centered on the south facade, with a projecting portico supported by square posts. The interior has retained much of its original woodwork, include wide floorboards on the second floor, fine carved fireplace surrounds on the ground floor, and the carved elements of the main staircase and hall.

The house's construction date is traditionally said to be 1737, when Samuel Eliot (son of Yale founding trustee Jared Eliot) was married. Eliot, a physician, never actually lived in the house, due to ill health and an early death. The house was owned for many years by the Stowe and Newell families (related by marriage), who acquired the house in 1753. Some of its features, notably its interior Federal period features and an unusual fireplace frame credited to the Pennsylvanian Isaac Potts, date to their period of ownership.

== See also ==
- National Register of Historic Places listings in Middlesex County, Connecticut
