= Christeen =

Coordinates: 40.87774°N 73.539702°W

- Christeen (sloop)
- U.S. National Register of Historic Places
- U.S. National Historic Landmark
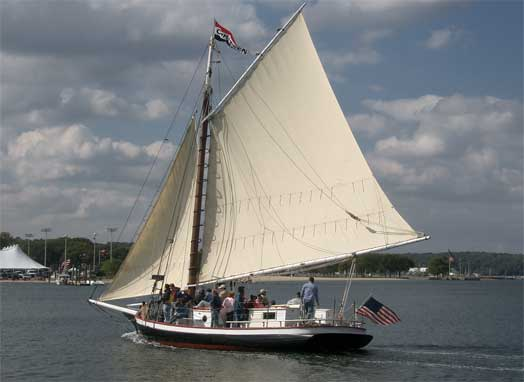
- Location: Oyster Bay, NY
- Built: 1883
- Architectural style: 40 foot gaff-rigged sloop
- NRHP reference No.: 91002060

Significant dates
- Added to NRHP: December 4, 1991
- Designated NHL: December 5, 1992

Christeen is the oldest oyster sloop in the United States and was declared a National Historic Landmark in 1992.

She was built in 1883 in Glenwood Landing, New York as a gaff-rigged sloop. She had several homes including Essex, Connecticut, but in 1992 she arrived back in the hamlet of Oyster Bay, New York. Funds were raised and over the next seven years, she was restored and relaunched in 1999. She currently serves as a working museum ship, offering educational tours, public, and private charters of Oyster Bay at the WaterFront Center.

== History ==
The Christeen, recognized as a National Historic Landmark, was built in 1883 for Captain William Smith to harvest oysters in Oyster Bay and Cold Spring Harbor. Throughout her long life the Christeen worked in the waters of Greenport, Southhold, Connecticut, and New Jersey. The sloop was named for Captain Smiths 13-year-old wife.

In 1914 an engine was installed and the Christeen was used as a cargo vessel transporting potatoes between Long Island and New London, and furniture and other goods between New York City and the eastern end of Long Island.

From 1958 to 1976 she was a pleasure yacht and finally in 1989 was abandoned and nearly sunk in New London, Connecticut. After being saved by Tradewinds Education Network in Connecticut, the Christeen was donated to the Oyster Bay non-profit organization Friends of the Bay and in 1991 she finally returned home. Restoration of the oyster sloop was completed in 1999 at Jakobson Shipyard. The Christeen then joined the WaterFront Center at Oyster Bay, serving their mission of connecting people to the water. After surviving 16 major hurricanes, numerous nor'easters, and severe neglect, the Christeen is now serving as a floating classroom to educate students of all ages about the operation of historic vessels and protection of the marine environment of Oyster Bay and Long Island Sound. The Christeen frequently collaborates with local nonprofits and additionally provides both public and private charters at the WaterFront Center.

== Boat Specifications ==
Christeen Oyster Sloop
Category	Specification
Construction	Wood
Rig	Gaff Sloop
Rig Height	50'
Length at Waterline	35'6"
Length on Deck	40'
Sparred Length	60'
Beam (Width)	15'2"
Draft	3' (Centerboard Up)
Tonnage	11 Gross (10 Net)
Certification	USCG(T) - Passenger Vessel
Sail Area	960 Square Feet
Engine	63 hp (Yanmar Diesel)
