= William Tully House =

Historic house in Connecticut, United States

- U.S. National Register of Historic Places
- U.S. Historic district – Contributing property
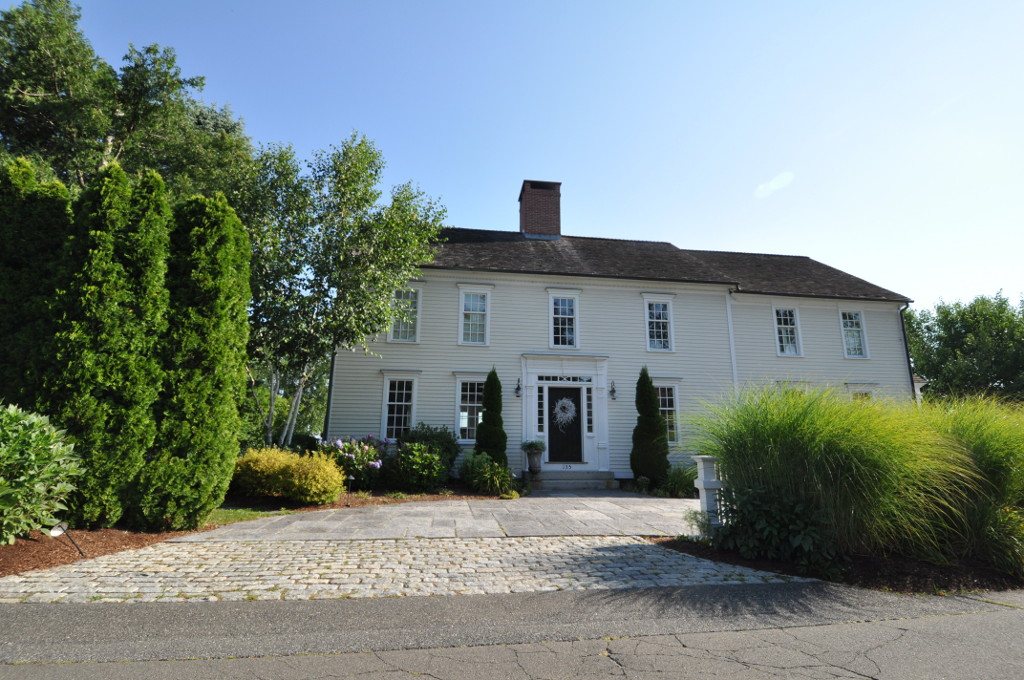

- Location within Connecticut Location within the United States
- Location: 135 North Cove Road, Old Saybrook, Connecticut
- Coordinates: 41°17′21″N 72°21′26″W
- Area: less than 1 acre (0.40 ha)
- Built: c. 1750
- Architect: Tully, William
- Architectural style: Colonial
- Part of: North Cove Historic District (ID94000766)
- NRHP reference No.: 82004340

Significant dates
- Added to NRHP: March 15, 1982
- Designated CP: July 22, 1994

The William Tully House, also known as Hartsease or Heartsease, is a historic house at 135 North Cove Road in Old Saybrook, Connecticut. Built about 1750, it is a well-preserved and architecturally unusual example of period architecture. It also has a well-documented history, having association with one of Connecticut's leading physicians of the early 19th century, and an incident in the American Revolutionary War. It was listed on the National Register of Historic Places in 1982.

== Description and history ==
The William Tully House is located on the north side of North Cove Road, between it and the eponymous North Cove in eastern Old Saybrook. North Cove Road is a historic road dating to the mid-17th century. The house is a 2 1/2-story wood-frame structure, four bays wide, with a central chimney and centered doorway. Architectural evidence suggests it was originally built as a single-room house, with an attic loft and basement kitchen, which was later enlarged. The house's name, Heartsease, is of uncertain origin. There is no documentation why this name came about, but it could be in relation to the flower Viola tricolor (also known as heartsease) once growing in the yard. It could also be related to its use as a summer house for working girls during the 19th century.

The house was built circa 1750. The exact construction date is not documented, but William Tully's father divided his land holdings in 1745. This event, and the 1779 American Revolutionary War incident described below, guided architectural historians to date the house at about 1750, assuming that William Tully built the house soon after receiving the land.

The house was the site of a minor incident on August 8, 1779, in which Tories from Middletown sought release of some of their own goods to sell to the British. The second William Tully defended the property, killing two of the attackers. The house was later owned by Dr. William Tully (the fourth with that name), described as one of Connecticut's leading scientific doctors of the first half of the 19th century and a teacher at the Yale Medical School.

== See also ==
- National Register of Historic Places listings in Middlesex County, Connecticut
