= Williams and Stancliff Octagon Houses =

Historic houses in Connecticut, United States

- U.S. National Register of Historic Places
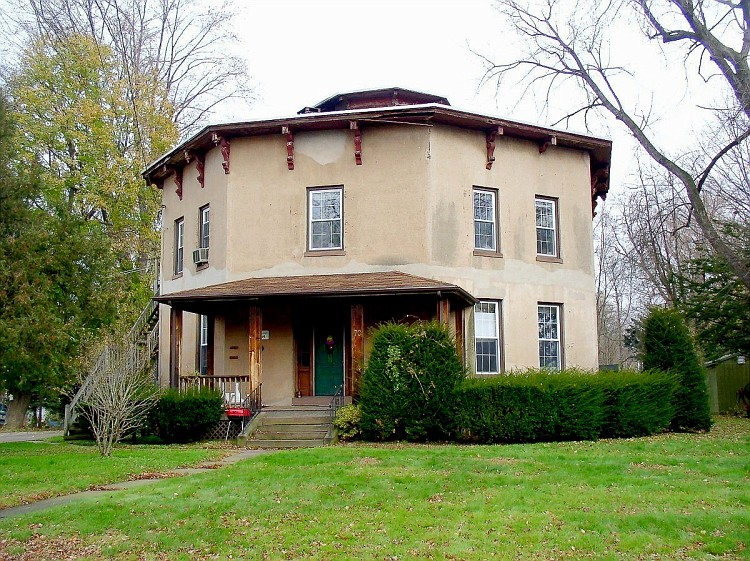
- The northern of the two houses

- Location within Connecticut Location within the United States
- Location: 26 and 28 Marlborough Street, Portland, Connecticut
- Coordinates: 41°34′21″N 72°38′20″W
- Area: 2 acres (0.81 ha)
- Built: c. 1853–1855
- Architectural style: Octagon Mode and Italianate
- NRHP reference No.: 76001985
- Added to NRHP: April 22, 1976

The Joseph Williams Octagon House and the Gilbert Stancliff Octagon House are once-identical historic mid-1850s octagon houses located next to each other at 26 and 28 Marlborough Street in Portland, Connecticut. Constructed of Portland brownstone in the 1850s, they are distinctive as the only known pair of little-altered octagon houses in the state. The pair of houses, also known as the Octagon House Pair, was added to the National Register of Historic Places in 1976.

== Description and history ==
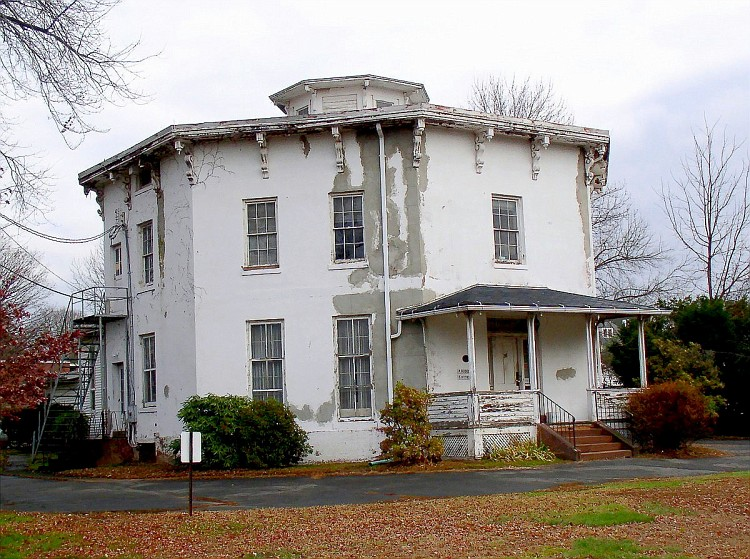
The southern house

The two octagon houses are located just outside the town center of Portland, on the north side of Marlborough Street. They are set well back from the street, with a wide grassy expanse in between. Both buildings are two stories in height, with brownstone walls that have been finished in painted stucco. Each has an octagonal cupola at the center of the roof, and a single-story porch on the front facade, sheltering the main entrance. The Stancliff house's porch is a 20th-century replacement. The main roof eave on each house is adorned with carved wooden brackets. When evaluated for National Register listing in the 1970s, the building interiors appeared to be relatively little-altered, despite conversion of one of the buildings to apartments.

The two houses were built for Gilbert Stancliff and his brother-in-law, Joseph Williams, and his wife Laura. The stone for their construction came from the local brownstone quarry owned by Stancliff. They may have been built by Stancliff's brother Charles, who was a local builder.

== See also ==
- List of octagon houses
- National Register of Historic Places listings in Middlesex County, Connecticut
