= Westbrook, Connecticut =

- Town
- Town of Westbrook
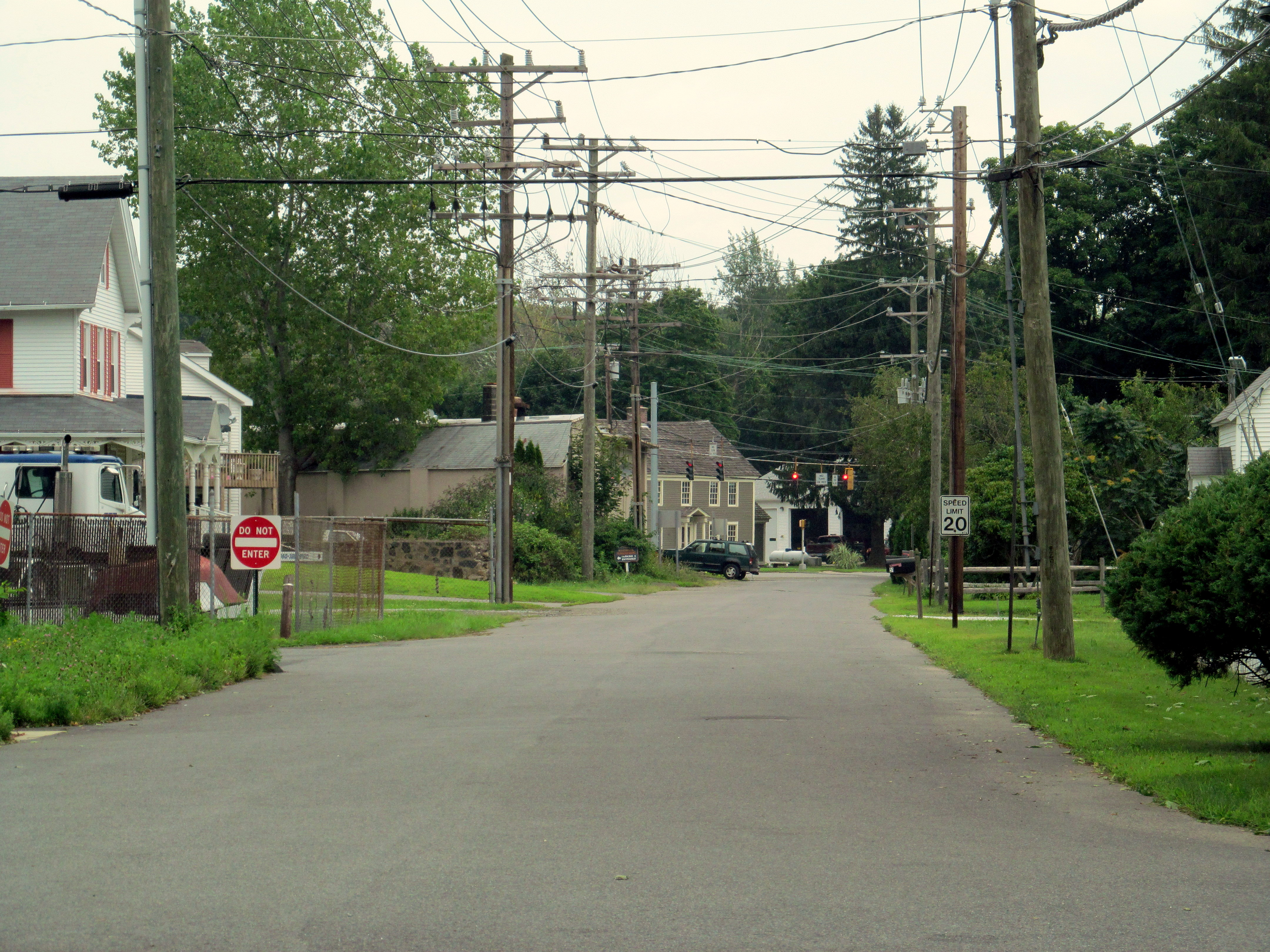
- Looking east on Trolley Road

- Seal

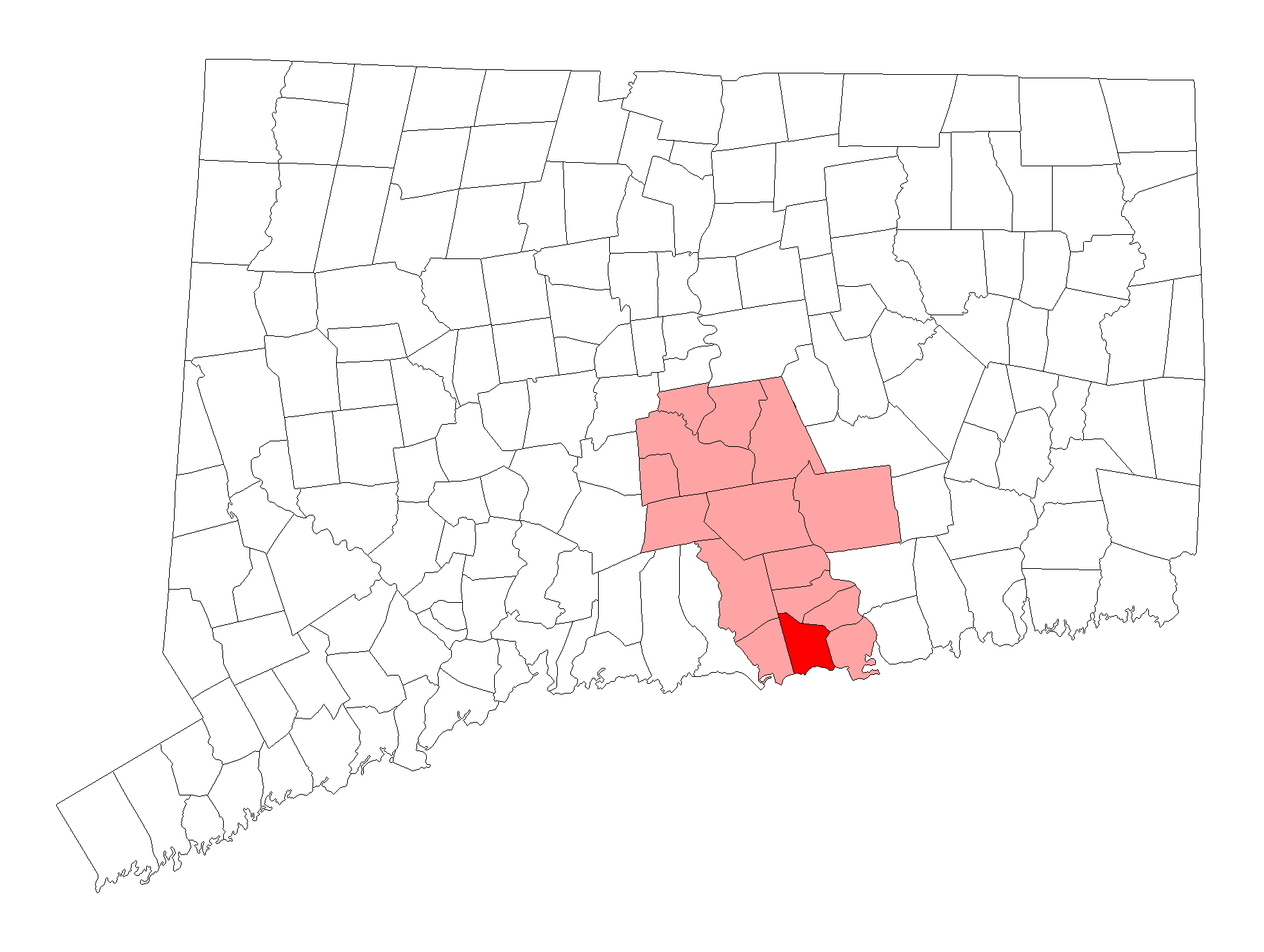
- Coordinates: 41°18′N 72°28′W
- Country: United States
- U.S. state: Connecticut
- County: Middlesex
- Region: Lower CT River Valley
- Incorporated: 1840

Government
  - Type: Selectman-town meeting
  - First selectman: John Hall, III (R)
  - Selectman: Joseph Campbell (R)
  - Selectman: Chester Bialicki (D)

Area
  - Total: 21.4 sq mi (55.4 km^{2})
  - Land: 15.7 sq mi (40.7 km^{2})
  - Water: 5.7 sq mi (14.7 km^{2})
- Elevation: 52 ft (16 m)

Population (2020)
  - Total: 6,769
  - Density: 431/sq mi (166.3/km^{2})
- Time zone: UTC−5 (Eastern)
  - Summer (DST): UTC−4 (Eastern)
- ZIP code: 06498
- Area codes: 860/959
- FIPS code: 09-81680
- GNIS feature ID: 0213528
- Website: http://www.westbrookct.us/

Westbrook is a town in Middlesex County, Connecticut, United States. The town is part of the Lower Connecticut River Valley Planning Region. The population was 6,769 at the 2020 census. The town center is classified by the U.S. Census Bureau as a census-designated place (CDP).

== Geography ==
Westbrook lies in the shoreline area of the state. The town is bordered by the towns of Essex, Clinton, Deep River, and Old Saybrook, where the Connecticut River empties into Long Island Sound. The Salt Meadow Unit of the Stewart B. McKinney National Wildlife Refuge is located in town.

According to the United States Census Bureau, the town has a total area of 21.4 square miles (55 km^{2}), of which 15.7 square miles (41 km^{2}) is land and 5.7 square miles (15 km^{2}) (26.47%) is water. The Westbrook Center CDP has a total area of 2.2 square miles (5.7 km^{2}) of which 22.33% is water.

Westbrook encompasses three islands in Long Island Sound, all of which are uninhabited. Salt Island is the easternmost and smallest, at approximately 0.9 acres. Menunketesuck Island, which is the largest of Westbrook's islands at approximately 4.6 acres, extends into the sound from the outlet of the Menunketesuck and Patchogue Rivers and is part of the Stewart B. McKinney National Wildlife Refuge. Further west is Duck Island, measuring approximately 3.6 acres.

Private beach associations in the town are Chapman Beach, Coral Sands, Grove Beach Point, Grove Beach Terrace, Horse Hill, Island View, Kelsey Point, Little Stannard, Middle Beach, Pilot's Point, Pointina, Quotonset Beach, Sagamore Terrace, Salt Works, Stannard Beach, and West Beach.

== History ==
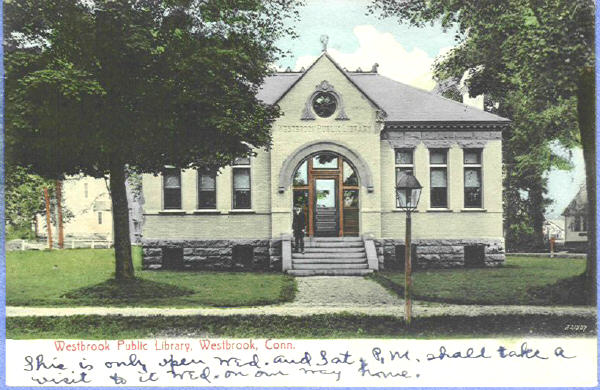
Town library, c. 1906

Westbrook was incorporated in 1840. Before being incorporated, Westbrook was known as Pochoug and then West Saybrook and was a district within the Town of Old Saybrook.

== Demographics ==
Historical population
Census	Pop.	Note	%±
1840	1,182		—
1850	1,202		1.7%
1860	1,056		−12.1%
1870	987		−6.5%
1880	878		−11.0%
1890	874		−0.5%
1900	884		1.1%
1910	951		7.6%
1920	849		−10.7%
1930	1,037		22.1%
1940	1,159		11.8%
1950	1,549		33.6%
1960	2,399		54.9%
1970	3,820		59.2%
1980	5,216		36.5%
1990	5,414		3.8%
2000	6,292		16.2%
2010	6,938		10.3%
2020	6,769		−2.4%
U.S. Decennial Census

At the 2000 census there were 6,292 people, 2,605 households, and 1,693 families living in the town. The population density was 400.3 inhabitants per square mile (154.6/km^{2}). There were 3,460 housing units at an average density of 220.1 per square mile (85.0/km^{2}). The racial makeup of the town was 95.76% White, 0.70% African American, 0.13% Native American, 1.56% Asian, 0.11% Pacific Islander, 0.72% from other races, and 1.03% from two or more races. Hispanic or Latino people of any race were 2.51%.

Of the 2,605 households 26.5% had children under the age of 18 living with them, 54.1% were married couples living together, 7.8% had a female householder with no husband present, and 35.0% were non-families. 28.0% of households were one person and 12.7% were one person aged 65 or older. The average household size was 2.39 and the average family size was 2.93.

The age distribution was 21.8% under the age of 18, 5.2% from 18 to 24, 29.2% from 25 to 44, 26.7% from 45 to 64, and 17.1% 65 or older. The median age was 42 years. For every 100 females, there were 95.8 males. For every 100 females age 18 and over, there were 92.7 males.

The median household income was $57,531 and the median family income was $71,344. Males had a median income of $46,889 versus $32,227 for females. The per capita income for the town was $28,680. About 2.7% of families and 5.2% of the population were below the poverty line, including 3.7% of those under age 18 and 8.1% of those age 65 or over.

=== CDP ===
At the 2000 census, there were 2,238 people, 1,052 households, and 551 families living in the Westbrook Center CDP. The population density was 1,336.0 inhabitants per square mile (515.8/km^{2}). There were 1,662 housing units at an average density of 992.2 per square mile (383.1/km^{2}). The racial makeup of the CDP was 94.50% White, 1.39% African American, 0.09% Native American, 2.19% Asian, 0.63% from other races, and 1.21% from two or more races. Hispanic or Latino people of any race were 2.19% of the population.

Of the 1,052 households 18.5% had children under the age of 18 living with them, 40.9% were married couples living together, 8.7% had a female householder with no husband present, and 47.6% were non-families. 37.9% of households were one person and 16.8% were one person aged 65 or older. The average household size was 2.09 and the average family size was 2.71.

The age distribution was 16.1% under the age of 18, 6.9% from 18 to 24, 28.9% from 25 to 44, 25.7% from 45 to 64, and 22.4% 65 or older. The median age was 44 years. For every 100 females, there were 92.6 males. For every 100 females age 18 and over, there were 90.1 males.

The median household income was $45,385 and the median family income was $59,375. Males had a median income of $40,707 versus $31,250 for females. The per capita income for the CDP was $29,866. About 3.7% of families and 6.6% of the population were below the poverty line, including 6.7% of those under age 18 and 7.2% of those age 65 or over.

== Government ==
Voter registration and party enrollment as of October 17, 2025
Party	Total voters	Percentage
Unaffiliated	2,406	43.9%
Republican	1,533	28%
Democratic	1,448	26.4%
Minor parties	95	1.7%
Total	5,482	100%

Presidential election results
Year	Democratic	Republican	Third parties
2024	51.4% 2,178	47.4% 2,006	1.2% 49
2020	53.0% 2,288	45.4% 1,958	1.5% 65
2016	44.8% 1,699	51.0% 1,936	4.0% 155
2012	53.6% 1,903	45.2% 1,605	1.3% 45
2008	54.9% 2,104	43.8% 1,680	1.3% 51
2004	51.0% 1,908	47.7% 1,787	1.3% 49
2000	51.8% 1,720	42.0% 1,397	6.1% 203

== Education ==
The town's public education needs are overseen by its local school district. Westbrook's public elementary school, the Daisy Ingraham Elementary School, was the recipient of a Blue Ribbon honor for excellence for 1998–1999. A new middle school, connected to the high school, Westbrook High School, opened in 2005.

Oxford Academy, an all-boys boarding school, has been located in Westbrook since 1973.

== Infrastructure ==
=== Emergency services ===
The town of Westbrook is the home of Connecticut State Police Troop F, located on Interstate 95 and Spencer Plains Road. Police services in Westbrook are coordinated by a resident state trooper and several police constables. Constables patrol during the day and evening hours while overnight patrol is provided by the state police.

Fire protection is provided by the Westbrook Fire Department (a.k.a. Westbrook Chemical Engine Company), located on South Main Street. This all-volunteer department is responsible for response to alarms of fire, rescue emergencies and medical emergencies. Emergency medical services are provided by the Westbrook Ambulance Association, a paid-on-call basic life support service. Paramedic services are provided by Middlesex Hospital from their satellite facility in Essex, Connecticut.

=== Transportation ===
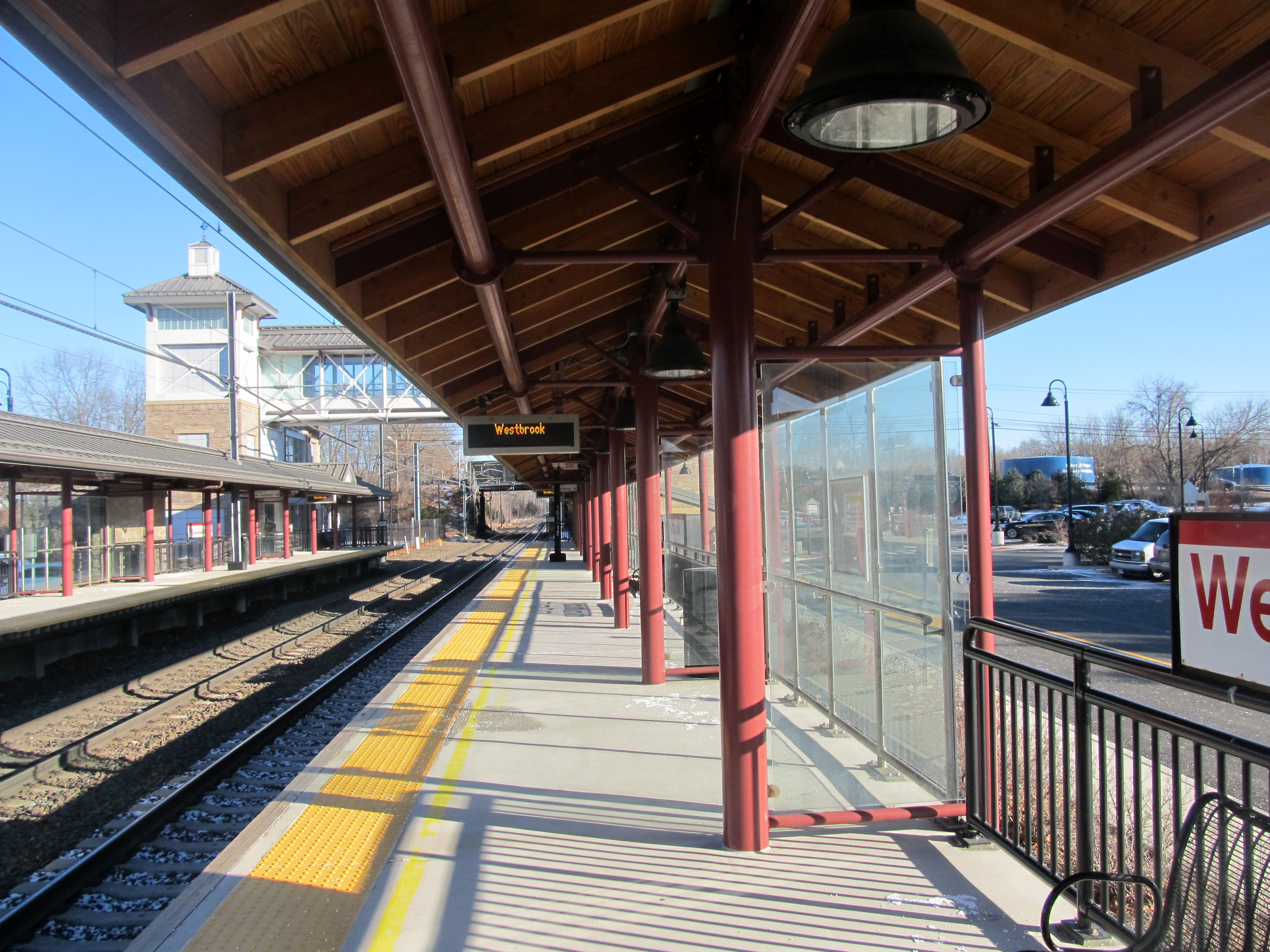
Eastbound platform at Westbrook station

Westbrook station is a station along the Shore Line East commuter line.

The Estuary Transit District provides public bus transportation throughout Westbrook and the surrounding towns through its 9 Town Transit Service. Services include connections to the Old Saybrook Train Station, which is served by Amtrak in addition to the Shore Line East railroad.

== Notable people ==
- Everett Bacon (1890–1989), athlete and World War I veteran; born in town
- David Bushnell (1740–1824), inventor who built the first submarine ever used in combat
- Art Carney (1918–2003), actor and comedian
- George Lessey (1879–1947), silent movie actor; lived his later years and died in Westbrook
