= Connecticut Route 9 =

State highway in Connecticut, US

Route 9

Route information
- Maintained by CTDOT
- Length: 40.89 mi (65.81 km)
- Existed: 1932 (truncated in 1969)–present

Major junctions
- South end: I-95 / US 1 in Old Saybrook
- Route 17 / Route 66 in Middletown; Route 99 in Cromwell; I-91 in Cromwell; US 5 / Route 15 / Berlin Turnpike / Route 372 in Berlin; Route 71 / Route 72 / Route 174 in New Britain
- North end: I-84 / US 6 in Farmington

Location
- Country: United States
- State: Connecticut
- Counties: Middlesex, Hartford

Highway system
- Connecticut State Highway System; Interstate; US; State; SSR; SR; Scenic
← Route 8	→ Route 9A
← Route 9	N.E.	→ Route 11

Connecticut State Route 9 is a 40.89-mile-long (65.81 km) expressway running from Interstate 95 (I-95) in Old Saybrook north to I-84 in Farmington. It connects the Eastern Coastline of the state along with the Lower Connecticut River Valley to Hartford and the Capital Region.

== Route description ==
Route 9 is a four-lane freeway for most of its length. It begins at I-95/US 1, on the west bank of the Connecticut River. It runs northwesterly, parallel to the river for approximately 25 miles (40 km) between Old Saybrook and Route 99 in Cromwell. Along the river, it passes through the towns of Essex, Deep River, Chester, Haddam, and Middletown. After its junction with Interstate 91 in Cromwell, Route 9 continues westward then northward, running through the Hartford area towns/cities of Berlin, New Britain, Newington, and Farmington. Route 9 terminates at the junction with I-84/US 6 in Farmington.

Route 9 becomes an at-grade expressway in the downtown area of Middletown, where it overlaps with Route 17, before reverting to a freeway. The at-grade portion is 0.35 miles (0.56 km) in length and consists of two intersections with traffic lights (signed as exits 23C and 24). One of these intersections is where Route 17 leaves Route 9 to join Route 66. ConnDOT is currently considering modifications to this section of Route 9 which would remove the traffic lights to reduce collisions and improve traffic flow.

The section from I-95 in Old Saybrook to I-91 in Cromwell is known as the Chester Bowles Highway. The section from I-91 in Cromwell to Berlin is known as the Korean War Veterans Memorial Highway. The section from Route 72 in New Britain to Route 175 in Newington is known as the Taras Shevchenko Expressway. The section from Route 175 in Newington to the junction with I-84 is known as the Iwo Jima Memorial Expressway.

== History ==
The road connecting Deep River (then known as Saybrook) and Wethersfield along the west bank of the Connecticut River was a toll road known as the Middlesex Turnpike, which operated from 1802 to 1876. Another toll road running from Hartford to the northwest corner of Granby was known as the Granby Turnpike and operated from 1800 to 1854.

The state took over maintenance of trunk highways at the beginning of the 20th century. In 1922, New England began publicly numbering its state roads. The road running from Old Saybrook to the Massachusetts state line in Granby was designated as part of Route 10, a multi-state route continuing all the way to northern New Hampshire. The portion of New England Route 10 in Connecticut used the alignments of the Middlesex and Granby Turnpikes. In the 1932 state highway renumbering, Route 10 was relocated to a different alignment beginning in New Haven instead. The Old Saybrook to Granby road was designated as Route 9.

In the mid-1950s and early 1960s, various plans for a freeway along the Route 9 alignment were developed. Construction also began on the Old Saybrook to Cromwell segment around this time. The freeway from I-95 to I-91 was completely open by 1969. Old Route 9 south of Middletown was re-designated as Route 9A (later to be designated as Route 154).

Several options were considered and then later abandoned for the freeway portion through Hartford and points north. By the mid-1960s, a Route 9 freeway alignment through Hartford was finally abandoned. Route 9 was truncated to end at I-91 in Cromwell instead. The portion of old Route 9 from Hartford to Granby was assigned as an extension of Route 189, while the Cromwell to Hartford segment that was not upgraded to freeway was re-designated as Route 99.

In 1979, the eastern end of the Route 72 freeway up to the Berlin Turnpike was completed, including a connector to the planned alignment of Interstate 291 in New Britain. By this time, however, this portion of Interstate 291 had been deleted from the state's Interstate network. By 1989, a freeway connection was completed between the north end of Route 9 at I-91 and the east end of Route 72 at the Berlin Turnpike. Route 72 was truncated to end at the I-291 connector while Route 9 was extended along the deleted portion of the Route 72 freeway. Route 9 also took over the I-291 connector, which was extended in 1986 to Route 175.

In 1992 Route 9 was finally connected to I-84 in Farmington using a portion of the cancelled I-291 right of way, completing Route 9 as it exists today. The segment between I-84 in Farmington and I-91 in Cromwell serves the areas through which the southwest leg of I-291 was to be built; I-291 would have provided a parallel route to the north connecting roughly between Exit 29 (Route 175) on Route 9, to a new exit north of Exit 22 on I-91.

== Exit list ==
Exit numbers were converted from sequential to mile-based in January 2023.

County	Location	mi	km	Old exit	New exit	Destinations	Notes
Middlesex	Old Saybrook	0.00	0.00	—	1A	I-95 north / US 1 north – New London	Southern terminus
Middlesex	Old Saybrook	0.40– 0.61	0.64– 0.98	1	1	Ferry Point	Northbound exit and southbound entrance; access via Essex Road
Middlesex	Old Saybrook	0.40– 0.61	0.64– 0.98	—	1B	I-95 south / US 1 south – New Haven	Southbound exit and northbound entrance; exit 78 on I-95
Middlesex	Old Saybrook	1.54	2.48	2	2	Route 154 – Old Saybrook	
Middlesex	Essex	3.91	6.29	3	3	Route 154 / Route 153 – Essex	Northern terminus of Route 153; also serves Essex Steam Train & Riverboat, Centerbrook, Ivoryton, & Westbrook
Middlesex	Essex	5.21	8.38	4	5	Route 154 (Middlesex Turnpike)	Also serves Centerbrook & Ivoryton
Middlesex	Deep River	7.01	11.28	5	7	Route 80 – Deep River	
Middlesex	Chester	8.93	14.37	6	8	Route 148 – Chester	
Middlesex	Chester	10.69	17.20	7	10	Route 82 – Haddam, East Haddam	Western terminus and exit 1 on Route 82; also serves Goodspeed Opera House, Goodspeed Airport, Gillette Castle, & Moodus
Middlesex	Haddam	13.93	22.42	8	13	Beaver Meadow Road	
Middlesex	Haddam	15.74	25.33	9	15	Route 81 – Killingworth, Clinton	Clinton not signed northbound
Middlesex	Higganum	19.43	31.27	10	19	Route 154 south / Aircraft Road	Northern terminus of Route 154
Middlesex	Middletown	21.31	34.30	11	21	Route 155 to Route 17 – Durham	Eastern terminus of Route 155;
Middlesex	Middletown	22.41	36.07	12	22	Bow Lane – Harbor Area	Northbound exit only
Middlesex	Middletown	22.86	36.79	12	22	Silver Street	Southbound exit and northbound entrance
Middlesex	Middletown	23.34	37.56	13	23A	Route 17 south / South Main Street	Southern end of Route 17 concurrency; exit 21B on Route 17; no northbound exit
Middlesex	Middletown	23.70	38.14	14	23B	deKoven Drive – Harbor Area	Southbound exit and northbound entrance
Middlesex	Middletown	23.94	38.53	Northern end of freeway section			
Middlesex	Middletown	23.94	38.53	15	23C	Route 66 west – Middletown	At-grade intersection; access via SR 545; signed as exit 23 northbound
Middlesex	Middletown	24.29	39.09	16	24	Route 66 east / Route 17 north – Portland	At-grade intersection; northern end of Route 17 concurrency
Middlesex	Middletown	24.29	39.09	Southern end of freeway section			
Middlesex	Cromwell	25.30	40.72	18	25	Route 99 – Cromwell, Rocky Hill	Northbound exit and southbound entrance; southern terminus of Route 99; former routing of Route 9
Middlesex	Cromwell	27.61	44.43	19	27	Route 372 (West Street) – Cromwell	Cromwell not signed northbound
Middlesex	Cromwell	29.28– 29.58	47.12– 47.60	20	29-30	I-91 – Hartford, New Haven	Signed as exits 29 (I-91 north) and 30 (I-91 south); exits 27A and 27B on I-91
Hartford	Berlin	31.68	50.98	21	31	Route 372 to US 5 north / Route 15 north (Berlin Turnpike) – East Berlin, Hartford	Northbound exit and southbound entrance
Hartford	Berlin	32.16	51.76	21	31	US 5 / Route 15 (Berlin Turnpike) – Hartford, New Haven	Southbound exit and entrance
Hartford	Berlin	32.29– 32.37	51.97– 52.09	22	32	US 5 south / Route 15 south (Berlin Turnpike) / Route 372 (Mill Street) – New Haven, East Berlin	Signed for US 5/Route 15 northbound, Route 372 southbound; no southbound entrance
Hartford	Berlin	33.05	53.19	23	33	Christian Lane – Berlin	Southbound exit and northbound entrance
Hartford	Berlin	34.07	54.83	24	34	To Route 71 / Route 372 – Kensington	Northbound exit and southbound entrance; access via SR 571
Hartford	New Britain	35.13	56.54	25	35	Ellis Street to Route 71 – Kensington	Signed for Route 71/Kensington southbound, Ellis Street northbound
Hartford	New Britain	35.39	56.95	26 27	36	Downtown New Britain	Northbound exit only; access via Columbus Boulevard
Hartford	New Britain	35.74	57.52	26 27	36	Chestnut Street	Southbound exit and northbound entrance
Hartford	New Britain	35.84– 36.40	57.68– 58.58	28	37A	Route 72 west to I-84 – Bristol	Signed as exit 37 northbound; I-84 not signed northbound; eastern terminus and exits 1A and 1B on Route 72 east
Hartford	New Britain	35.84– 36.40	57.68– 58.58	28A	37B	Downtown New Britain	Southbound exit and northbound entrance; access via Route 71 and Route 174 east
Hartford	Newington	37.95	61.07	29	38	Route 175 – Newington	Northbound exit and southbound entrance
Hartford	Newington	38.33	61.69	29	38	To Route 175 – Newington	Southbound exit and northbound entrance; access via SR 505
Hartford	New Britain	39.48	63.54	30	39	Route 71 – Corbins Corner	Also serves New Britain and West Hartford
Hartford	Farmington	40.89	65.81	31-32	40A-B	I-84 (US 6) – Waterbury, Hartford	Northern terminus; signed as exits 40A (I-84 west) and 40B (I-84 east); exit 55 on I-84
1.000 mi = 1.609 km; 1.000 km = 0.621 mi: Concurrency terminus; Incomplete access
