= Connecticut Route 148 =

State highway in southern Connecticut, US

Route 148
- Map of southern Connecticut with Route 148 highlighted in red

Route information
- Maintained by CTDOT
- Length: 16.35 mi (26.31 km)
- Existed: 1932–present

Major junctions
- West end: Route 79 in Killingworth
- Route 9 in Chester
- East end: Route 82 in Lyme

Location
- Country: United States
- State: Connecticut
- Counties: Middlesex, New London

Highway system
- Connecticut State Highway System; Interstate; US; State; SSR; SR; Scenic
← Route 147	→ Route 149

Route 148 is a state highway in southern and southeastern Connecticut running from Route 79 in Killingworth (near the Durham line) to Route 82 in the village of Hadlyme (in the town of Lyme). Route 148 crosses the Connecticut River using the Chester–Hadlyme Ferry.

== Route description ==
Route 148 begins as Killingworth-Durham Road at an intersection with Route 79 in northwestern Killingworth and heads southeast for 6.1 miles (9.8 km). It then turns east along Tooley Road then Chester Road as it heads towards the town of Chester. North of Killingworth center, it intersects with Route 81, about 1.9 miles (3.1 km) west of the Chester line. Upon entering Chester, the road becomes West Main Street, continuing eastward toward the town center. Along the way it has a junction with Route 145 (signed for the village of Winthrop) and with Route 9 (at Exit 6) before turning east northeast. In Chester Center, the road becomes Water Street, which continues to an intersection with Route 154 (for Deep River and Haddam). After crossing Route 154, the road becomes Ferry Road as it runs for another 0.7 miles (1.1 km) to the Chester-Hadlyme Ferry landing on the west bank of the Connecticut River. After crossing the river into the town of Lyme, Route 148 (still known as Ferry Road) continues east through the village of Hadlyme for another 1.6 miles (2.6 km) until it ends at an intersection with Route 82.

== History ==
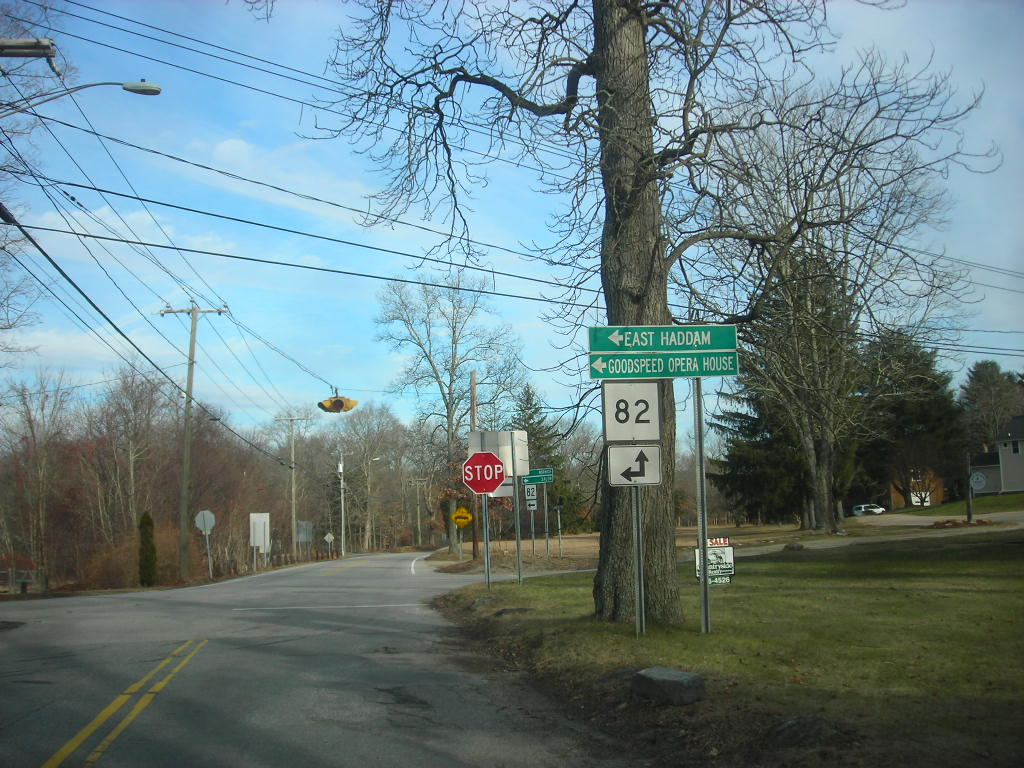
Route 148 at the junction with Route 82 in Lyme

The Killingworth to Chester route was chartered as a turnpike in 1816 known as the Chester and North Killingworth Turnpike and ran along Chester Road and West Main Street. In 1834, an eastward extension towards the Chester-Hadlyme Ferry (then privately owned and known as Warner's Ferry) by the same turnpike company was authorized. In the same year, another company, the Hadlyme Turnpike, was chartered to build a turnpike from the Lyme side of the ferry towards the town of Salem. In 1835, still another turnpike company, the Madison and North Killingworth Turnpike, was chartered to build a road from the end of the Chester and North Killingworth Turnpike to the village of North Madison, using Tooley Road, then Abner Lane, and now abandoned roads across Lake Hammonasset. This series of turnpikes was envisioned by its proponents as part of an all-turnpike route between New Haven and Norwich. The business proved unprofitable, however, and between the years of 1842 and 1847, the various turnpike companies along the Route 148 alignment were dissolved and the roads turned over to the towns.

Modern Route 148 was established as part of the 1932 state highway renumbering and originally ran from Route 81 in Killingworth to the Hadlyme railroad station in Lyme. In 1951, the eastern terminus was moved to the Chester ferry landing. In 1962, it was extended westward to Route 79 along its current alignment, and also eastward from the Hadlyme ferry landing to Route 82 (along former SR 618).

== Junction list ==
County	Location	mi	km	Destinations	Notes
Middlesex	Killingworth	0.00	0.00	Route 79 – Madison, Durham	Western terminus
Middlesex	Killingworth	6.88	11.07	Route 81 – Clinton, Higganum	
Middlesex	Chester	10.27	16.53	Route 145 south – Deep River	Northern terminus of Route 145
Middlesex	Chester	11.93	19.20	Route 9 – Old Saybrook, Middletown	Exit 8 on Route 9
Middlesex	Chester	14.07	22.64	Route 154 – Haddam, Deep River	
Connecticut River		14.75	23.74	Chester–Hadlyme Ferry (Open April 1–November 30)	
New London	Lyme	14.88	23.95	Geer Hill Road (SSR 431 north) – Gillette Castle State Park	
New London	Lyme	16.35	26.31	Route 82 – East Haddam, Salem	Eastern terminus
1.000 mi = 1.609 km; 1.000 km = 0.621 mi
