= Connecticut Route 81 =

State highway in Middlesex County, Connecticut, US

Route 81
- Map of Middlesex County in southern Connecticut with Route 81 highlighted in red

Route information
- Maintained by CTDOT
- Length: 15.75 mi (25.35 km)
- Existed: 1932–present

Major junctions
- South end: US 1 in Clinton
- I-95 in Clinton; Route 9 in Haddam
- North end: Route 154 in Haddam

Location
- Country: United States
- State: Connecticut
- Counties: Middlesex

Highway system
- Connecticut State Highway System; Interstate; US; State; SSR; SR; Scenic
← Route 80	→ Route 82

Route 81 is a state highway in Connecticut from Clinton center through Killingworth center to the village of Higganum in the town of Haddam.

== Route description ==
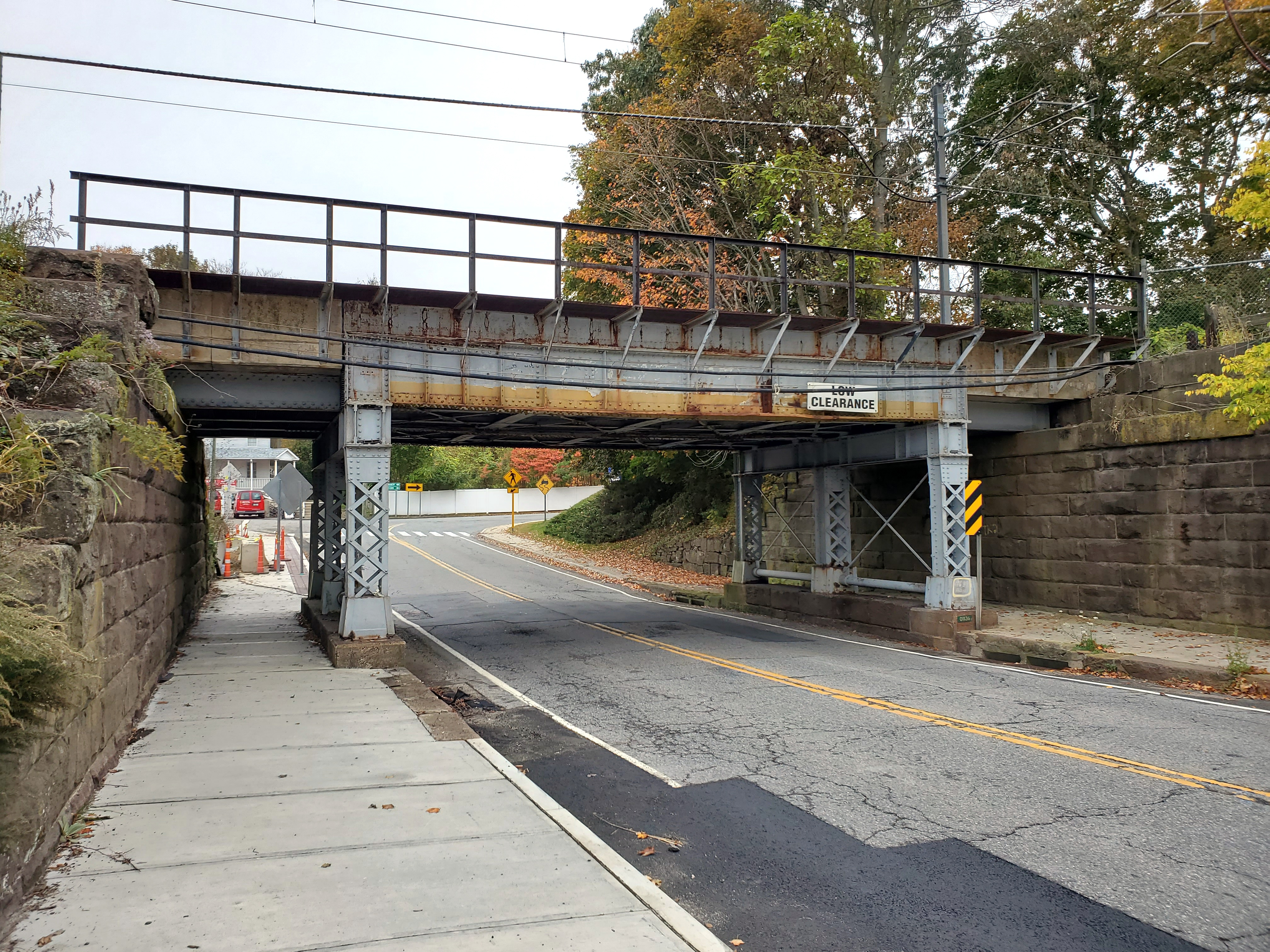
Northeast Corridor railway bridge over Hull Street (Route 81) in Clinton

Route 81 begins at an intersection with U.S. Route 1 (US 1) in the town center of Clinton and heads north as Hull Street then quickly shifts to High Street. It intersects with Interstate 95 (I-95) about 0.7 miles (1.1 km) north of US 1 and passes in front of the Clinton Crossing outlet mall before heading into the town of Killingworth. North of I-95 in Clinton, the road is known as Killingworth Turnpike. In Killingworth, Route 81 becomes Clinton Road and has a junction with Route 80 south of the town center at a rotary. North of Route 80, the road becomes known as Higganum Road, intersecting with Route 148 north of the town center before crossing into the town of Haddam. In Haddam, Route 81 is known as Killingworth Road and has an interchange with Route 9 before ending at an intersection with Route 154 in the village of Higganum.

== History ==
In the 19th century, the road connecting the villages of Clinton, Killingworth, and Higganum was a private turnpike known as the Killingworth and Haddam Turnpike. The turnpike was chartered in 1813 and collected tolls until 1850. In 1922, the length of the old turnpike was designated as a state road with designation State Highway 106. As part of the 1932 state highway renumbering, modern Route 81 was created from old Highway 106.

== Junction list ==
The entire route is in Middlesex County.

Location	mi	km	Destinations	Notes
Clinton	0.00	0.00	US 1 – Madison, Westbrook	Southern terminus
Clinton	0.73	1.17	I-95 – New London, New Haven	Exit 68 on I-95
Killingworth	5.98	9.62	Route 80 – Deep River, North Madison	Roundabout
Killingworth	8.29	13.34	Route 148 – Chester, Durham	
Haddam	13.97	22.48	Route 9 – Old Saybrook, Middletown	Exit 15 on Route 9
Haddam	15.75	25.35	Route 154 – Middletown, Haddam	Northern terminus
1.000 mi = 1.609 km; 1.000 km = 0.621 mi
