= Hadlyme Ferry Historic District =

Historic district in Connecticut, United States

- U.S. National Register of Historic Places
- U.S. Historic district
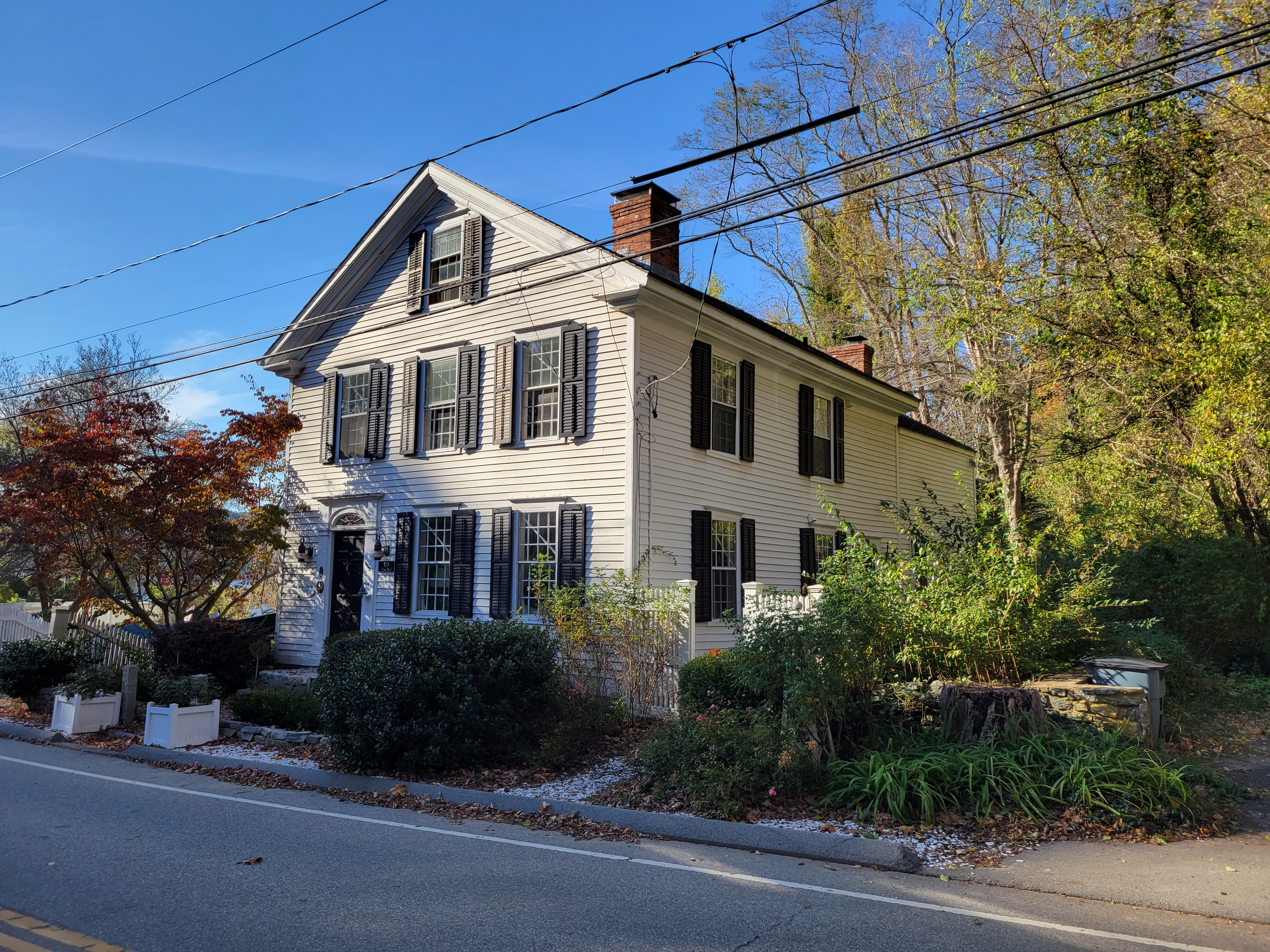
- Samuel Brooks House

- Location within Connecticut Location within the United States
- Location: 150, 151, 158, 159, 162-1, 162-2 Ferry Road and ferry slip, Hadlyme, Lyme, Connecticut
- Coordinates: 41°25′9″N 72°25′41″W
- Area: 11.5 acres (4.7 ha)
- Architectural style: Federal, Colonial
- NRHP reference No.: 94001444
- Added to NRHP: December 21, 1994

The Hadlyme Ferry Historic District encompasses a collection of historic buildings related to the Chester–Hadlyme Ferry in the Hadlyme village of Lyme, Connecticut. It is located at the eastern end of the ferry route across the Connecticut River, where ferries have been documented to run since 1769. The district includes six houses dating to the late 18th or early 19th century, as well as the site of the ferry slip. It was listed on the National Register of Historic Places in 1994.

== Description and history ==
The lower Connecticut River was not bridged until the early 20th century. Settled in the mid-17th century, ferry services on the river were important for the movement of people and goods, and also acted as hubs for commerce. The first formal permit to operate a ferry between Hadlyme and Chester was issued in 1769 to Jonathan Warner, but some documents suggest that a ferry may have been run as early as the 1690s. The oldest of the buildings at the ferry was built in 1760; it is a typical Georgian house, to which a Federal style entrance surround was added in the late 18th or early 19th century.

The district extends from the ferry slip, up Connecticut Route 148 (Ferry Road) to its junction with Geer Hill Road. The terrain slopes upward from the river fairly steeply, leaving little room for development. The district is bounded on the north by Gillette Castle State Park. The six houses in the district were all built before 1820, and have either Federal or colonial Georgian style. One of the buildings may have served as a shop.

The contributing properties include:

- Samuel Brooks House, 151 Ferry Road, c. 1760, Colonial in form but with a "fine Federal doorway surround"
- Isaac Spenser House, 162-1 Ferry Road, 1790, also Colonial in its 5 bay form, with a Federal style doorway including fanlight in doorway's pediment.
- William Spencer House, 1805.
- 159 Ferry Road, c. 1800, gable-fronted.
- Comstock House, 150 Ferry Road, c. 1820, gable-fronted, later Federal style house with a fanlight in its tympanum.
- Ferry House, 162-2 Ferry Road, c. 1780.
- Ferry slip site.

Non-contributing structures in the district include four garages from early 20th century and assorted small buildings associated with the ferry. Note, unlike in some other historic districts around ferry sites, the course of the ferry itself is not included in the district. The modern ferry is regarded as a periodic intrusion into views of the historic district.

== See also ==
- National Register of Historic Places listings in New London County, Connecticut
