= Chester–Hadlyme Ferry =

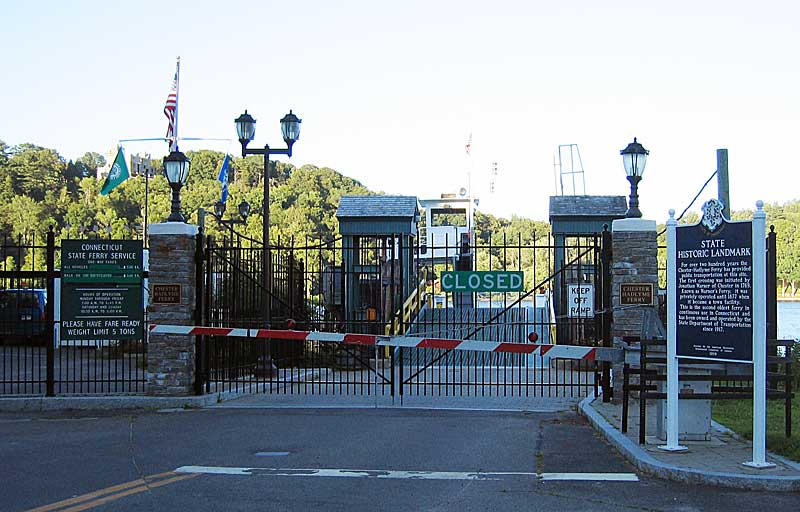
- Chester–Hadlyme ferry after closing time
- Locale: Lower Connecticut River Valley; Chester, Connecticut, to the village of Hadlyme from 41.419272°N 72.433142°W to 41.420152°N 72.428622°W
- Waterway: Connecticut River
- Route: Route 148
- Operator: Connecticut State Ferry Service
- Authority: Connecticut Department of Transportation (ConnDOT)
- Began operation: 1769
- Predecessor: Warner's Ferry
- Travel time: 5 minutes
- Frequency: as needed
- No. of vessels: 1 (Selden III)
- Daily vehicles: 100
- Connections at Chester Dock
- Train: Essex Steam Train at Hadlyme station
- Bus: River Valley Transit 644 at Route 154 & Kings Highway
- Website: portal.ct.gov

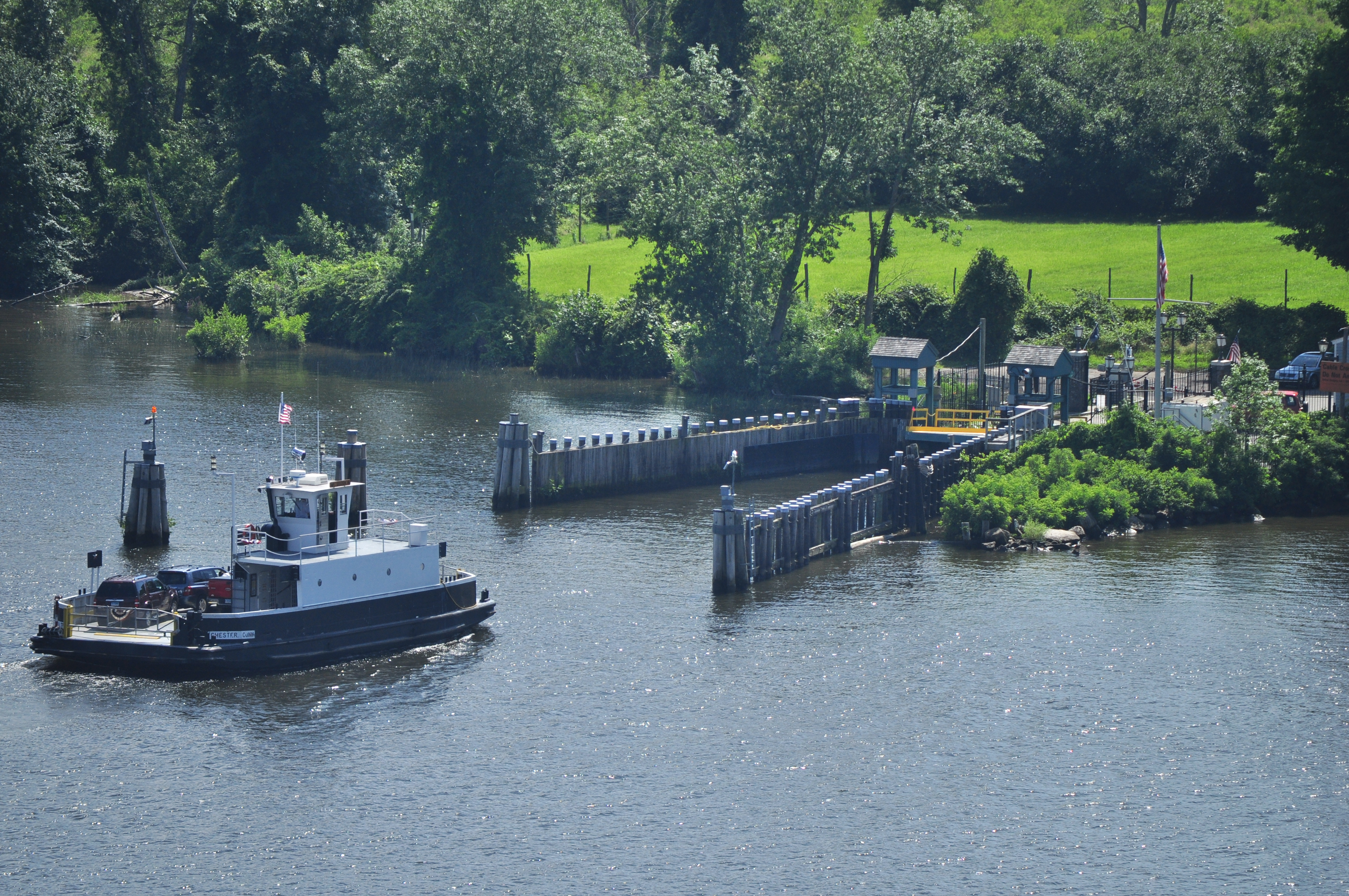
The Selden III approaching the dock, seen from the grounds of Gillette Castle.

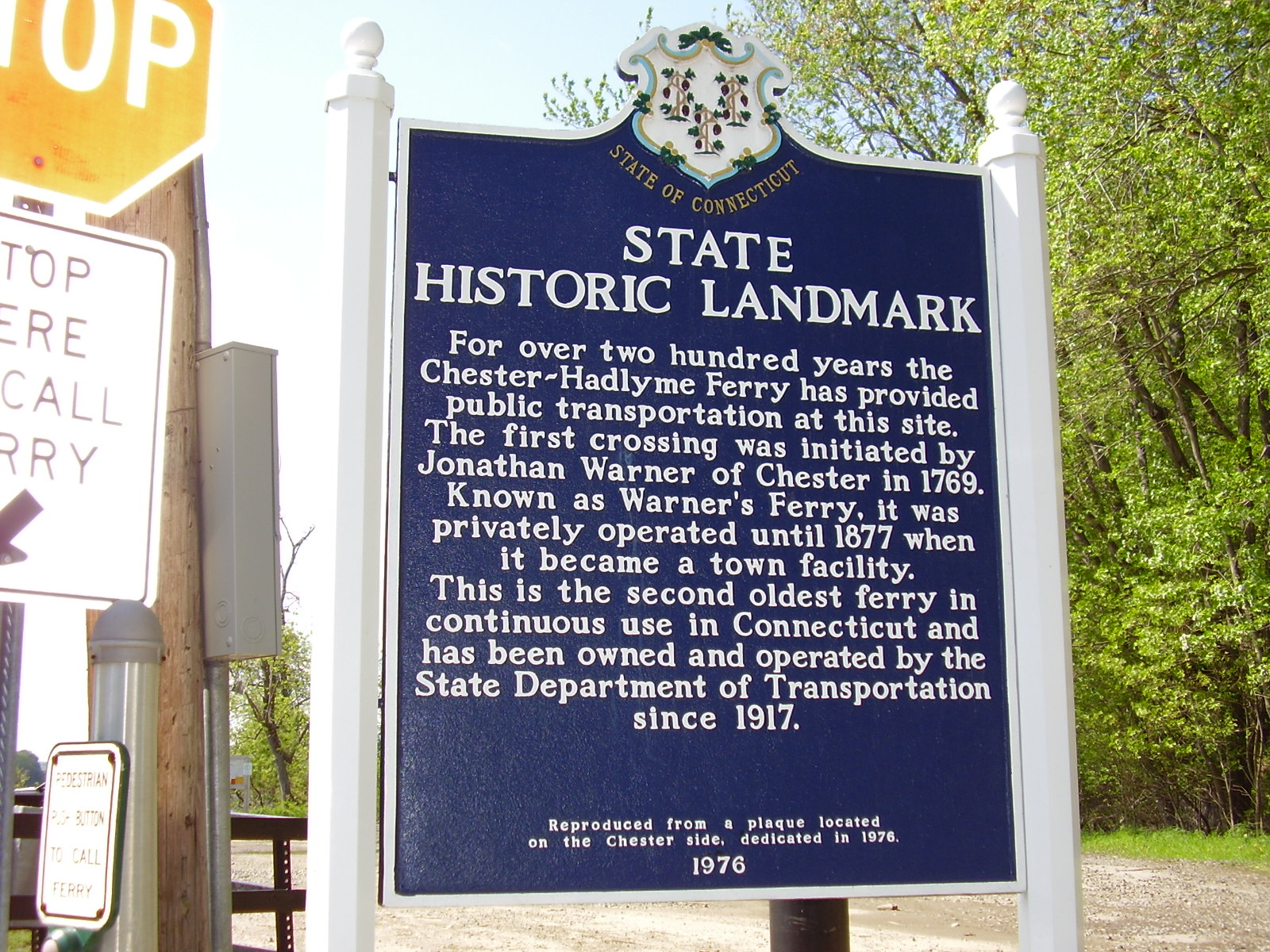
Connecticut historical marker found at the loading areas on both sides of the river. Above image is on the Lyme side.

The Chester–Hadlyme Ferry is a seasonal ferry crossing the Connecticut River between the town of Chester, Connecticut, and the village of Hadlyme (in the town of Lyme, Connecticut). It is the second oldest continuously operating ferry service in the state of Connecticut and is a state-designated historical landmark. The ferry is part of the scenic portion of Route 148 and provides a convenient link between two of Connecticut's tourist attractions: Gillette Castle State Park in Hadlyme and the Essex Steam Train, which runs between Essex and Chester.

== Operations ==
The Chester–Hadlyme Ferry operates during the daytime between April 1 and November 30. The toll for cars is $5 on weekdays or $6 on weekends, and it is $2 for cyclists and pedestrians. For frequent vehicle commuters, a discounted rate of $2.50 is available through the use of pre-purchased coupons. The current ferry boat is named Selden III, measuring 65 feet by 30 feet, and can accommodate 8 to 9 cars and 49 passengers. The crossing usually takes about five minutes. An average of 100 vehicles use the ferry every day. The ferry operates on an as-needed basis; during its operating hours, it waits to depart Chester until either a full load of passengers and/or cars board, or until someone requests the ferry on the Hadlyme side by pushing a button which activates a flashing light visible to the ferry crew.

== History ==
Jonathan Warner of Chester, who owned land on both sides of the river, started a ferry service at this location in 1769. It was then known as Warner's Ferry and utilized a raft propelled using a nail and long poles. Warner's Ferry was the seventh ferry that was established in the Lower Connecticut River Valley. Before it was established, travelers and goods needing to be ferried across this reach of the river could cross downstream between Saybrook and Old Lyme, which were connected by ferry as early as 1662, or upstream at Haddam and East Haddam, where a ferry began operating as early as 1664.

The ferry was often used throughout the American Revolution to transport supplies across the Connecticut River.

Between 1834 and 1846, Warner's Ferry became the terminus for two turnpikes – the Hadlyme Turnpike and the Chester and North Killingworth Second Turnpike – both chartered with the hope of creating a direct, straight-line route between New Haven and Norwich.

In 1877, Warner's Ferry came under the supervision of the Town of Chester. Soon after this, a steam-powered barge was put in service and the ferry was renamed the Chester–Hadlyme Ferry. The Connecticut state government took over operations in 1917 after the Connecticut General Assembly passed laws assigning all river crossings to the Highway Department in 1915; currently the Connecticut Department of Transportation operates the ferry.

The Hadlyme Ferry Historic District, which includes the ferry slip and 6 buildings on the east side of the crossing, was listed on the National Register of Historic Places in 1994.

The Ferry was to be closed by the state on August 25, 2011 as part of the state budget cuts. The move to close the ferry was widely unpopular in surrounding towns and grassroots efforts began to save the ferry. Some residents believe that there are several state statutes that could possibly prevent the ferry from being closed. The state government rescinded its decision to close ferry service, and hence it continues to run.

== See also ==
- List of crossings of the Connecticut River
- Rocky Hill–Glastonbury ferry – the oldest continuously operating ferry service in the U.S.
