= Lower Connecticut River Valley =

Region of Connecticut, United States

Lower Connecticut River Valley Council of Governments (RiverCOG)
Agency overview
- Formed: 2013
- Jurisdiction: Lower Connecticut River Valley region
- Headquarters: 145 Denison Road, Essex, CT 06426
- Agency executive: Samuel S. Gold, Executive Director
- Website: rivercog.org

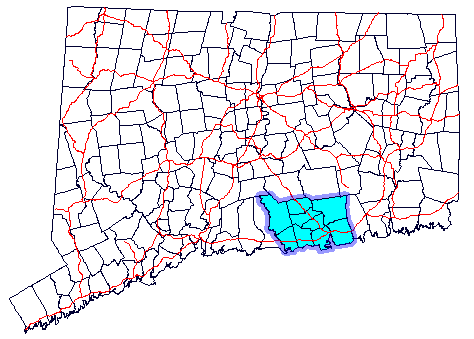
Map of Connecticut highlighting the Connecticut River Estuary region

The Lower Connecticut River Valley is a region of the state of Connecticut around the juncture where the Connecticut River meets Long Island Sound. It includes towns in Middlesex County and the western edge of New London County. It is located in the southeastern-central part of the state and includes the seventeen towns of Chester, Clinton, Cromwell, Deep River, Durham, East Haddam, East Hampton, Essex, Haddam, Killingworth, Lyme, Middlefield, Middletown, Old Lyme, Old Saybrook, Portland and Westbrook.

Route 154 (formerly Route 9A) runs along the river starting in Middletown and ending in Old Saybrook. The road is designated as a scenic highway, popular with motorcycle tourists. State Route 9 runs through Cromwell and Middletown and extends to the shoreline where it connects with Interstate 95 in Old Saybrook.

The region is known for its picturesque riverside scenery, small river and shoreline towns, and tourist attractions such as the Goodspeed Opera House, the Essex Steam Train, Brownstone Exploration and Discovery Park, Powder Ridge Mountain Park and Resort, the Traveler's Professional Golf Championship at TPC at River Highlands, Lyman Orchards, Lyman Orchards Golf Courses, Fox Hopyard Golf Course and Gillette Castle. Middletown, the region's largest town, is one of Connecticut's smaller cities and the location of Wesleyan University.

== History ==
The oldest archeological founds in the area have been dated back to circa 8000 BC (as of January 1984).

== Towns and cities ==
The following municipalities are members of the Lower Connecticut River Valley Council of Governments (LCRVCOG):

- Chester
- Clinton
- Cromwell
- Deep River
- Durham
- East Haddam
- East Hampton
- Essex
- Haddam
- Higganum
- Killingworth
- Lyme
- Middlefield
- Middletown
- Old Lyme
- Old Saybrook
- Portland
- Westbrook
