= Deep River Town Hall =

- U.S. National Register of Historic Places
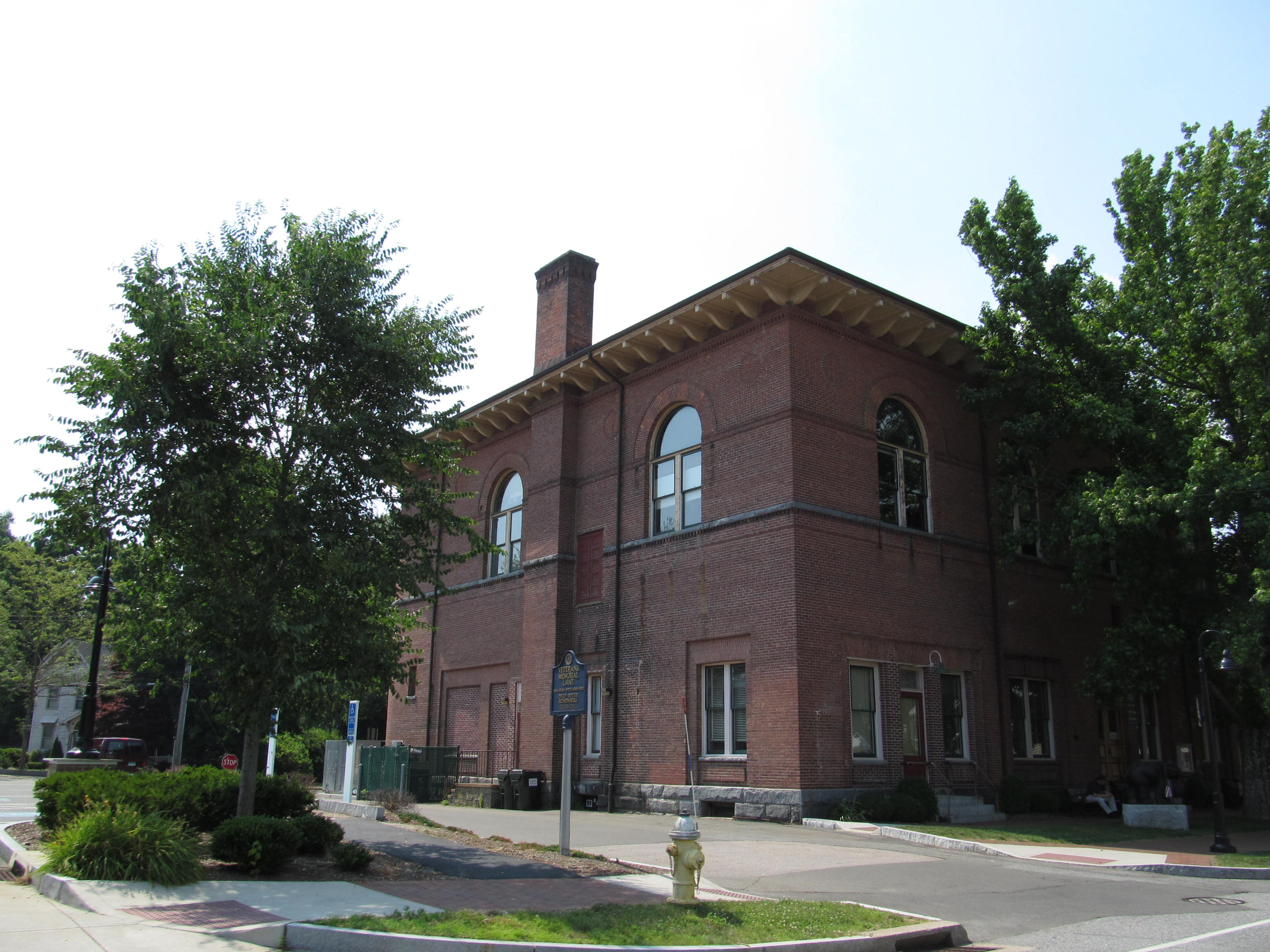

- Location within Connecticut Location within the United States
- Location: Route 80 and Route 154, Deep River, Connecticut
- Coordinates: 41°23′6″N 72°26′11″W
- Area: less than one acre
- Built: 1893
- Architectural style: "flatiron" building
- NRHP reference No.: 76001977
- Added to NRHP: January 1, 1976

The Deep River Town Hall is located at the junction of Connecticut Routes 80 and 154 in Deep River, Connecticut. Completed in 1893, it is unusual for its distinctively urban styling in a quiet rural suburban community. The building was listed on the National Register of Historic Places on January 1, 1976.

== Description and history ==
The Deep River Town Hall is located near the southern end of the main village of Deep River, located in a triangular plot on the south side of the junction of Connecticut Routes 80 and 154, with a west-bound one-way street immediately to its south. In contrast to other village architecture, it is a three-story brick building, set up against the sidewalk on the main roads. A single bay faces the intersection, housing the main entrance in an arched recess, flanked by sidelight windows and topped by a semicircular transom window. The side elevations are nine bays, divided into groups of three; some of these groups have doors at the center, while others have windows. Upper-level windows are organized as pairs of sash windows topped by half-round transom windows. The building's roof has a projecting cornice lined with modillion blocks.

The town of Deep River's previous town hall was located adjacent to its post office, which was destroyed by fire in 1891. This building was constructed as a replacement in 1893, with town offices on the ground floor, and an auditorium space on the upper floors. It is an unusually large structure for an otherwise relatively rural community.

== See also ==
- National Register of Historic Places listings in Middlesex County, Connecticut
