= Connecticut Route 154 =

State highway in Middlesex County, Connecticut, US

Route 154
- Map of Middlesex County in southern Connecticut with Route 154 highlighted in red

Route information
- Maintained by CTDOT
- Length: 28.24 mi (45.45 km)
- Existed: 1932 (extended 1967)–present

Major junctions
- South end: US 1 in Old Saybrook
- I-95 in Old Saybrook; Route 9 in Old Saybrook; Route 9 / Route 153 in Essex
- North end: Route 9 in Higganum

Location
- Country: United States
- State: Connecticut
- Counties: Middlesex

Highway system
- Connecticut State Highway System; Interstate; US; State; SSR; SR; Scenic
← Route 153	→ Route 155
← Route 9	9A	→ Route 10

Route 154 is a state highway in Connecticut running for 28.24 miles (45.45 km). It serves as one of the main thoroughfares in the town of Old Saybrook, intersecting twice with U.S. Route 1 (US 1). North of Interstate 95 (I-95), Route 154 runs parallel to Route 9, along to the west bank of the Connecticut River. The route ends in Higganum at Route 9.

== Route description ==
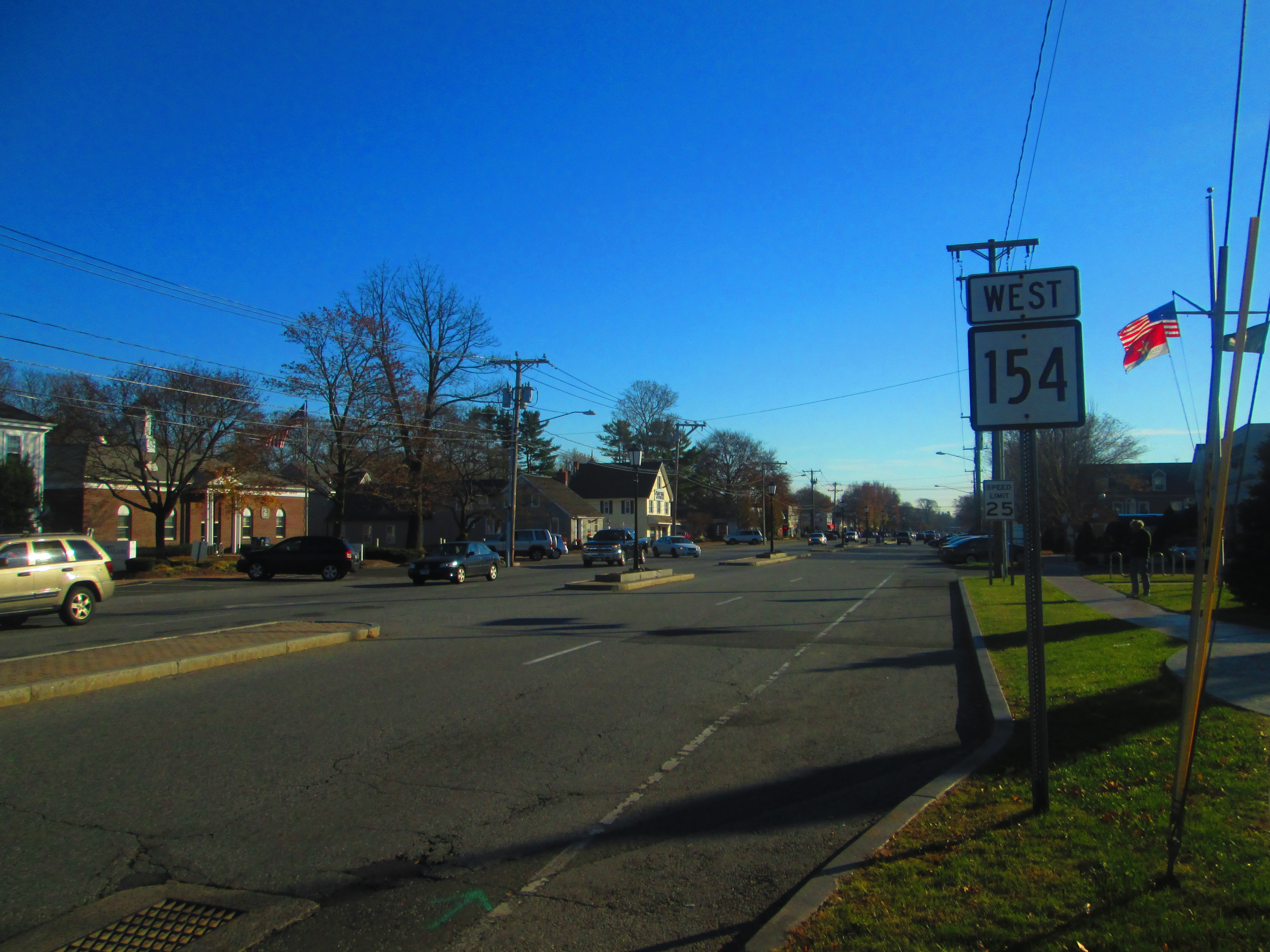
Route 154 just after US 1 in Old Saybrook

Route 154 begins at US 1 in Old Saybrook. It heads south on Great Hammock Road as it is parallel to the Long Island Sound. It becomes known as Plum Bank Road, shortly before turning eastward as Indianola Drive as it enters Knollwood. Maple Avenue turns on to Route 154 as it enters Fenwick. It passes by the Fenwick Golf Course just prior to passing over the South Cove. It becomes Bridge Street for a short time before executing a sharp turn to the west as College Street, and later Main Street.

Route 154 soon turns north, passing just to the west of North Cove. It then becomes concurrent with US 1 prior to intersecting I-95 as the Middlesex Turnpike. Proceeding north, it intersects Route 9 before passing near South Cove, a separate cove than the one previously crossed over, although they are both an extension of the Connecticut River. It then intersects Route 9 again, before turning slightly east of north, and intersecting it for a third time. It then becomes known as Main Street while traveling parallel to the Connecticut River. It then intersects Route 148.

Route 154 becomes known as Saybrook Road before becoming concurrent with Route 82. It passes near the Haddam Meadows State Park as it once again becomes known as the Middlesex Turnpike. It intersects Route 81 as it becomes known as Saybrook Road again. Route 154 travels closely parallel to Route 9 near its north end. At the exit 10 interchange of Route 9, Route 154 continues as the Route 9 northbound onramp for its last 0.2 miles (0.32 km), until it ends at the merge with northbound Route 9.

The southern loop portion of Route 154 in Old Saybrook, from its beginning at Saybrook Manor (milepost 0.00) to the east junction with Old Boston Post Road in Old Saybrook Center (milepost 6.10) is a state scenic road. This portion of Route 154 serves the borough of Fenwick. The section of Route 154 in the town of Haddam (9.16 miles long) is also a state scenic road. This portion of the route runs alongside the west bank of the Connecticut River.

== History ==
The road connecting Old Saybrook and Wethersfield along the west bank of the Connecticut River was a toll road known as the Middlesex Turnpike, which operated from 1802 to 1876. In 1922, the Middlesex Turnpike alignment became part of New England Interstate Route 10 (renumbered to Route 9 in 1932). At the same time, a loop route in Old Saybrook, serving the borough of Fenwick was designated as State Highway 338.

Route 154 was established in 1932 as a renumbering of old State Highway 338. Its original route started at US 1 in Old Saybrook Center and followed Main Street then College Street to Saybrook Point, then continued through Fenwick along Maple Avenue to end at itself just south of the town center. In 1935, a section of Maple Avenue between Summerfield Road and Main Street was redesignated Route 154A and the western part of the loop moved to the current alignment along Plum Bank Road and Great Hammock Road (former SR 603). In 1963, Route 154A was turned over to the town of Old Saybrook.

In 1967, with the opening of the Route 9 freeway, the former surface route of Route 9 between US 1 and Essex Road in Old Saybrook was transferred to Route 154. The rest of the former surface route of Route 9 became Route 9A in 1968. In 1986, the entire length of Route 9A was transferred to Route 154, extending the northern terminus to its current location in southern Middletown.

== Junction list ==
The entire route is in Middlesex County.

Location	mi	km	Destinations	Notes
Old Saybrook	0.00	0.00	US 1 – Old Lyme, Westbrook	Southern terminus
Old Saybrook	6.68	10.75	US 1 south	Southern end of US 1 concurrency
Old Saybrook	7.11	11.44	US 1 north to I-95 north – New London	Northern end of US 1 concurrency
Old Saybrook	7.34	11.81	I-95 south – New Haven	Exit 76 on I-95
Old Saybrook	8.64	13.90	Route 9 to I-95 – New London, New Haven, Middletown	Exit 2 on Route 9
Essex	11.09	17.85	Route 9 / Route 153 south – Essex, Middletown, Westbrook	Northern terminus of Route 153; exit 3 on Route 9
Essex	11.84	19.05	Main Street (SR 602 west) / Westbrook Road (SR 604 south)	
Essex	12.60	20.28	Route 9 – Old Saybrook, Middletown	Exit 5 on Route 9
Deep River	14.41	23.19	Route 80 west – Killingworth	Eastern terminus of Route 80
Chester	16.33	26.28	Route 148 – Killingworth, Hadlyme	Hadlyme via Chester-Hadlyme Ferry (April 1–November 30)
Haddam	19.10	30.74	Route 82 west to Route 9 – Middletown, Old Saybrook	Roundabout; southern end of Route 82 concurrency
Haddam	19.47	31.33	Route 82 east – East Haddam	Northern end of Route 82 concurrency
Haddam	25.71	41.38	Route 81 south – Killingworth, Clinton	Northern terminus of Route 81
Higganum	28.24	45.45	Route 9 – New Britain, Old Saybrook	Northern terminus; exit 19 on Route 9
1.000 mi = 1.609 km; 1.000 km = 0.621 mi: Concurrency terminus
