= Hadlyme North Historic District =

Historic district in Connecticut, United States

- U.S. National Register of Historic Places
- U.S. Historic district
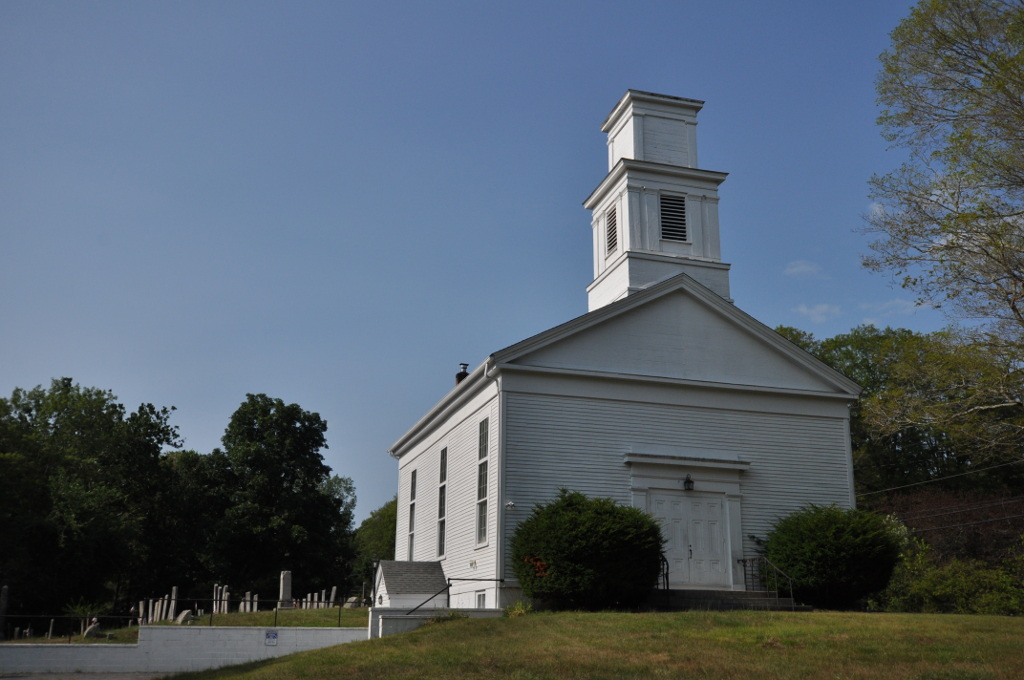
- Hadlyme Congregational Church

- Location within Connecticut Location within the United States
- Location: Roughly bounded by CT 82, Town Street, Banning Road, and Old Town Street, East Haddam, Connecticut
- Coordinates: 41°25′45″N 72°24′25″W
- Area: 81 acres (33 ha)
- Architectural style: Colonial; Mid 19th Century Revival; Postmedieval English
- NRHP reference No.: 88002686
- Added to NRHP: December 8, 1988

The Hadlyme North Historic District is an 81-acre (33 ha) historic district located in the southwest corner of the town of East Haddam, Connecticut (just north of the town line with Lyme, which doubles as the county line between Middlesex and New London Counties). It represents the historic core of the village of Hadlyme, which straddles the town line, and consists primarily of two north-south roads, Town Street (Route 82 and Old Town Street). The village arose around a church society founded in 1743, and grew with the development of small industries along area waterways. It was listed on the National Register of Historic Places in 1988.

== Description and history ==
The name Hadlyme was formed of a combination of the names of the two townships in which it is located: Haddam and Lyme. East Haddam was incorporated as a separate town from Haddam in 1734. There were three churches established in East Haddam in the following years, including the Hadlyme Ecclesiastical Society, which was founded in 1742. That congregation met in buildings in the village center until 1890, and was one of its main civic focuses. Industry in the village center was limited, because Hungerford Brook, which runs between Town Street and Old Town Street, did not provide very much power. Traces of a tannery remain, as does a mill pond associated with an otherwise undocumented endeavour.

The historic district includes 39 contributing buildings and 12 non-contributing buildings. There are 16 houses, in styles ranging from Georgian (built c. 1750) to the early 20th century Colonial Revival; while most are well preserved, they are not of great architectural significance. Three churches stand in the district, of which only the Hadlyme Congregational Church building (an 1840 Greek Revival edifice) is still in active use. The village cemetery, founded in 1750, is just north of the church.

The larger Hadlyme area is bordered to the west by the Connecticut River where a ferry to Chester still runs (Route 148). The ferry and dock were where shipments along the river would be received, primarily by not exclusively for Gillette Castle (Formerly Seventh Sister) during the late 1800s.

The intersection of Route 82 and Route 148 is known as Hadlyme "Four Corners". The post office for the district is located here (US ZIP 06371) as well as a country store and carriage factory turned antique shop.

== Notable people ==
- Lurana W. Sheldon
- Alice Hamilton

== See also ==
- Hadlyme Ferry Historic District
- National Register of Historic Places listings in New London County, Connecticut
- National Register of Historic Places listings in Middlesex County, Connecticut
