= John Leander Billard =

American coal merchant (1842–1924)

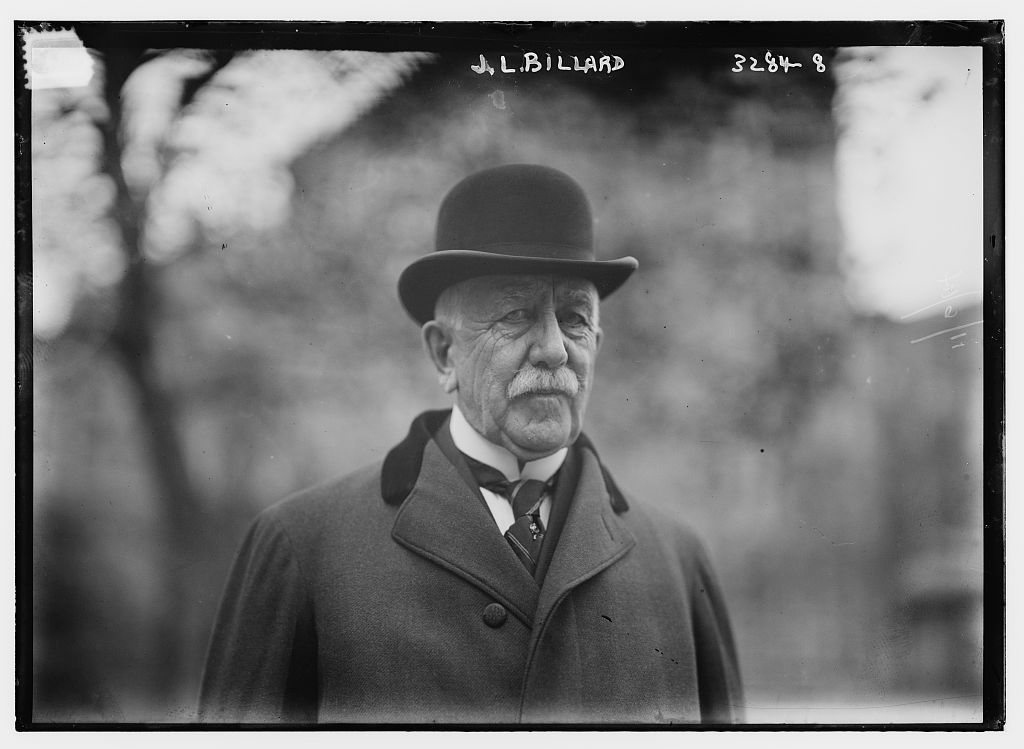
- Billard in 1914
- Born: July 18, 1842; Saybrook, Connecticut
- Died: December 18, 1924 (aged 82)

John Leander Billard (July 18, 1842 - December 18, 1924) was a coal merchant. He initiated a hostile takeover of the Boston and Maine Railroad in 1914.

== Biography ==
He was born on July 18, 1842, in Saybrook, Connecticut, to John Denton Billard and Emeline E. Spencer. He attended Yale University. Billard married Harriet Yale Merriman on May 26, 1868. They had four children, three of whom lived to adulthood. Their sons Walter S. Billard and Frederick Howell Billard (1873-1906) both attended Yale University. Billard spent most of his life in Meriden, Connecticut.

In 1914, he attempted a hostile takeover of the Boston and Maine Railroad.

He died on December 18, 1924.
