= Connecticut Route 82 =

State highway in southeastern Connecticut, US

Route 82
- Map of southeastern Connecticut with Route 82 highlighted in red

Route information
- Maintained by CTDOT
- Length: 28.47 mi (45.82 km)
- Existed: 1932–present

Major junctions
- West end: Route 9 in Chester
- Route 11 in Salem; Route 85 in Salem; I-395 / Route 2A in Norwich
- East end: Route 2 / Route 32 in Norwich

Location
- Country: United States
- State: Connecticut
- Counties: Middlesex, New London

Highway system
- Connecticut State Highway System; Interstate; US; State; SSR; SR; Scenic
← Route 81	→ Route 83

Route 82 is an east–west state highway in Connecticut running 28.47 miles (45.82 km) from Route 9 in Chester east to Route 2 in Norwich.

== Route description ==
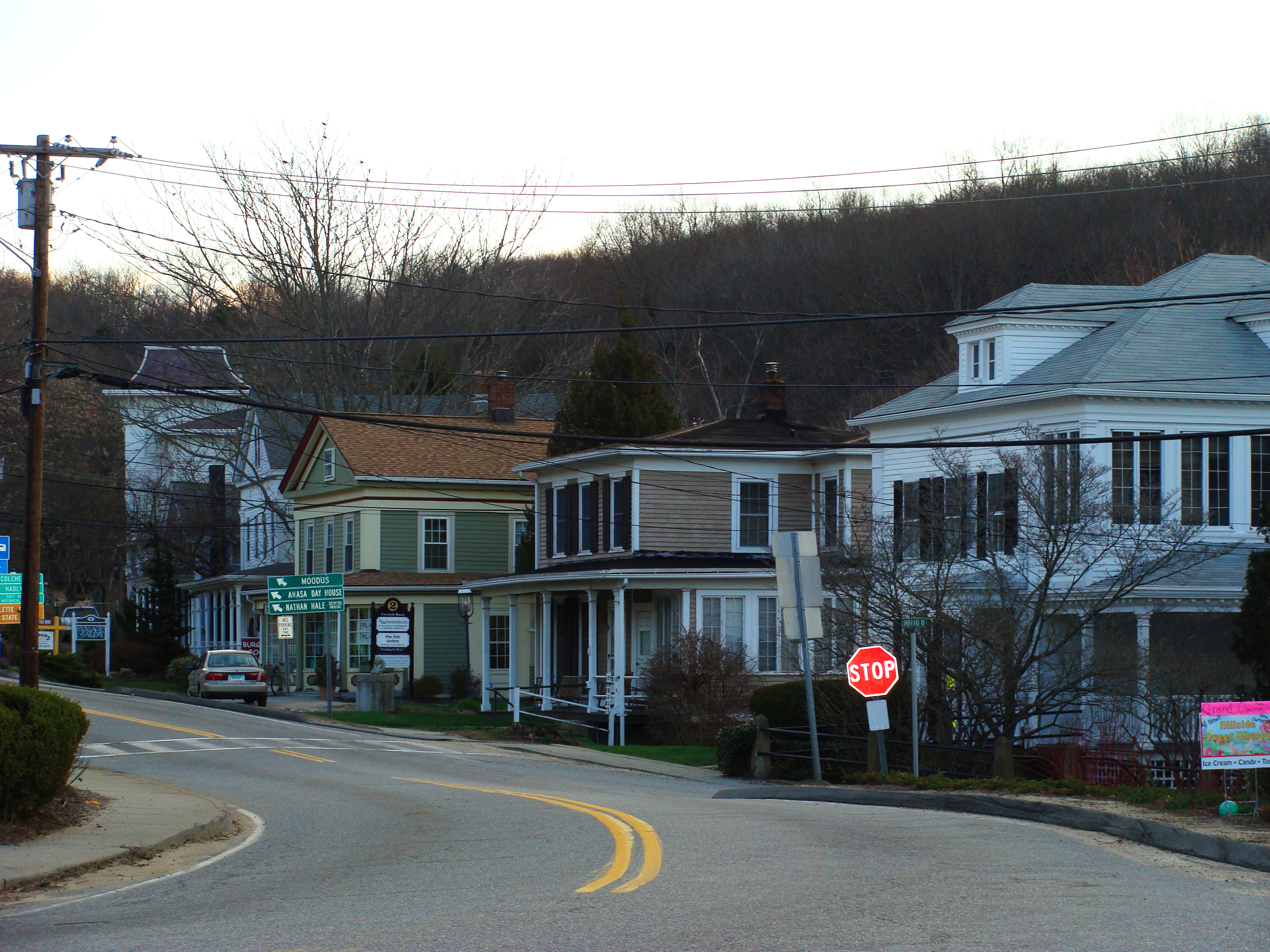
Route 82 in East Haddam

Route 82 begins at a trumpet intersection with Route 9 at exit 7 in Chester and heads northeast into Haddam as a three-lane undivided freeway to a roundabout with Route 154, where it becomes a two-lane surface road. The two routes briefly overlap before Route 82 continues east to the East Haddam Bridge over the Connecticut River, entering East Haddam near Goodspeed Opera House. On the east end of the village, it intersects the southern end of Route 149. At a junction with the south end of Route 151, Route 82 turns southeast and enters Lyme, where it turns east once again at a junction with the east end of Route 148. It then reenters East Haddam, where it passes the western end of Route 156 before entering Salem. In Salem, Route 82 continues northeast, meeting the south end of the Route 11 expressway, then meeting Route 85 at a roundabout. After passing the southern end of Route 354, Route 82 continues east into Montville, overlapping for 0.12 miles with Route 163. After briefly clipping Bozrah, it enters Norwich. In Norwich, it intersects Interstate 395 (I-395) at exit 11 before ending at a triangular one-way couplet in downtown Norwich, intersecting Route 2/Route 32 over two bridges across the Yantic River.

Route 82 is a designated scenic road for the length of the East Haddam Bridge between Haddam and East Haddam.

== History ==
Modern Route 82 east of Route 85 was built along the alignment of an early toll road known as the Salem and Norwich Turnpike, which was chartered in 1827 to connect its namesake cities. The toll road was extended west to the village of Hadlyme in 1834 by another turnpike corporation, which built the Hadlyme and Salem Turnpike. The road between East Haddam and Norwich, incorporating both turnpike alignments, was designated in 1922 as State Highway 153. In the 1932 state highway renumbering, old Highway 153 was renumbered to Route 82. The only major changes since then are the extension along a new limited-access road west of Route 154 to a trumpet interchange with Route 9 in 1971, and a reorganization of the eastern terminus in Norwich in the late 1980s.

== Junction list ==
County	Location	mi	km	Exit	Destinations	Notes
Middlesex	Chester	0.00	0.00		Route 9 south – Old Saybrook	Western terminus
Middlesex	Chester			1	Route 9 north – Middletown	Westbound exit and eastbound entrance; exit 10 on Route 9
Middlesex	Haddam	2.75	4.43	Eastern end of freeway section		
Middlesex	Haddam	2.75	4.43		Route 154 south – Chester	Roundabout; western end of Route 154 concurrency
Middlesex	Haddam	3.12	5.02		Route 154 north – Haddam	Eastern end of Route 154 concurrency
Middlesex	Connecticut River	3.70– 3.87	5.95– 6.23	East Haddam Bridge		
Middlesex	East Haddam	3.99	6.42		Route 149 north – Moodus	Southern terminus of Route 149
Middlesex	East Haddam	5.34	8.59		Route 151 north – Moodus	Southern terminus of Route 151
Middlesex	East Haddam	5.41	8.71		Mount Paranssus Road (SSR 434 east)	
Middlesex	East Haddam	6.51	10.48		River Road (SSR 431 south)	
New London	Lyme	9.26	14.90		Route 148 west – Chester	Eastern terminus of Route 148; via Chester-Hadlyme Ferry (April 1–November 30)
Middlesex	East Haddam	12.53	20.17		Route 156 east – Hamburg, Old Lyme	Northern terminus of Route 156
Middlesex	East Haddam	12.73	20.49		Mount Paranssus Road (SSR 434 west)	
New London	Salem	16.48	26.52		Route 11 north – Colchester, Hartford	Southern terminus of Route 11
New London	Salem	17.56	28.26		Route 85 – Colchester, New London	Roundabout
New London	Salem	20.20	32.51		Route 354 west – Colchester, Gardner Lake	Eastern terminus of Route 354
New London	Montville	21.31	34.30		Route 163 north – Fitchville	Western end of Route 163 concurrency
New London	Montville	21.43	34.49		Route 163 south – Oakdale, Montville	Eastern end of Route 163 concurrency
New London	Norwich	26.30	42.33		I-395 (Route 2A) – New Haven, Worcester	Exit 11 on I-395; former Route 52
New London	Norwich	28.29	45.53		Route 32 south – New London	Western end of Route 32 concurrency
New London	Norwich	28.47	45.82		Route 2 / Route 32 north – Willimantic, Hartford	Eastern terminus: eastern end of Route 32 concurrency
1.000 mi = 1.609 km; 1.000 km = 0.621 mi: Concurrency terminus; Incomplete access
