= Chester Center, Connecticut =

Census-designated place in Connecticut, United States

- Census-designated place
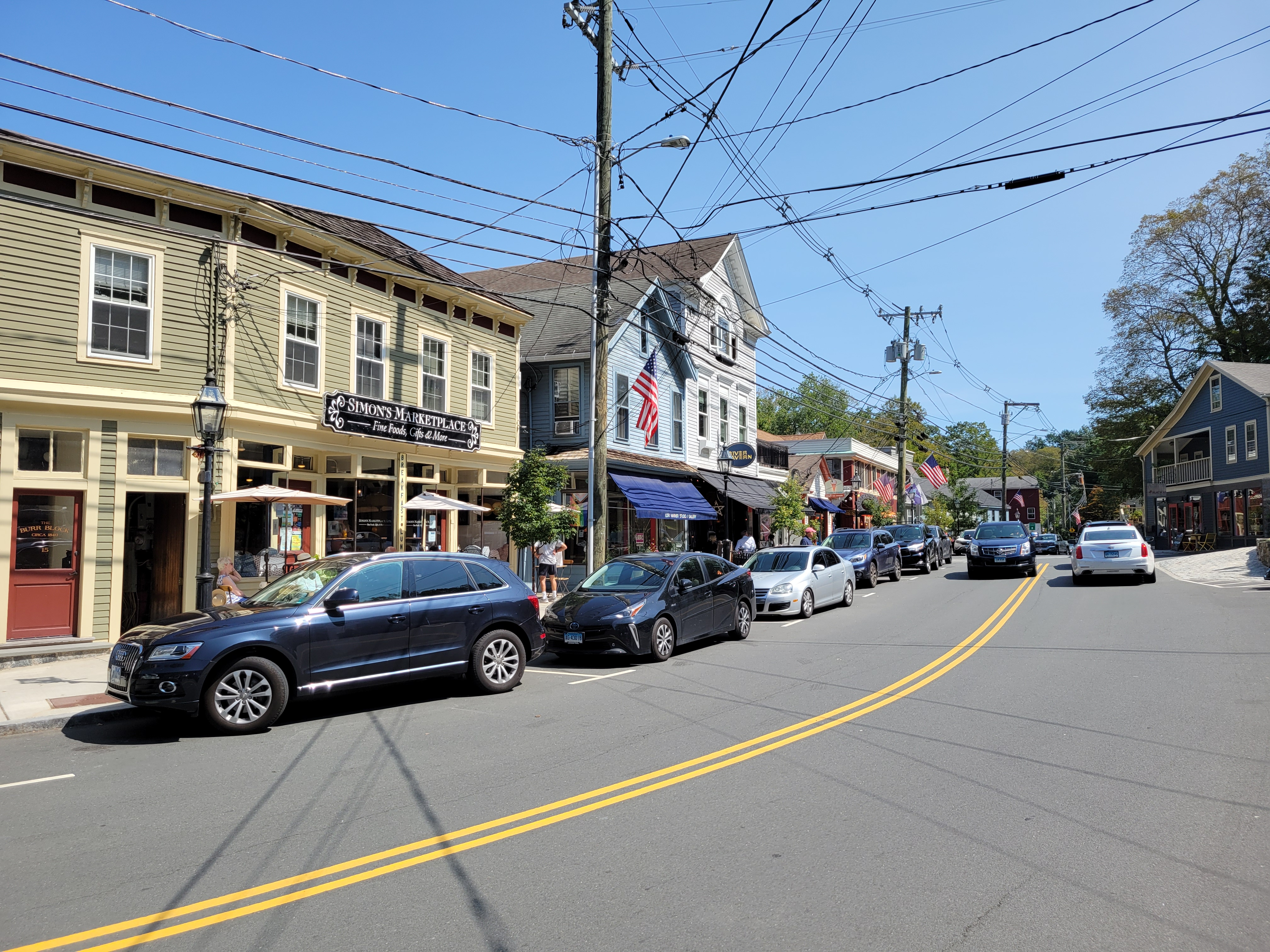
- Main Street

- Location within Connecticut Location within the United States
- Coordinates: 41°24′10″N 72°27′3″W
- Country: United States
- State: Connecticut
- County: Middlesex
- Town: Chester

Area
  - Total: 2.704 sq mi (7.00 km^{2})
  - Land: 2.676 sq mi (6.93 km^{2})
  - Water: 0.028 sq mi (0.073 km^{2})
- Elevation: 121 ft (37 m)

Population (2020)
  - Total: 1,720
  - Density: 642.8/sq mi (248.2/km^{2})
- Time zone: UTC-5 (Eastern (EST))
  - Summer (DST): UTC-4 (EDT)
- ZIP Code: 06412 (Chester)
- Area codes: 860/959
- FIPS code: 09-14370
- GNIS feature ID: 2378346

Chester Center is a census-designated place (CDP) comprising the primary village in the town of Chester, Middlesex County, Connecticut, United States. It is located in the southeastern corner of the town, bordered to the south by the town of Deep River and to the southwest largely by the Connecticut Route 9 freeway.

== Demographics ==
=== 2020 census ===
As of the 2020 census, Chester Center had a population of 1,720, out of 3,749 in the entire town of Chester. The median age was 52.9 years. 14.7% of residents were under the age of 18 and 28.6% of residents were 65 years of age or older. For every 100 females there were 94.6 males, and for every 100 females age 18 and over there were 95.7 males age 18 and over.

85.9% of residents lived in urban areas, while 14.1% lived in rural areas.

There were 744 households in Chester Center, of which 23.4% had children under the age of 18 living in them. Of all households, 49.7% were married-couple households, 19.1% were households with a male householder and no spouse or partner present, and 24.6% were households with a female householder and no spouse or partner present. About 29.9% of all households were made up of individuals and 13.8% had someone living alone who was 65 years of age or older.

There were 800 housing units, of which 7.0% were vacant. The homeowner vacancy rate was 2.3% and the rental vacancy rate was 5.4%.

Racial composition as of the 2020 census
Race	Number	Percent
White	1,581	91.9%
Black or African American	20	1.2%
American Indian and Alaska Native	1	0.1%
Asian	14	0.8%
Native Hawaiian and Other Pacific Islander	1	0.1%
Some other race	31	1.8%
Two or more races	72	4.2%
Hispanic or Latino (of any race)	73	4.2%
