= Deep River Center, Connecticut =

Census-designated place in Connecticut, United States

- Census-designated place
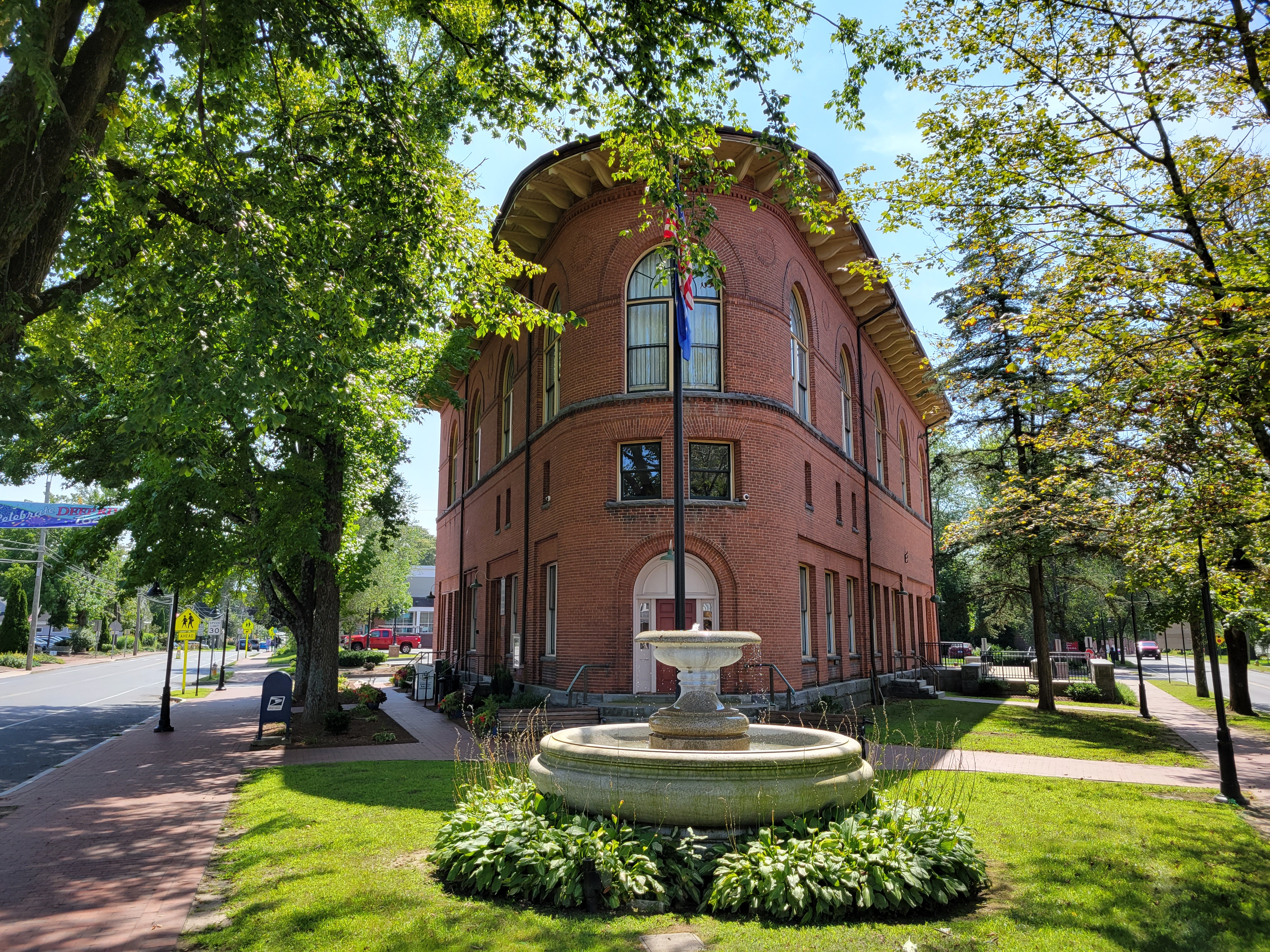
- Town Hall

- Location within Connecticut Location within the United States
- Coordinates: 41°23′7″N 72°26′7″W
- Country: United States
- State: Connecticut
- County: Middlesex
- Town: Deep River

Area
  - Total: 3.95 sq mi (10.22 km^{2})
  - Land: 3.80 sq mi (9.83 km^{2})
  - Water: 0.15 sq mi (0.38 km^{2})
- Elevation: 54 ft (16 m)

Population (2020)
  - Total: 2,765
  - Density: 728/sq mi (281.2/km^{2})
- Time zone: UTC-5 (Eastern (EST))
  - Summer (DST): UTC-4 (EDT)
- ZIP Code: 06417 (Deep River)
- Area codes: 860/959
- FIPS code: 09-19200
- GNIS feature ID: 2377814

Deep River Center is a census-designated place (CDP) comprising the primary village in the town of Deep River, Middlesex County, Connecticut, United States. It is in the east-central part of the town, bordered to the north by the town of Chester, to the south by the town of Essex, to the east by Pratt Cove, and to the northeast by the Connecticut River. As of the 2020 census, Deep River Center had a population of 2,765, out of 4,415 in the entire town of Deep River.

== Demographics ==
=== 2020 census ===
As of the 2020 census, Deep River Center had a population of 2,765, out of 4,415 in the entire town of Deep River. The median age was 49.5 years. 16.6% of residents were under the age of 18 and 24.7% of residents were 65 years of age or older. For every 100 females there were 95.1 males, and for every 100 females age 18 and over there were 93.4 males age 18 and over.

72.4% of residents lived in urban areas, while 27.6% lived in rural areas.

There were 1,279 households in Deep River Center, of which 23.1% had children under the age of 18 living in them. Of all households, 41.8% were married-couple households, 19.4% were households with a male householder and no spouse or partner present, and 29.9% were households with a female householder and no spouse or partner present. About 34.1% of all households were made up of individuals and 15.5% had someone living alone who was 65 years of age or older.

There were 1,377 housing units, of which 7.1% were vacant. The homeowner vacancy rate was 0.3% and the rental vacancy rate was 4.9%.

Racial composition as of the 2020 census
Race	Number	Percent
White	2,454	88.8%
Black or African American	46	1.7%
American Indian and Alaska Native	19	0.7%
Asian	34	1.2%
Native Hawaiian and Other Pacific Islander	0	0.0%
Some other race	32	1.2%
Two or more races	180	6.5%
Hispanic or Latino (of any race)	141	5.1%
