= Deep River, Connecticut =

- Town
- Town of Deep River
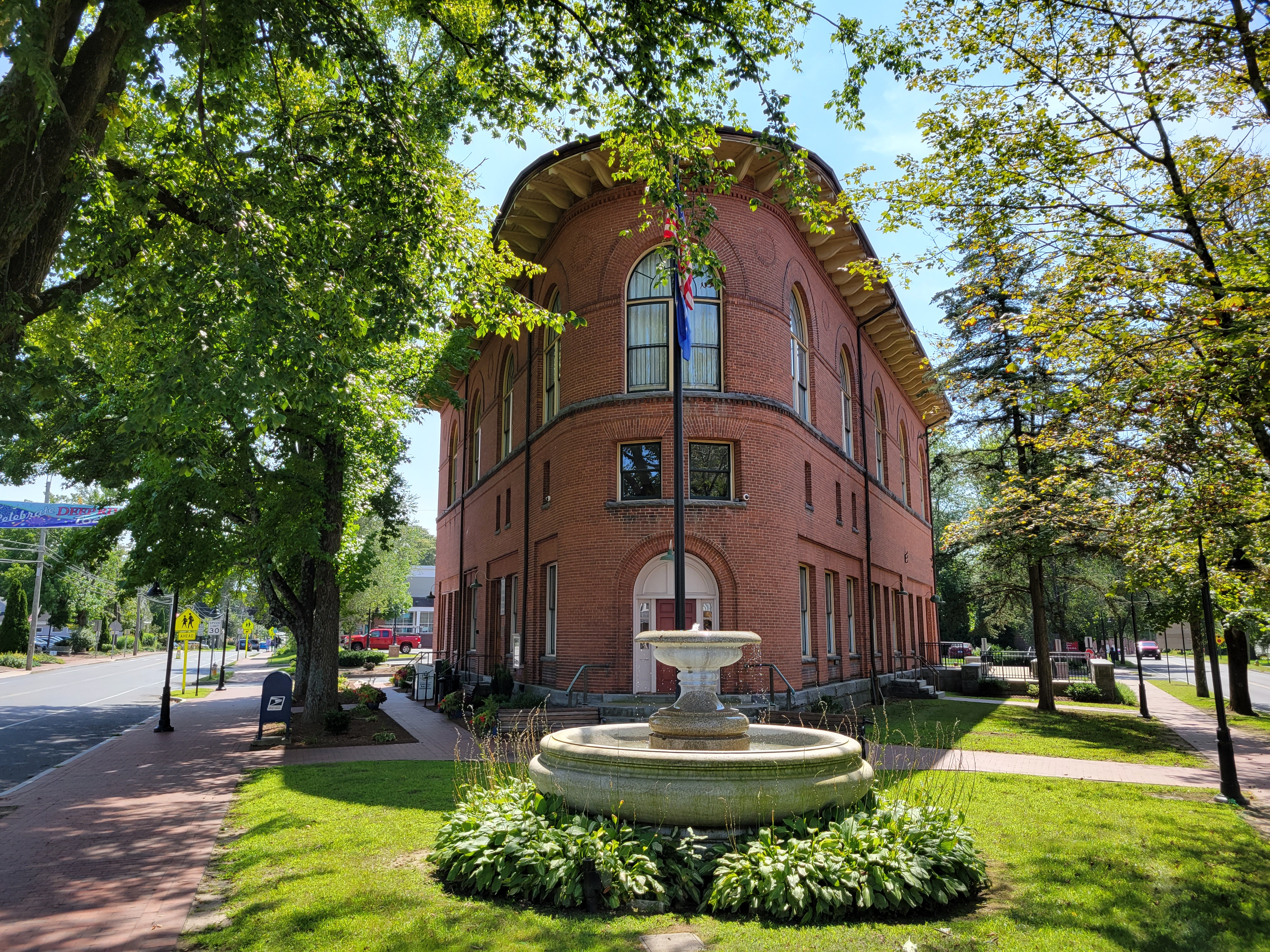
- Town Hall, Deep River

- Flag Seal
- Interactive map of Deep River, Connecticut
- Coordinates: 41°22′03″N 72°27′50″W
- Country: United States
- U.S. state: Connecticut
- County: Middlesex
- Region: Lower CT River Valley
- Established: 1635
- Name changed: 1947
- Named for: A Deep River referring to the Connecticut River

Government
  - Type: Selectman-town meeting
  - First selectman: Carol Jones (D)
  - Selectman: Duane Gates (D)
  - Selectman: James A. Olson (R)

Area
  - Total: 14.2 sq mi (36.8 km^{2})
  - Land: 13.6 sq mi (35.1 km^{2})
  - Water: 0.62 sq mi (1.6 km^{2})
- Elevation: 148 ft (45 m)

Population (2020)
  - Total: 4,415
  - Density: 326/sq mi (126/km^{2})
- Time zone: UTC-5 (Eastern)
  - Summer (DST): UTC-4 (Eastern)
- ZIP code: 06417, 06419
- Area codes: 860/959
- FIPS code: 09-19130
- GNIS feature ID: 0213417
- Website: www.deepriverct.us

Deep River is a town in Middlesex County, Connecticut, United States. The town is part of the Lower Connecticut River Valley Planning Region. The population was 4,415 at the 2020 census. The town center is designated by the U.S. Census Bureau as a census-designated place (CDP). Deep River is part of what the locals call the "Tri-town Area", made up of the towns of Deep River, Chester, and Essex.

== Geography ==
According to the United States Census Bureau, the town has a total area of 14.2 square miles (37 km^{2}), of which 13.6 square miles (35 km^{2}) is land and 0.6 square miles (1.6 km^{2}) (4.30%) is water. The CDP has a total area of 2.7 square miles (7.0 km^{2}), of which 4.38% is water.

=== Principal communities ===
- Deep River Center
- Winthrop

== History ==
Saybrook Colony formally joined Connecticut in 1644. The portion of the original colony east of the Connecticut River was set off as a separate town in 1665. The site of the present village of Deep River was said to have been owned by John, Nathaniel, and Philip Kirtland in 1723. The village of Winthrop was said to have been settled by Baptists as early as 1729. In the early to mid-19th century, various portions of Saybrook broke off as separate towns, starting from Chester in 1836 to Old Saybrook in 1854. In 1947, the town of Saybrook changed its name to "Deep River", matching the name of the town center village. The name "Deep River" was taken from the river/stream that once powered mills and factories that runs through it and not from the Connecticut River that is its eastern border. The actual Deep River stream begins at the border of its neighboring Town of Chester, in the western Winthrop section of town, on Cedar Swamp Road and flows through town to the stream that can be seen on Route 154, near Winter Avenue, empty onto the cove that connects to The Connecticut River.

=== Towns created from Saybrook Colony ===
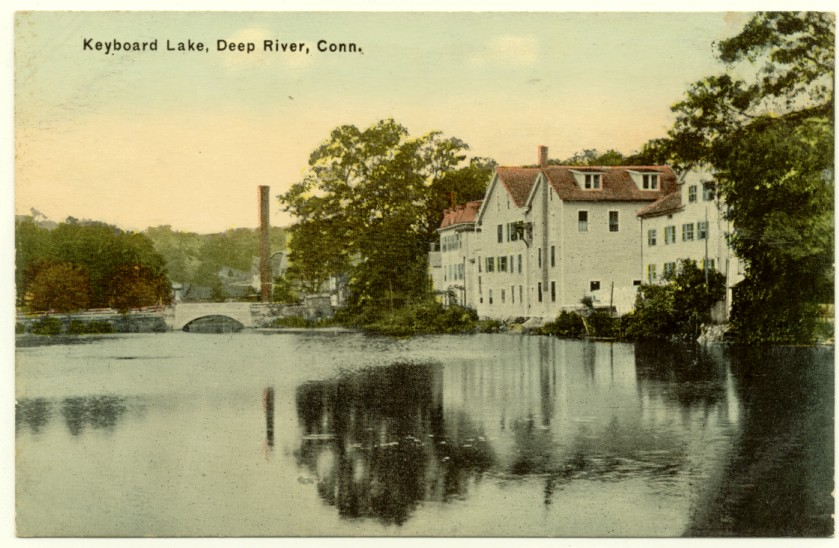
Keyboard Lake, from an early postcard

Saybrook Colony, along the mouth of the Connecticut River, was one of the early settlements in the area. Several towns broke off and incorporated separately over the course of time. The towns which were created from parts of Saybrook Colony are listed below.

- Lyme (originally East Saybrook) in 1665
  - East Lyme created from Lyme in 1839 (also partly from Waterford)
  - Old Lyme (originally South Lyme) created from Lyme in 1855
- Chester in 1836
- Westbrook in 1840
- Essex (originally Old Saybrook) in 1852
  - Old Saybrook created from Essex in 1854

=== Ivory ===
From 1840 to circa 1940, the U.S. was the world's biggest buyer of ivory and most of that ivory went to Deep River. Phineas Pratt developed an ivory lathe and eventually Deep River became known as "the queen of the valley" due to wealth from the ivory industry. The rival Comstock, Cheney & Company was established in nearby Ivoryton in the 1860s.

== Points of interest ==
These sites in town are on the National Register of Historic Places:

- Deep River Freight Station – 152 River Street; since December 21, 1994
- Deep River Town Hall – Connecticut Route 80 and Connecticut Route 154; since January 1, 1976
- Doris (Sailing yacht) – Connecticut River off River Road; located there when NRHP-listed, May 31, 1984
- Pratt, Read and Company Factory Complex – Main Street between Bridge and Spring Streets and 5 Bridge Street; since August 30, 1984
- The grave of XYZ – Mysterious bank robber's grave w/ "XYZ" initials. Fountain Hill Cemetery. Knock thrice.
- Mount Saint John – 135 Kirtland Street

== Events ==
Every year on the third Saturday in July, Deep River hosts the Deep River Ancient Muster, the largest one day gathering of fife and drum corps in the United States.

== Demographics ==
Historical population
Census	Pop.	Note	%±
1790	3,233		—
1800	3,363		4.0%
1810	3,996		18.8%
1820	4,165		4.2%
1830	5,018		20.5%
1840	3,417		−31.9%
1850	2,904		−15.0%
1860	1,213		−58.2%
1870	1,267		4.5%
1880	1,362		7.5%
1890	1,484		9.0%
1900	1,634		10.1%
1910	1,907		16.7%
1920	2,325		21.9%
1930	2,381		2.4%
1940	2,332		−2.1%
1950	2,570		10.2%
1960	2,968		15.5%
1970	3,690		24.3%
1980	3,994		8.2%
1990	4,332		8.5%
2000	4,610		6.4%
2010	4,629		0.4%
2020	4,415		−4.6%
U.S. Decennial Census

As of the census of 2000, there were 4,610 people, 1,824 households, and 1,262 families living in the town. The population density was 340.1 inhabitants per square mile (131.3/km^{2}). There were 1,910 housing units at an average density of 140.9 per square mile (54.4/km^{2}). The racial makeup of the town was 94.56% White, 2.41% African American, 0.04% Native American, 0.80% Asian, 0.07% Pacific Islander, 1.04% from other races, and 1.08% from two or more races. Hispanic or Latino of any race were 2.95% of the population.

There were 1,824 households, out of which 30.2% had children under the age of 18 living with them, 56.6% were married couples living together, 9.1% had a female householder with no husband present, and 30.8% were non-families. 24.0% of all households were made up of individuals, and 8.7% had someone living alone who was 65 years of age or older. The average household size was 2.46 and the average family size was 2.93.

The age distribution was 24.3% under the age of 18, 5.4% from 18 to 24, 30.6% from 25 to 44, 26.3% from 45 to 64, and 13.3% who were 65 years of age or older. The median age was 39 years. For every 100 females, there were 98.5 males. For every 100 females age 18 and over, there were 96.6 males.

The median income for a household in the town was $51,677, and the median income for a family was $62,260. Males had a median income of $46,268 versus $32,454 for females. The per capita income for the town was $32,604. About 3.9% of families and 5.1% of the population were below the poverty line, including 4.7% of those under age 18 and 7.8% of those age 65 or over.

=== CDP ===
As of the census of 2000, there were 2,470 people, 1,023 households, and 652 families living in the Deep River Center CDP. The population density was 943.2 inhabitants per square mile (364.2/km^{2}). There were 1,077 housing units at an average density of 411.3 per square mile (158.8/km^{2}). The racial makeup of the CDP was 92.19% White, 3.72% African American, 0.08% Native American, 0.61% Asian, 0.04% Pacific Islander, 1.94% from other races, and 1.42% from two or more races. Hispanic or Latino of any race were 3.81% of the population.

There were 1,023 households, out of which 26.7% had children under the age of 18 living with them, 50.0% were married couples living together, 10.6% had a female householder with no husband present, and 36.2% were non-families. 29.2% of all households were made up of individuals, and 9.8% had someone living alone who was 65 years of age or older. The average household size was 2.30 and the average family size was 2.84.

The distribution was 23.1% under the age of 18, 6.3% from 18 to 24, 31.6% from 25 to 44, 24.9% from 45 to 64, and 14.0% who were 65 years of age or older. The median age was 38 years. For every 100 females, there were 101.1 males. For every 100 females age 18 and over, there were 95.9 males.

The median income for a household in the CDP was $44,680, and the median income for a family was $51,685. Males had a median income of $42,958 versus $30,880 for females. The per capita income for the CDP was $27,261. About 3.9% of families and 5.5% of the population were below the poverty line, including 7.0% of those under age 18 and 3.5% of those age 65 or over.

== Government ==
Voter Registration and Party Enrollment as of October 25, 2005
Party	Active Voters	Inactive Voters	Total Voters	Percentage
Democratic	909	33	942	29.17%
Republican	651	31	682	21.12%
Unaffiliated	1,527	71	1,598	49.49%
Minor Parties	7	0	7	0.22%
Total	3,049	135	3,229	100%

Presidential Election Results
Year	Democratic	Republican	Third Parties
2020	61.5% 1,785	37.1% 1,076	1.4% 41
2016	54.2% 1,412	41.4% 1,077	4.4% 115
2012	60.8% 1,479	38.3% 932	0.9% 22
2008	63.0% 1,668	35.8% 946	1.2% 32
2004	59.4% 1,548	38.6% 1,007	2.0% 51
2000	56.6% 1,348	37.6% 896	5.8% 138
1996	51.8% 1,160	31.1% 696	17.1% 382
1992	39.7% 980	30.4% 752	29.9% 738
1988	47.6% 1,053	51.2% 1,133	1.2% 27
1984	35.1% 760	64.5% 1,397	0.4% 9
1980	34.8% 707	50.4% 1,024	14.8% 294
1976	45.6% 943	53.7% 1,111	0.7% 12
1972	36.7% 716	62.5% 1,218	0.8% 16
1968	48.4% 827	46.4% 792	5.2% 88
1964	66.7% 1,073	33.3% 535	0.00% 0
1960	49.7% 843	50.3% 852	0.00% 0
1956	38.5% 642	61.5% 1,025	0.00% 0

== Education ==
The towns of Deep River, Chester, and Essex make up Regional School District #4. Deep River is home to Deep River Elementary School, serving grades K–6. John Winthrop Middle School and Valley Regional High School, serve students for grades 7–8 and 9–12, and are located on Warsaw Street and Kelsey Hill Road, respectively. Additionally, the Connecticut Transition Academy at Mount Saint John which serves students for grades from elementary to high school which is located on Kirtland Street and across the river from Gillette Castle State Park, respectively.

== Transportation ==
The Estuary Transit District provides public transportation throughout Deep River and the surrounding towns through its 9 Town Transit Service. Services include connections to the Old Saybrook Train Station, served by Amtrak and Shoreline East railroads.

== Notable people ==
- Giles Bushnell Avery, Shaker writer
- John Leander Billard, coal merchant (born in Saybrook in 1842)
- Charles H. Clark, mayor of Rochester, New York
- Elizabeth Jarvis Colt, wife of firearms manufacturer Samuel Colt
- Benjamin Hyde Edgerton, surveyor and politician
- Brian Dayett, New York Yankees/Chicago Cubs Major League Baseball player
- Rodri, Manchester City and Spanish National Team professional footballer
- Mysterious Dave Mather, Wild West gunfighter
- Gretchen Mol, actress
- Alpheus S. Williams, lawyer, judge, journalist, U.S. Congressman, and Union general in the American Civil War
