= Higganum, Connecticut =

- Census-designated place
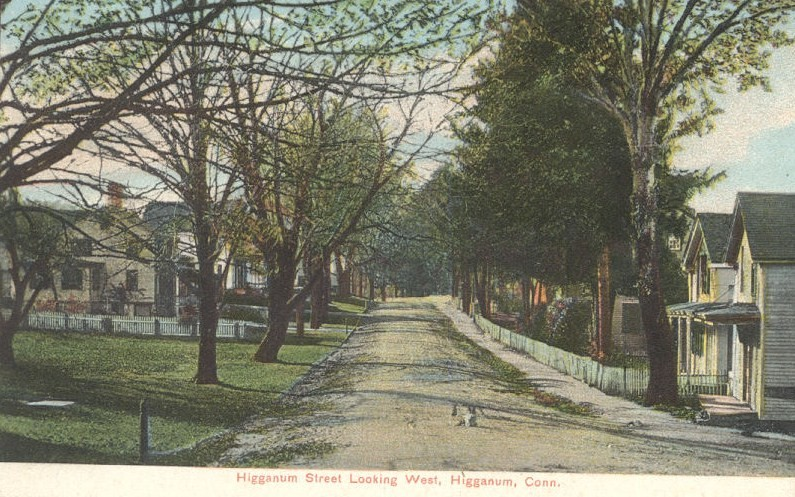
- View of a street in Higganum, from a postcard mailed in 1909

- Location within Connecticut Location within the United States
- Coordinates: 41°29′49″N 72°33′25″W
- Country: United States
- State: Connecticut
- County: Middlesex
- Town: Haddam

Area
  - Total: 6.52 sq mi (16.9 km^{2})
  - Land: 6.21 sq mi (16.1 km^{2})
  - Water: 0.31 sq mi (0.80 km^{2})
- Elevation: 61 ft (19 m)

Population (2020)
  - Total: 2,089
  - Density: 872/sq mi (336.7/km^{2})
- Time zone: UTC-5 (Eastern (EST))
  - Summer (DST): UTC-4 (EDT)
- ZIP Code: 06441
- Area codes: 860/959
- FIPS code: 09-38050
- GNIS feature ID: 2377826

Higganum is a village and census-designated place (CDP) in the town of Haddam, a part of Middlesex County, Connecticut, United States. The population was 2,089 at the 2020 census.

== History ==
The name "Higganum" is derived from an Indian name meaning either "at the tomahawk rock" or "Great Bend in River".

At about 1800, Higganum Center was the area of most economic activity in the town. The neighborhood had abundant water power, and Higganum Landing on the Connecticut River formed a natural cove that served as a river port and shipbuilding center from the late 1700s through the mid-1800s. Scovil Hoe Company, which made hoes that helped till soil for crops that included cotton and tobacco, once had a major factory based in Higganum. Higganum Landing Historic District has been listed on the National Register of Historic Places since 2018.

Higganum encompasses the town's traditional center and remains the shopping and civic center for Haddam. It has a center green with a veterans' memorial, Shad museum, a youth center and a gazebo.

== Geography ==
Higganum lies on the southwestern bank of the Connecticut River and is located immediately south of Middletown. Geographical landmarks include Candlewood Hill, Candlewood Brook, Seven Falls and Bible Rock. According to the United States Census Bureau, the Higganum CDP has a total area of 6.5 square miles (17 km^{2}), of which 6.2 square miles (16 km^{2}) are land and 0.3 square miles (0.8 km^{2}), or 4.77%, are water.

== Demographics ==
=== 2020 census ===
As of the 2020 census, Higganum had a population of 2,089. The median age was 47.5 years. 17.1% of residents were under the age of 18 and 21.3% of residents were 65 years of age or older. For every 100 females there were 100.1 males, and for every 100 females age 18 and over there were 97.4 males age 18 and over.

44.1% of residents lived in urban areas, while 55.9% lived in rural areas.

There were 887 households in Higganum, of which 27.2% had children under the age of 18 living in them. Of all households, 56.4% were married-couple households, 19.1% were households with a male householder and no spouse or partner present, and 18.4% were households with a female householder and no spouse or partner present. About 23.9% of all households were made up of individuals and 11.2% had someone living alone who was 65 years of age or older.

There were 953 housing units, of which 6.9% were vacant. The homeowner vacancy rate was 1.1% and the rental vacancy rate was 6.7%.

Racial composition as of the 2020 census
Race	Number	Percent
White	1,923	92.1%
Black or African American	10	0.5%
American Indian and Alaska Native	2	0.1%
Asian	31	1.5%
Native Hawaiian and Other Pacific Islander	0	0.0%
Some other race	23	1.1%
Two or more races	100	4.8%
Hispanic or Latino (of any race)	44	2.1%

=== 2000 census ===
As of the census of 2000, there were 1,671 people, 673 households, and 495 families living in the CDP. The population density was 132.5/km^{2} (343.4/mi^{2}). There were 698 housing units at an average density of 55.3/km^{2} (143.4/mi^{2}). The racial makeup of the CDP was 97.19% White, 1.08% African American, 0.12% Native American, 0.66% Asian, 0.12% from other races, and 0.84% from two or more races. Hispanic or Latino of any race were 0.96% of the population.

There were 673 households, out of which 30.6% had children under the age of 18 living with them, 62.4% were married couples living together, 8.0% had a female householder with no husband present, and 26.4% were non-families. 21.5% of all households were made up of individuals, and 9.1% had someone living alone who was 65 years of age or older. The average household size was 2.48 and the average family size was 2.89.

In the CDP the population was spread out, with 22.4% under the age of 18, 5.3% from 18 to 24, 31.1% from 25 to 44, 28.8% from 45 to 64, and 12.4% who were 65 years of age or older. The median age was 41 years. For every 100 females, there were 96.6 males. For every 100 females age 18 and over, there were 93.3 males.

The median income for a household in the CDP was $60,405, and the median income for a family was $80,998. Males had a median income of $48,125 versus $36,131 for females. The per capita income for the CDP was $31,238. About 1.5% of families and 3.9% of the population were below the poverty line, including 4.3% of those under age 18 and 9.6% of those age 65 or over.

== Education ==
Higganum is home to Haddam Killingworth High School (HKHS) and Burr District Elementary (BDES).
