= Gillette Castle State Park =

Park in Connecticut, United States of America

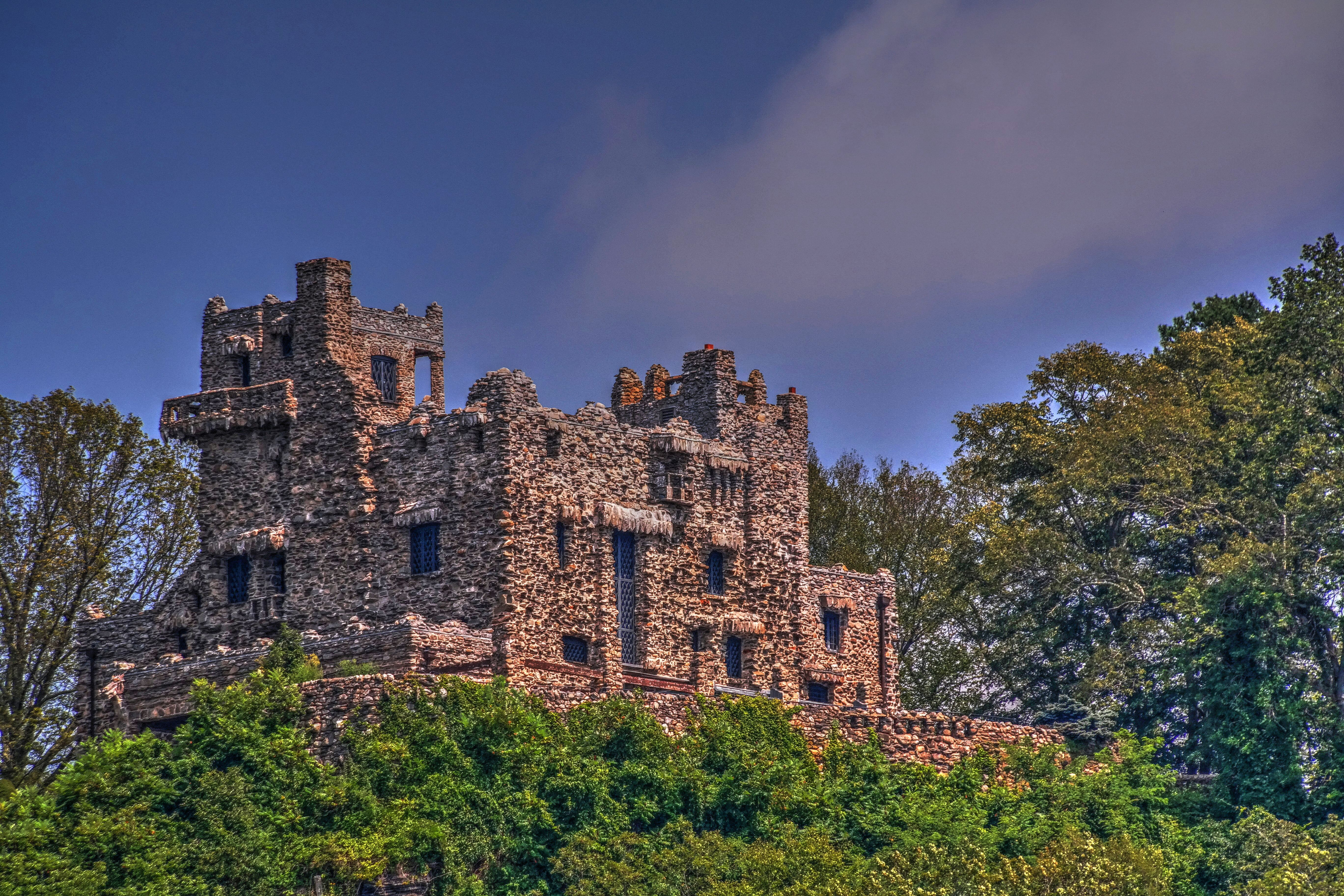

- Location within Connecticut Location within the United States
- Location: East Haddam and Lyme, Connecticut, United States
- Coordinates: 41°25′20″N 72°25′43″W
- Area: 184 acres (74 ha)
- Established: 1943
- Administrator: Connecticut Department of Energy and Environmental Protection
- Designation: Connecticut state park
- Website: Gillette Castle State Park
- Seventh Sister
- U.S. National Register of Historic Places
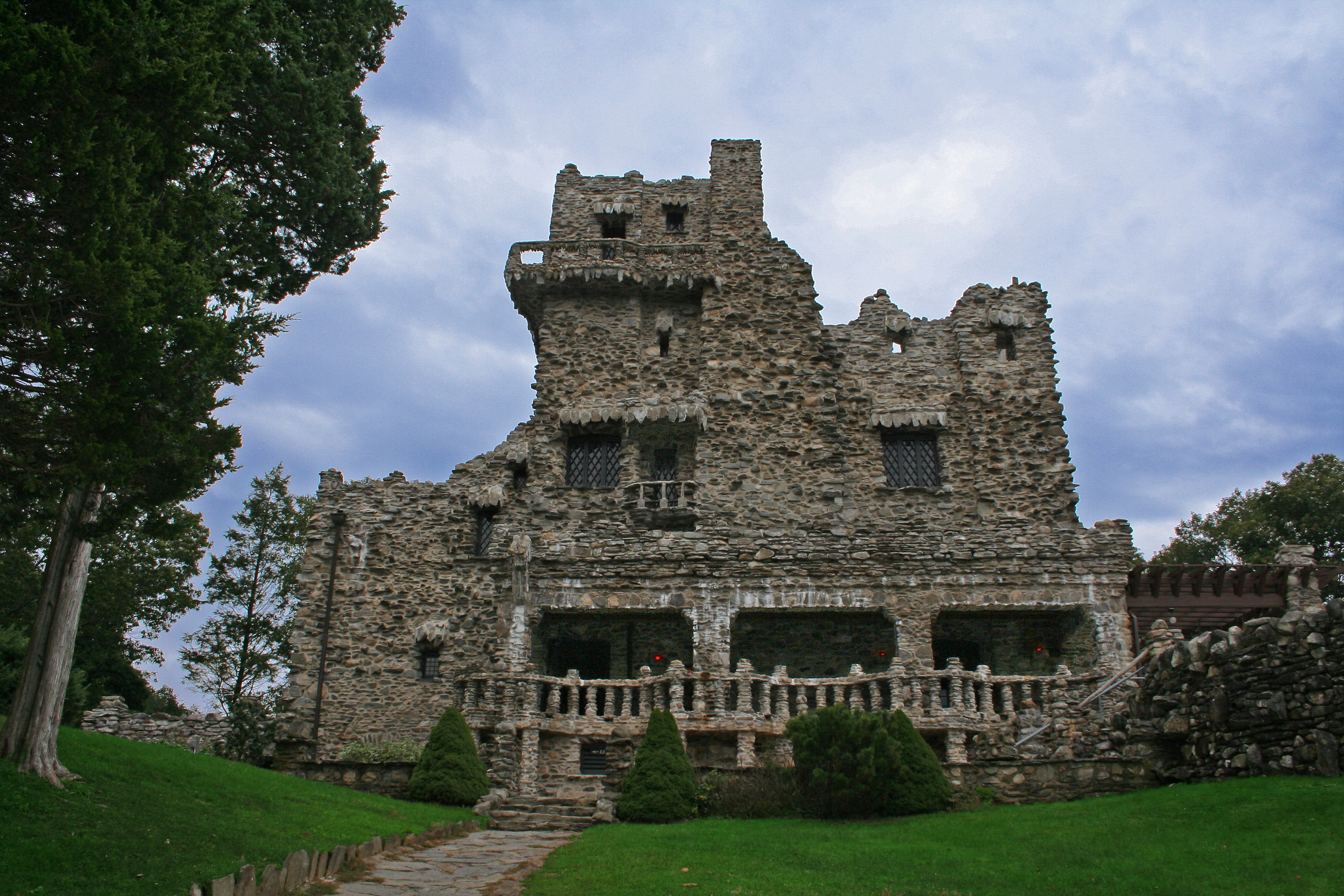
- Location: 67 River Road, East Haddam, Connecticut
- Area: 122 acres (49 ha)
- Built: 1914
- Architect: Gillette, William; Porteus-Walker Co.
- Architectural style: Bungalow/Craftsman, Gothic revival
- Website: Gillette Castle State Park
- NRHP reference No.: 86002103
- Added to NRHP: July 31, 1986

Gillette Castle State Park straddles the towns of East Haddam and Lyme, Connecticut in the United States, sitting high above the Connecticut River. The mansion was designed and built by William Gillette (1853–1937), an American actor most famous for his portrayal of Sherlock Holmes on stage. Gillette lived here from 1919 until his death in 1937. The State of Connecticut purchased the property in 1943 for $29,000.

== Location ==
The park is located at 67 River Road in East Haddam and consists of the mansion (located in Lyme) and its grounds. It receives 350,000 annual visitors. It reopened in 2002 after a four-year, $11 million restoration and includes a visitors' center and museum, hiking trails, and picnic area.

== History ==
William Gillette's "castle", called Seventh Sister and renamed "Gillette Castle" by the State of Connecticut in 1943, was built between 1914 and 1919 with an addition completed in 1924 on a 184-acre (74 ha) tract at the top of the southernmost of a chain of hills known as the Seven Sisters. Gillette died, leaving no wife or children, and his will precluded the possession of his home by any "blithering sap-head who has no conception of where he is or with what surrounded". The State of Connecticut took over the property in 1943, renaming it Gillette Castle State Park. It was added to the National Register of Historic Places in 1986.

Gillette originally planned to build his retirement home on Long Island until he discovered the cliffs of the Seven Sisters while traversing the Connecticut River in his houseboat, Aunt Polly.

Gillette designed the home and personally oversaw every phase of the construction. Construction was performed by the Porteus-Walker Company, a leading contracting and wood-working firm based in Hartford, Connecticut founded by Gillette's childhood friend, Robert Porteus. It has been described as being designed in a medieval gothic, or an "American fairy tale mixed with European flair" style, or as "a weird blending of Victorian and Arts and Crafts". In the past, it had even been described as "Gillette's Folly".

The 3-story-plus-tower, 24-room, 14,000 sq ft home was built of wood, cement, and local Connecticut field stone, supported by a steel framework. The exterior of the home is covered in field stone. Woodwork within the home is hand-hewn southern white oak. In some places, beams were set directly into the stones, anchored only by cement. The walls, in particular, were constructed similarly to a stage set, lacking two-by-four studs and mortar in critical places. It has been noted it was "a wonder the building didn't collapse" before the castle's multimillion-dollar restoration. Insulation included seaweed and paper. It took 20 workers five years, from 1914 to 1919, to complete the construction, which cost over $1 million at the time. During the years in which Gillette lived in it, he led and supervised local craftsmen in making thousands of refinements to the home.

The style of the home's interior reflects craftsman aesthetic popularized by Gustave Stickley. A number of oddities exist inside the home that were personally designed by Gillette and said to be examples of his "creative genius". These include:

- 47 unique doors and door locks throughout the castle. Each door is equipped with an external Steampunk-like latch intricately carved of wood. Trick locks made unlocking these doors a puzzle.
- Unique furnishings including built-in couches and a movable table on tracks.
- Light switches of carved wood.
- A grand upper-floor balcony running the length of the downstairs main room. The walls on the second floor are notably short. This architectural feature is theorized to have been used to enhance Gillette's stature, making him appear taller to guests looking up at him from below.
- A hand-carved bar, which opened with a secret latch.
- A series of mirrors above the great hall allowing him to view visitors from his bedroom. This design is thought to have helped Gillette spy on guests and make dramatic entrances.
- A fire suppression system complete with a water tower, integrated into the home's design, that fed a unique manual fire sprinkler on the second floor overlooking the living room.
- Secret doors, passageway, and room. A secret door near the staircase leading to the rest of the home allowed Gillette to swiftly, unexpectedly, and theatrically appear to welcome or startle his guests. The secret room is only accessible by a staircase revealed after pulling down a handle. The room is small, and contains a fireplace.
- A grand wooden staircase to the upper floors.

The home was notably decorated with a number of Tiffany lamps made of broken bottle fragments. It also had a heated bed. At one time, Gillette shared his home with up to 17 cats. For them, he designed finely crafted cat toys.

Gillette was particularly fond of his 3-mile-long narrow gauge railroad with an elaborate system of switches, trestles, bridges, turnouts, and a tunnel. Visitors, reportedly including Albert Einstein, Helen Hayes, and Charlie Chaplin, could ride the railroad around the estate and speed along the 100-foot-plus cliffs of the Connecticut River. The railroad was complete with a steam engine and an electric engine, and were later purchased by Lake Compounce in Bristol, Connecticut. The remaining tracks were pulled up and the roadbed converted into walking trails. The engines were donated to the park in 1992, and are now on display at the Visitors' Center on the grounds. Gillette's "Grand Central Station" train stop still remains along with a replica on its roof of a metal cat figure.

The grounds also contained a root cellar, walking paths with near-vertical steps, a two-story gable-ended vernacular dwelling for servants, a small period barn, stone-arch bridges, wooden trestles spanning up to 40 ft (12 m), and a fish pond.

== Gallery ==
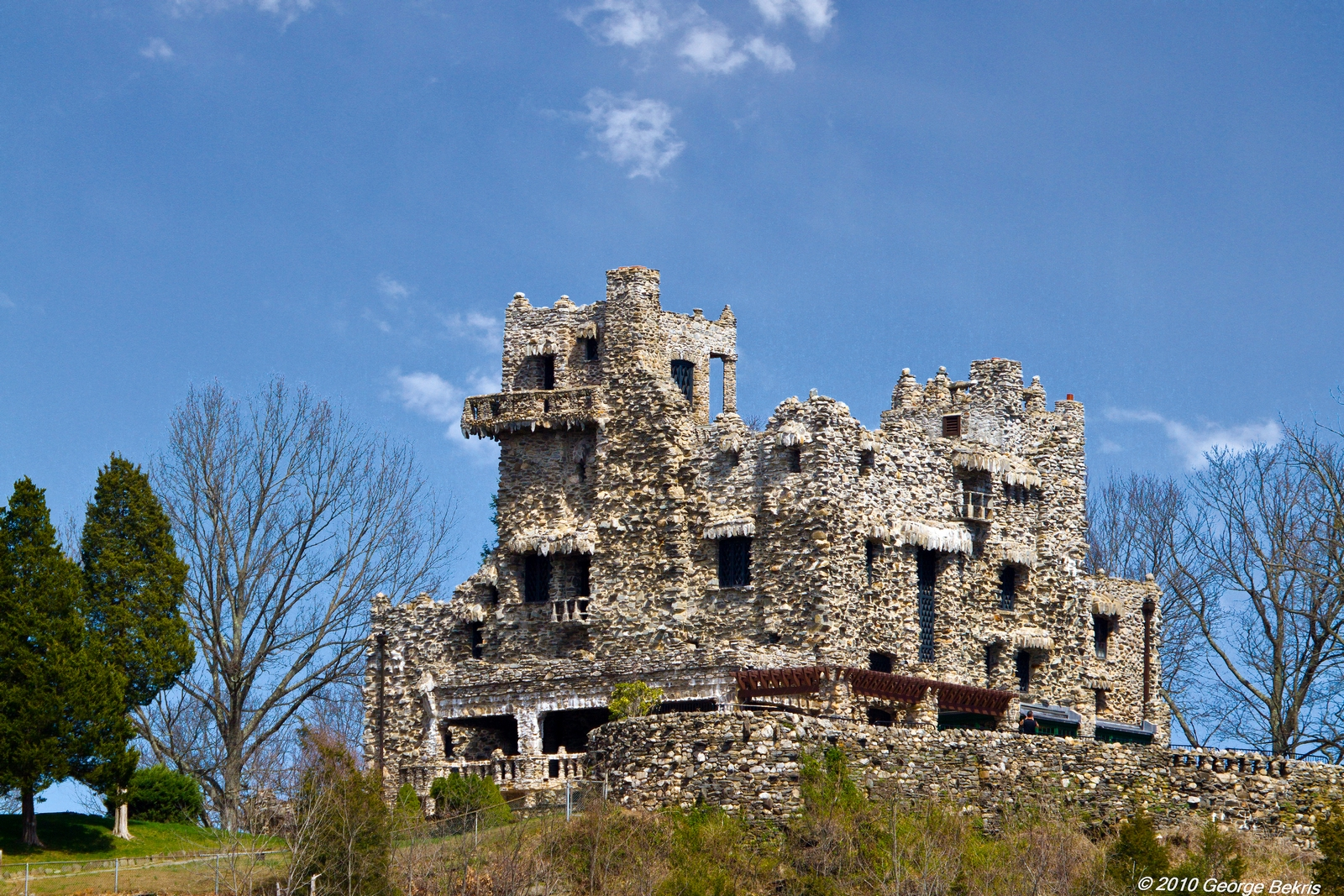
View from the Connecticut River

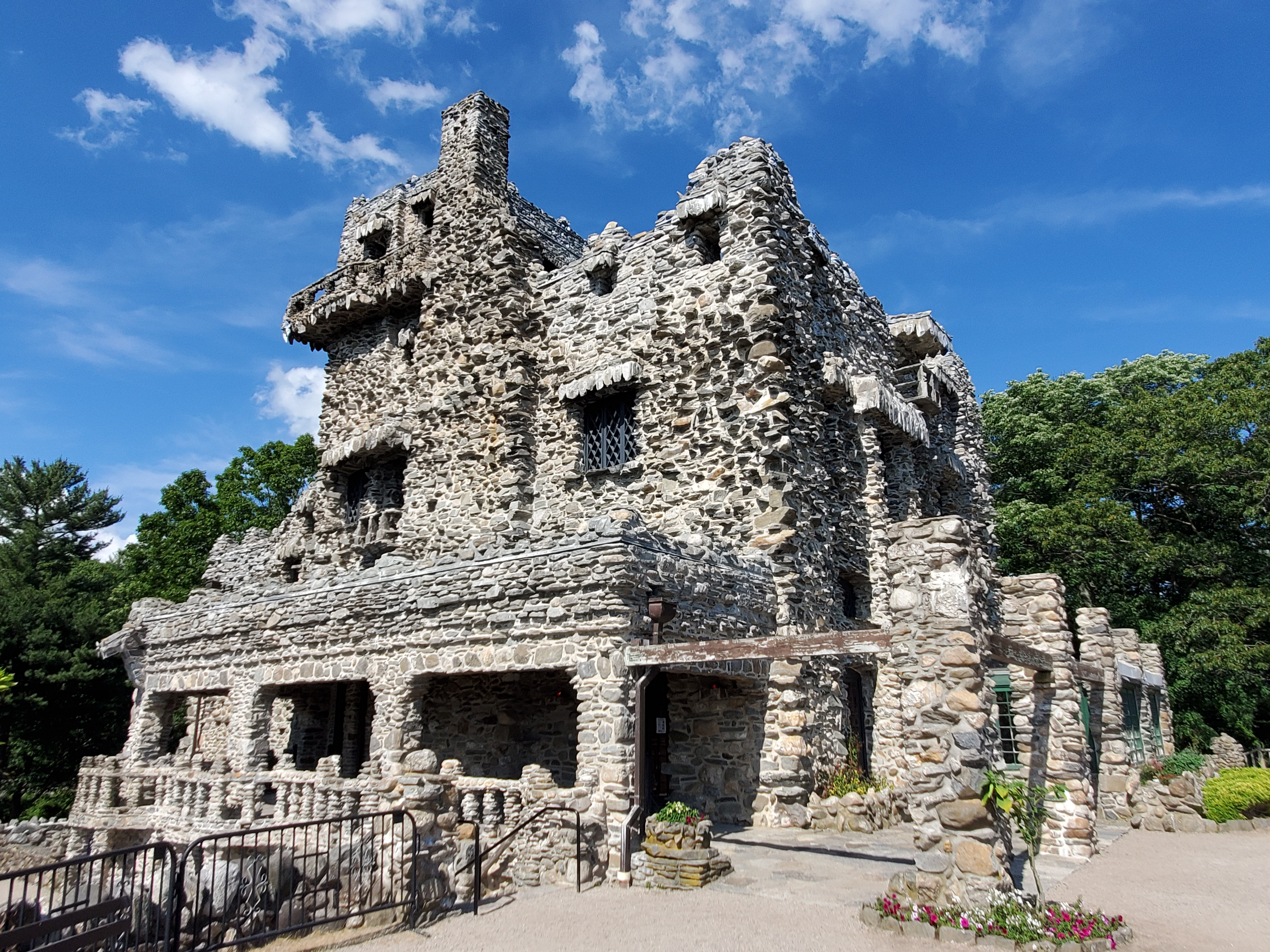
Gillete Caste from the Connecticut River overlook

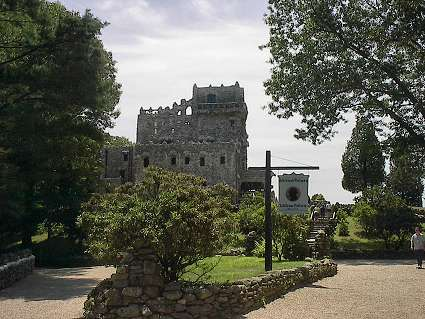
Side view of the castle

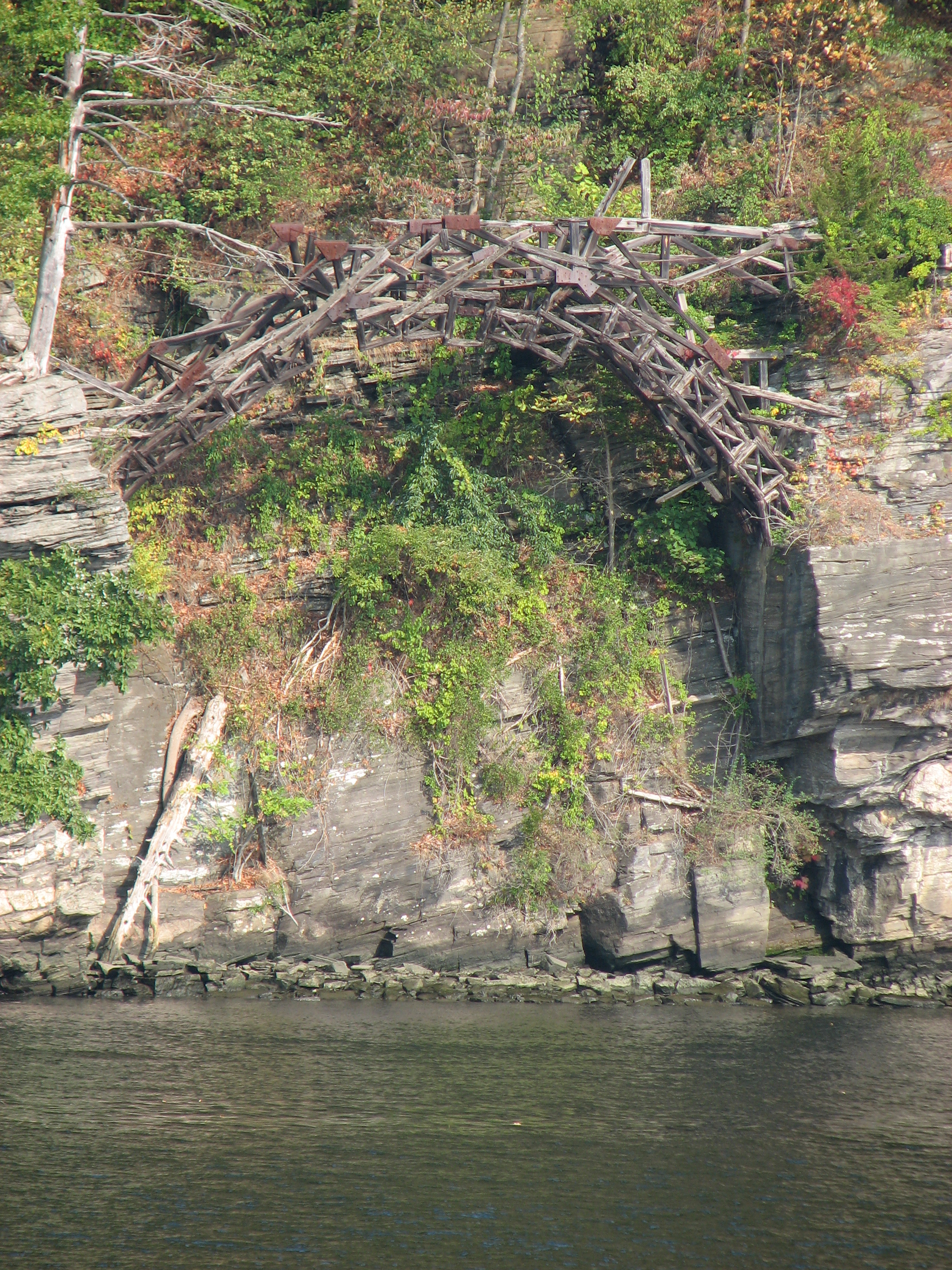
Ruins of wooden arch bridge designed by Gillette

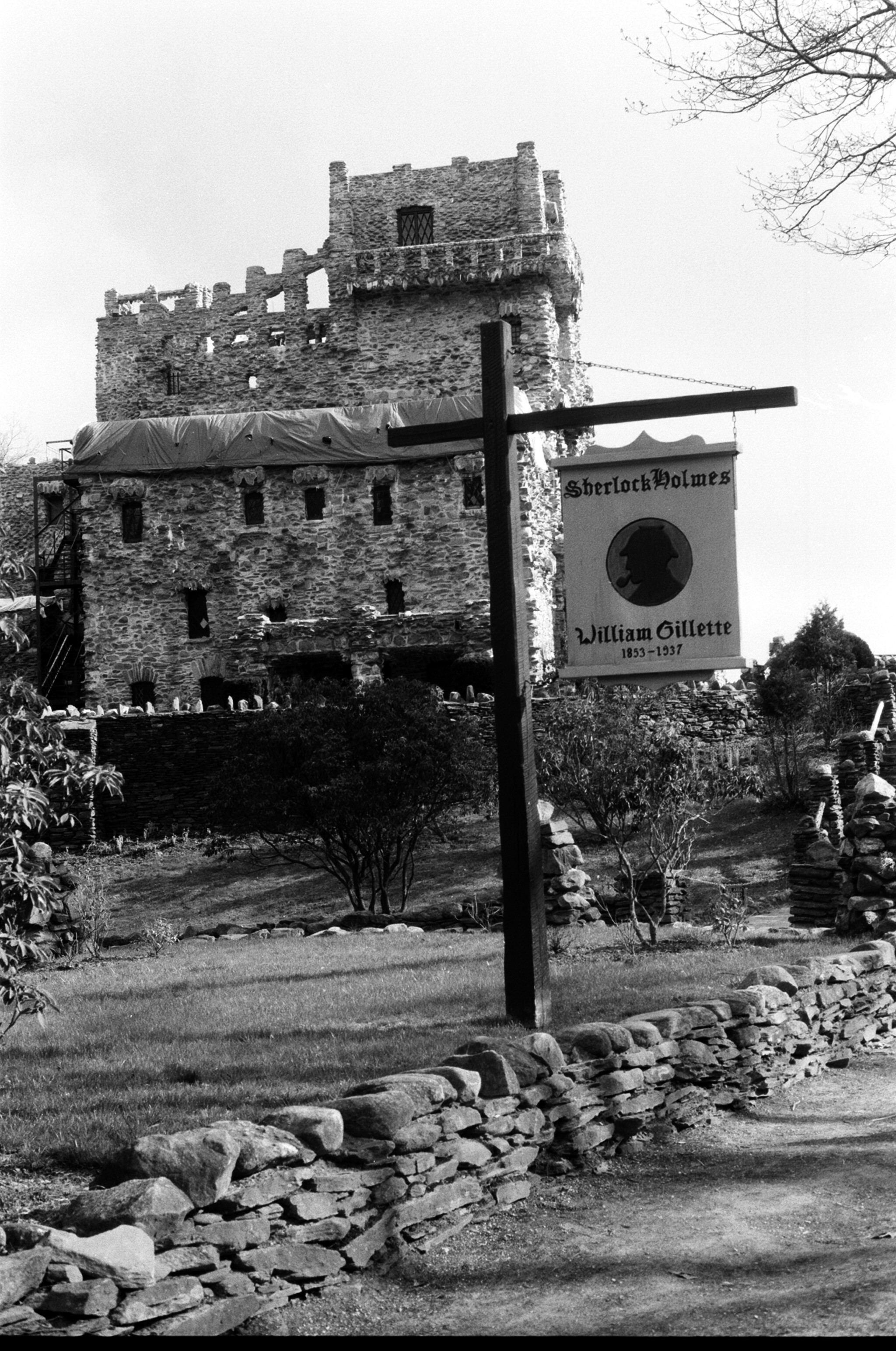

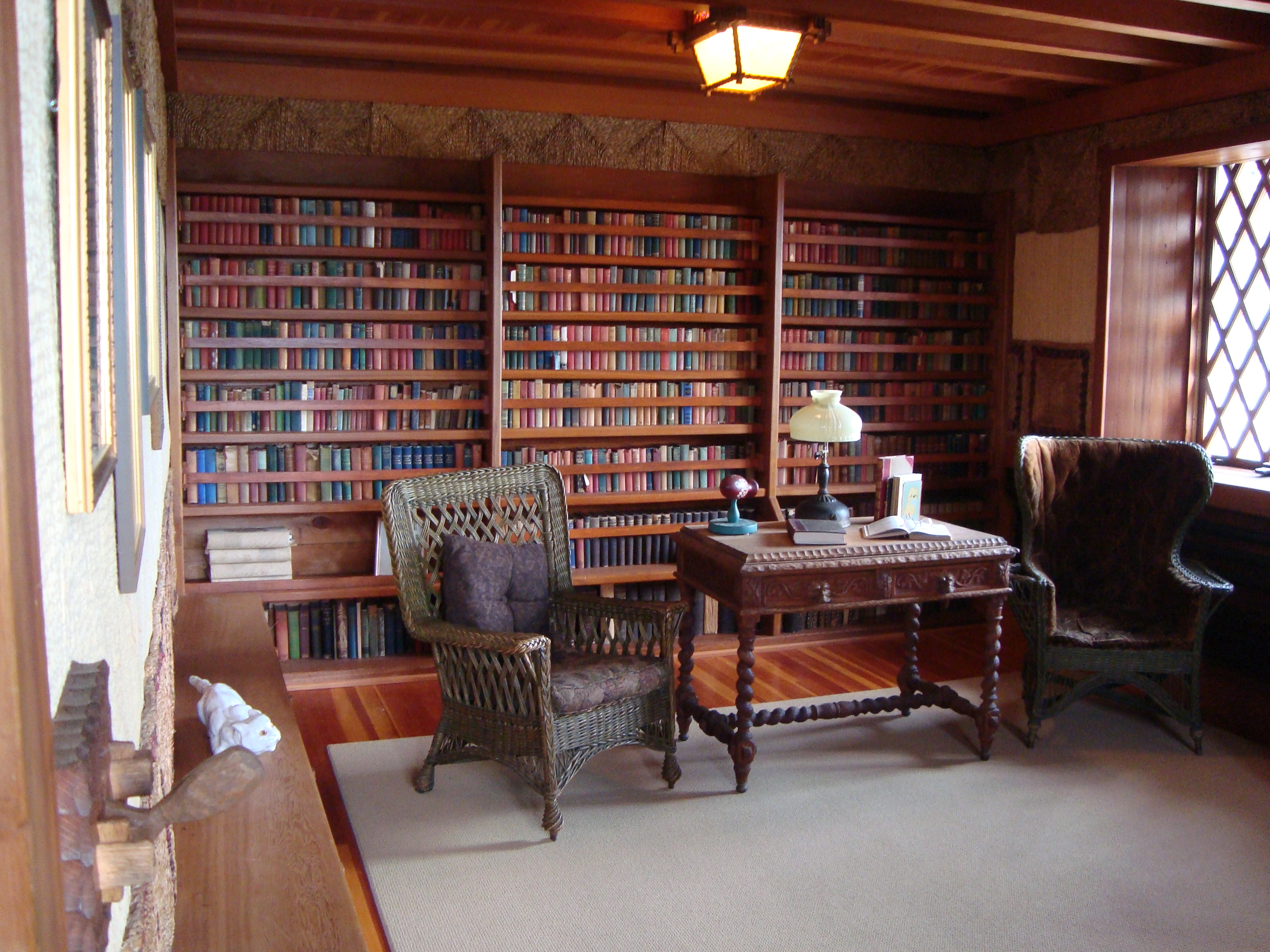
Library, interior of the castle

== See also ==
- National Register of Historic Places listings in New London County, Connecticut
- National Register of Historic Places listings in Middlesex County, Connecticut
