= Connecticut Route 166 =

State highway in Middlesex County, Connecticut, US

Route 166
- Spencer Plain Road
- Map of Middlesex County in southern Connecticut with Route 166 highlighted in red

Route information
- Maintained by CTDOT
- Length: 1.62 mi (2.61 km)
- Existed: 1935–present

Major junctions
- West end: Route 153 in Westbrook
- I-95 in Old Saybrook
- East end: US 1 in Old Saybrook

Location
- Country: United States
- State: Connecticut
- Counties: Middlesex

Highway system
- Connecticut State Highway System; Interstate; US; State; SSR; SR; Scenic
← Route 165	→ Route 167

Route 166 is a minor state highway in southern Connecticut running from Westbrook to Old Saybrook. The route primarily serves as a connector from I-95 to the Saybrook Manor section of Old Saybrook.

== Route description ==
Route 166 begins at an intersection with Route 153 in the eastern part of the town of Westbrook. It heads east, roughly paralleling I-95 on the north, into the town of Old Saybrook. Along the way, it passes by the Westbrook Block company just before crossing the town line. In Old Saybrook, it turns south, crossing I-95 along the Rosario Aloisio Memorial Bridge, with an interchange at exit 74. It continues southeast over the Amtrak Northeast Corridor line to end at an intersection with Route 1 in the western part of Old Saybrook. The entire route is known as Spencer Plain Road and is classified as a minor arterial road carrying average daily volumes of 5,600 vehicles per day.

== History ==
Route 166 was established from town roads in 1935, and has had no major changes in alignment or designation since.

== Junction list ==
The entire route is in Middlesex County.

Location	mi	km	Destinations	Notes
Westbrook	0.00	0.00	Route 153 – Westbrook, Essex, Deep River	Western terminus
Old Saybrook	1.29	2.08	I-95 – New Haven, New London	Exit 74 on I-95
Old Saybrook	1.62	2.61	US 1 – Downtown Old Saybrook, Westbrook	Eastern terminus
1.000 mi = 1.609 km; 1.000 km = 0.621 mi
