= Centerbrook Congregational Church =

Historic church in Connecticut, United States

- U.S. National Register of Historic Places
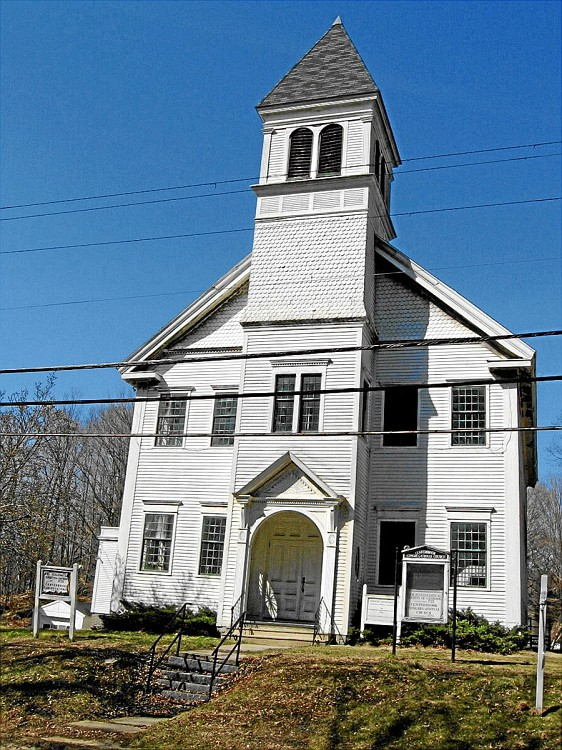

- Location within Connecticut Location within the United States
- Location: 51 Main Street, Essex, Connecticut
- Coordinates: 41°21′6″N 72°24′53″W
- Area: 1 acre (0.40 ha)
- Built: 1790
- Architect: Capt. John Dennison
- Architectural style: Greek Revival
- NRHP reference No.: 87000113
- Added to NRHP: February 12, 1987

The Centerbrook Congregational Church, also known as the Centerbrook Meeting House, is a historic church at 51 Main Street in the Centerbrook village of Essex, Connecticut. It is a single-story wood-frame structure resting on a granite foundation, which is set on a knoll on the north side of Connecticut Route 153. The main block was built in 1790, making it the oldest known church in Middlesex County and one of the oldest in the entire state. The building added to the National Register of Historic Places in 1987.

== Description and history ==
The Centerbrook Congregational Church is prominently located in the village center of Centerbrook, on the north side of Main Street (Connecticut Route 154) east of Deep River Road. It is a single-story frame structure, with a gabled roof and mostly clapboarded exterior. A square tower projects from its five-bay front facade, rising to a belfry stage with louvered round-arch openings and a pyramidal roof. Portions of the tower, and of the main gable are finished in decorative Victorian shingles. The building corners are pilastered, and windows are topped by projecting cornices.

The church was built in 1790, but has seen numerous alterations in its long history. Originally a plain rectangular structure, it was given Greek Revival features in an 1839 renovation, and the tower was added in 1889. The 1889 renovations also included a substantial remaking of the interior, which is now nearly entirely late Victorian in style. A two-story addition was added to the rear in 1972, adding space for a parish hall, Sunday school, and kitchen.

== See also ==
- National Register of Historic Places listings in Middlesex County, Connecticut
