= Benjamin Bushnell Farm =

Historic house in Connecticut, United States

- U.S. National Register of Historic Places
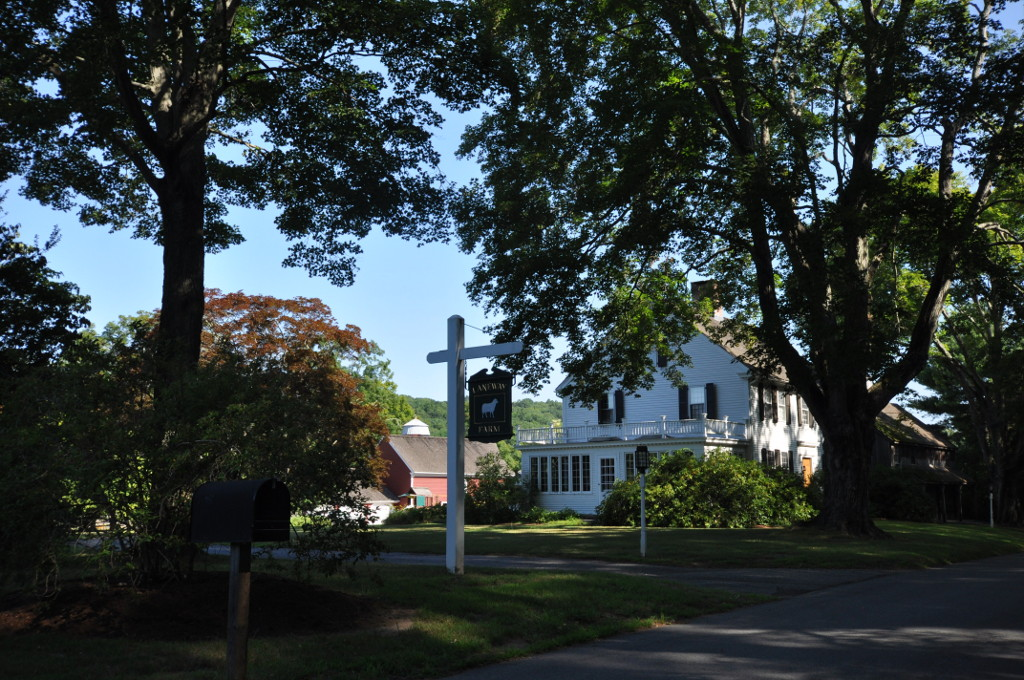

- Location within Connecticut Location within the United States
- Location: 52 Ingham Hill Road, Essex, Connecticut
- Coordinates: 41°19′49″N 72°25′14″W
- Area: 11 acres (4.5 ha)
- Built: c. 1790
- Architectural style: Colonial and Federal
- NRHP reference No.: 90000761
- Added to NRHP: May 10, 1990

The Benjamin Bushnell Farm is a historic farm property in Essex, Connecticut. Developed around 1790, the property includes a well-preserved Federal period farmhouse, and a rare example of a 19th-century cranberry house. The farm was listed on the National Register of Historic Places in 1990.

== Description and history ==
The Benjamin Bushnell Farm is located in a rural setting of southern Essex, on 11 acres (4.5 ha) between Ingham Hill Road and Connecticut Route 153. The property includes five buildings. The main house is a c. 1790 Federal style structure, five bays wide, with a central chimney. Its main entrance has a fine Federal surround, with delicate pilasters supporting a corniced entablature. The barn, with attached silo, is of 19th century origin, and the three remaining buildings are smaller, including a rare surviving cranberry house. The latter is evidence that the Bushnells and their successors actually cultivated cranberries, rather than just harvesting wild ones.

The property was owned from the late 17th century by the Bushnell family, settlers of Old Saybrook. The house was built by Benjamin Bushnell, and is a good example of a vernacular colonial style house, to which Federal details, likely inspired by the publications of Asher Benjamin, were applied. The property remained in the Bushnell family until 1879, when it was purchased by William Sisson. Sisson is credited with introducing the cultivation of cranberries to the area, using bogs on the property and damming two ponds to flood them on a seasonal basis.

== See also ==
- National Register of Historic Places listings in Middlesex County, Connecticut
