= Essex Freight Station =

- U.S. National Register of Historic Places
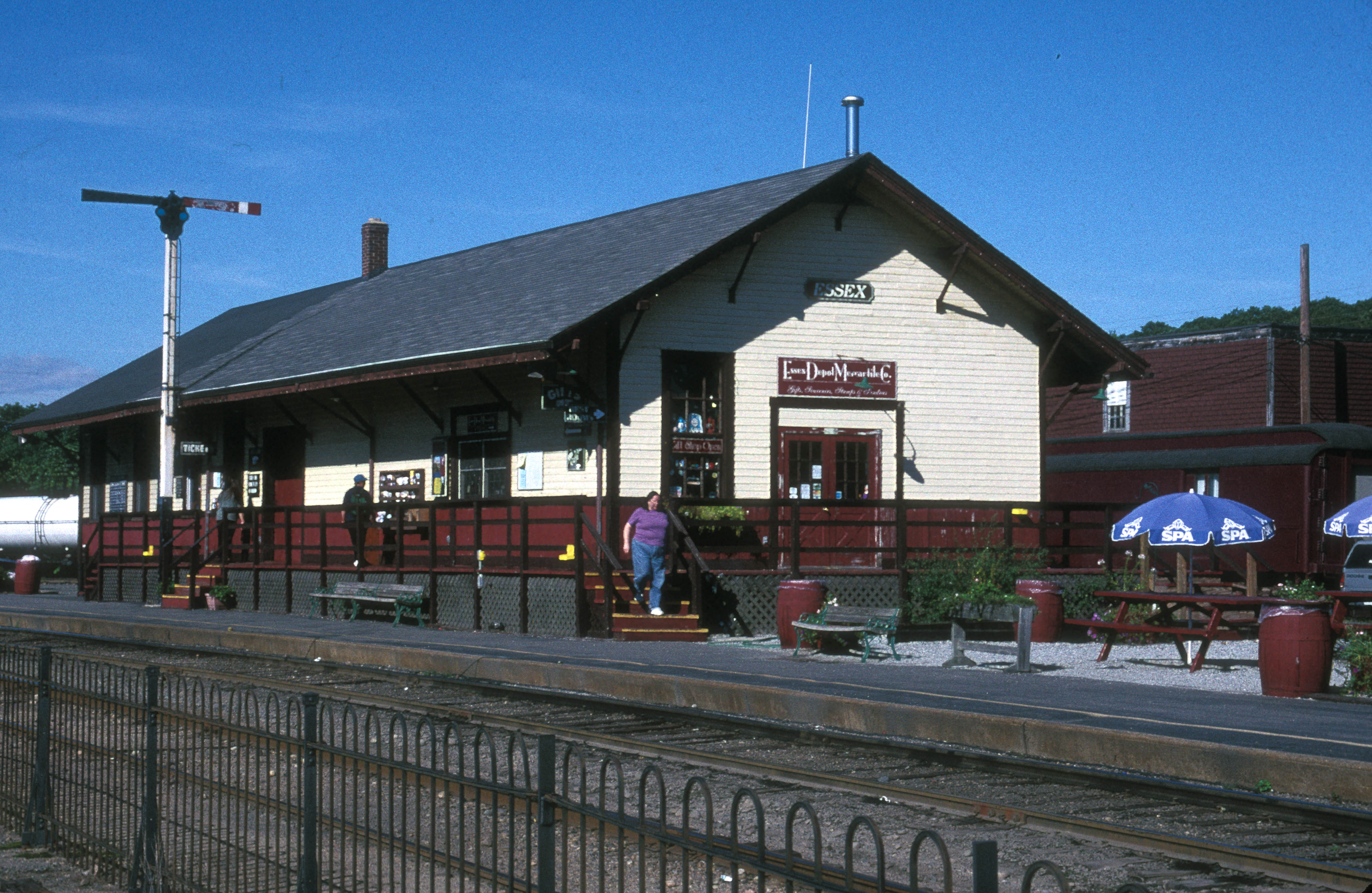
- Interactive map of Essex Freight Station
- Location: 1 Railroad Avenue, Centerbrook village, Essex, Connecticut
- Coordinates: 41°21′1″N 72°24′21″W
- Area: 2 acres (0.81 ha)
- Built: 1915
- NRHP reference No.: 94000337
- Added to NRHP: April 19, 1994

The Essex Freight Station is a railroad station located in the Centerbrook village of Essex, Connecticut. Built in 1915, it is a well-preserved example of period railroad-related architecture. It now serves as a station on the resurrected Connecticut Valley Railroad, which provides excursion steam train trips. The building was listed on the National Register of Historic Places on April 19, 1994.

== Description and history ==
The Essex Freight Station is located at the southern end of Railroad Avenue, a spur road off Connecticut Route 154 just west of the limited access highway of Connecticut Route 9. The setting includes the railyard, now used by the heritage Connecticut Valley Railroad, which includes operable early 20th-century equipment including switches and signals. The station is located on the west side of the railyard. It is a single-story wood-frame structure, with a low-pitch roof that has wide eaves supported by large brackets. Its walls are finished in vertical board siding on the lower part, and clapboards on the upper.

The station was built in 1915 by the New York, New Haven and Hartford Railroad along the former Connecticut Valley Railroad line, which had been serving the Connecticut River valley since 1871. The line saw passenger service along at least part of its line until 1933, and freight service until 1961, when the NYNH&H went bankrupt. A passenger station of similar appearance was originally located nearby, but was demolished. The station and yard were acquired in 1970 by the heritage Connecticut Valley Railroad, a nonprofit organization of railroad aficionados, which has been operating steam-powered excursion trains on portions of the CVR line since 1971.

== See also ==
- National Register of Historic Places listings in Middlesex County, Connecticut

Preceding station	New York, New Haven and Hartford Railroad	Following station
Deep River toward Hartford	Valley Branch	Old Saybrook Terminus
