= Essex Historic District =

Coordinates: 41.353°N 72.391°W

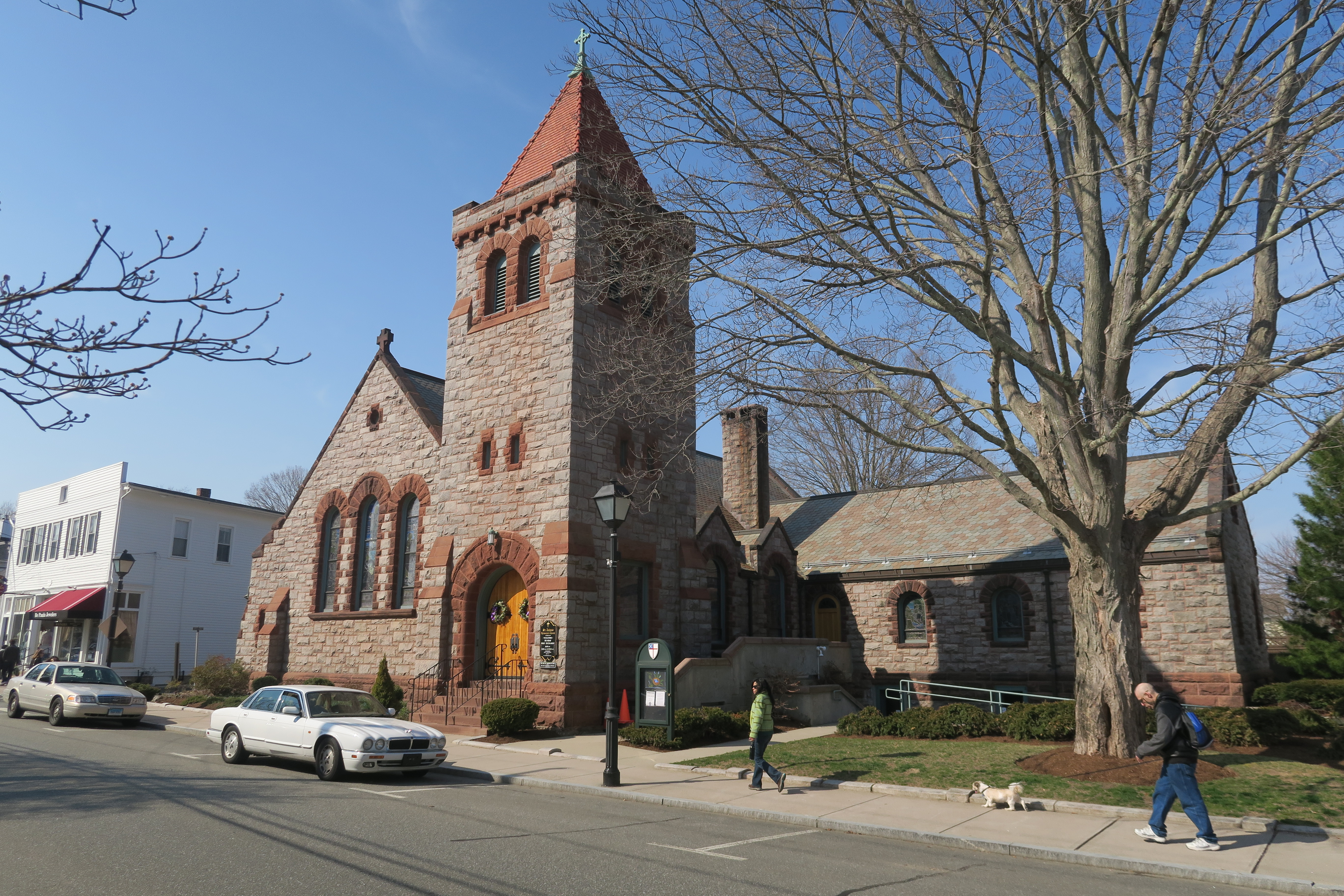
St. John's Episcopal Church

Essex Historic District was a proposed district, nominated for listing on the National Register of Historic Places in 1978. It would have included parts of Main, N. Main, S. Main, and W. Main Sts., in Essex, Connecticut.

The NRIS database recorded, on June 21, 1978, with reference number 78003525, that the district received listing status of DR, which means "Date Received/Pending Nomination". There apparently was no further National Register action, and the district was not listed.

Multiple internet webpages assert that Essex Historic District exists and/or was listed on the National Register, but those webpages appear to be incorrect. They apparently reflect incorrect interpretation of the National Register's NRIS database.
