= Lower Connecticut River Valley Planning Region, Connecticut =

Lower Connecticut River Valley Council of Governments (RiverCOG)
- Planning region
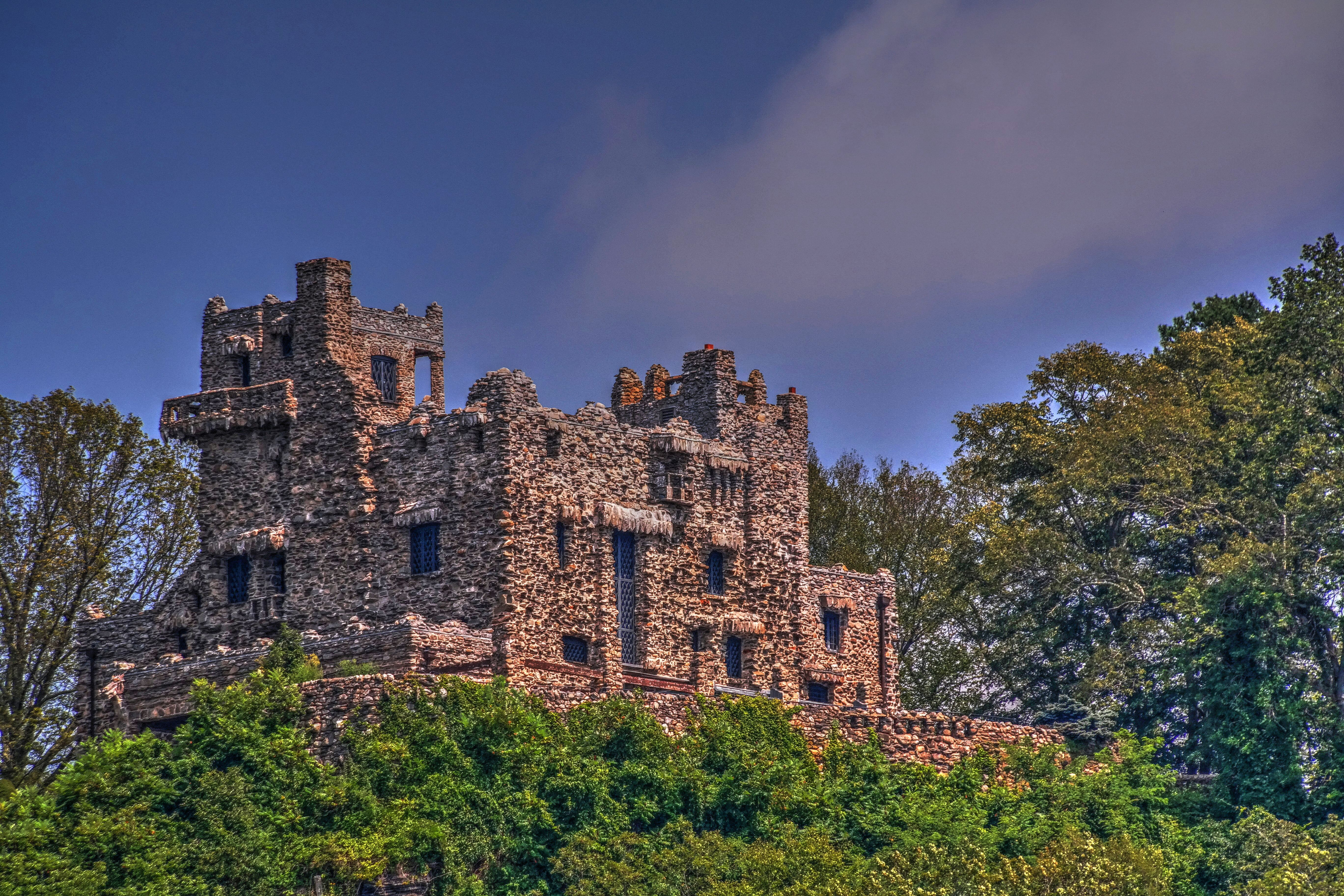
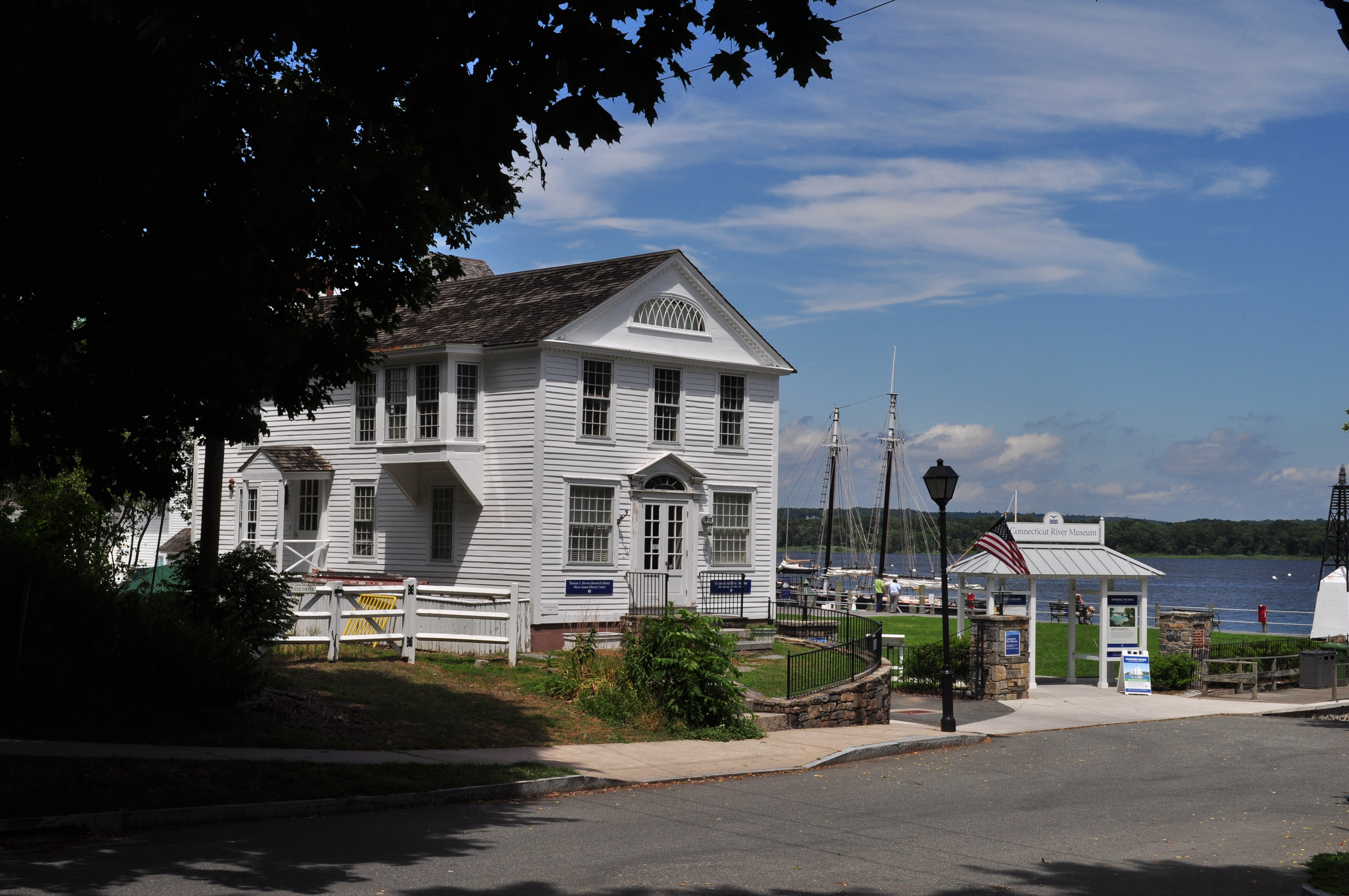
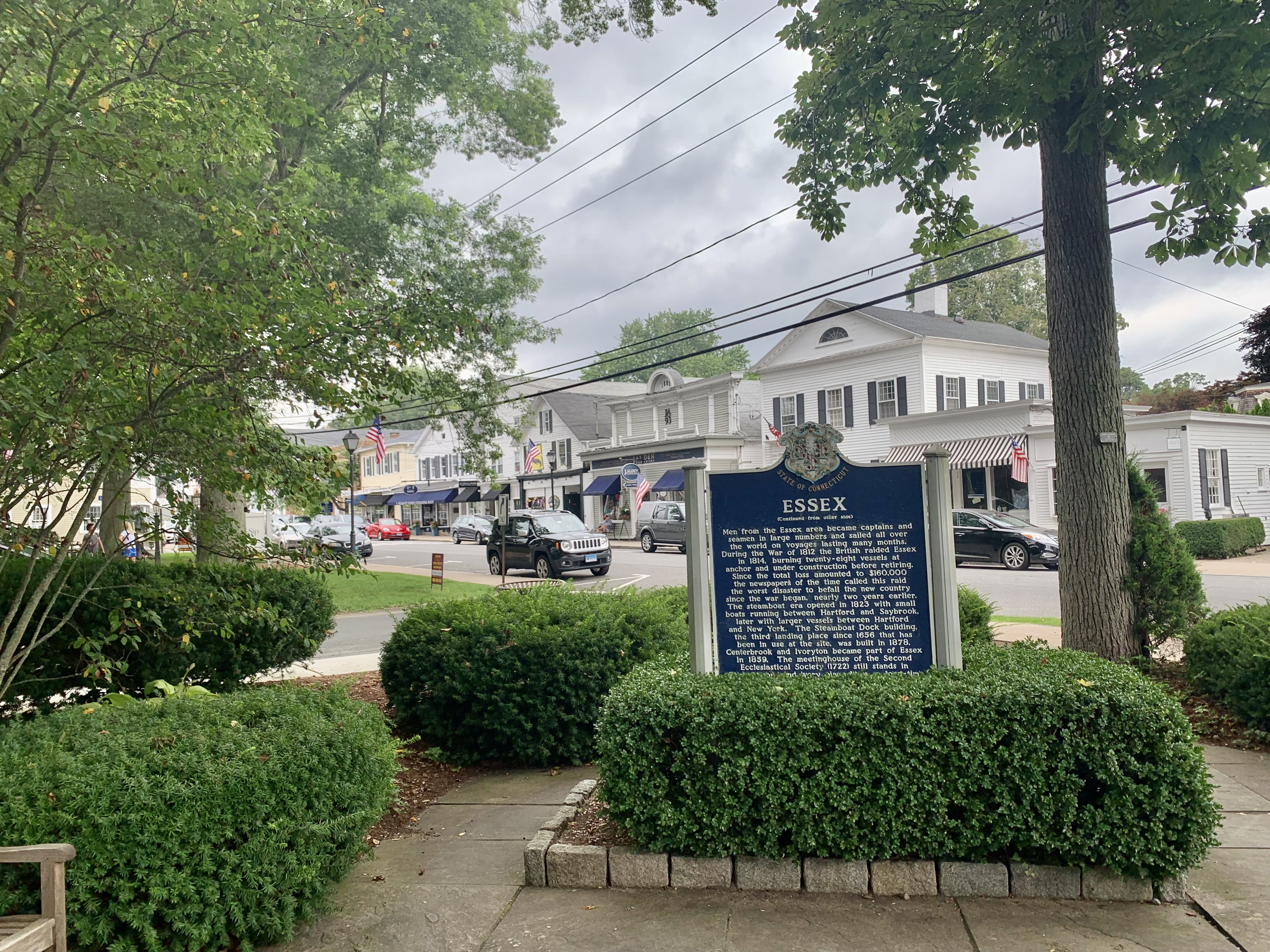
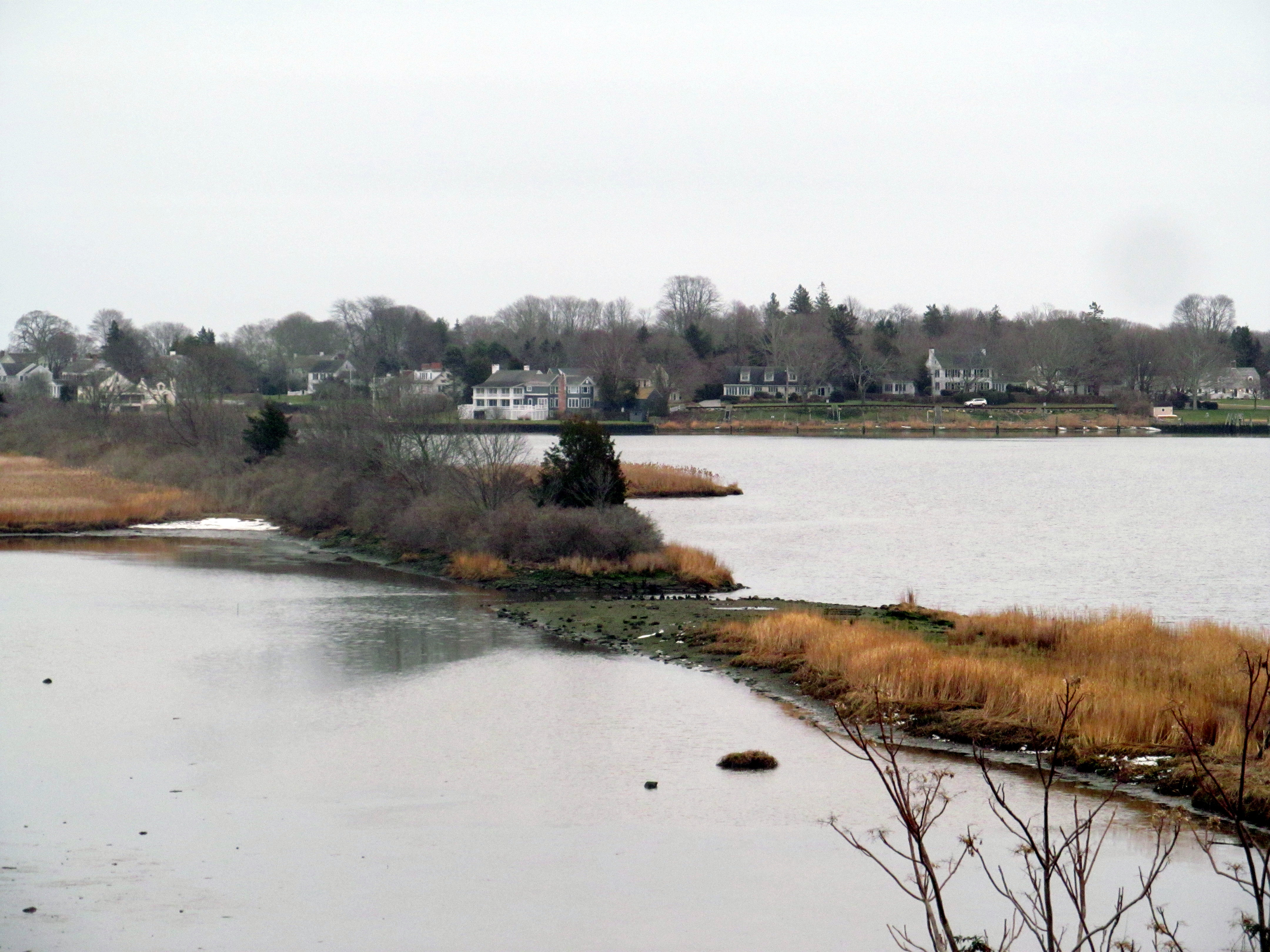
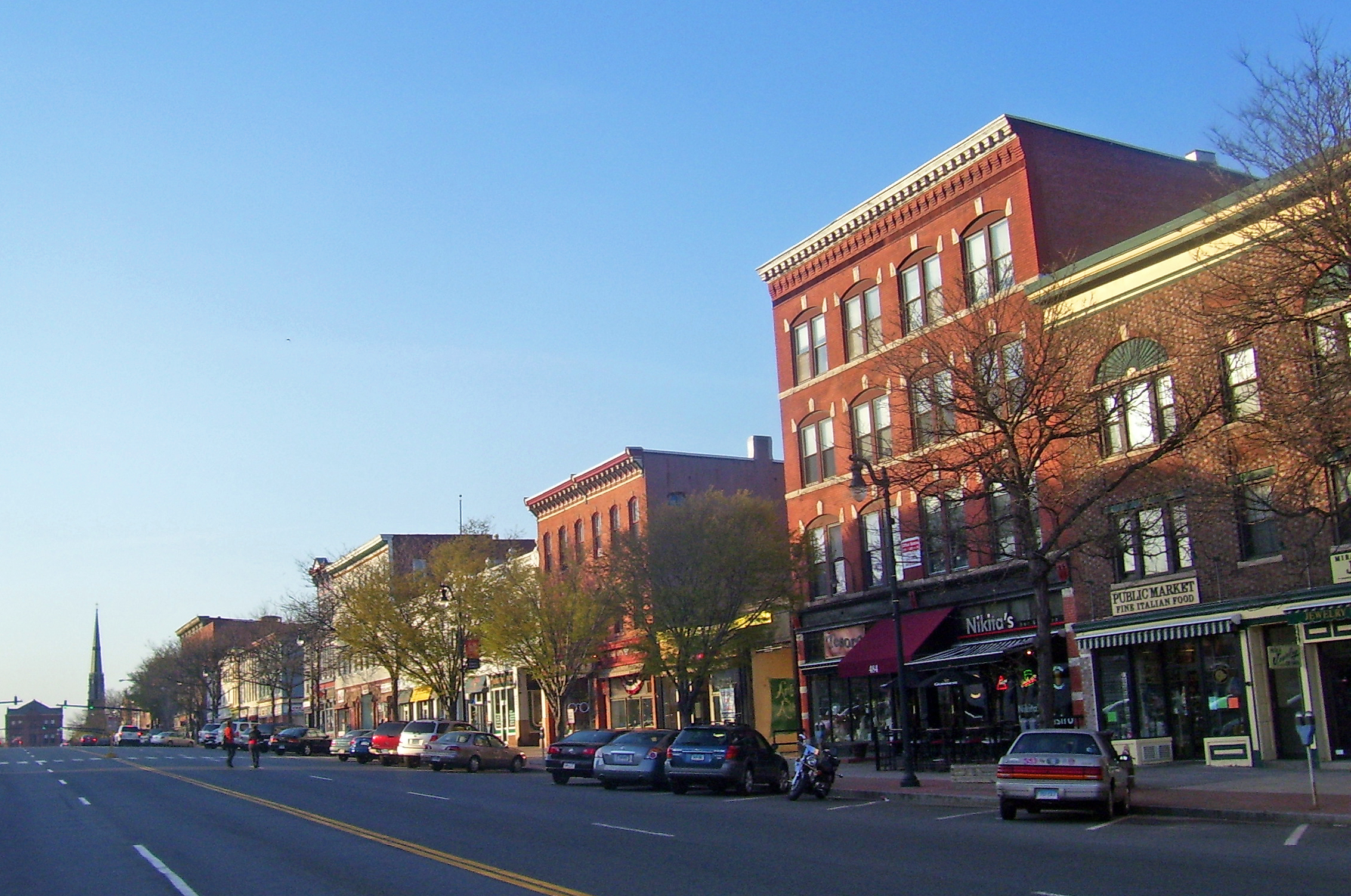
- From top left: Gillette Castle State Park, Connecticut River Museum, Essex Village, North Cove in Old Saybrook, Main Street Historic District in Middletown

- Logo

- Location within the U.S. state of Connecticut
- Interactive map of Lower Connecticut River Valley Council of Governments (RiverCOG)
- Coordinates: 41°28′N 72°31′W
- Country: United States
- State: Connecticut
- Founded: 2013
- Largest city: Middletown

Government
  - Executive Director: Samuel S. Gold

Area
  - Total: 424.1 sq mi (1,098 km^{2})

Population (2020)
  - Total: 174,225
  - Estimate (2025): 177,311 ▲
  - Density: 410.8/sq mi (158.6/km^{2})
- Time zone: UTC−5 (Eastern)
  - Summer (DST): UTC−4 (EDT)
- Congressional districts: 1st, 2nd, 3rd
- Website: rivercog.org

The Lower Connecticut River Valley Planning Region is a planning region and county-equivalent in the U.S. state of Connecticut. It is served by the coterminous Lower Connecticut River Valley Council of Governments (RiverCOG). In 2022, planning regions were approved to replace Connecticut's counties as county-equivalents for statistical purposes, with full implementation occurring by 2024.

== Demographics ==
Historical population
Census	Pop.	Note	%±
1790	14,642		—
1800	14,846		1.4%
1810	17,355		16.9%
1820	22,613		30.3%
1830	24,678		9.1%
1840	24,315		−1.5%
1850	25,654		5.5%
1860	28,354		10.5%
1870	34,439		21.5%
1880	33,095		−3.9%
1890	35,628		7.7%
1900	35,793		0.5%
1910	38,666		8.0%
1920	40,679		5.2%
1930	53,247		30.9%
1940	59,117		11.0%
1950	70,330		19.0%
1960	93,116		32.4%
1970	121,466		30.4%
1980	136,998		12.8%
1990	151,680		10.7%
2000	164,493		8.4%
2010	175,685		6.8%
2020	174,225		−0.8%
2025 (est.)	177,311	▲	1.8%
U.S. Decennial Census

As of the 2020 United States census, there were 174,225 people living in the Lower Connecticut River Valley Planning Region.

== Municipalities ==
The following municipalities are members of the Lower Connecticut River Valley Region:

=== City ===
- Middletown

=== Towns ===
- Chester
- Clinton
- Cromwell
- Deep River
- Durham
- East Haddam
- East Hampton
- Essex
- Haddam
- Killingworth
- Lyme
- Middlefield
- Old Lyme
- Old Saybrook
- Portland
- Westbrook

== facts ==
Lower Connecticut River Valley Planning Region, Connecticut is the longest county equivalent name standing at 42 letters (46 if including spaces) and without the "Planning Region" it's 27 leters (30 if counting spaces)
