= Connecticut Route 153 =

State highway in Middlesex County, Connecticut, US

Route 153
- Map of Middlesex County in southern Connecticut with Route 153 highlighted in red

Route information
- Maintained by CTDOT
- Length: 5.27 mi (8.48 km)
- Existed: 1932–present

Major junctions
- South end: US 1 in Westbrook
- I-95 in Westbrook
- North end: Route 9 / Route 154 in Essex

Location
- Country: United States
- State: Connecticut
- Counties: Middlesex

Highway system
- Connecticut State Highway System; Interstate; US; State; SSR; SR; Scenic
← Route 152	→ Route 154

Route 153 is a Connecticut state highway in the Connecticut River valley running from U.S. Route 1 (US 1) in Westbrook center to Route 9 in Essex Village in the town of Essex.

== Route description ==
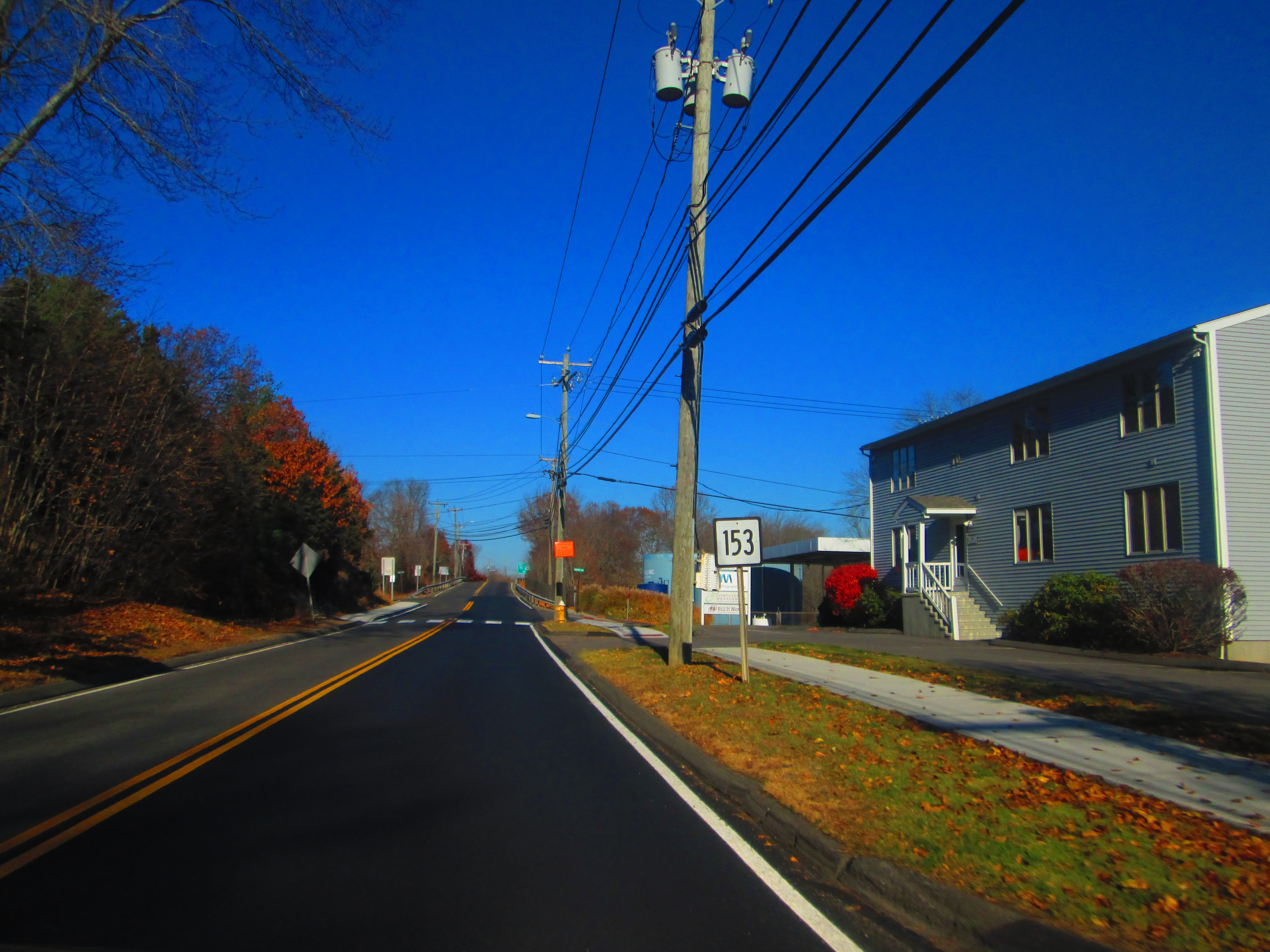
Route 153 in Westbrook

Route 153 begins as Essex Road in Downtown Westbrook, at an intersection with US 1. It heads north, passing by the Westbrook railroad station and the access road to the Tanger Outlet Mall, before intersecting with Interstate 95 (I-95) at exit 73 about half a mile north of US 1. Route 153 continues northeast through the eastern part of the town of Westbrook for another 3.5 miles (5.6 km) before entering the town of Essex. In Essex, the road becomes Westbrook Road, traveling through southwestern Essex for about 1.3 miles (2.1 km), at which point the road splits into two. Route 153 continues northeast towards Essex Village along Plains Road; Westbrook Road continues north as an unsigned state highway (designated as State Road 604) towards the village of Centerbrook. Route 153 intersects with Route 9 (at exit 3) about 0.9 miles (1.4 km) beyond the split and soon ends at an intersection with Route 154 just each of the interchange.

== History ==
The Westbrook to Centerbrook route was designated as a secondary state highway in the 1920s and was known as Highway 332. Route 153 was established as a renumbering of old Highway 332 in the 1932 state highway renumbering. When first created, the northern end of Route 153 ran along Westbrook Road like the old highway. In January 1967, the northern end was rerouted to its current location to accommodate an interchange with the Route 9 freeway.

== Junction list ==
The entire route is in Middlesex County.

Location	mi	km	Destinations	Notes
Westbrook	0.00	0.00	US 1 – Clinton, Old Saybrook	Southern terminus
Westbrook	0.51	0.82	I-95 – New London, New Haven	Exit 73 on I-95
Westbrook	0.88	1.42	Route 166 east – Old Saybrook	Western terminus of Route 166
Essex	4.33	6.97	Westbrook Road (SR 604 north)	
Essex	5.23	8.42	Route 9 south / Route 154 north – Old Saybrook, Centerbrook	Access to Route 154 via SR 621; exit 3 on Route 9 north
Essex	5.27	8.48	Route 9 north / Route 154 – Centerbrook, Old Saybrook, Middletown	Northern terminus; exit 3 on Route 9 south
1.000 mi = 1.609 km; 1.000 km = 0.621 mi
