= United Bank (West Virginia) =

Bank holding company based in West Virginia

Coordinates: 38.351192°N 81.637963°W

United Bankshares, Inc.
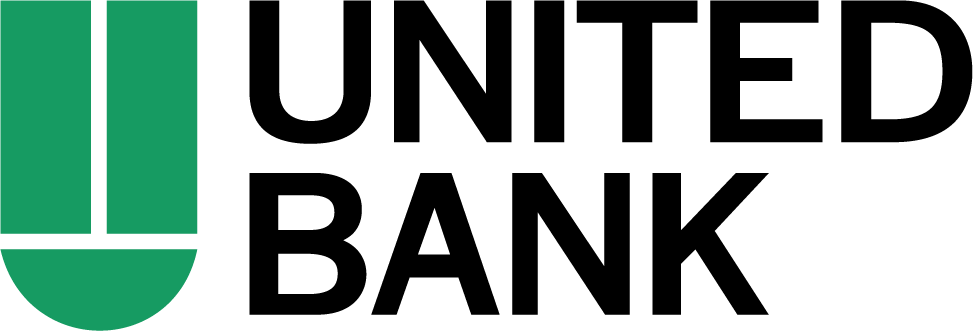
- Trade name: United Bank
- Type: Public
- Traded as: Nasdaq: UBSI; S&P 400 component
- Industry: Banking
- Founded: March 17, 1839; 187 years ago, in Parkersburg, Virginia (now West Virginia)
- Headquarters: Charleston, West Virginia, United States; Fairfax, Virginia, United States
- Area served: West Virginia; Virginia; District of Columbia; Maryland; Ohio; Pennsylvania; North Carolina; South Carolina; Georgia
- Key people: Richard M. Adams (chairman); Richard M. Adams, Jr. (CEO); W. Mark Tatterson (CFO)
- Net income: ▲$289 million (2020)
- Total assets: ▲$26.184 billion (2020)
- Total equity: ▲$4.297 billion (2020)
- Number of employees: Over 3,000 (2022)
- Website: ubsi-inc.com www.bankwithunited.com

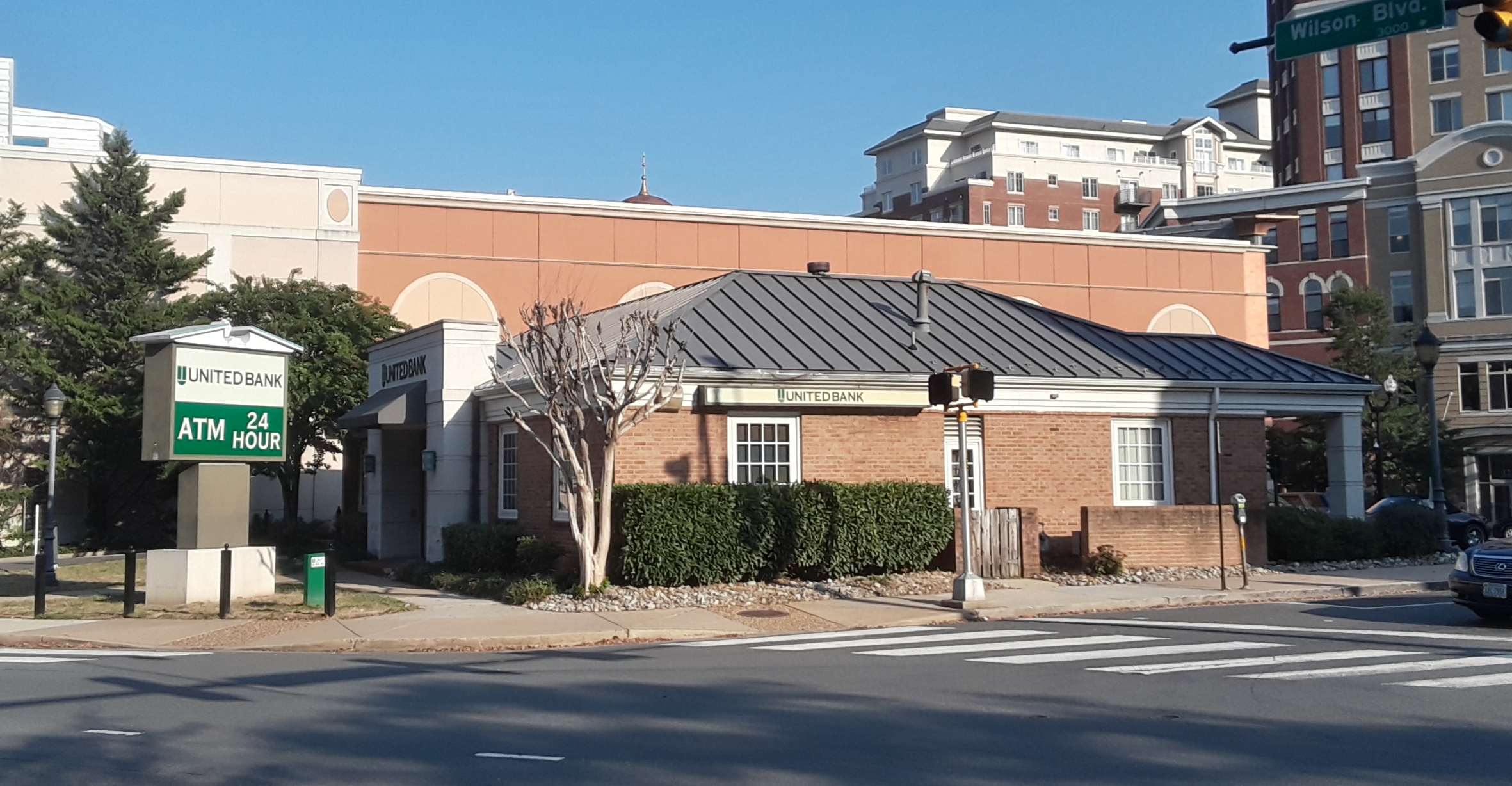
A United Bank branch in Clarendon, Arlington, Virginia

United Bankshares, Inc. is a bank holding company dual-headquartered in Charleston, West Virginia and Fairfax, Virginia with operations in West Virginia, Virginia, the District of Columbia, Maryland, Ohio, Pennsylvania, North Carolina, South Carolina, and Georgia in the United States. United Bankshares is the parent company of United Bank which comprises nearly 250 offices in eight states. In addition, UBSI is the parent company to subsidiaries George Mason Mortgage, United Brokerage, and Crescent Mortgage.

Based on total deposits, United Bank is the largest bank headquartered in West Virginia and the second largest bank operating in West Virginia, after Truist Financial. It is the eighth largest bank operating in Virginia and the tenth largest bank operating in the District of Columbia.

== History ==
The company traces its roots to St. Patrick's Day 1839, when Northwestern Bank of Virginia opened an office in Parkersburg (now in West Virginia). On St. Patrick's Day, some branches celebrate the bank's birthday by giving shamrocks to customers. That office eventually evolved into Parkersburg National Bank.

Richard Adams was named chairman and CEO of Parkersburg National Bank in 1975. In 1982, Parkersburg National began reorganizing as a holding company, United Bankshares. In 1984, United commenced full operations when it acquired Parkersburg National and two other banks. In 1987, the company became a public company via an initial public offering.

Under Adams's tenure, United completed 33 acquisitions. In 2022, American Banker named Richard Adams the "longest-serving CEO among the top 100 U.S. banks" after 47 years. Richard "Rick" Adams, Jr., who has served as United's president since 2014, became CEO in April 2022.

=== Acquisitions ===
The company has made the following acquisitions:

#	Date Completed	Company	Price	Ref(s).
1	August 10, 1990	Bank First, NA	$10 million	
2	August 31, 1990	First National Bank of Weirton	$4 million	
3	October 21, 1992	Liberty Bancshares, Inc.	$12 million	
4	October 23, 1992	Summit Holding Corporation	$22 million	
5	September 1, 1993	Financial Future Corporation	$18 million	
6	September 13, 1993	CB&T Westover Bank	$8 million	
7	October 31, 1995	First Commercial Bank	$11 million	
8	April 12, 1996	Eagle Bancorp, Inc.	$93 million	
9	August 1, 1997	First Patriot Bankshares Corporation	$39 million	
10	April 2, 1998	George Mason Bankshares, Inc.	$208 million	
11	October 1, 1998	Fed One Bancorp, Inc.	$92 million	
12	December 10, 2001	Century Bancshares Inc.	$70 million	
13	October 10, 2003	Sequoia Bancshares, Inc.	$112 million	
14	July 14, 2007	Premier Community Bankshares, Inc.	$200 million	
15	July 8, 2011	Centra Financial Holdings, Inc.	$185 million	
16	January 31, 2014	Virginia Commerce Bancorp, Inc.	$467 million	
17	June 3, 2016	Bank of Georgetown	$269 million	
18	April 21, 2017	Cardinal Bank	$929 million	
19	May 4, 2020	Carolina Financial Corp.	$1,100 million	
20	December 3, 2021	Essex Bank	$303 million	
