= Essex Reef Light =

Lighthouse in Connecticut, United States

Essex Reef Light Hayden's Point
- Location: Connecticut River; Essex; Connecticut; United States
- Coordinates: 41°20′42.6″N 72°22′36.2″W

Tower
- Constructed: 1889 (first)
- Foundation: concrete base
- Construction: metal skeletal tower (current) wooden tower
- Automated: 1912 (first)
- Height: 23 ft (7.0 m) (current); 21 ft (6.4 m) (first)
- Shape: square tower with green daymark and light (current) hexagonal tower with balcony and lantern (first)
- Power source: solar power

Light
- Deactivated: 1919 (first)
- Focal height: 26 ft (7.9 m) (current)
- Lens: 6th order Fresnel lens (original), LED (current)
- Characteristic: Fl G 4s.

The Essex Reef Light or Essex Reef Post Light, also known as Hayden's Point Light, was a light in Essex, Connecticut on the Connecticut River. The 21-foot (6.4 m) wooden tower was erected in 1889 and replaced with a skeleton tower by 1919. The skeleton tower was further altered to an automatic gas light a few years prior to 1931. Its keeper, Gilbert Burnett "Bernie" Hayden served for 30 years. As of 2014, a 26-foot (7.9 m) skeleton tower serves as an active daymark and it has a green flash every 4 seconds.

== Construction ==
The Essex Reef Light was constructed in 1889 as part of a $15,000 appropriation by Congress that included several other beacons. The exact cost of the structure is unknown. The light was a 21-foot (6.4 m) tall wooden hexagonal pyramidal tower with a black lantern that used a 6th order Fresnel lens. The 1900 Light List gave its position as 41.2036 North and 72.2254 West.

The hexagonal tower was accessible from a ladder directly by boat with no other landing. The foundation rests upon the river bottom and was a 15-foot (4.6 m) square crib that was made of yellow pine timbers and sheathed with planks that was filled with stones and protected by riprap. The crib extends up to the high water mark to a frustum of a 15-foot (4.6 m) square pyramid that is reduced to 10 feet (3.0 m) at its top and filled with stone. The sides and top are planked and the corners were covered with boiler plate and angle irons. The original light was a hexagonal beacon lantern made of brass and copper with a sixth order Fresnel lens. The oil for the light was stored in boxes in the lower portion of the lantern.

== Service ==
The Essex Reef Light was first lit on July 1, 1889. It featured a fixed red light until December 15, 1892, when it was changed to a fixed white light. In 1914, the light was deactivated for the winter in between January 12–15 and relit between March 14–16.

A skeleton tower was already in place by 1919 and the date of replacement or removal of the original light is unknown. On December 17, 1919, the light characteristic was changed from fixed white to flashing white every 3 seconds and it was reported that the light's strength was 70 candlepower. In 1931, The Day noted that the skeleton tower was "in recent years" converted to automatic gas beacons. In 1963, buoys were established near the Essex Reef light. Currently the skeleton tower is active with a height of 26 feet (7.9 m) and has a green flash every 4 seconds. It has a square green daymark with the number 25.

== Keepers ==
Gilbert B. Hayden (also known as Burnett or Bernie) was noted as a keeper of the light with sparse details found in The Day. In 1914, it noted his return to duties after a "few weeks vacation" that followed the light's deactivation for the winter. In 1931, The Day also contained information about Bernie's service, stating that he "gave the best part of his life to tending [the] Essex light". Bernie Hayden tended the light 30 years until his resignation in 1919. He made two trips by boat every day to light and extinguish the Essex Reef Light. He later became nearly blind and his friends petitioned the government for a pension, but was denied on the grounds that only those in exposed water positions could receive a pension. According to local tradition, it was commonplace for townspeople to tell Bernie Hayden that the light floated down the river and Bernie Hayden would join in the joke and claim to recover the light and return it to its rightful place.

== See also ==
- List of lighthouses in Connecticut
- List of lighthouses in the United States
