= Cardinal Bank =

Bank based in Virginia, US

Cardinal Financial Corporation
- Company type: Public
- Traded as: Nasdaq: CFNL
- Industry: Financial services
- Founded: 1997; 29 years ago
- Defunct: April 24, 2017
- Fate: Acquired by United Bank
- Headquarters: McLean, Virginia, U.S.
- Key people: Bernard H. Clineburg (CEO); Mark A. Wendel (CFO)
- Products: Banking
- Revenue: ▲$153.478 million (2016)
- Net income: ▲$50.491 million (2016)
- Total assets: ▲$4.210 billion (2016)
- Total equity: ▲$452.177 million (2016)
- Number of employees: 839 (2016)

Cardinal Bank was a bank headquartered in McLean, Virginia, that operated in Northern Virginia. It was a subsidiary of Cardinal Financial Corporation. It operated three business segments: commercial banking, mortgages, and wealth management services. In 2017, Cardinal was acquired by United Bank.

== History ==
Cardinal Financial Services was founded in November 1997 as a bank holding company, with Fairfax attorney and politician John H. "Jack" Rust, Jr. as Chairman.

In June 1998, the bank's first branch in McLean opened.

In July 1998, Cardinal Financial sold 2.6 million shares of stock at an initial price of $10/share.

In 1999, Cardinal Financial Services began operating Cardinal Wealth Services as its investment advisory subsidiary.

In July 2000, Cardinal Financial purchased Heritage Bancorp of Fairfax for $13.8 million.

Cardinal Financial struggled during its first five years of operations, losing a total of $24 million over that time. The complicated administrative structure needed to support its community bank model severely affected the company's profitability.

To remedy the company's ills, Rust recruited former George Mason Bank CEO Bernard H. Clineburg to run Cardinal Financial in the summer of 2001. Clineburg took over as CEO in October 2001, following the resignation of founding CEO L. Burwell Gunn.

Clineburg immediately collapsed the company's four banking units into one and laid off 33 of the bank's 135 employees. Cardinal also took a $8.3 million write-off on the 2000 purchase of Heritage Bancorp and a $1.7 million loss on a corporate bond from Worldcom.

In May 2002, Cardinal raised another $18.5 million with a stock sale priced at $3.50 per share.

In July 2004, Cardinal Financial Services bought George Mason Mortgage, LLC from the United Bank-Virginia unit of United Bankshares for $17 million.

In May 2009, Cardinal Financial raised $31 million with the sale of 4 million shares of stock at $7.75 each.

In April 2010, the company launched a middle school bank in Fairfax County, Virginia.

In May 2012, the United States Department of Justice concluded an investigation of lending discrimination and said that it did not intend to file a lawsuit against the bank.

In October 2012, the company revised an advertisement in the Washington Metro after locals confused the company logo with that of the St. Louis Cardinals.

In January 2014, Cardinal Financial acquired Vienna, Virginia-based United Financial Banking Companies, Inc., the holding company of The Business Bank, for $51.7 million.

In April 2017, United Bank acquired Cardinal Financial for $912 million.
