= First Baptist Church of Essex, Connecticut =

Church building in Connecticut, United States

Coordinates: 41.3550°N 72.3923°W

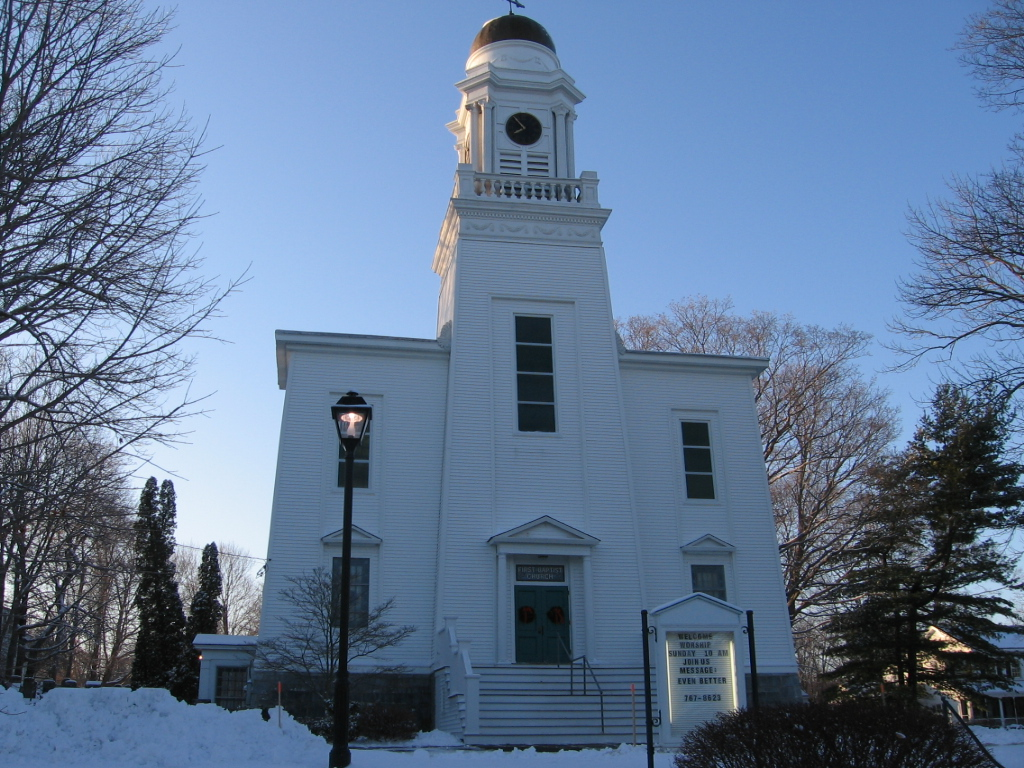
First Baptist Church. Built 1846

The First Baptist Church in Essex, Connecticut, built in 1846, is notable for being one of only three Egyptian revival churches known to have ever been built in the United States. The architect was Minard Lafever.

The handsome, white clapboard building features a tripartite facade, the central section of which is a frustum that rises to support the cupola. The church's original steeple was destroyed after being struck by lightning in 1925.
