= Essex Bank =

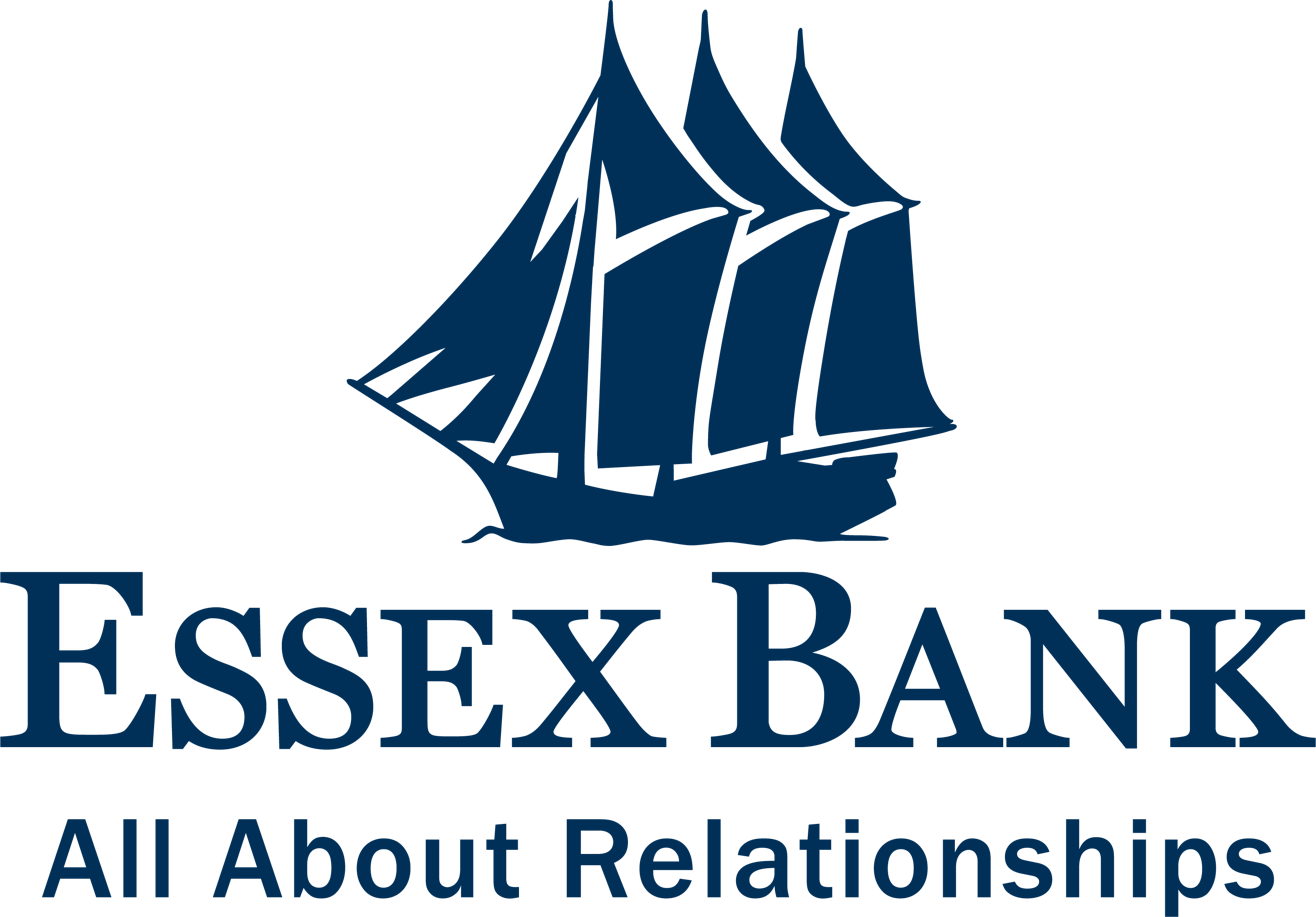
- Formerly: Essex Savings Bank
- Company type: Privately held company
- Industry: Banking
- Founded: August 6, 1851; 174 years ago
- Headquarters: Essex, Connecticut
- Key people: Diane Arnold, President & CEO; Lynn K. Giroux, Chief Operating Officer; Debra Brown, Chief Financial Officer
- Total assets: $489 million (2025)
- Total equity: $67 million (2025)
- Website: www.essex.bank

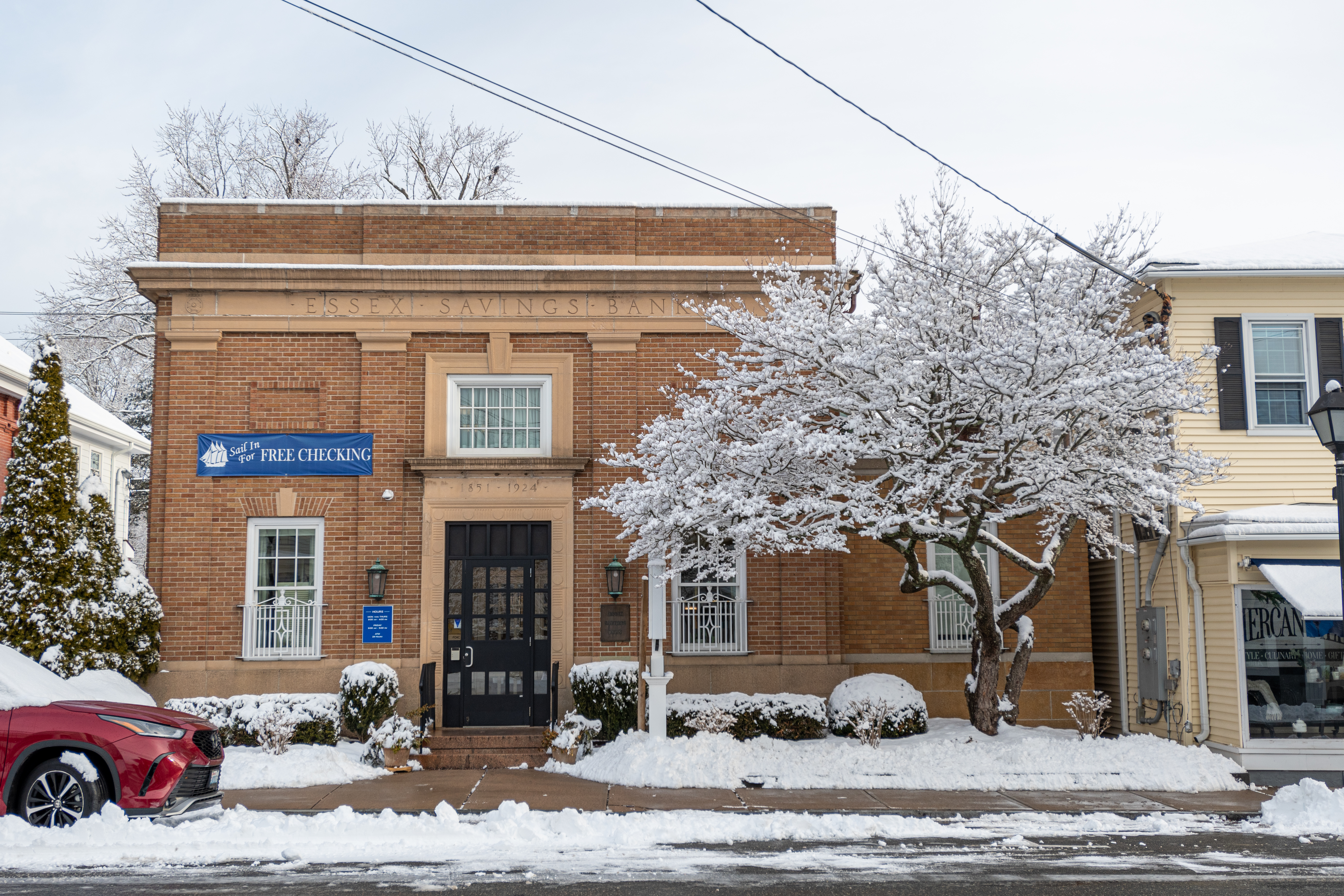
Essex Bank's first branch, located in downtown Essex, CT

Essex Bank is a mutual savings bank headquartered in Essex, Connecticut, United States. It operates 6 branches, all of which are in Connecticut. The company also operates a trust department and has 20 financial advisors with $3.4 billion of assets under management.

It is the 26th oldest bank in continuous operation in the United States. Worldwide, it is 108th.

Every year since 1995, the bank donates 10% of its net profits to local charitable organizations through its Community Investment Program (CIP). Cumulatively, the bank has donated over $6 million. A portion of these donations are decided by an annual customer vote.

== History ==
The bank was founded on August 6, 1851, by a group of shipmasters, businessmen, and entrepreneurs. The first bank president was co-founder Henry L. Champlin, a shipmaster who owned the Black X Line of packet ships. The bank's branch served as a gathering place for many skippers who met there between voyages to discuss their adventures. The ship featured in the bank's logo is an homage to its maritime origins.

Essex Bank launched its Community Investment Program in 1995, making it the first bank in Connecticut to voluntarily donate funds to the communities it serves. The bank's CIP Ballot allows customers to vote for their favorite nonprofit 501(c)(3)s, with funding being distributed according to the proportion of the total vote each organization received.

In 1999, Essex added a trust department. It was rebranded to Essex Trust in 2017.

The bank introduced Essex Financial, a subsidiary providing investment advisory services, in 2003. The firm and its advisors are regularly honored as some of the best in their region or country in publications such as Forbes and Barron's Weekly.

In 2015, John W. Rafal, the founder of the financial services division, was fired after he paid a referral fee in violation of regulations.

In 2025, the bank changed its name to Essex Bank to more accurately reflect its services.

== Community Work ==
Essex Bank has a history of donating and raising funds for the community. Since 1995, these donations have been provided through the bank's CIP.

=== 2025 ===
Essex contributed $33,684 to the Deep River Housing Authority, an organization that manages income-based elderly and disabled housing at Kirtland Commons in Deep River, Connecticut. The donation was put towards an upgrade to the facility's central air systems.

=== 2008 ===
Though the Ivoryton Playhouse playhouse received a $75,000 Small Town Economic Assistance Program grant from the state of Connecticut to repair its leaky roof and failing heating system, more money was needed to complete the projects. Essex Savings Bank spearheaded a community initiative to raise the remainder of the funds needed.

The Essex Housing Authority was awarded a $15,000 grant from Essex Bank's Community Reinvestment Act Fund, an annual program which provides donations to local non-profits. The grant was used for repairs to Essex Court which were not covered by the Small Cities Grant it received that year.

Kirtland Commons, a Deep River housing complex for the elderly, received an $8,000 donation from the mutual savings bank, which was put towards kitchen upgrades.

=== 2007 ===
The bank contributed $10,000 to the renovation of the Katharine Hepburn Cultural Arts Center, an Old Saybrook, Connecticut theater and museum celebrating perhaps the town's most famous resident, actress Katharine Hepburn.

The Hope Partnership, a nonprofit dedicated to creating affordable housing, benefitted from a $10,000 donation from Essex Savings Bank.
