= Old Saybrook Center, Connecticut =

Census-designated place in Connecticut, United States

- Census-designated place
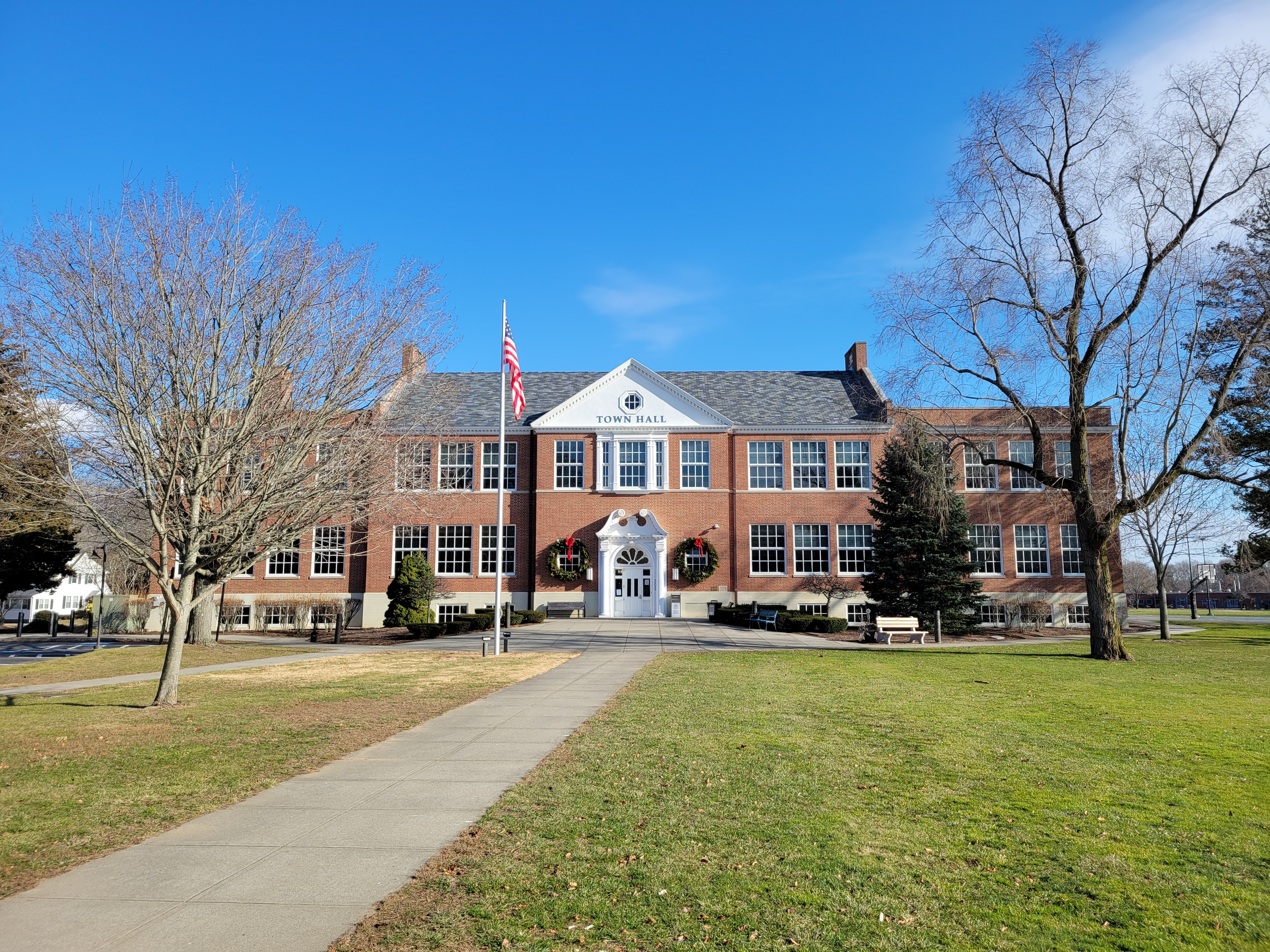
- Town Hall

- Location within Connecticut Location within the United States
- Coordinates: 41°17′34″N 72°22′54″W
- Country: United States of America
- State: Connecticut
- County: Middlesex
- Town: Old Saybrook

Area
  - Total: 2.88 sq mi (7.5 km^{2})
  - Land: 1.97 sq mi (5.1 km^{2})
  - Water: 0.91 sq mi (2.4 km^{2})
- Elevation: 16 ft (4.9 m)

Population (2020)
  - Total: 2,278
- Time zone: UTC-5 (EST)
  - Summer (DST): UTC-4 (EDT)
- ZIP code: 06475 (Old Saybrook)
- Area code: 860
- FIPS code: 09-57390
- GNIS feature ID: 2377847

Old Saybrook Center is the primary village and a census-designated place (CDP) in the town of Old Saybrook, Middlesex County, Connecticut, United States. The population was 2,278 at the 2020 census, out of 10,481 in the entire town of Old Saybrook. The CDP includes the traditional town center and the peninsula known as Saybrook Point.

== Geography ==
Old Saybrook Center is in the southeastern part of Middlesex County, in the central and eastern part of the town of Old Saybrook. It is bordered to the east by the tidal Connecticut River and its coves, North Cove near the center of the community and South Cove along the southern edge of the community. Saybrook Point, part of the CDP, occupies the land between the two coves.

U.S. Route 1 passes through the northwestern part of the community, leading west 8 miles (13 km) to Clinton and northeast 4 miles (6 km) to Old Lyme Center. Connecticut Route 154 passes through the center of Old Saybrook and leads north 5 miles (8 km) to Essex Village and southeast 3 miles (5 km) to Fenwick.

According to the United States Census Bureau, the Old Saybrook Center CDP has a total area of 2.9 square miles (7.5 km^{2}), of which 2.0 square miles (5.2 km^{2}) are land and 0.9 square miles (2.3 km^{2}), or 31.47%, are water.

== Demographics ==
=== 2020 census ===
As of the 2020 census, Old Saybrook Center had a population of 2,278. The median age was 57.4 years. 11.5% of residents were under the age of 18 and 35.0% of residents were 65 years of age or older. For every 100 females there were 85.7 males, and for every 100 females age 18 and over there were 86.0 males age 18 and over.

100.0% of residents lived in urban areas, while 0.0% lived in rural areas.

There were 1,120 households in Old Saybrook Center, of which 13.8% had children under the age of 18 living in them. Of all households, 42.8% were married-couple households, 15.4% were households with a male householder and no spouse or partner present, and 35.6% were households with a female householder and no spouse or partner present. About 36.4% of all households were made up of individuals and 21.9% had someone living alone who was 65 years of age or older.

There were 1,250 housing units, of which 10.4% were vacant. The homeowner vacancy rate was 1.3% and the rental vacancy rate was 6.9%.

Racial composition as of the 2020 census
Race	Number	Percent
White	1,984	87.1%
Black or African American	35	1.5%
American Indian and Alaska Native	1	0.0%
Asian	78	3.4%
Native Hawaiian and Other Pacific Islander	2	0.1%
Some other race	68	3.0%
Two or more races	110	4.8%
Hispanic or Latino (of any race)	131	5.8%

=== 2000 census ===
As of the 2000 census, there were 1,962 people, 908 households, and 548 families residing in the CDP. The population density was 994.3 inhabitants per square mile (383.9/km^{2}). There were 984 housing units at an average density of 498.7 per square mile (192.5/km^{2}). The racial makeup of the CDP was 96.08% White, 0.61% African American, 0.05% Native American, 2.14% Asian, 0.20% Pacific Islander, 0.66% from other races, and 0.25% from two or more races. Hispanic or Latino of any race were 1.68% of the population.

There were 908 households, out of which 19.9% had children under the age of 18 living with them, 50.6% were married couples living together, 6.8% had a female householder with no husband present, and 39.6% were non-families. 34.6% of all households were made up of individuals, and 19.6% had someone living alone who was 65 years of age or older. The average household size was 2.14 and the average family size was 2.74.

In the CDP, the population was spread out, with 17.3% under the age of 18, 4.3% from 18 to 24, 22.8% from 25 to 44, 28.2% from 45 to 64, and 27.3% who were 65 years of age or older. The median age was 48 years. For every 100 females, there were 88.5 males. For every 100 females age 18 and over, there were 84.9 males.

The median income for a household in the CDP was $50,625, and the median income for a family was $63,021. Males had a median income of $46,522 versus $41,250 for females. The per capita income for the CDP was $33,217. None of the families and 4.6% of the population were living below the poverty line, including no under eighteens and 7.5% of those over 64.
