= Centerbrook, Connecticut =

Hamlet in Connecticut, United States

Coordinates: 41.3515°N 72.4159°W

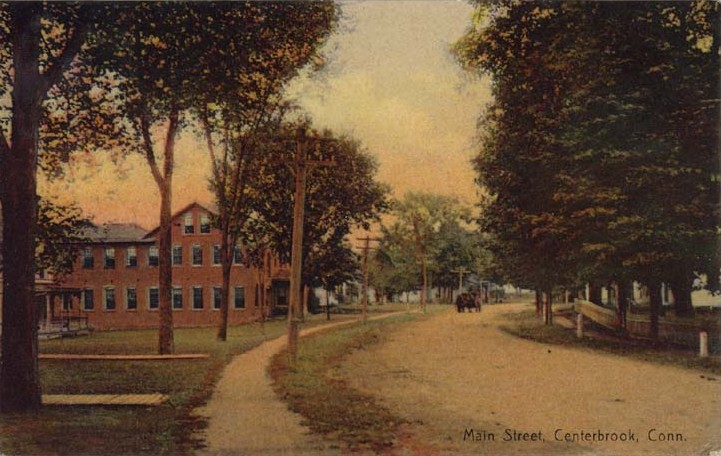
Main Street, Centerbrook, from a postcard mailed in 1910

Centerbrook is a hamlet located in the town of Essex, Connecticut, United States. The village is home to numerous businesses: the Essex Steam Train, a post office, and Essex Elementary School. It has many houses but it is generally considered the more commercial part of Essex.

The village consists of the area immediately west of the Route 9 expressway, extending southwest along Route 153 to Tiffany Brook, west along Main Street to Earl Street, and north along Route 154 to Route 9.

== Essex Elementary School ==
Essex Elementary School is the local school for residents of Essex. It serves grades K-6 and has around 560 students.

== Churches ==
There are two churches in Centerbrook- a Lutheran church, which sits on Main Street just before the school, and a Congregational Church, which sits between the Mobil station and the former Debbie's Restaurant.

== Post Office ==
The Centerbrook Post Office is located across from the VFW Memorial Hall. It serves the residents of Essex with the zip code of 06409.

== Veteran's Hall ==
The Essex Veteran's Hall and Veteran's Memorial is located on Route 154 in Centerbrook. It features a wall with the names of the Veterans from Essex who have served their countries bravely.

== Essex Steam Train ==
The main station of the Essex Steam Train is located in Centerbrook. The steam train has tracks from Amtrak's Shore Line (part of the Northeast Corridor) in Old Saybrook to Haddam. The steam train and riverboat ride goes from Essex to Chester on the train, but the Dinner Train goes from Essex to just north of Route 82 in Haddam.
