= Essex, Connecticut =

- Town
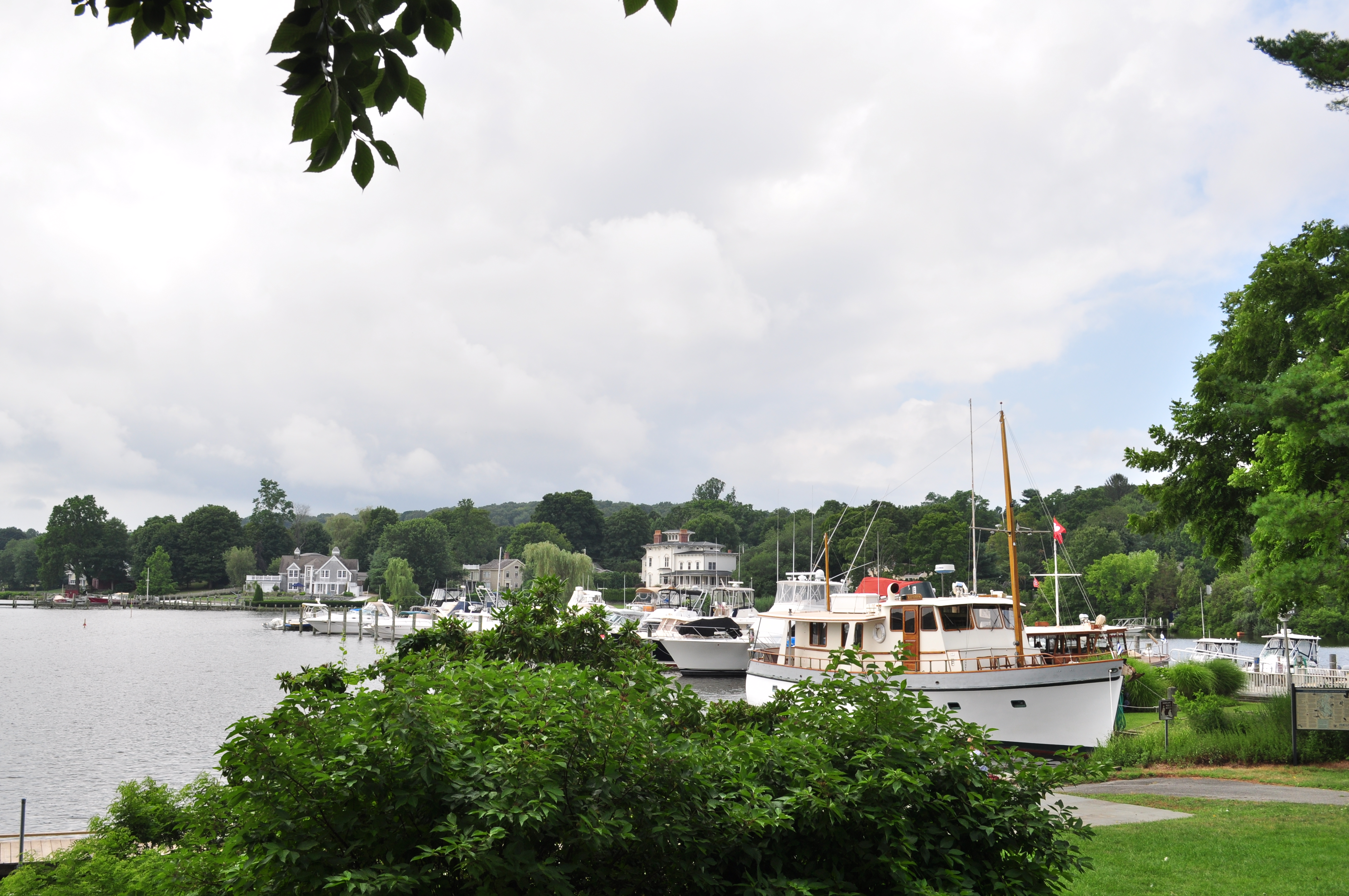
- View from Essex Park

- Flag Seal
- Interactive map of Essex, Connecticut
- Coordinates: 41°21′N 72°25′W
- Country: United States
- U.S. state: Connecticut
- County: Middlesex
- Region: Lower CT River Valley
- Incorporated: 1852
- Name changed: 1854

Government
  - Type: Selectman-town meeting
  - First Selectman: Norman Needleman

Area
  - Total: 11.8 sq mi (30.6 km^{2})
  - Land: 10.3 sq mi (26.8 km^{2})
  - Water: 1.5 sq mi (3.8 km^{2})
- Elevation: 39 ft (12 m)

Population (2020)
  - Total: 6,733
  - Density: 651/sq mi (251.2/km^{2})
- Time zone: UTC−5 (Eastern)
  - Summer (DST): UTC−4 (Eastern)
- ZIP code: 06409, 06426, 06442
- Area codes: 860/959
- FIPS code: 09-26270
- GNIS feature ID: 0213428
- Website: www.essexct.gov

Essex is a town in Middlesex County, Connecticut, United States. The town is part of the Lower Connecticut River Valley Planning Region. The population was 6,733 at the 2020 census. It is made up of three villages: Essex Village, Centerbrook, and Ivoryton.

== History ==
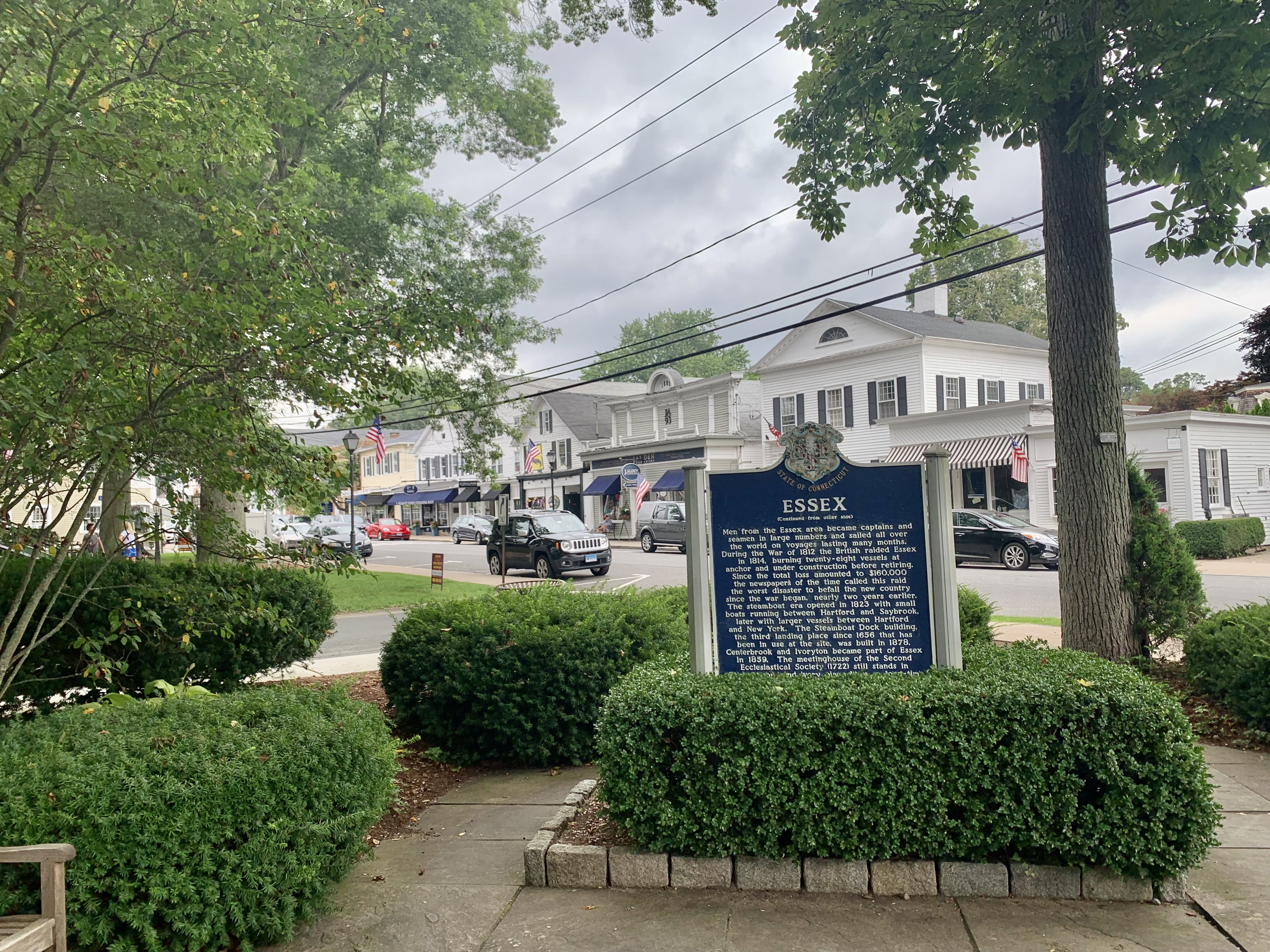
Historical marker sign in Essex Park

=== The Great Attack ===
Essex is one of the few American towns to have ever been attacked by a foreign power; this occurred on April 8, 1814, and the economic losses were among the largest sustained by the United States during the War of 1812. Twenty-eight vessels, with a total value estimated to be close to $200,000 (at a time when a very large two-story home in Essex, then known as Potapoug Point, would have been worth no more than $1,000), were burnt by British forces. One historian has called it the "Pearl Harbor" of that war.

On that date, approximately 136 British marines and sailors under the command of Richard Coote (or Coot) rowed 6 boats from four British warships (the Hogue, Endymion, Maidstone and Borer) anchored in Long Island Sound, 6 miles up the Connecticut River, past the unmanned fort in Old Saybrook, arriving at the boat launch at the foot of Main Street in Essex close to 4 A.M. The boats were armed with swivel guns loaded with grapeshot, the officers armed with swords and pistols, the marines with "Brown Bess" muskets, and the sailors with torches and axes; they responded to the single cannon fired by the town's surprised defenders with a massive volley, neither side incurring any casualties. They quickly commandeered the town, eliciting a promise of no resistance from the Essex militia in return for promising not to harm the townspeople or burn their homes, while a messenger rode to Fort Trumbull in New London for help. A dubious local myth states that Coote did not burn the town as a favor to a local merchant who greeted him with a secret Masonic handshake.

The British marched to the Bushnell Tavern (now the Griswold Inn), then seized the town's stores of rope (each ship of that time requiring 8 miles of rope) and, according to the April 19, 1814 Hartford Courant, "$100,000 or upwards" worth of rum (acquired from the East Indies in trade for beef and wood from Connecticut).

Their main targets, however, were the newly constructed privateers in the harbor, ready or nearly ready for sail, which they burned. Within 6 hours, their mission was accomplished, and the British went downstream with two captured ships in tow, including the Black Prince, a vessel that may well have primarily inspired the raid. Stranded in the river by low tide, they were forced to wait at the extreme range of the shots of the volunteers from the nearby town of Killingworth, Connecticut who lined the riverbanks; 2 marines were killed and the captured ships had to be destroyed, but the rest of the men escaped safely when the tide turned.

At the time of the raid, Essex (then known as Potopaug) had been a major center of shipping and shipbuilding, but was suffering under a blockade by the British; as a result, the privateers were being constructed. Captain Richard Hayden, a prominent shipbuilder, had advertised his Black Prince in a New York City newspaper as "a 315 ton sharp schooner that would make an ideal privateer." This may have caught the attention of the British, who then investigated Essex and launched the successful raid. Perhaps as a consequence of the practical, but somewhat less than heroic, response of the town to the raid, shortly afterwards, the name of the town was changed to Essex.

On the second Saturday of each May since 1964, the "Sailing Masters of 1812" of Essex commemorate the "Burning of the Ships" with an ancient fife and drum corps parade down Main Street and ceremony at the steamboat dock, wearing the United States naval uniform of that period; by tradition, this event is unpublicized. The Connecticut River Museum, situated at the site where Coot landed, now hosts an exhibit portraying the raid, featuring a large diorama by Russell Joseph Buckingham, a musket ball believed to have been fired then and a plank from the ship Osage, burned by the British. Plans are to expand the celebration of "the town's worst day in history" in future years, according to the museum's executive director, Jerry Roberts.

=== Historical architecture ===
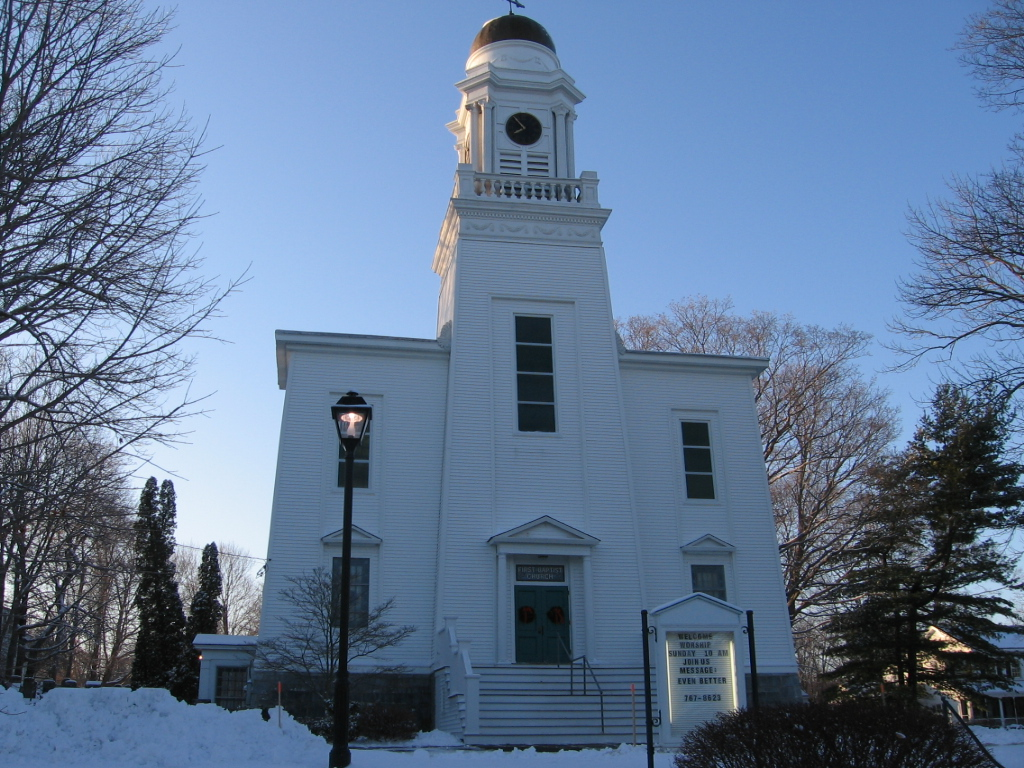
First Baptist Church of Essex, Connecticut. Built 1846

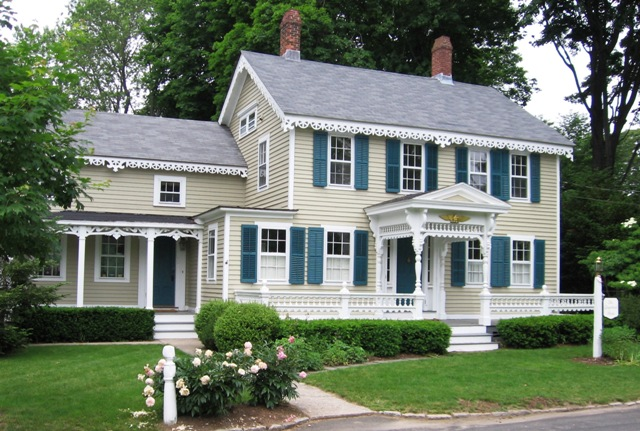
"Gingerbread House". Built 1855. An example of the architectural style found throughout Essex

Centerbrook, a fertile and productive agricultural area, was the "center" of town until the Revolutionary War. Many farmhouses remain from this era. The Selah Griswold House and Clark Nott House on Bokum Road are fine examples of two-story center chimney homes that were characteristic of the time. The Benjamin Bushnell Homestead on Ingham Hill Road falls into the same category. Also characteristic of Centerbrook were smaller Cape Cod type homes. The Snow House on Main Street, the Nott House on Westbrook Road, the Taylor Bushnell House on Ingham Hill Road, and the Silent Rose House near the train station are fine examples. The dominant building in Centerbrook, from a historical standpoint, is the Congregational Church. This structure is the second to stand here, and the oldest existing church building in Middlesex County.

There were a few homes built in Essex Village (known as Potapoug Point until 1854) during the first half of the 18th century. One of the more notable is the Pratt House on West Avenue, an "organic" structure built according to the immediate needs of the Pratt family. Shipbuilding dominated between the Revolution and the Civil War. As a result, the village came to be the focal point of the area. Many homes were erected between 1790 and 1820. By that time, Main Street had much the same make-up as today. The homes were primarily Federal, with one extended family dominating lower Main Street. The first eight structures (including the Griswold Inn) on the south side of this highway (starting at the waterfront) were either built or lived in by members of the Hayden family. Of these eight structures, only the one on the west side of Novelty Lane and the one on the east corner of Parker Lane were not built by this family. The fact that the well known Hayden Shipyard was directly south of these buildings was the primary reason for this situation. All these homes are different architecturally. The Ebenezer Hayden House (third from the river) was the initial hip-roof house in the lower valley, and the current Episcopal Church Rectory (the Richard Hayden Dwelling) was the first brick house in the lower valley. Pratt Street runs parallel to Main Street, and many houses on that thoroughfare not only were built in the Federal style, but have their roof lines perpendicular to the street, which allows for more homes to be erected on a given highway. In addition, there are two homes on Pratt Street that have Palladian windows in the garret area. Also of note is the 1846 Baptist Church on Prospect Street, one of three Egyptian Revival style churches in the United States.

As the construction of wooden sailing ships faded, the growth of the ivory and piano parts industry in the village of Ivoryton changed the focal point of Essex again. The growth of Comstock, Cheney & Co., one of the two largest producers of ivory products in the United States, made Ivoryton literally the center of Essex (and the lower Connecticut River Valley). The houses built here after the Civil war reflect the influence and affluence of that village. East Main Street, entering Ivoryton from Centerbrook is " Victorian Row." All the houses along this way were owned by executives or stockholders of Comstock, Cheney & Co. Contrast this with Essex Village, where there are relatively few Gothic or Victorian style dwellings, two examples of which are the 1855 "Gingerbread House" at the corner of Riverview Street and Maple Avenue, and the Parker House on North Main Street.

Perhaps the most culturally significant homes in town were built in Ivoryton during the 1890 to 1920 era. The factory was in desperate need of low-cost labor, and as a result, many immigrants from Italy and Poland came to work for Comstock, Cheney & Co. around the turn of the 20th century. The firm constructed many factory homesteads for these people. The great majority of these homes remain today, although most have been substantially altered. A journey through Blake, Oak, Walnut, and Chestnut Streets as well as Comstock Avenue is most revealing, as these factory homes give a glimpse into the past.

== Geography and climate ==
According to the United States Census Bureau, the town has a total area of 11.8 square miles (31 km^{2}), of which 10.4 square miles (27 km^{2}) is land and 1.5 square miles (3.9 km^{2}) (12.35%) is water.

The town is made up of three villages: Essex (ZIP code 06426), Centerbrook (06409) and Ivoryton (06442). The local public school, Essex Elementary School, educates approximately 560 students for grades K–6.

Climate

There are 4 distinct seasons in Essex. During Autumn, the leaves change colors and the temperatures fall. The average November high temperature is about 50 degrees. Snow is prevalent in winter, typically starting in December and lasting through March. The average January low temperature is about 19 degrees. In recent years winter have become erratic, with the first snowfall of winter 2006-2007 not reported until mid-late January. However, the winter of 2008-2009 was unusually cold and snowy, with over 50 inches of snow (compared to an average of about 30 inches) and days with temperatures below 0 degrees Fahrenheit in the morning. Spring is pleasant with temperatures averaging in the 60s. Summertime in Essex is warm and humid, with average July temperatures into the 80s.

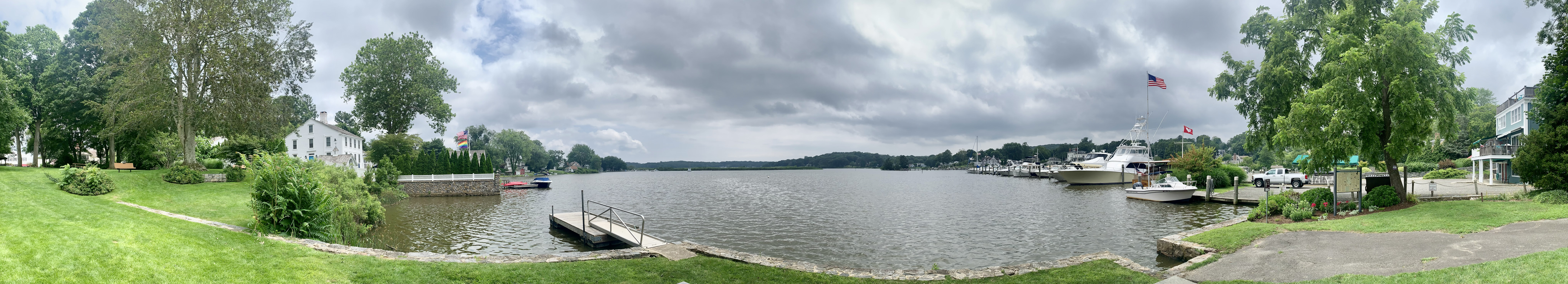
Panoramic view of Essex Harbor from Essex Park

== Demographics ==
Historical population
Census	Pop.	Note	%±
1850	950		—
1860	1,764		85.7%
1870	1,669		−5.4%
1880	1,855		11.1%
1890	2,035		9.7%
1900	2,530		24.3%
1910	2,745		8.5%
1920	2,815		2.6%
1930	2,777		−1.3%
1940	2,859		3.0%
1950	3,491		22.1%
1960	4,057		16.2%
1970	4,911		21.1%
1980	5,078		3.4%
1990	5,904		16.3%
2000	6,505		10.2%
2010	6,683		2.7%
2020	6,733		0.7%
U.S. Decennial Census

As of the census of 2000, there were 6,505 people, 2,811 households, and 1,776 families residing in the town. The population density was 627.6 inhabitants per square mile (242.3/km^{2}). There were 2,977 housing units at an average density of 287.2 per square mile (110.9/km^{2}). There were 2,811 households, out of which 27.2% had children under the age of 18 living with them, 55.6% were married couples living together, 5.2% had a female householder with no husband present, and 36.8% were non-families. 31.8% of all households were made up of individuals, and 16.3% had someone living alone who was 65 years of age or older. The average household size was 2.27 and the average family size was 2.87.

In the town, the population was spread out, with 21.9% under the age of 18, 3.6% from 18 to 24, 27.4% from 25 to 44, 27.7% from 45 to 64, and 19.5% who were 65 years of age or older. The median age was 43 years. For every 100 females, there were 89.6 males. For every 100 females age 18 and over, there were 86.9 males.

The median income for a household in the town was $66,746, and the median income for a family was $88,888. Males had a median income of $54,053 versus $38,276 for females. The per capita income for the town was $42,806. About 0.5% of families and 2.8% of the population were below the poverty line, including 1.0% of those under age 18 and 3.5% of those age 65 or over.

Voter Registration and Party Enrollment as of November 1, 2022
Party	Active voters	Inactive voters	Total voters	Percentage
Democratic	2,006	168	2,174	37.18%
Republican	1,314	98	1,412	24.14%
Unaffiliated	1,944	229	2,173	37.16%
Minor parties	79	10	89	1.52%
Total	5,343	505	5,848	100%

Presidential Election Results
Year	Democratic	Republican	Third Parties
2020	63.8% 3,011	34.7% 1,635	1.5% 69
2016	55.9% 2,291	39.6% 1,620	4.5% 181
2012	56.1% 2,230	42.9% 1,709	1.0% 44
2008	61.7% 2,542	37.4% 1,541	0.9% 37
2004	53.4% 2,201	44.9% 1,852	1.7% 65
2000	42.9% 1,865	51.7% 2,244	5.4% 229
1996	46.7% 1,630	40.6% 1,417	12.7% 439
1992	39.9% 1,503	36.9% 1,391	23.2% 870
1988	40.6% 1,300	58.4% 1,870	1.0% 32
1984	33.0% 1,012	66.6% 2,038	0.4% 10
1980	28.8% 852	54.1% 1,599	17.1% 502
1976	36.8% 1,044	62.7% 1,779	0.5% 13
1972	31.6% 886	67.4% 1,892	1.0% 27
1968	36.6% 895	59.8% 1,462	3.6% 88
1964	58.7% 1,294	41.3% 913	0.00% 0
1960	35.1% 814	64.9% 1,506	0.00% 0
1956	29.0% 651	71.0% 1,597	0.00% 0

=== Ancestry/Ethnicity ===
The largest self-reported ancestry groups in Essex, Connecticut are:

- English 24.9%
- Irish 23.1%
- Italian 18.6%
- German 15.5%
- Scottish 6.1%
- Polish 6.6%
- French 6.3%
- Swedish 5.0%

== Government ==
The Essex Town Hall is located on the corner of West Avenue and Grove Street in Essex.

=== Police/Fire/EMS ===
-Essex Police Department is attached to the rear of the town hall. Essex has a resident state trooper and five constables. The town pays the Connecticut State Police for a state trooper to supervise the constables. The First Selectman is considered the Chief of Police.

-Essex Fire Engine Co. 1 has two fire houses: the central fire house on the corner of Route 153 and Route 154 and the sub-station in Ivoryton on Summit Street. The Fire Department is the designated PSA holder for first responding to medical emergencies.

Elections for these positions are annual and voted by the department at an annual meeting. The department is limited by its charter with the town to 60 Members. The Fire Department responds to about 1000 calls each year, mostly medical first response calls, and fire alarms.

-Essex Ambulance Association, Inc. is an independent association, receiving town funding for workers' compensation insurance only. The association was founded in 1964, and is composed of 32 volunteers with MRT and EMT certification levels. The association operates three ambulances which respond to over 900 calls for service each year, and provides mutual aide to all surrounding towns. Elections for officers are held annually.

The association is self-sufficient, funded through billing and donations. The ambulance receives an intercept paramedic for Advanced Life Support when needed through Middlesex Hospital.

=== Libraries ===
There are two libraries in Essex: the Essex Library, located next to the Town Hall (corner of Grove St. and West Ave.) and one in the center of Ivoryton, the Ivoryton Library.] A resident can obtain a single card for both libraries. The Essex Library was recently rebuilt and is a center of the community, providing nearly 400 free programs a year for children and adults. It is an association library with 501(c)(3) non-profit status.

== Religion ==
The one Lutheran Church sits on Main Street in Centerbrook. There is a building which once housed a Methodist church on the corner of Prospect Street and Main Street, but it is no longer in use. The First Baptist Church of Essex, Connecticut, built in 1846, is notable for being one of only three Egyptian revival churches known to have ever been built in the United States. The architect was Minard Lafever.

There is also one Catholic Church, Our Lady of Sorrows, on Prospect Street in Essex Village, just a short walk from Essex downtown. After being destroyed by a fire in 1925, the new church was built on the foundations of an abandoned inn. Recently, the parish joined with the Chester, CT parish church.

== Education ==
Essex, like the other two towns in the "tri-town area" (Deep River and Chester), is a member of Regional School District #4. Essex Elementary School is located in Centerbrook and serves students in grades Pre-K–6 and serves about 350 students. John Winthrop Junior High School, located in Deep River, serves grades 7 and 8, and Valley Regional High School, located on Kelsey Hill Road in Deep River, serving grades 9–12, are the secondary schools for Regional School District #4.

== Culture and attractions ==
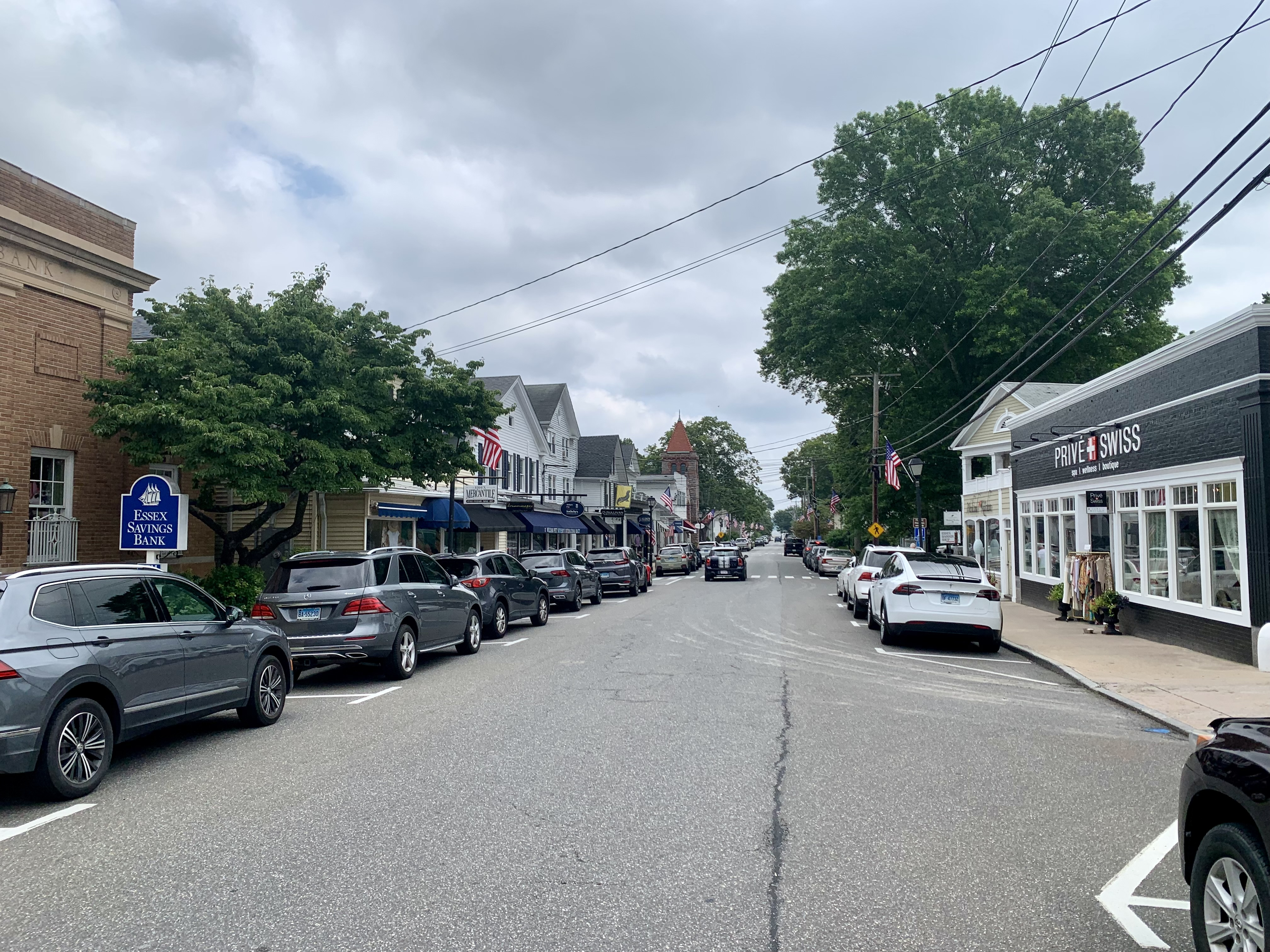
Main Street is home to many small shops, restaurants and boutiques

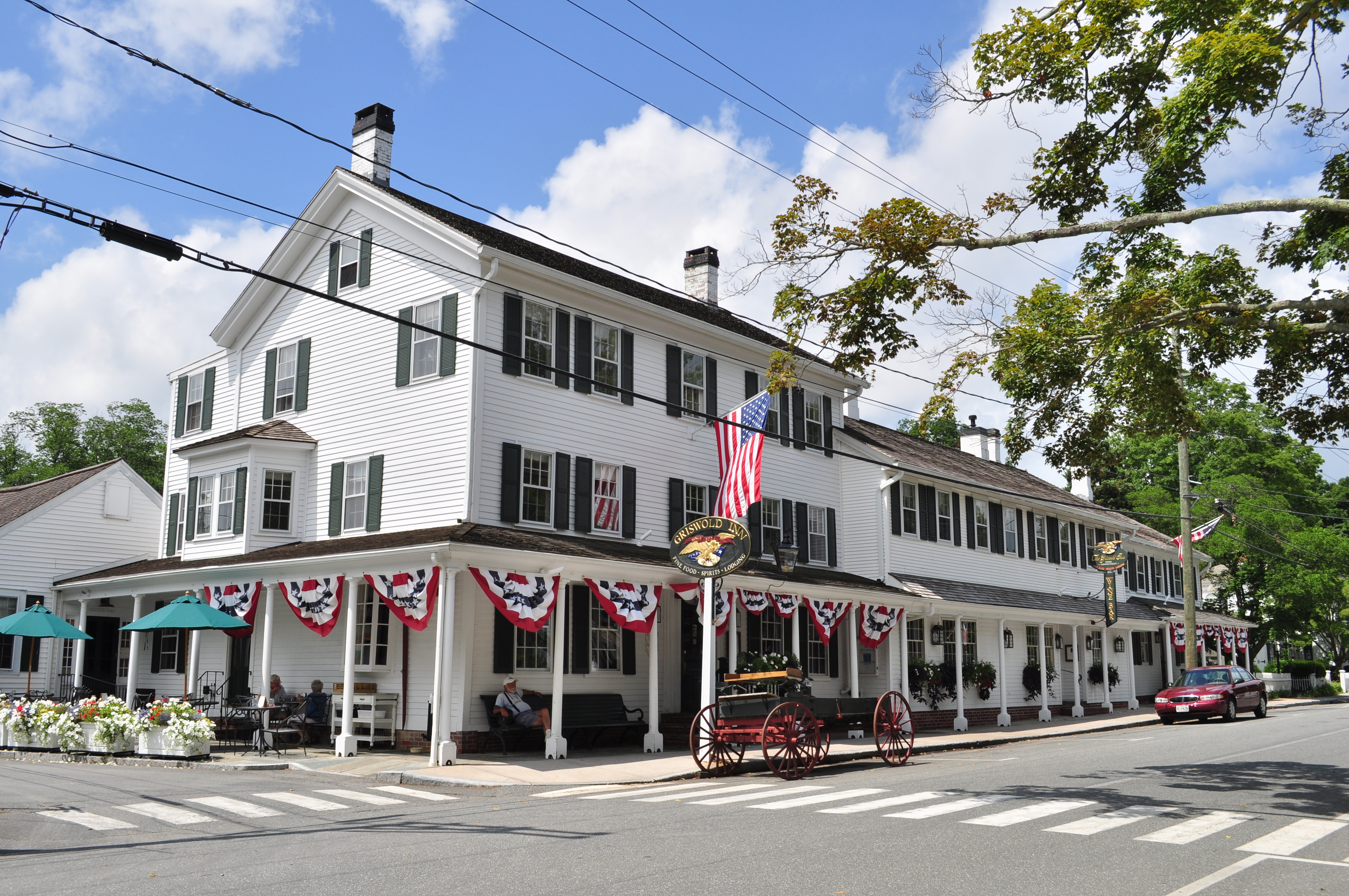
The Griswold Inn, 2013.

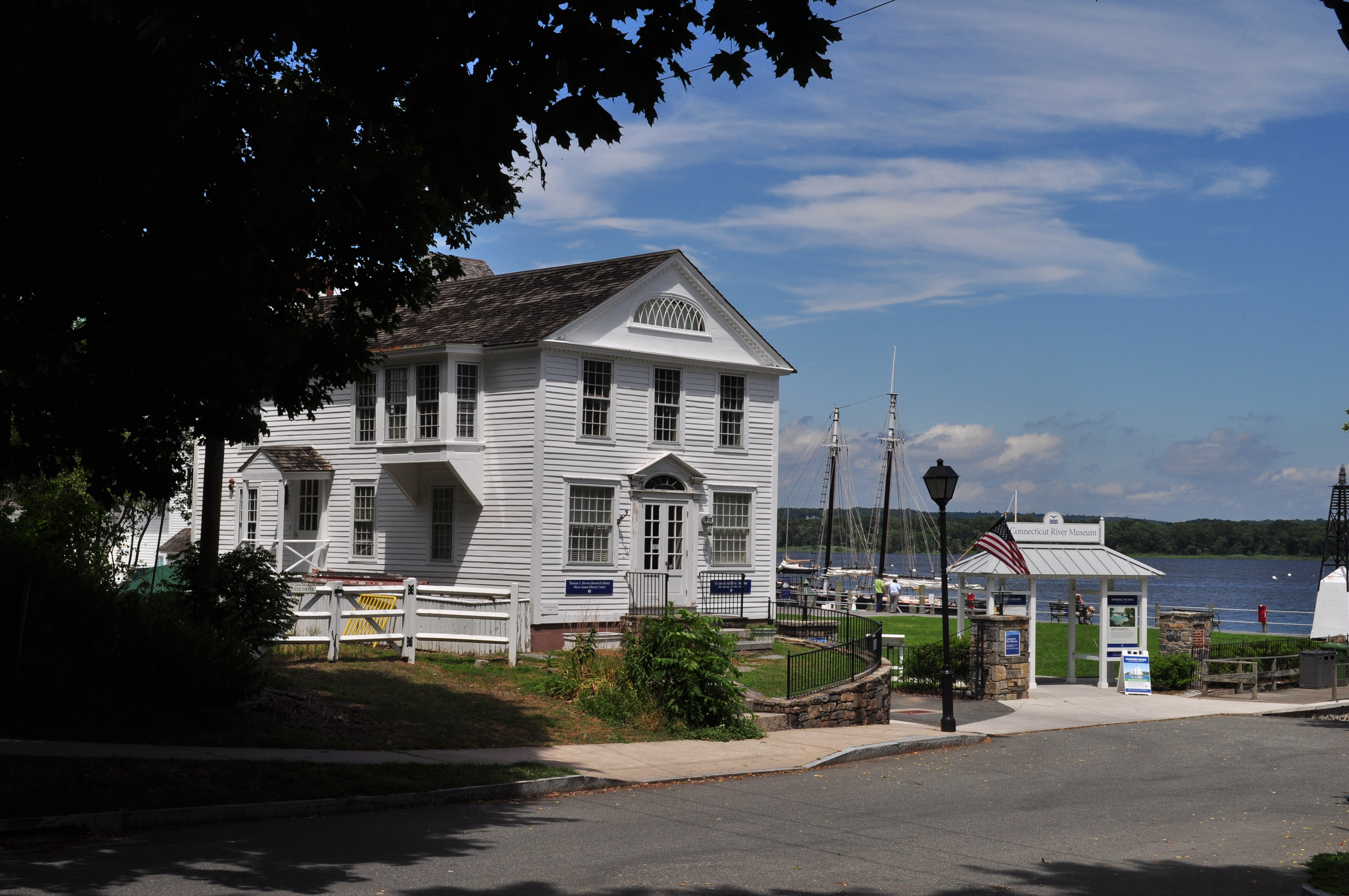
Connecticut River Museum, 2013

The town of Essex sponsors an annual Groundhog Day parade. A large papier mache groundhog named "Essex Ed" is carried through town with revelers making noise in order to rouse him from his slumber and bring an end to winter. The town also sponsors a "Loser's Day Parade," which celebrates the 1814 event of having 29 ships burned in Essex harbor during a raid by British marines. The first Saturday in June there is a Shad Bake sponsored by the Rotary Club of Essex.

In 1851 was founded the Essex Savings Bank located on the Main Street (today on the Plains Road), one of the oldest still functioning banks in Connecticut.

The Essex Art Association Gallery at 10 North Main Street was founded in 1946 by a group of avant-garde artists. It is open 1–5 PM daily during the summer months. It is housed in a historic schoolhouse. Artists are invited to take part in the six shows held each season.

The Essex Steam Train is one of the most famous and popular Essex attractions. The main station is located in Centerbrook, with other stations in Deep River, Chester, and Haddam. The regular train ride goes from Essex to Deep River and then the Becky Thatcher Riverboat takes the passengers up to the Haddam area. The Essex Clipper Dinner Train goes from Essex all the way up to Haddam. A few times a year Thomas the Tank Engine comes to town and it’s a large attraction for the children. During the holiday season, the Essex Steam Train has a North Pole Express where you can celebrate the spirit of the season with elves and Mr. and Mrs. Claus.

The Ivoryton Playhouse is a regional theater located in Essex's village of Ivoryton. The theater produces 8–12 plays and musicals each year.

The Connecticut River Museum, located at the end of Main Street and right on the Connecticut River, is home to numerous river artifacts and is home to the Connecticut River Eagle Festival each year.

== Transportation ==
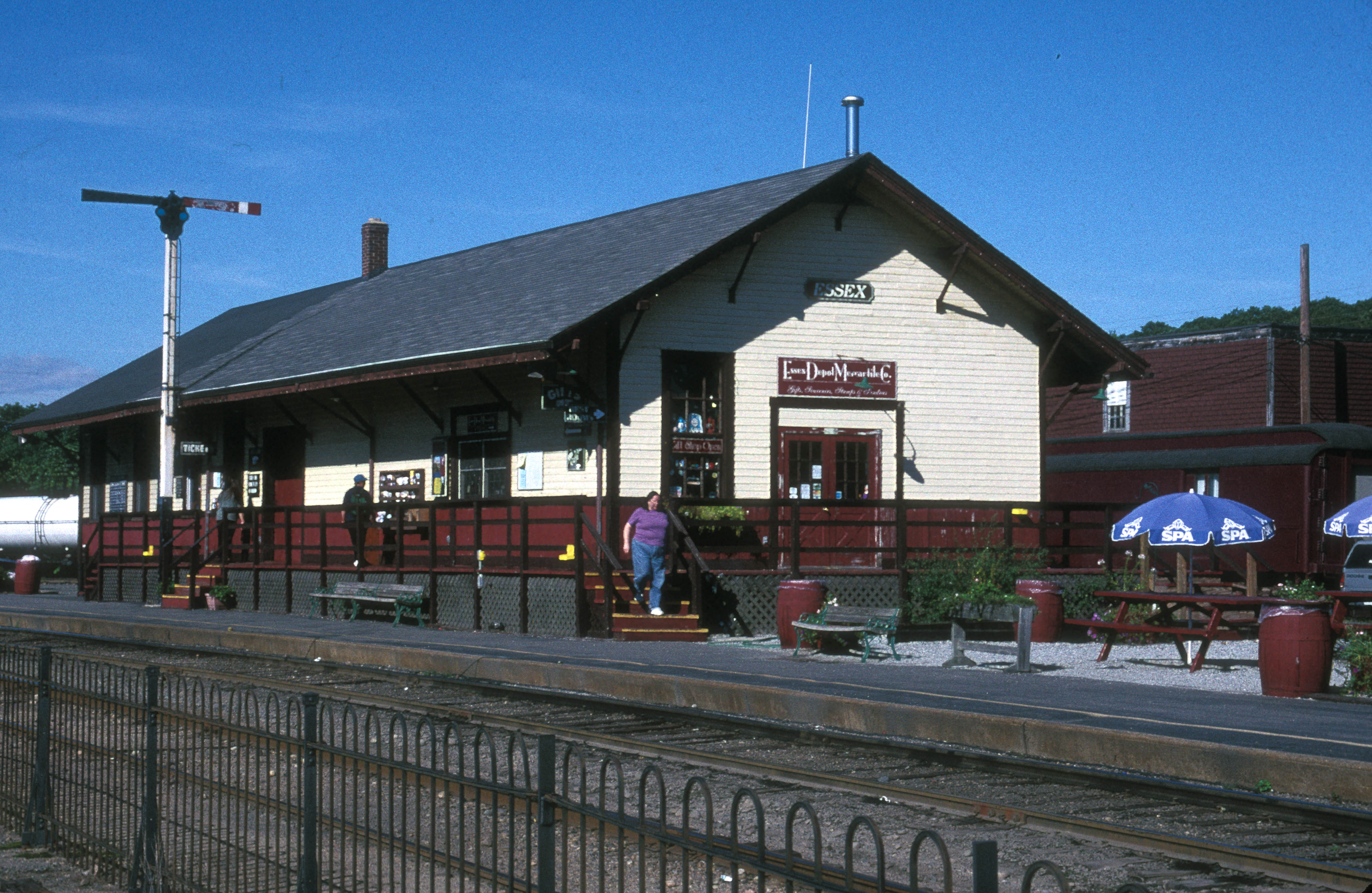
Essex station, October 1970. The station is now used as a ticket office for the Essex Steam Train heritage railway.

The Estuary Transit District provides public transportation throughout Essex and the surrounding towns through its 9 Town Transit Service. Services include connections to the Old Saybrook Train Station, served by Amtrak and Shore Line East railroads.

== National Historic Sites in Essex ==
- Benjamin Bushnell Farm, added May 10, 1990
- Centerbrook Congregational Church, added February 12, 1987
- Christeen, added December 4, 1991
- Comstock-Cheney Hall (The Ivoryton Playhouse), added April 15, 1982
- Essex Freight Station, added April 19, 1994
- Hill's Academy, added August 23, 1985
- Pratt House, added August 23, 1985
- Steamboat Dock Site, added April 1, 1982

== Sister cities ==
- Deschapelles, Haiti

== See also ==
- Essex Reef Light
