= Essex Village, Connecticut =

Census-designated place in Connecticut, United States

- Census-designated place
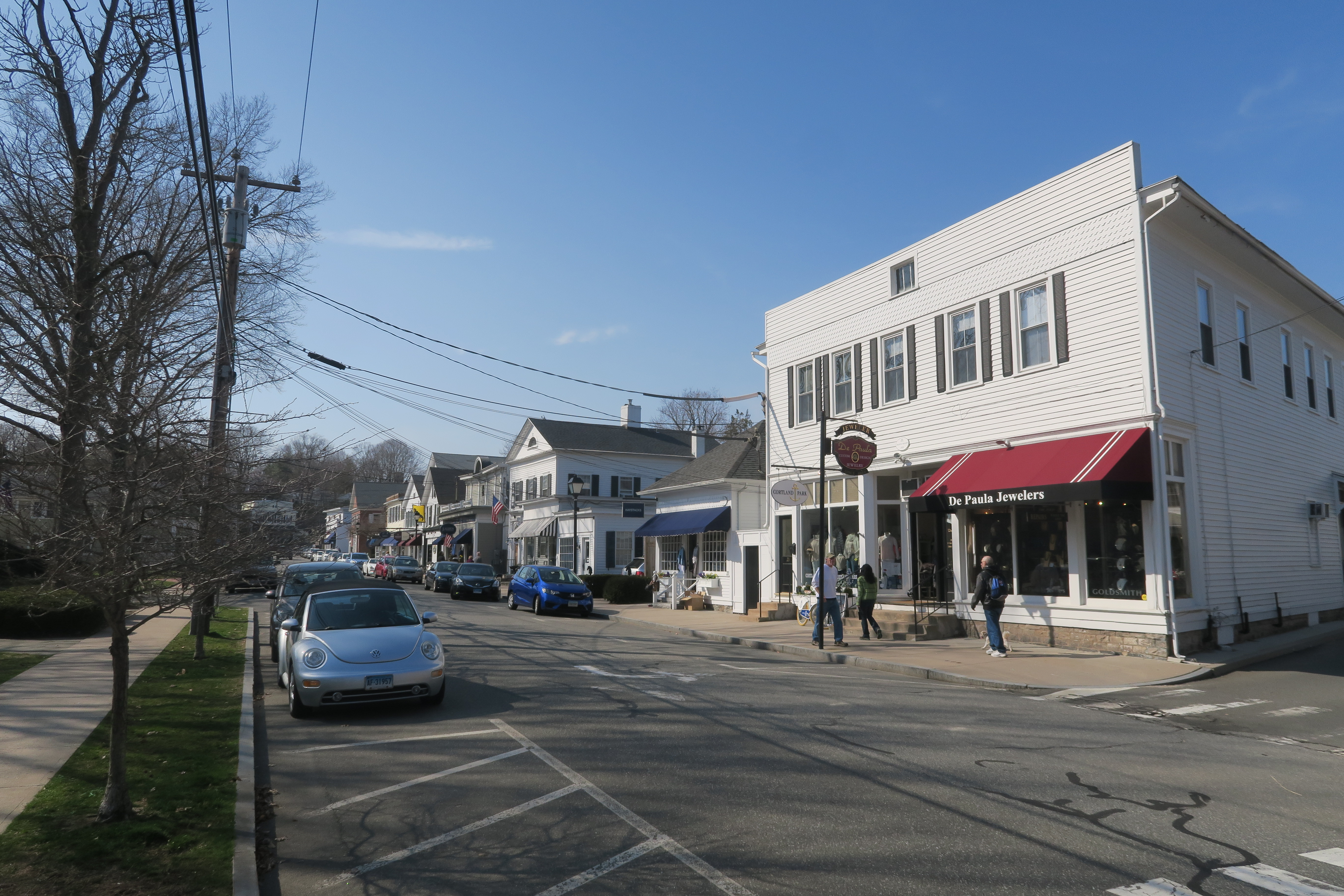
- Main Street

- Location within Connecticut Location within the United States
- Coordinates: 41°21′12″N 72°23′27″W
- Country: United States
- State: Connecticut
- County: Middlesex
- Town: Essex

Area
  - Total: 5.16 sq mi (13.4 km^{2})
  - Land: 3.84 sq mi (9.9 km^{2})
  - Water: 1.32 sq mi (3.4 km^{2})
- Elevation: 40 ft (12 m)

Population (2020)
  - Total: 2,583
  - Density: 1,742/sq mi (672.5/km^{2})
- Time zone: UTC-5 (Eastern (EST))
  - Summer (DST): UTC-4 (EDT)
- ZIP Code: 06426 (Essex)
- Area codes: 860/959
- FIPS code: 09-26370
- GNIS feature ID: 2377820

Essex Village is a village and census-designated place (CDP) in the town of Essex, Connecticut, United States. The population was 2,583 at the 2020 census, out of 6,733 in the entire town of Essex. The government offices of the town are located within the village.

== Geography ==
The village is located in the eastern part of the town, along the banks of the Connecticut River. The census-designated place extends from the border of the town of Old Saybrook in the south to the Deep River town line in the north. The western edge of the CDP runs from north to south along the border of the Canfield-Meadow Woods Nature Preserve; Dennison Road; small portions of the Falls River and Connecticut Routes 154 and 621; the Mud River; the Connecticut Valley Railroad; and Bokum Road. The Route 9 expressway passes through the western part of the CDP, with access from Exit 3.

According to the United States Census Bureau, the CDP has a total area of 5.16 square miles (13.4 km^{2}), of which 3.84 square miles (9.9 km^{2}) are land and 1.32 square miles (3.4 km^{2}), or 25.58%, are water.

== Demographics ==
=== 2020 census ===
As of the 2020 census, Essex Village had a population of 2,583. The median age was 59.5 years. 13.3% of residents were under the age of 18 and 37.3% of residents were 65 years of age or older. For every 100 females there were 91.3 males, and for every 100 females age 18 and over there were 87.8 males age 18 and over.

74.4% of residents lived in urban areas, while 25.6% lived in rural areas.

There were 1,248 households in Essex Village, of which 15.9% had children under the age of 18 living in them. Of all households, 55.7% were married-couple households, 13.1% were households with a male householder and no spouse or partner present, and 25.5% were households with a female householder and no spouse or partner present. About 31.4% of all households were made up of individuals and 17.6% had someone living alone who was 65 years of age or older.

There were 1,407 housing units, of which 11.3% were vacant. The homeowner vacancy rate was 2.0% and the rental vacancy rate was 4.8%.

Racial composition as of the 2020 census
Race	Number	Percent
White	2,428	94.0%
Black or African American	12	0.5%
American Indian and Alaska Native	8	0.3%
Asian	27	1.0%
Native Hawaiian and Other Pacific Islander	1	0.0%
Some other race	18	0.7%
Two or more races	89	3.4%
Hispanic or Latino (of any race)	97	3.8%

=== 2000 census ===
As of the census of 2000, there were 2,573 people, 1,190 households, and 727 families residing in the CDP. The population density was 734.9 inhabitants per square mile (283.7/km^{2}). There were 1,286 housing units at an average density of 367.3 per square mile (141.8/km^{2}). The racial makeup of the CDP was 98.29% White, 0.43% African American, 0.08% Native American, 0.51% Asian, 0.12% from other races, and 0.58% from two or more races. Hispanic or Latino of any race were 0.93% of the population.

There were 1,190 households, out of which 21.1% had children under the age of 18 living with them, 55.0% were married couples living together, 4.8% had a female householder with no husband present, and 38.9% were non-families. 34.3% of all households were made up of individuals, and 14.6% had someone living alone who was 65 years of age or older. The average household size was 2.11 and the average family size was 2.71.

In the CDP, the population was spread out, with 18.0% under the age of 18, 2.9% from 18 to 24, 22.7% from 25 to 44, 34.4% from 45 to 64, and 22.0% who were 65 years of age or older. The median age was 49 years. For every 100 females, there were 91.9 males. For every 100 females age 18 and over, there were 88.7 males.

The median income for a household in the CDP was $78,763, and the median income for a family was $109,276. Males had a median income of $68,281 versus $52,889 for females. The per capita income for the CDP was $51,928. About 1.3% of families and 3.5% of the population were below the poverty line, including 2.9% of those under age 18 and 1.3% of those age 65 or over.
