= Anna Louise James =

American pharmacist

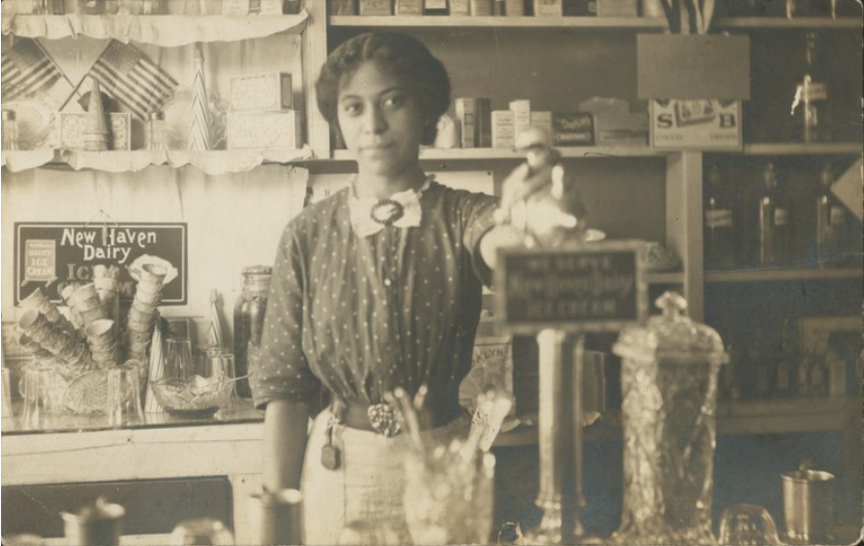
Anna Louise James at the James' pharmacy c. 1909-1911

Anna Louise James (January 19, 1886 - 1977) was the first female African American pharmacist in Connecticut. She operated the James Pharmacy in Old Saybrook, Connecticut, for fifty years.

== Biography ==
=== Early life and education ===
Anna Louise James was born on January 19, 1886, in Hartford, Connecticut, to Willis Samuel James and Anna Houston. Willis Samuel James was enslaved on a plantation in Virginia, and escaped to Connecticut. Willis James and Anna Houston married in 1874.

In 1902, James graduated from Hartford's Arsenal Elementary School. Her family then moved to Old Saybrook, Connecticut, where she attended the local high school and graduated in 1905. Her family was one of the few Black families living in Old Saybrook. James graduated from the Brooklyn College of Pharmacy in 1908, as the first African American woman graduate and the first African American woman to be licensed as a pharmacist in Connecticut.

After the 19th amendment was passed, legalizing women's suffrage, James was one of the first women to register to vote and was very active in the Republican Party.

=== Career ===
After graduating from college, James ran a drugstore in Hartford. In 1911, she went to work with her brother-in-law, Peter Lane, at his Lane Pharmacy in Old Saybrook.

After Lane left the pharmacy in 1917, James took over the pharmacy, becoming the sole owner in 1922 and renaming it James Pharmacy. James lived upstairs, and kept the pharmacy open every day, with half days on Thanksgiving, Christmas, and New Year's Day. James made extensive alterations to the pharmacy, which had been originally built in the 1790s as a general store. In 1967, she retired and closed the pharmacy, yet continued to live upstairs until her death in 1977.

=== Family ===
James' niece, Ann Lane Petry, was a writer, whose debut novel The Street was the first novel by an African American woman to sell more than a million copies.
