= In Darkness and Confusion =

Short story by Ann Petry

- Editor: Edwin Seaver
- Author: Ann Petry
- Genre: short story
- Publication date: 1947

"In Darkness and Confusion" is a short story written by Ann Petry, published in the third volume of Cross Section in 1947.

== Summary ==
In 1947 from the anthology cross section, Ann Petry wrote a short story by the name of "In Darkness and Confusion." In Darkness and Confusion focuses on an African American family that is located in Harlem during the time of racial injustice. This family lives in Harlem facing terrible racism, discrimination, poverty, police brutality, lack of housing, and other challenges. This short story focuses on the character William Jones and the upbringing of his family.

His wife Pink, his niece Annie Mae, and his son Sam. To begin the story, William Jones is looking forward to eating breakfast. In this moment he is dissatisfied and distracted, he takes a sip of his coffee and instantly puts it back down. A normal day breakfast is one of the best parts of William's day, however this Saturday morning it was too hot and cramped in the house to function. William now has to deal with this issue already being under pressure and overwhelmed by the issues of poverty and working.

William then goes to the bedroom with his wife Pink and he's not focused. Pink goes about her day like her daily routine moving around the bedroom, talking to her husband, getting dressed, and William combing her hair. As soon as Pink goes down to the kitchen William decides that is when he will get dressed and go to work. Because he is already so stressed and his mind is so heavy he doesn't hear his wife and awaits mail from his son Sam.

As the morning continues, he is also thinking about the troubles of Annie Mae. Before Annie Mae goes to work, she takes a hot bath and uses a hot comb on her hair. William is not functioning like his normal self that he is getting irritated by the smell of hot irons and hair grease. He is unpleased about how Annie Mae is only eighteen years of age and stays out all times of the night as she pleases.

William is tired and something has to be done about Annie Mae's behavior. He wanted to tell Pink about the problems, but he did not want to worry her because of Pink's past. Every time William tried to discipline Annie Mae Pink would get in the way, William is so frustrated by Annie Mae and Pink laughing at him he rushes down the stairs.

He is also thinking about Pink's weight. She keeps getting bigger and bigger that they are looking to move to a first floor instead of the top floor they currently live on. This issue brings money trouble to William because the first-floor cost more. William before he leaves gets upset at Pink because she is getting dressed in unusual accessories, so he's suspecting that something is going on. Then is when he ask's her if she is going to work and she tells him she lost her job. William is upset because he's already struggling to provide and Pink doesn't care to keep a job.

As the story continues and William is now working, he is troubled by his atmosphere. He notices and understands that there are broader issues that goes beyond the issues in his home going on in Harlem. These issues brought great tension to the neighborhood and leads to chaos. William unpleased by what is going on in his community, he becomes an advocate and leader that would eventually lead to the Harlem riot. While there are so many problems in Harlem, he still stresses about his son Sam. Sam is a black man stationed in Georgia, so the stress for William is extreme.

The "darkness" in this short story does not only support the physical stress such as the heat and small space, but also the emotional impact. Also, the injustice that African American people had to face in Harlem. The "confusion" supports how William is troubled worrying about his daily life, family and the extreme worrying of his son. Petry uses this story to bring light to the problems that African Americans face in society. It all roots from inequality, frustration, discrimination, and other injustice.

== Background ==
"In Darkness and Confusion" was originally published in Ann Petry's short fiction collection, Miss Muriel and Other Stories (1971). As Ann Petry started as a short fiction writer, it would later in her career be interfered with by an editor from Houghton Mifflin. In consideration of their literary fellowship program, the editor requested for Petry to write a novel.

After Petry's first significant short story "On Saturday the Siren Sounds at Noon" that was published 1943 of December, is when the editor asked Petry to write a novel. Although this publication of Petry in the Crisis was significant, it was not her first time in print. "Marie of the Cabin Club" already surfaced as Petry's first published short story in the Baltimore Afro-American in 1939. Petry hid herself covering her gender and identifying under a male's name Arnold Petri.

After Petry's first novel "The Street", she published eight short stories throughout the year of 1943 through 1947. Petry would later collect six of those eight stories in her book Miss Muriel and Other Stories. Following the publishing of her short stories, she also would incorporate five stories published in the 1950s through the 1960s including "The Witness."

Twelve stories in Miss Muriel were originally published in anthologies such as Cross Section and Soon One Morning: New Writing by American Negroes, also published in magazines and journals such as Crisis, RedBook, The New Yorker, Phylon, Magazine of the Year, Opportunity, and the official publication of the National Urban League. Ann Petry became the second African American woman to publish a collection of short stories along publication of Miss Muriel and Other Stories in 1971.

== Themes ==
Explained by George R. Adams, In Darkness and Confusion he connects relation to the Harlem riot of 1943. Adams also explores that Petry connects social tension that is existing during this period. Adam examines the story in the context of the riot and the historical context, keeping focus of the relationship between the community atmosphere and social unrest. The Harlem riot of 1943 describe by Adams as "a structured social response" rather than an isolated outbreak of violence.

Clark examines how Petry's novels and short stories are way further than just social concerns. According to Clark, he describes one of the topics as "multifaceted portraitures of black masculinity." Clark also highlights how he senses the use of black gothic being incorporated in Petry's writings. In most of Petry's short stories the main character appears to be aa black male and has his issues.
