= James Pharmacy =

- U.S. National Register of Historic Places
- U.S. Historic district – Contributing property
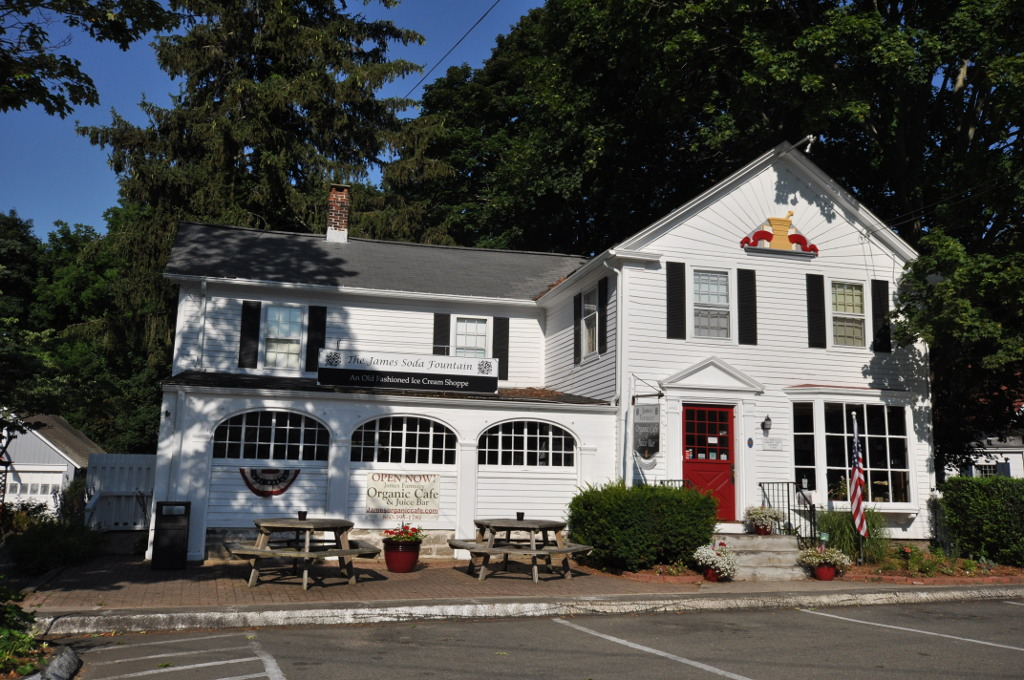

- Location within Connecticut Location within the United States
- Location: 2 Pennywise Lane, Old Saybrook, Connecticut
- Coordinates: 41°17′9″N 72°22′35″W
- Area: .25 acres (0.10 ha)
- Built: 1820
- Architectural style: Federal and Colonial Revival
- Part of: Old Saybrook South Green (ID76001984)
- NRHP reference No.: 94000845

Significant dates
- Added to NRHP: August 5, 1994
- Designated CP: September 3, 1976

The James Pharmacy is a historic building at 2 Pennywise Lane in Old Saybrook, Connecticut. Built in an evolutionary manner beginning about 1820, it is significant as the home and workplace of Anna Louise James (1886–1977), who was the first African-American woman pharmacist in the state, and owned the pharmacy for some time. It is also the birthplace and childhood home of author Ann Petry, who was James' niece. The building was listed on the National Register of Historic Places in 1994, and is a contributing element in the Old Saybrook South Green district.

== Description and history ==
The James Pharmacy building is located near the southern end of Old Saybrook's historic town center, at the southwest junction of Main Street and Pennywise Lane. It is a 2 1/2-story wood-frame structure, shaped like an L and covered by a gabled roof. It is finished in wooden clapboards, and has a single-story shed-roof section filling the crook of the L. That section's facade consists of three segmented-arch bays, articulated by pilasters and filled in the lower part by siding and the upper part by fixed multi-pane windows. To its right is the projecting main block, with the entrance on the left side, framed by pilasters and a pedimented gable, and a 20th-century bay window on the right. The gable is filled by siding in a sunburst pattern, with a carved mortar and pestle motif at the center.

The building was acquired around 1898 by Peter and Bertha (James) Lane, an African-American couple. Peter Lane was one of the first African-American pharmacists in the state, and the couple was eventually joined by Bertha's younger sister Anna. She followed Peter into the pharmacy business, earning her pharmacist's license in 1911. Overcoming discrimination based both on sex and race, Anna James operated the business until her retirement in 1955. Customers included several high-profile summer residents of the area, Katharine Hepburn and Howard Hughes among them.

== See also ==
- National Register of Historic Places listings in Middlesex County, Connecticut
