= The Narrows (Petry novel) =

Novel by Ann Petry

- First edition (publ. Houghton Mifflin)
- Author: Ann Petry
- Language: English
- Publisher: Houghton Mifflin
- Publication date: 1953
- OCLC: 690463
- LC Class: PZ3.P44904 Nar

The Narrows is a 1953 novel by African-American writer Ann Petry. The name "The Narrows" is the African-American section of the fictional town of Monmouth, Connecticut, in which most of the novel's action takes place.

Though less famous than Petry's earlier novel, The Street, The Narrows is her longest novel and, critic Hilary Holladay argues, her most complex: “The Narrows represents the full flowering of Petry’s preoccupation with human relationships.”

The novel is written in the third person and narrated from the perspectives of several different characters, often in flashback episodes. Occasionally, especially during intense periods, the narration switches to the first person.

== Setting ==
The epigraph in The Narrows from Henry V suggests that Shakespeare’s history play is the inspiration for the fictional town name of Monmouth, Connecticut:

“... I tell you, captain, if you look in the maps of the ’orld, I warrant you sall find, in the comparisons between Macedon and Monmouth, that the situations, look you, is both alike. There is a river in Macedon; and there is also moreover a river at Monmouth: it is called Wye at Monmouth; but it is out of my prains what is the name of the other river; but ’tis all one, ’tis alike as my fingers is to my fingers, and there is salmons in both.” (Fluellen, King Henry V, Act IV, vii)

“The Narrows” is an "area" or "section" within Monmouth. It's also called by the names "Eye of the Needle," "The Bottom," "Little Harlem," "Dark Town," and "Niggertown" because, as the narrator writes, "Negroes had replaced those earlier immigrants, the Irish, the Italians and the Poles.”

Abbie Crunch's home, one of the primary settings of the novel, is located on Dumble Street in "The Narrows." As an undesirable riverfront street, "The people who lived here near the waterfront fumbled and they mumbled and they stumbled and they tumbled, ah, yes, make up a word — dumbled."

== Characters ==
- Abbie Crunch: A widow living in a house on Dumble Street, in The Narrows. She is concerned with propriety and racial uplift.
- Link Williams: Abbie's adopted son, twenty-six years old during the novel's present-day action. Link majored in history at Dartmouth but has worked in The Last Chance (a bar in The Narrows) since graduation, much to Abbie's disappointment.
- Malcolm Powther: Abbie's boarder, also the butler at the Treadway estate. He is a neat, little man who knows his wife's affairs but does not confront her.
- Theodore "The Major" Crunch: Abbie's deceased husband, who passed when Link was 8 years old, assumedly due to a stroke. Originating from South Carolina, he claims to come from "swamp niggers."
- Frances "F.K." Jackson: Abbie's best friend and the mortician in Monmouth. She is primarily an antagonist to Link, though wants the best for him. Like Abbie, she is not married.
- Mamie Powther: Malcolm's wife, a buxom woman who sings the blues. Abbie disapproves of her.
- J.C. Powther: Malcolm and Mamie's youngest son, who spends his days pestering Abbie.
- Bill Hod: Owner of The Last Chance, as well as other bars and brothels in The Narrows. He is Mamie's lover and something of a surrogate father to Link.
- Weak Knees: Bill Hod's friend and the cook at The Last Chance. Somewhat of an uncle to Link, he often gives life advice and moral direction at hard points in Link's life.
- Camilla (“Camilo Williams”) Treadway Sheffield: Link's white lover, only heir to the Treadway estate. She is married to Captain Bunny Sheffield and works as a fashion reporter.
- Mrs. Treadway: Owner (after her husband's death) of Treadway Munitions, the main industry in Monmouth.
- Captain “Bunny” Sheffield: Camilla's husband, Mrs. Treadway's son-in-law.
- Jubine: Photographer with socialist views. His pictures catch the poor at their most noble and the rich at their most embarrassing moments.
- Peter Bullock: Editor of the Monmouth Chronicle. He suffers from ulcers, partly because of the stress of maintaining his upper-middle-class lifestyle.

== Plot summary ==
=== Present day ===
The novel's non-flashback narrative arc occurs within the period of a few months. At the beginning of this time, the Powthers move in as Abbie Crunch's boarders on the second floor of her house. Impressed with Malcolm Powther's attitude and manner, she wrongly assumes the rest of the family behaves similarly. Upon meeting Mamie, Malcolm's wife, and their three children, she regrets her decision and is constantly bothered by the youngest child, J.C. The main action begins when Link “rescues” Camilla Treadway Sheffield (who gives her name as “Camilo Williams”) from the advances of Cat Jimmie, a disabled veteran. The two do not recognize their race differences, Link being black and Camilo being white, until later in the evening. Two weeks later, Camilo returns to the area where they met and they continue to grow closer. Link doubts that Camilo's last name is really Williams, and perceives that she has some reason to hide her true identity.

Eventually, Link and Camilo begin a clandestine affair, primarily meeting in New York. Link is deeply upset by Camilo's paying for their outings, which include theatre shows, extravagant dinners, and expensive hotels. Occasionally, they spend the night in Abbie's home in the Narrows. On one of these occasions, Abbie finds the two in bed together and angrily throws Camilo out of the house. In her anger, Camilo uses racially insulting language that causes Link to react violently. He slaps her, driving Camilo off and ending their affair. Link finds out, when Bill Hod leaves an old newspaper around for him to see, that Camilo is really Camilla Treadway Sheffield; in other words, not only is she white, but she is also rich and married. Link fears that Camilo is merely repeating a pattern from the days of slavery: “I bid two hundred; look at his teeth, make it three hundred; look at his muscle, look at his back; the lady says one thousand dollars. Sold to the lady for a thousand dollars. Plantation buck. Stud.”

Meanwhile, Malcolm Powther and the other staff at the Treadway estate begin to suspect that Camilla has another lover when Al, the chauffeur, repeatedly sees her coming home at late hours of the morning. A cuckold himself, Powther internally sympathizes with the captain. As time goes on, he grows increasingly paranoid about Mamie leaving him and the children for Bill Hod and begins to wrongly suspect that Mamie is involved with Link as well.

After a month, Camilla attempts to restart the affair, but she is convinced that Link must be seeing another woman when he denies her advances. In revenge, she screams and tears her clothing, accusing him of attempted rape when the police arrive. There is little circumstantial evidence for her accusation, and, in the intervening time before the trial, Camilla begins drinking too much. One day, while driving intoxicated, she hits a child with her car (thereby destroying what credibility she might have had in court). Her mother, Mrs. Treadway, bribes Peter Bullock to keep the story out of the newspaper. Jubine, however, has photos of both Camilla and Link published in a New York tabloid, sensationalizing the story and creating doubt throughout Monmouth about the validity of the accusations against Link. In an attempt to salvage Camilla's reputation, Captain Sheffield and Mrs. Treadway kidnap Link and try to force him to sign a confession. When he instead “confesses” that he and Camilla were in love, Captain Sheffield shoots and kills him.

In the aftermath of Link's murder, Mrs. Treadway and Captain Sheffield are arrested. Abbie, however, realizes that Bill Hod will not rest until Camilla has paid for her part in Link's death. At the novel's end, she resolves to go to the police, tell them of her suspicions, and end the chain of violence. She takes J.C. Powther along with her, symbolizing her “adoption” of him and her resolve to care for him as she had failed to do for Link.

=== Flashback ===
Though the novel is arranged in chronological order, most of the story takes place via flashback before the present day.

Link is adopted at 6 years old by The Major and Abbie Crunch, at The Major's insistence. When Link is eight years old, the Major returns from the Last Chance saloon smelling of whiskey and leaning on Bill Hod. Bill tells Abbie that The Major is unwell, but she refuses to take action. She believes he is drunk, and is concerned for their reputation in the community. Bill Hod leaves, furious at her inaction. Coming over for dinner, F.K. Jackson sees the condition of The Major and believes he has had a stroke. He dies a few days later, leaving Abbie alone with Link.

Consumed by grief, Abbie sinks deep within herself and completely neglects Link. Hungry and confused, he solicits food from Weak Knees and Bill Hod. Weak and Bill become mentors for Link, who lives in the back of The Last Chance for three months until Abbie demands he return home. As his relationship with the two men grows stronger, there is often conflict in ideologies between Bill Hod and Abbie Crunch. Bill teaches Link a Black is beautiful style of thinking, which differs from Abbie's internalized racial shame.

The summer Link is 16, he is eager for a sexual experience, but has worked too hard for Bill Hod to court girls his age. Also under pressure from Abbie Crunch and F.K. Jackson, he secretly visits "China's Place," a brothel unknowingly owned by Bill Hod. China calls Bill, who demands that Link stay away from the establishment. He returns some time later, but is again foiled by Bill. This time, Bill beats him brutally for his actions. Thirsty for revenge, Link takes Bill's gun and enters his office with the intention of killing the older man, but is shaking too violently to take action. Bill runs Link off, who spends the rest of the summer hauling ice and trying to work up the nerve to try again at killing Bill. After bumping into Weak Knees accidentally, Link reconciles with Bill and returns to the bar. Ever since, however, the two have maintained a "silent war" between them.

Links enrolls for college at Dartmouth. Encouraged by a former teacher, he chose to major in history. Abbie is upset, asking him "Whoever heard of a colored historian?" In spite of her negative outlook, he graduates as a member of Phi Beta Kappa and is given a car by Bill Hod as a graduation gift. Two months after graduation, Link enlists for four years in the Navy before returning home to Dumble Street. Secretly, he works on a history of slavery in the United States, but works as a day man in the Last Chance to make ends meet. The non-flashback part of the novel begins soon after.

== Critical reception ==
The Narrows is generally considered to be of high literary merit. Though financially successful—Margaret B. McDowell notes that The Narrows “has sold over a million copies”—the novel did not receive the same sustained critical attention as Petry’s debut, The Street. Critics have, however, emphasized its ambition and craft: Sybil Weir argues that the novel “reveals the maturing of Petry’s literary vision” and calls for its revaluation.

=== Characters ===
The novel devotes extensive narration to the interior thoughts and emotions of its characters. In his analysis of The Narrows, Critic Ivan Taylor writes, "Almost every one of them is a living vibrant character that one has met at some time or other on Dixwell Avenue in Hew Haven or 116 Street in New York or on the thousand and one Catfish Rows of Negro America."

=== Classification ===
Scholars have examined the novel's classification as a New England work, rather than exclusively an African American one. According to critic Sybil Weir, "The Narrows belongs to the tradition of domestic feminism and realism created primarily by New England women writers."

One academic conference paper compares Petry’s The Narrows (1953), set in Connecticut, with Ralph Waldo Ellison's Invisible Man (1952), focusing on Black masculinity and (in)visibility; Ellison’s novel opens in the U.S. South before moving to Harlem, New York City, situating both works largely in the American Northeast.
