= Saybrook Manor, Connecticut =

Census-designated place in Connecticut, United States

- Census-designated place
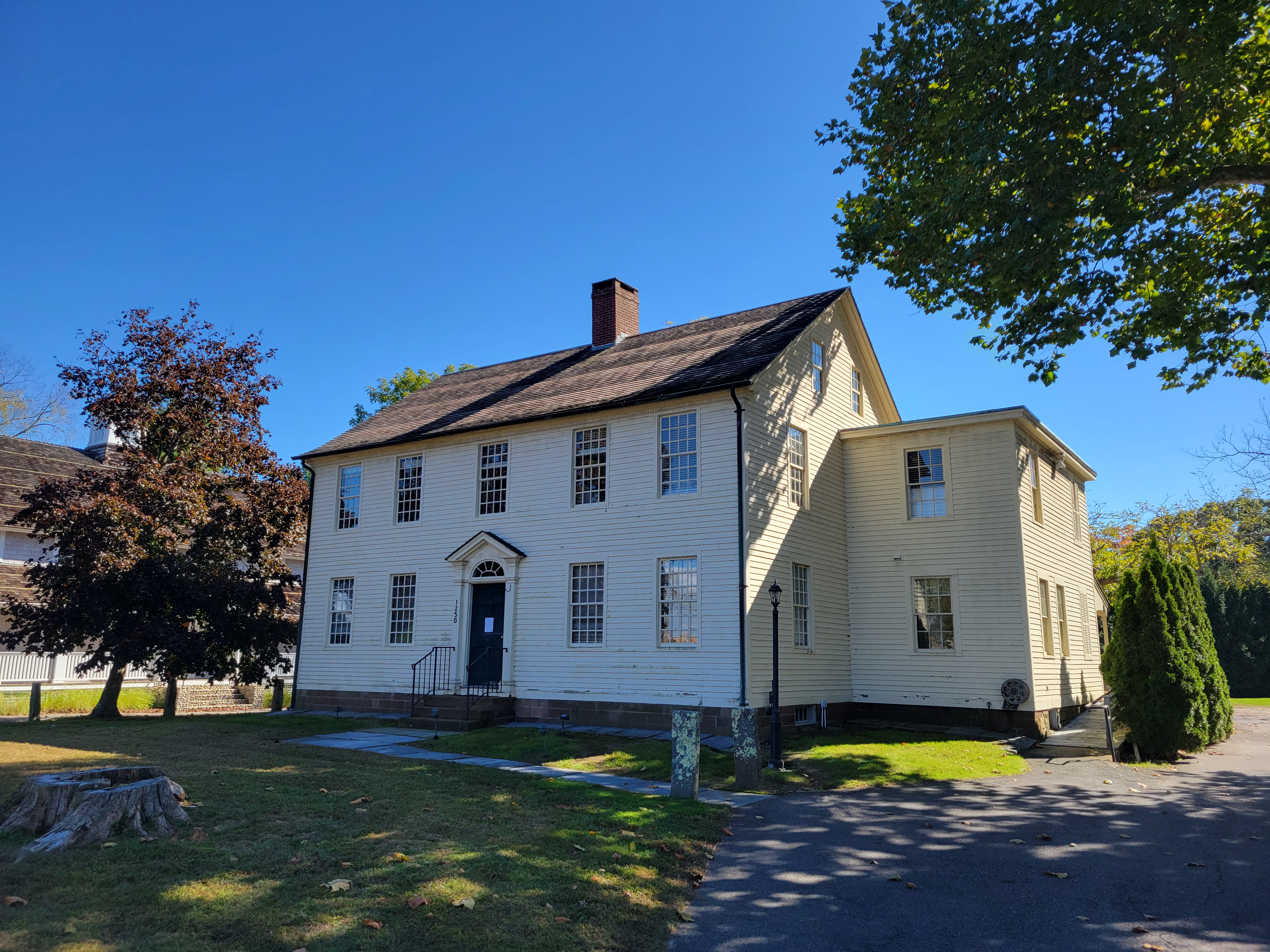
- George Henry Chapman House

- Location within Connecticut Location within the United States
- Coordinates: 41°17′6″N 72°23′57″W
- Country: United States
- State: Connecticut
- County: Middlesex
- Town: Portland

Area
  - Total: 0.97 sq mi (2.5 km^{2})
  - Land: 0.77 sq mi (2.0 km^{2})
  - Water: 0.20 sq mi (0.52 km^{2})
- Elevation: 12 ft (3.7 m)

Population (2020)
  - Total: 1,172
  - Density: 3,932/sq mi (1,518.1/km^{2})
- Time zone: UTC-5 (Eastern (EST))
  - Summer (DST): UTC-4 (EDT)
- ZIP Code: 06475 (Old Saybrook)
- Area codes: 860/959
- FIPS code: 09-67050
- GNIS feature ID: 2377859

Saybrook Manor is a community and census-designated place (CDP) in Old Saybrook, a town in Middlesex County, Connecticut, United States. The population was 1,127 at the 2020 census. The Saybrook Manor section is generally the area south of U.S. Route 1 between the Westbrook town line and the Oyster River.

== Geography ==
Saybrook Manor is in southeastern Middlesex County, in the southwest part of the town of Old Saybrook. Via U.S. Route 1, it is 1 mile (1.6 km) west of Old Saybrook Center and 2 miles (3 km) east of Westbrook Center. It is bordered to the south by Long Island Sound.

According to the United States Census Bureau, the Saybrook Manor CDP has a total area of 1.0 square mile (2.6 km^{2}), of which 0.8 square miles (2.1 km^{2}) are land and 0.2 square miles (0.5 km^{2}), or 19.79%, are water.

== Demographics ==
=== 2020 census ===
As of the 2020 census, Saybrook Manor had a population of 1,172. The median age was 57.7 years. 12.0% of residents were under the age of 18 and 34.9% of residents were 65 years of age or older. For every 100 females there were 86.9 males, and for every 100 females age 18 and over there were 82.8 males age 18 and over.

100.0% of residents lived in urban areas, while 0.0% lived in rural areas.

There were 554 households in Saybrook Manor, of which 17.0% had children under the age of 18 living in them. Of all households, 44.2% were married-couple households, 17.3% were households with a male householder and no spouse or partner present, and 32.5% were households with a female householder and no spouse or partner present. About 38.8% of all households were made up of individuals and 21.7% had someone living alone who was 65 years of age or older.

There were 1,051 housing units, of which 47.3% were vacant. The homeowner vacancy rate was 1.9% and the rental vacancy rate was 4.7%.

Racial composition as of the 2020 census
| Race | Number | Percent |
|---|---|---|
| White | 1,066 | 91.0% |
| Black or African American | 3 | 0.3% |
| American Indian and Alaska Native | 0 | 0.0% |
| Asian | 16 | 1.4% |
| Native Hawaiian and Other Pacific Islander | 0 | 0.0% |
| Some other race | 27 | 2.3% |
| Two or more races | 60 | 5.1% |
| Hispanic or Latino (of any race) | 70 | 6.0% |

=== 2000 census ===
As of the census of 2000, there were 1,133 people, 522 households, and 328 families residing in the CDP. The population density was 1,497.7 inhabitants per square mile (578.3/km^{2}). There were 1,027 housing units at an average density of 1,357.5 per square mile (524.1/km^{2}). The racial makeup of the CDP was 96.12% White, 0.35% African American, 2.74% Asian, 0.26% from other races, and 0.53% from two or more races. Hispanic or Latino of any race were 0.79% of the population.

There were 522 households, out of which 18.4% had children under the age of 18 living with them, 52.3% were married couples living together, 6.5% had a female householder with no husband present, and 37.0% were non-families. 30.3% of all households were made up of individuals, and 14.0% had someone living alone who was 65 years of age or older. The average household size was 2.17 and the average family size was 2.69.

In the CDP, the population was spread out, with 17.5% under the age of 18, 3.7% from 18 to 24, 27.1% from 25 to 44, 28.9% from 45 to 64, and 22.8% who were 65 years of age or older. The median age was 46 years. For every 100 females, there were 97.4 males. For every 100 females age 18 and over, there were 98.1 males.

The median income for a household in the CDP was $54,489, and the median income for a family was $73. Males had a median income of $40,221 versus $37,938 for females. The per capita income for the CDP was $30,511. About 3.7% of families and 7.4% of the population were below the poverty line, including 15.7% of those under age 18 and none of those age 65 or over.
