= Humphrey Pratt Tavern =

- U.S. National Register of Historic Places
- U.S. Historic district – Contributing property
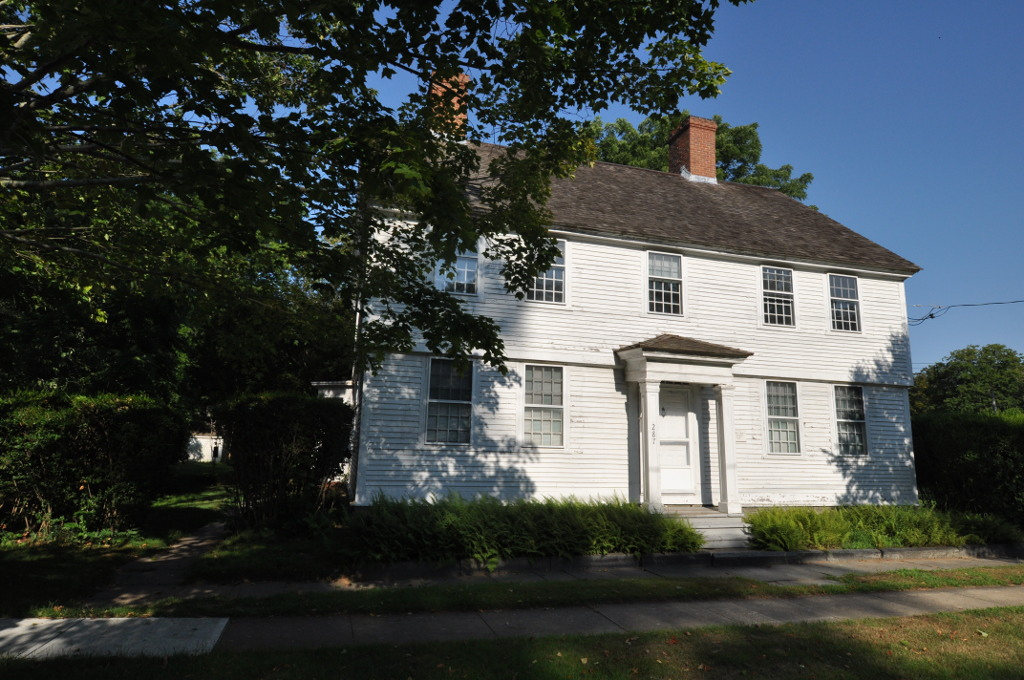

- Location within Connecticut Location within the United States
- Location: 287 Main Street, Old Saybrook, Connecticut
- Coordinates: 41°17′18″N 72°22′35″W
- Area: 2 acres (0.81 ha)
- Built: 1785
- Part of: Old Saybrook South Green (ID76001984)
- NRHP reference No.: 72001320

Significant dates
- Added to NRHP: November 7, 1972
- Designated CP: September 3, 1976

The Humphrey Pratt Tavern is a historic house at 287 Main Street in Old Saybrook, Connecticut. Built in 1785, it was associated with the locally prominent Pratt family for many years, and served as a tavern and stagecoach stop in the 18th and 19th centuries. It was listed on the National Register of Historic Places in 1976.

== Description and history ==
The Humphrey Pratt Tavern is located in Old Saybrook's central South Green area, on the west side of Main Street southwest of its junction with the Old Boston Post Road. It consists of a main block, 2 1/2 stories in height, five bays wide, with end chimneys, and a 2 1/2-story gambrel-roofed ell extending to the rear. It is finished in wooden clapboards, and has a symmetrical facade with a slightly overhanging second story. The main entrance is at the center, sheltered by a Greek Revival hip-roofed portico supported by square columns with modest capitals. The interior follows a central hall plan, and is extended by a two-story addition to the rear and a single-story ell to the side.

The house was built in 1785 by Humphrey Pratt, and it remained in the Pratt family until 1943. Pratt was Old Saybrook's first postmaster, operating the town's post office on these premises. It was a popular meeting place, given its central location in the town, and on the main stagecoach route between Boston and New York City. The rear addition has a ballroom with sprung wooden floor on the second floor, where the Marquis de Lafayette is said to have danced.

== See also ==
- National Register of Historic Places listings in Middlesex County, Connecticut
