= John Whittlesey Jr. House =

Historic house in Connecticut, United States

- U.S. National Register of Historic Places
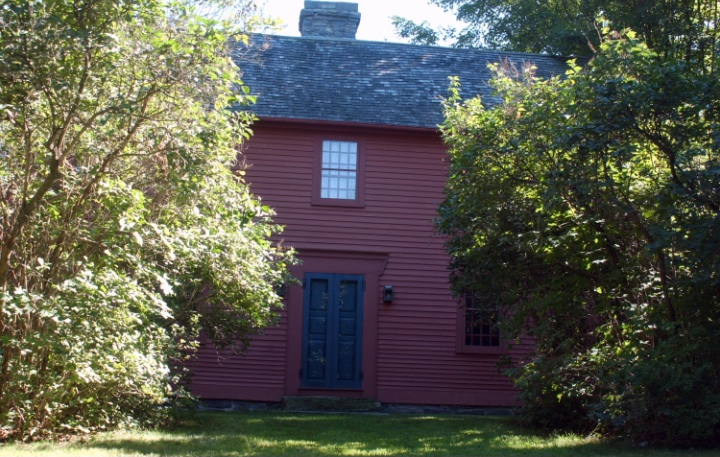

- Location within Connecticut Location within the United States
- Location: 40 Ferry Road, Old Saybrook, Connecticut
- Coordinates: 41°18′49″N 72°21′33″W
- Area: 3 acres (1.2 ha)
- Built: c. 1693
- Architect: Whittlesey, John Jr.
- Architectural style: Georgian
- NRHP reference No.: 84002644
- Added to NRHP: October 26, 1984

The John Whittlesey Jr. House is a historic house at 40 Ferry Road in Old Saybrook, Connecticut. With a construction history estimated to date to the 1690s, it includes in its structure one of Connecticut's oldest surviving buildings. It was listed on the National Register of Historic Places in 1984.

== Description and history ==
The John Whittlesey Jr. House is located in northeastern Old Saybrook, on the south side of Ferry Road. It is set back from the street on a lot lined at the street by a low stone retaining wall. The house is a 2 1/2-story wood-frame structure, five bays wide, with a large central chimney, gabled roof, and clapboarded exterior. An older 2 1/2-story ell projects to the rear, while a more recent one extends to one side. The interior of the house is well preserved despite extensive remodelling in the 20th century. It has original doors and door hardware, including latches and strap hinges of wrought iron. The narrow entry hall includes a winding staircase with original handrail, balustrade, and newel post. In the older rear ell, the heavy post and beam framing is exposed in many places.

The main block of the house was built c. 1750, but its rear ell is much older, with an estimated construction date of 1693. John Whittlesey was part of the locally prominent family that maintained the nearby ferry landing on the Connecticut River and operated the ferry. The house was considered by the eccentric Hartford resident William B. Goodwin to become a part of a reconstruction of Fort Saybrook in the early 20th century.

The house is similar to the Buckingham-Hall House, which formerly stood nearby, but is now located at Mystic Seaport, 25 to 30 miles away. Both buildings include re-used older structures; it is believed that there was a "a strong local tradition or sentiment" in favor of such re-use.

== See also ==
- List of the oldest buildings in Connecticut
- Jedidiah Dudley House, also NRHP-listed nearby, also possibly known as John Wittlesey Jr. House
- Ambrose Whittlesey House, 14 Main Street, Old Saybrook, also NRHP-listed, home of a descendant
- National Register of Historic Places listings in Middlesex County, Connecticut
