= Ambrose Whittlesey House =

Historic house in Connecticut, United States

- U.S. National Register of Historic Places
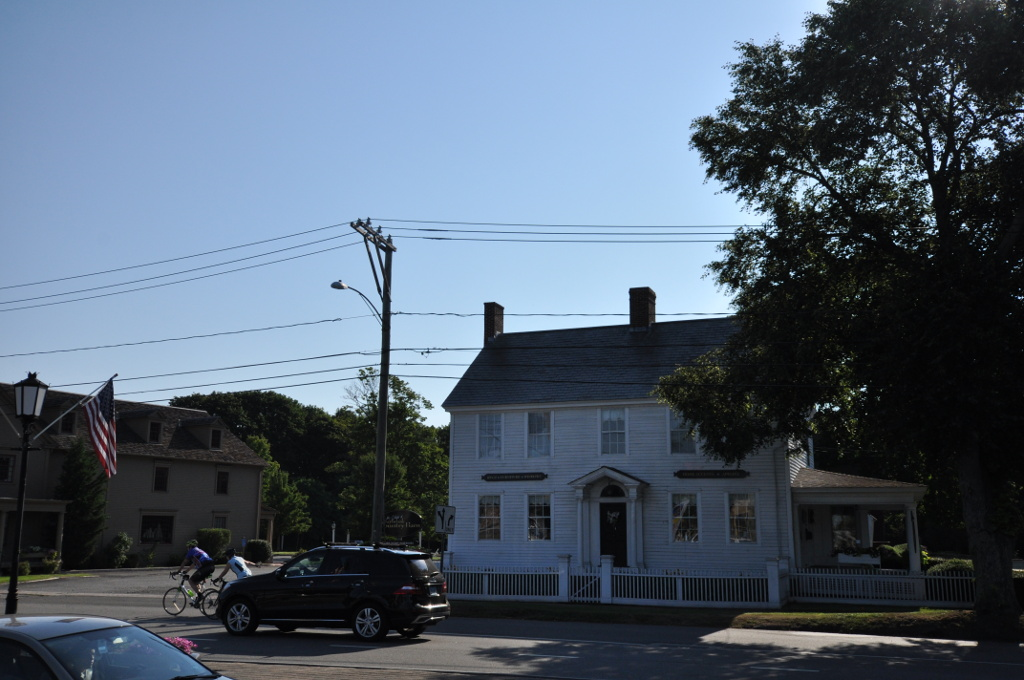

- Location within Connecticut Location within the United States
- Location: 14 Main Street, Old Saybrook, Connecticut
- Coordinates: 41°17′51″N 72°22′37″W
- Area: 0.7 acres (0.28 ha)
- Built: 1765 and c. 1800
- Architectural style: Georgian and Federal
- NRHP reference No.: 85001830
- Added to NRHP: August 23, 1985

The Ambrose Whittlesey House is a historic house at 2 Main Street in Old Saybrook, Connecticut that was listed on the National Register of Historic Places in 1985.

The house was built in two sections. The first section was one story high, built in 1765, measuring 16 feet (4.9 m) by 30 feet (9.1 m). This is now at the rear of the house. Around 1800, a two-story main block measuring 30 feet (9.1 m) by 34 feet (10 m) was added. The main block has a relatively plain facade, but it has a Georgian style portico to accent it. The columns holding up the portico are consistent with Georgian proportions, but the fanlight over the door is more related to Federal architecture in style and design. The interior of the 1800 section of the house is generally consistent with Federal-style architecture. This section contains a massive center chimney, dating back to Colonial architecture in its simplicity. The chimney contains flues for six hearths, three on each floor.

The house has architectural influences indicating a transition between Georgian architecture and Federal architecture. There are only a few such buildings remaining in this section of Old Saybrook. The actual identification of architectural styles is complicated by the mix of elements such as the large central chimney, reminiscent of colonial-period architecture; the Georgian-style portico, and the Federal-style detailing in the interior. Since there are few other Georgian-style details in the house, it appears likely that the portico was added later.

The owner, Ambrose Whittlesey, was the great-great-grandson of John Whittlesey, who was an early settler of the Saybrook Colony in the 17th century. The Whittlesey family was involved in farming, the merchandise trade, and shipbuilding. Ambrose started his career as a sea captain at age 21, trading with the West Indies. He later went on to voyages to Spain and Portugal after the War of 1812. When he died in 1827, his house was inherited by his youngest son, also named Ambrose, although his mother had an encumbrance on the property until her death in 1838. In 1839, his surviving siblings granted him full ownership via a quitclaim deed. The house remained in the Whittlesey family until 1967.

== See also ==
- John Whittlesey Jr. House, also NRHP-listed, in Old Saybrook
- National Register of Historic Places listings in Middlesex County, Connecticut
