= Ann Petry =

American writer (1908–1997)

Ann Lane Petry
- Born: Ann Lane Petry; October 12, 1908; Old Saybrook, Connecticut, U.S.
- Died: April 28, 1997 (aged 88); Old Saybrook, Connecticut, U.S.
- Education: Connecticut College of Pharmacy
- Occupation: Writer
- Spouse: George Petry
- Children: Liz Petry
- Writing career
- Pen name: Arnold Petri
- Language: English
- Years active: 1946–71
- Notable works: The Street (1946); The Narrows (1953)

Ann Petry (October 12, 1908 – April 28, 1997) was an American writer of novels, short stories, children's books and journalism. Her 1946 debut novel The Street became the first novel by an African-American woman to sell more than a million copies.

In 2019, the Library of America published a volume of her work containing The Street as well as her 1953 masterpiece The Narrows and a few shorter pieces of nonfiction.

== Early life ==
Ann, born Anna Houston Lane, was born in Old Saybrook, Connecticut. She was the youngest of three daughters to Peter Clark Lane and Bertha James Lane. Her parents belonged to the black minority, numbering 15 inhabitants of the small town. Her father was a pharmacist and her mother was a shop owner, chiropodist, and hairdresser. Ann was also the niece of Anna Louise James.

Ann and her sister were raised "in the classic New England tradition: a study in efficiency, thrift, and utility (…) They were filled with ambitions that they might not have entertained had they lived in a city along with thousands of poor blacks stuck in demeaning jobs." In 1925, Ann graduated from high school as the only person of Afro-American descent.

The family had none of the trappings of the middle class until Petry was well into adulthood. Before her mother became a businesswoman, she worked in a factory, and her sisters worked as maids. The Lane girls were raised sheltered from most of the disadvantages that other black people in the United States had to experience due to the color of their skin; however, there were a number of incidents of racial discrimination.

As Petry wrote in "My Most Humiliating Jim Crow Experience", published in Negro Digest in 1946, there was an incident where a racist decided they did not want her on a beach. In an autobiographical essay published in 1988, she would also write of children jeering and throwing stones at her and her sister on their way home after their first day of school. Her short story "Doby's Gone" (first published in Phylon [4th qtr, 1944, v.5,n.4], and included in her later short-story collection Miss Muriel and Other Stories [1971]) was loosely inspired by this experience. She would write "this story is in a way another expression of the outrage that has stayed with me all these years. To paraphrase a sentence from one of James Baldwin's great essays, this sense of outrage stayed with me 'indivisible from me forever, part of the passion that drives'." Her father wrote a letter to The Crisis in 1920 or 1921 complaining about a teacher who refused to teach his daughters and his niece. Another teacher humiliated her by making her read the part of Jupiter, the illiterate ex-slave in the Edgar Allan Poe short story "The Gold-Bug".

Petry had a strong family foundation with well-traveled uncles, who had many stories to tell her when coming home; her father, who overcame racial obstacles, opened a pharmacy in the small town; and her mother and aunts set a strong example: Petry, interviewed by The Washington Post in 1992, says about her tough female family members that "it never occurred to them that there were things they couldn't do because they were women."

== Career ==
Petry's desire to become a professional writer was raised first in high school when her English teacher read her essay to the class and commented on it with the words: "I honestly believe that you could be a writer if you wanted to." The decision to become a pharmacist was her family's. After graduating in 1929 from Old Saybrook High School, she went to college and graduated with a Ph.G. degree from the University of Connecticut College of Pharmacy in New Haven in 1931 and worked in the family business for several years, while also writing short stories. On February 22, 1938, she married George D. Petry of New Iberia, Louisiana, and moved to New York. Between 1943 and 1941, she worked as a journalist and advertising representative at the The Amsterdam News. She then moved to Adam Clayton Powell Jr.'s newly established newspaper, The People's Voice from 1941 ro 1944 as a reporter and editor of the women's page. In 1943, she would begin to write a weekly column for the paper called "The Lighter Side". From 1942 to 1944, Petry studied creative writing at Columbia University under Mabel Louise Robinson. She would dedicate her third novel, The Narrows (1953) to Robinson. Throughout this period, Petry published short stories in The Crisis, Phylon, Opportunity, and other outlets.

Petry was active in her local community: she took part in American Negro Theatre productions held at the Schomburg Center for Research in Black Culture (1940) including a performance of On Striver's Row; studied art at the Harlem Art Center (1941); co-founded Negro Women, Inc., a women's advocacy group that organised around consumer protections with Dollie Lowther Robinson (1942); worked at an after-school program at P.S. 10 in Harlem; taught a course for the NAACP; and worked briefly on a sociological study for the New York Foundation. Petry performed alongside Ruby Dee in On Striver's Row. The founding document of the Negro Women, Inc. described it as "a Harlem consumer's watch group that provide[d] working class women with 'how-to' information for purchasing food, clothing, and furniture". More than just providing information, the group held events and activities for Black women that encouraged them to see themselves as political agents. It was during this period that Petry experienced and understood what the majority of the black population of the United States had to go through in their everyday life. Traversing the Harlem streets, living for the first time among large numbers of poor black people, seeing neglected children up close—Petry's early years in New York inevitably made impressions on her and led her to put her experiences to paper. Her daughter Liz explained to The Washington Post that "her way of dealing with the problem was to write this book (The Street), which maybe was something that people who had grown up in Harlem couldn't do."

After the publication of Petry's short story “On Saturday the Siren Sounds at Noon” in the December 1943 issue of The Crisis, the story caught the notice of editors at Houghton Mifflin. They encouraged Petry to apply for the publisher's Literary Fellowship Award, which she went on to win in 1945. Petry featured in a brief All-American News film segment as a result. The award came with a $2,400 stipend and this allowed her to write and publish her first and most popular novel, The Street, in 1946. The book sold more than one million copies, immediately making Petry a household name. In the same year, her short story "Like a Winding Sheet" (first published in The Crisis) was included in The Best American Short Stories 1946 and its editor, Martha Foley, dedicates the anthology to Petry.

Back in Old Saybrook in 1947, Petry worked on Country Place (1947), The Narrows (1953), other stories, and books for children, but they never achieved the same success as her first book. She drew on her personal experiences of the hurricane in Old Saybrook in Country Place. Although the novel is set in the immediate aftermath of World War II, Petry identified the 1938 New England hurricane as the source for the storm that is at the center of her narrative. One of her most impactful books was Harriet Tubman, an outstanding biography on the life of the most famous conductor of the Underground Railroad.

Petry also lectured at University of California, Berkeley, Miami University and Suffolk University, and was Visiting Professor of English at the University of Hawai'i at Mānoa.

Petry died in Old Saybrook at the age of 88 on April 28, 1997. She was outlived by her husband George, who died in 2000, and her only daughter, Liz Petry.

In November 2018, Tayari Jones called for a revival of Petry's acclaim, writing that Petry "is the writer we have been waiting for, hers are the stories we need to fully illuminate the questions of our moment, while also offering a page-turning good time." In her home state of Connecticut, poet and activist, Jose B. Gonzalez has also led a movement to get Petry more recognition.

== Selected bibliography ==
- "Marie of the Cabin Club" (short story), Baltimore Afro-American, 1939. Originally published under the pseudonym Arnold Petri.
- The Street (novel), Boston: Houghton Mifflin, 1946; New York: Pyramid, 1961; Boston: Beacon Press, 1985; London: Michael Joseph, 1947; Ace Books, 1958; Virago, 1988.
- Country Place (novel), Boston: Houghton Mifflin, 1947; London: Michael Joseph, 1948; Chatham, New Jersey: Chatham Bookseller, 1971. Evanston: Northwestern University Press, 2019.
- The Drugstore Cat (for children; illus. Susanne Suba), New York: Crowell, 1949; Boston: Beacon, 1988.
- The Narrows (novel), Boston: Houghton Mifflin, 1953. Evanston: Northwestern University Press, 2017.
- Tituba of Salem Village (historical novel for children), 1955, New York: Crowell, 1964; Harper trophy, 1991.
- Harriet Tubman: Conductor On The Underground Railroad (non-fiction), New York: Crowell, 1955; as The Girl Called Moses: The Story of Harriet Tubman, London: Methuen, 1960.
- Legends of the Saints (illus. Anne Rockwell), New York: Crowell, 1970.
- Miss Muriel and Other Stories (story collection), Boston: Houghton Mifflin, 1971. Evanston: Northwestern University Press, 2017.
- In Darkness and Confusion (short story), published in 1947.
