= Old Saybrook South Green =

- U.S. National Register of Historic Places
- U.S. Historic district
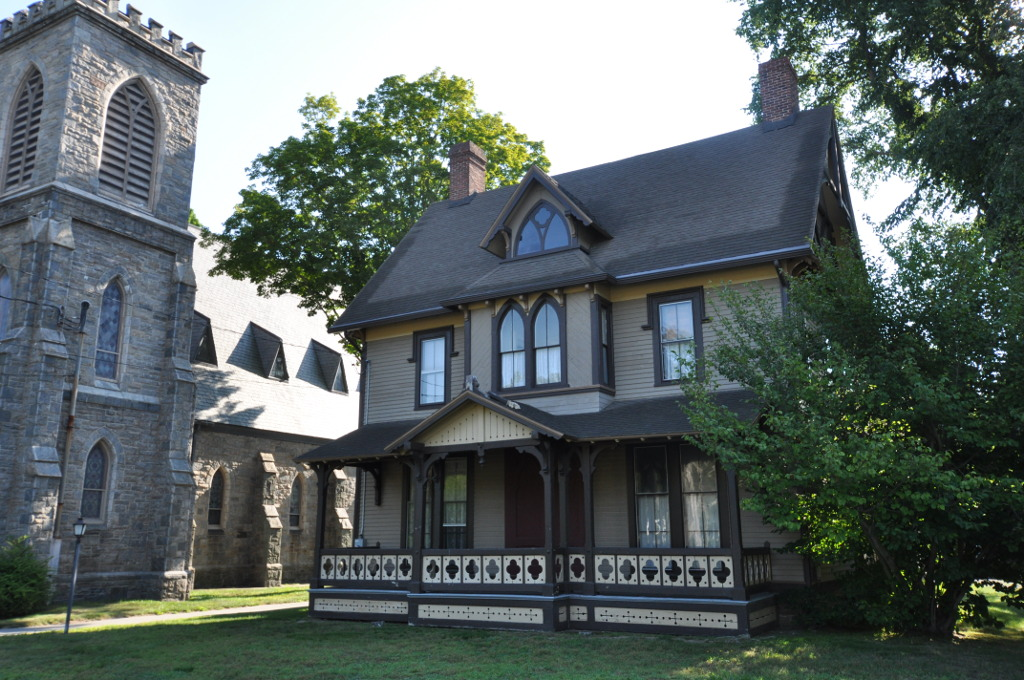

- Location within Connecticut Location within the United States
- Location: Old Boston Post Road, Pennywise Lane, Main Street, Old Saybrook, Connecticut
- Coordinates: 41°17′17″N 72°22′36″W
- Area: 20 acres (8.1 ha)
- Architect: Multiple
- Architectural style: Mid 19th Century Revival, Early Republic, and Colonial
- NRHP reference No.: 76001984
- Added to NRHP: September 3, 1976

The Old Saybrook South Green is a 20-acre (8.1 ha) historic district that encompasses the historic town green and nearby streets in Old Saybrook, Connecticut. Established in the 1630s, most of the buildings arrayed around the green were built between 1760 and 1900, and reflect the prosperity of the town, which was a major port and shipbuilding center. The district was listed on the National Register of Historic Places in 1976.

== Description and history ==
Old Saybrook was founded in 1635 as the starting point of the Saybrook Colony, a Puritan English colonial settlement. It was initially limited to the Saybrook Neck, a peninsula separating North Cove from Long Island Sound on the west side of the Connecticut River. The colony flourished as a shipbuilding and maritime trade center, and its center of civic activity migrated westward to where the town center is now located, on the west side of the cove. The town green was laid out about 1760, and was soon lined with large and architecturally high-quality houses of successful businessmen and politicians. The area saw economic success into the late 19th century, and its architectural heritage reflects this.

The historic district is roughly triangular in shape, bounded by Main Street, Old Boston Post Road, and Pennywise Lane. The oldest building in the district is the c. 1767 Gen. William Hart House, which is also separately listed on the National Register. The c. 1785 Humphrey Pratt Tavern and the James Pharmacy are also individually listed on the National Register. Prominent non-residential buildings include the Gothic Revival Grace Episcopal Church (1872) and the Greek Revival Masonic Hall (c. 1830).

== See also ==
- National Register of Historic Places listings in Middlesex County, Connecticut
