= The Drugstore Cat =

1949 book by Ann Petry

- Cover of the first edition
- Author: Ann Petry
- Illustrator: Susanne Suba
- Language: English
- Genre: Children's literature
- Publisher: Thomas Y. Crowell Co.
- Publication date: 1949
- Publication place: United States
- Pages: 87
- OCLC: 1468207

The Drugstore Cat is a 1949 children's book written by Ann Petry and illustrated by Susanne Suba. In nine chapters, it tells the story of Buzzie, a Manx kitten and his struggle to learn patience and self restraint. It is aimed at readers aged six to nine.

== Synopsis ==
The protagonist of the story is Buzzie, a chubby gray kitten with a short tail. Buzzie, named for his loud purring, is taken from the barn where he was born to live in a drugstore with brother-and-sister pharmacists, the Jameses. The kitten is sensitive about his short tail and frustrated that the humans can't understand his purring language. Fortunately, Buzzie encounters two humans with whom he can communicate: young Peter and elderly Mr. Smith.

Buzzie gets into a series of predicaments, including an injury to his paw which requires a bandage. At one point, his short temper leads him to scratch a customer at the drugstore, an offense for which he is nearly sent back to the barn. Buzzie resolves to develop a "lengthier temper", and eventually redeems himself by saving the store from burglars.

== Publication ==
By 1949 Petry was already an established writer of adult fiction, but The Drugstore Cat, which was published the same year she became a mother, was her first attempt at children's literature. Unlike her previous books, the story doesn't explicitly discuss race and racism, but according to the Schomburg Center it did help to "jumpstart the tradition [of] Black-authored children's and young-adult books." The story was also unique for its contemporary setting; her three subsequent children's books would all be historical.

There is an autobiographical aspect to the story. Petry's father was the first African American to pass the Connecticut pharmaceutical exam, and her aunt was one of the first African American women to pass the exam. Petry herself completed a pharmacy degree and worked in the family drugstore for some time.

In 1988, The Drugstore Cat was reissued by Beacon Press, under its Night Lights imprint.

== Reception ==
On its release, the book was described by The New York Times as "endearing" and the Chicago Tribune called it "irresistible" and a "little gem". The Gazette and Daily praised the simple line drawn illustrations as "resembl[ing] those which a child would draw", but noted the illustrator's inconsistent portrayal of Buzzie's bandaged paw.

More recently, Althea Tait observed that her invention of phrases like a "lengthier temper" demonstrated "Petry's linguistic understanding of how the minds of children work."
