= Tituba of Salem Village =

1964 novel by Ann Petry

- First edition
- Author: Ann Petry
- Cover artist: John Wilson
- Language: English
- Genre: African-American Literature
- Publisher: Thomas Y. Crowell
- Publication date: 1964
- Publication place: United States
- Media type: Print (Hardcover and Paperback)
- Pages: 272
- ISBN: 978-0-06-440403-7 Paperback)
- OCLC: 24857720

Tituba of Salem Village is a 1964 children's novel by African-American writer Ann Petry about the 17th-century West Indian slave of the same name who was the first to be accused of practicing witchcraft during the 1692 Salem witch trials. Written for children 10 and up, it portrays Tituba as a black West Indian woman who tells stories about life in Barbados to the village girls. These stories are mingled with existing superstitions and half-remembered pagan beliefs on the part of Puritans, and the witchcraft hysteria is partly attributed to a sort of cabin fever during a particularly bitter winter. Petry's portrayal of the helplessness of women in that period, particularly slaves and indentured servants, is key to understanding her view of the Tituba legend.

== Plot summary ==
In this rendition of the Salem Witch Trials, the novel is narrated from Tituba's point of view. Tituba was an enslaved woman from the island of Barbados. She and her husband, John, worked for their Mistress Susanna Endicott until she sold them to Reverend Samuel to pay off her gambling debts. After being sold, the two embark on a journey to Bay Colony with Reverend Samuel Paris, his wife Mistress Paris, his daughter Betsey Paris, and niece Abigail Williams. While on the journey, Tituba is ambushed by a stowaway on the ship named Pim. She agrees to keep him hidden and bring him food until they reach their destination. One night, as Tituba brings Pim his food, she sees Abigail quietly running away. When they reach their destination, Pim is discovered and taken into servitude.

Once on land, the Reverend and his family, Tituba and John, resided in the Bay Colony in Boston. Samuel quickly hired John out to earn extra money. Tituba cared for Samuel's wife, Mistress Paris, who was very sickly. Tituba also cared for Betsey and Abigail. While in Boston, Paris' neighbor Samuel Conklin befriended Tituba. He was a weaver who lived close by. She became very skilled at weaving through his teachings. As the seasons changed, Tituba started reminiscing about her homeland, Barbados. When spring arrived, Tituba was searching for herbs in the forest, but she could not find the same herbs that grew in Barbados. While in the woods, she met Judah White. Judah showed her what herbs to use to help her make her tea. As she was leaving, Samuel Paris saw Tituba with Judah. He instructed her to stay away from Judah because she was a witch.

As spring went on, Tituba noticed farmers from Salem Village coming to see Samuel Paris frequently. Early in the story, Tituba overheard Samuel Paris telling Mistress Paris he would only be a minister in Boston and nowhere else. However, John learns at the tavern that the churches in Boston did not want Reverend Paris due to his invalid wife. Throughout the season, Samuel made a trip to Salem Village, and when he returned, he told the family they would be moving there soon.

When November came, the group made the journey to Salem Village. Once they arrived at their new residence, Tituba noticed two eggs on the front steps. The eggs smelled rotten, and she wondered who left them there and why. As they made their way inside the new home, they were greeted by Mary Sibley. As Samuel introduced everyone, he introduced her and John as servants instead of slaves. The family settled into the house, and Goody Sibley inquired about where they lived previously. Abigail happily answered and started reiterating the story of the Witch Glover, who was hanged for bewitching the Goodwin children in Boston.

As Tituba settled into her new environment, Abigail started making friends with the girls around town. The girls, Mary Walcott, Elizabeth Hubbard, Mercy Lewis, Elizabeth Booth, Susanna Sheldon, Anne Putnam Jr., Mary Warren, and Sarah Churchill, all started to visit the Paris home. While there, they tried to force Betsey to have a "fit." When Betsey had a fit, they believed this to be a sign of bewitching or ghosts. When Tituba intercepted their actions, they would convince her to tell them stories of Barbados.

One night, things escalated. Mary Lewis had brought a deck of tarot cards, and the girls wanted Tituba to read them. At first, she refused but then relented. She told Mary Warren her "fortune," which was that she would marry a wealthy merchant. However, Tituba lied; her actual fortune was that people would hang because of her. This sent the girls into a frenzy.

A few weeks later, Abigail and Betsey started to have fits where they would scream and run around, leading the church to say they were bewitched. This became even more widespread after Pim tried convincing Mercy Lewis to leave with him. He cut and burned her hair so she could appear as a guy. Due to this, she refused and, in an attempt to hide the truth, blamed it on the devil and an old woman. However, she confessed the truth to Tituba since Pim received hair dye from her before he left on his journey. Mercy Lewis's situation led Goody Sibley to bake a witch cake to draw out the witch responsible for the village's bewitching.

After the witch cake was baked, Tituba ran outside due to the house's smoke and inability to see. Outside, she encountered old Gammer Osburne and Goody Good. When the three returned to the house together, the girls stared at them until Abigail accused Tituba of being a witch. Then Mercy Lewis accused Goody Good of being a witch, and Mary Warren accused her aunt, Gammer Osburne, of being a witch. A few days later, the girls all started to have fits and told the church that Tituba, Goody Good, and Gammer Osburne had bewitched them. This accusation led to Samuel Paris beating a confession out of Tituba and the arrest of all three women.

All three women stood trial, and every time they were on the confession chair, the girls started having fits until the women were instructed to touch them, and they were cured. The women were charged and sent to prison. Goody Good was hanged and never gave a confession to being a witch. Gammer Osburne died in jail the same year. Tituba was jailed for over a year and worked in the kitchen during her time. After a little over a year, all accused and jailed for witchcraft were pardoned, but many had jail fees to pay. Tituba thought Reverend Samuel would pay her fees, but she was wrong. He would only pay her fees if she confessed to being a witch. Eventually, her old neighbor Samuel Conklin returned, paid her fees, and bought her. A few months later, he went back and purchased John as well.

== See also ==
- Tituba
- The Crucible
- Salem witch trials

== Critical reception ==
Breslaw, Elaine G. “Tituba’s Confession: The Multicultural Dimensions of the 1692 Salem Witch-Hunt.” Ethnohistory, vol. 44, no. 3, 1997, pp. 535–56. JSTOR, https://doi.org/10.2307/483035. Accessed 5 Nov. 2023.

Morsberger, Robert E. “The Further Transformation of Tituba.” The New England Quarterly, vol. 47, no. 3, 1974, pp. 456–58. JSTOR, https://doi.org/10.2307/364382. Accessed 5 Nov. 2023.

Rahming, Melvin B. “Phenomenology, Epistemology, Ontology, and Spirit: The Caribbean Perspective in Ann Petry’s ‘Tituba of Salem Village.’” South Central Review, vol. 20, no. 2/4, 2003, pp. 24–46. JSTOR, https://doi.org/10.2307/3189784. Accessed 4 Nov. 2023.
