= Gen. William Hart House =

Historic house in Connecticut, United States

- U.S. National Register of Historic Places
- U.S. Historic district – Contributing property
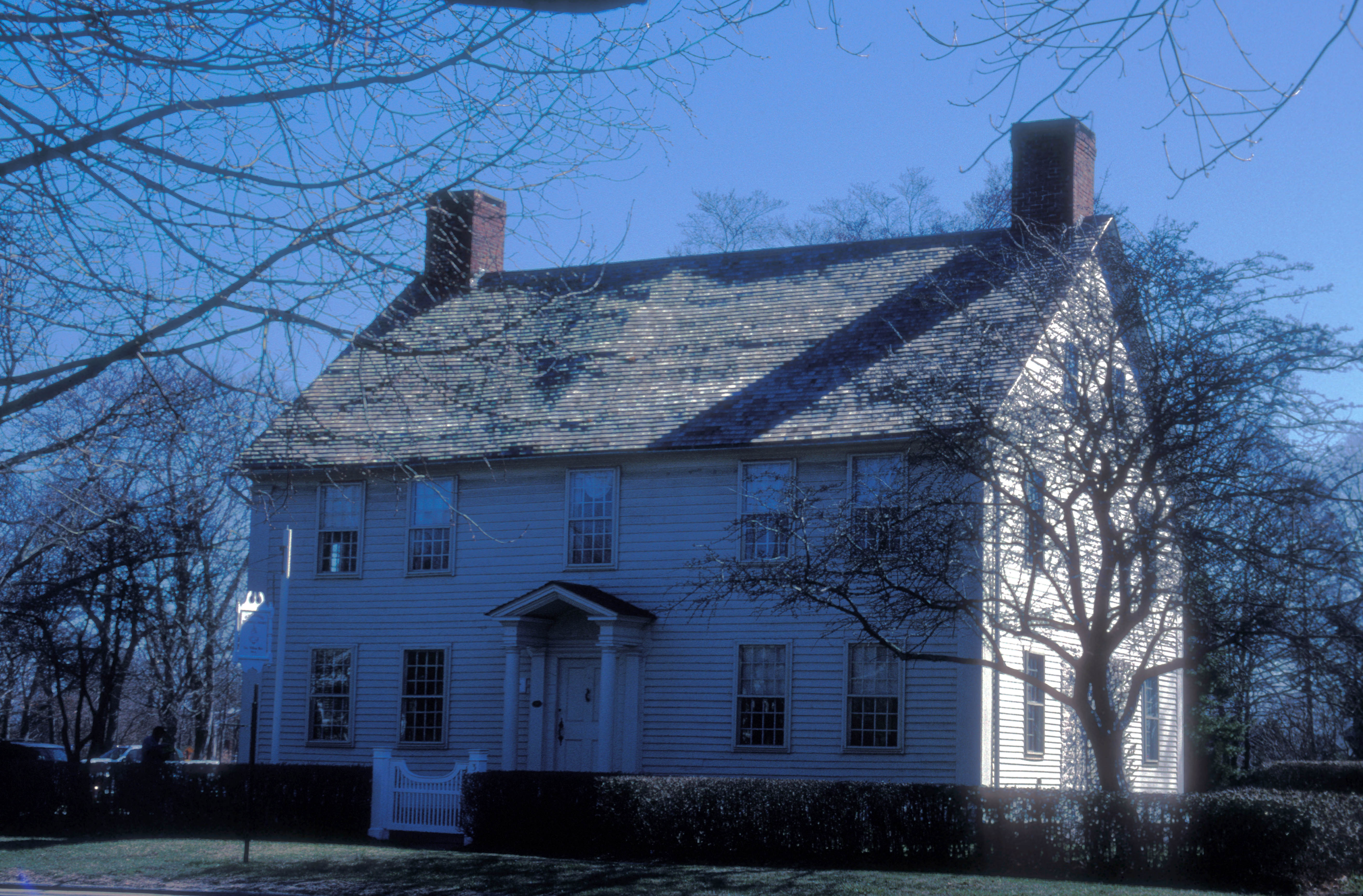

- Location within Connecticut Location within the United States
- Location: 350 Main Street, Old Saybrook, Connecticut
- Coordinates: 41°17′14″N 72°22′31″W
- Area: 1 acre (0.40 ha)
- Built: c. 1767
- Built by: William Hart, Jr.
- Architectural style: Georgian
- Part of: Old Saybrook South Green (ID76001984)
- NRHP reference No.: 72001318

Significant dates
- Added to NRHP: November 9, 1972
- Designated CP: September 3, 1976

The Gen. William Hart House is a historic house at 350 Main Street in Old Saybrook, Connecticut. Built in 1767 for a politician and colonial militia leader, it is a good example of Georgian residential architecture. The house was listed on the National Register of Historic Places in 1972, and is a contributing property to the Old Saybrook South Green historic district.

== Description and history ==
The General William Hart House stands on the east of Main Street (Connecticut Route 154) just south of the Grace Church in a residential portion of the village center of Old Saybrook. It is a 2 1/2-story wood-frame structure, five bays wide, with a gabled roof, clapboarded exterior, and two end chimneys. It has a center entry sheltered by a gable-roofed portico supported by Doric columns. The interior follows a central hall plan, and retains a number of original features, including fireplace surrounds.

The house was built in 1767 by William Hart Jr., a merchant, around the time of his marriage. Hart served in the American Revolutionary War and was later a candidate for Governor of Connecticut. The house was used later in the 19th century for a boarding school. It is one of a number of well-preserved houses from the period in the residential area south of the commercial center of Old Saybrook.

Also located on the site are the Frank Stevenson Archives and the Hart House Gardens. The house and property are currently owned by the Old Saybrook Historical Society.

== See also ==
- National Register of Historic Places listings in Middlesex County, Connecticut
