= Old Saybrook, Connecticut =

- Town
- Town of Old Saybrook
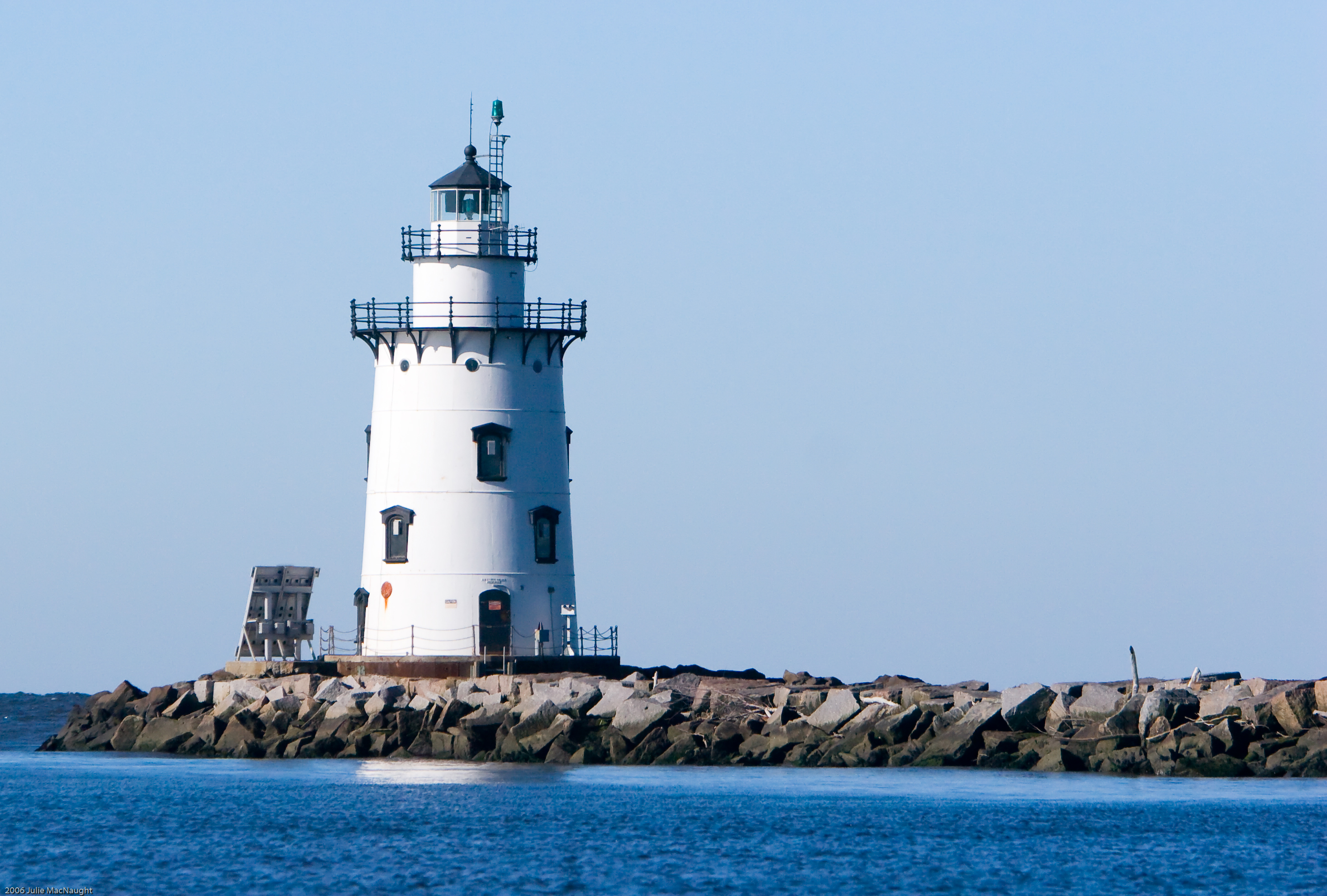
- Saybrook Breakwater Light

- Flag Seal

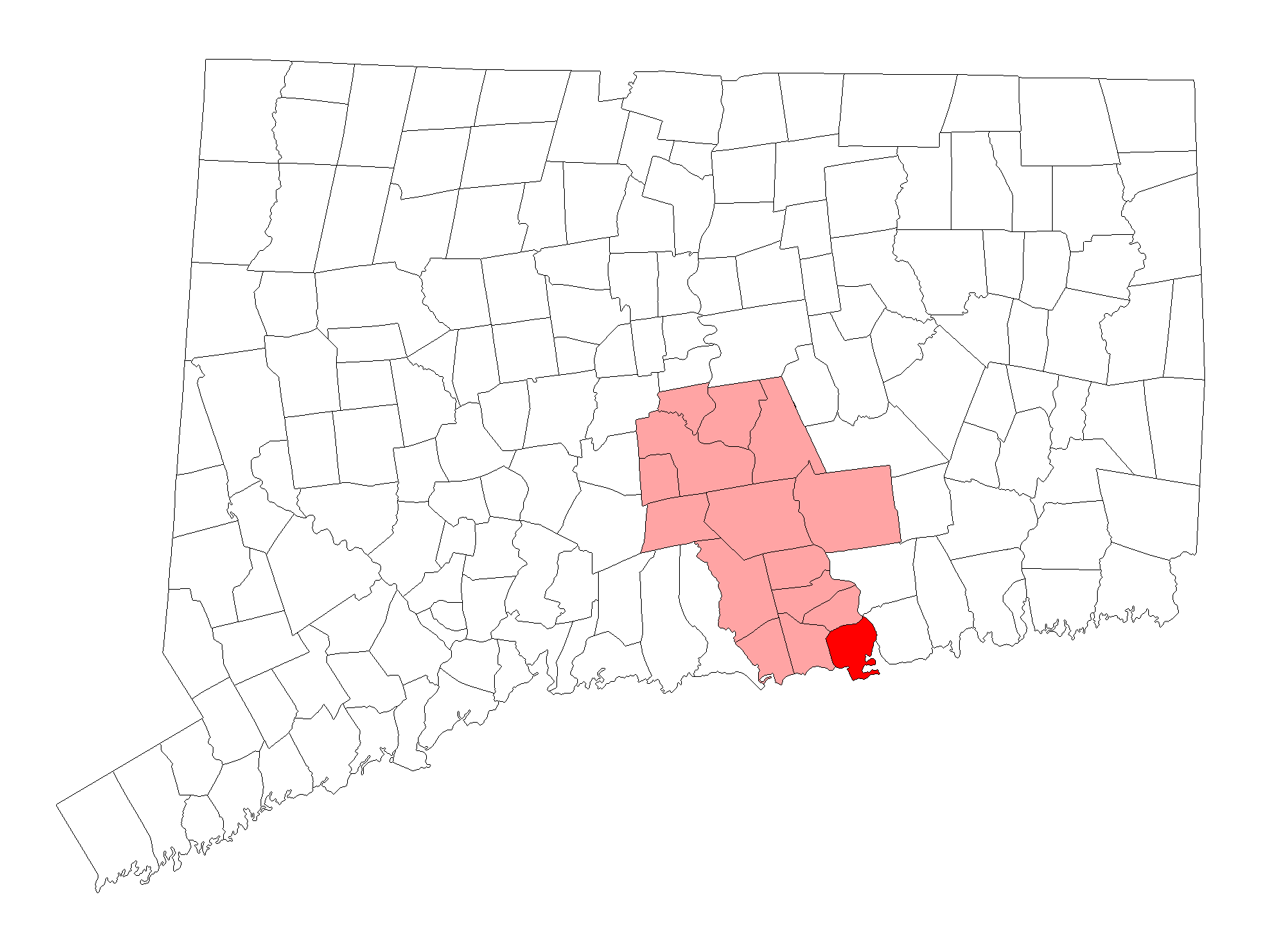
- Coordinates: 41°17′38″N 72°22′57″W
- Country: United States
- U.S. state: Connecticut
- County: Middlesex
- Region: Lower CT River Valley
- Settled: 1738
- Incorporated: 1854

Government
  - Type: Selectman-town meeting
  - First selectman: Carl P. Fortuna, Jr. (R)
  - Selectman: Scott Geigerich (R)
  - Selectman: Matt Pugliese (D)

Area
  - Total: 21.6 sq mi (55.9 km^{2})
  - Land: 15.0 sq mi (38.8 km^{2})
  - Water: 6.6 sq mi (17.0 km^{2})
- Elevation: 20 ft (6.1 m)

Population (2020)
  - Total: 10,481
  - Density: 700/sq mi (270.1/km^{2})
- Time zone: UTC−5 (Eastern)
  - Summer (DST): UTC−4 (Eastern)
- ZIP code: 06475
- Area codes: 860/959
- FIPS code: 09-57320
- GNIS feature ID: 0213484
- Website: www.oldsaybrookct.gov

Old Saybrook is a town in Middlesex County, Connecticut, lying on the west bank of the Connecticut River at the point where it flows into Long Island Sound. Part of the Lower Connecticut River Valley Planning Region, the population was 10,481 at the 2020 census. It contains the incorporated borough of Fenwick, and the census-designated places of Old Saybrook Center and Saybrook Manor.

== History ==
Dutch settlers established a short-lived factory at Old Saybrook in 1624, shortly after establishing their first settlement at Governors Island. The trading post was named Kievits Hoek, or "Plover's Corner". Kievits Hoek was soon abandoned as the Dutch consolidated settlement at New Amsterdam. In 1633, Fort Goede Hoop (Huys de Goede Hoop) was established at Hartford.

The Pequot siege of Saybrook Fort took place from September 1636 to March 1637 during the Pequot War.

In August 1636, Massachusetts Bay attacked Manisses, Pequot, and Western Niantic villages, and the Pequot retaliation fell on the settlers at Saybrook. The Pequots killed and wounded more than 20 settlers at and near Saybrook Fort over a period of eight months. The settlers were attacked when they ventured far from their palisade, and the Pequots destroyed their provisions and burned warehouses, while attempting to interrupt river traffic to Windsor, Wethersfield, and Hartford. The siege of Saybrook escalated the Pequot War in Connecticut Colony and indirectly resulted in the attack and destruction of Mistick Fort in May 1637.

The Saybrook Colony was established in late 1635 at the mouth of the Connecticut River in Old Saybrook. John Winthrop, the Younger, son of the Governor of the Massachusetts Bay Colony, was designated governor by the group that claimed possession of the land via a deed of conveyance from Robert Rich, 2nd Earl of Warwick. Winthrop was aided by Colonel George Fenwick and Captain Lion Gardiner. The new colony struggled because the investors who had planned to settle there were supporters of Oliver Cromwell, and they remained in England during the English Civil War. In 1644, Fenwick agreed to merge the colony with the more vibrant Connecticut Colony up the Connecticut River near Hartford, and they purchased the land and fort from him.

The design of the Flag of Connecticut comes from the seal of Saybrook Colony. The seal was brought from England by Colonel George Fenwick, and depicted 15 grapevines and a hand in the upper left corner with a scroll reading "Qui Transtulit Sustinet", "He who transplanted sustains".

In 1647, Major John Mason assumed command of the fort at Saybrook Colony, which controlled the main trade and supply route to the upper Connecticut River valley. The fort promptly and mysteriously burned to the ground, but another improved fort was quickly built nearby on the Battery Mound. He spent the next 12 years there and also served as commissioner of the United Colonies, the chief military officer, magistrate, and peacekeeper. In 1659, almost all settlers from Saybrook under the leadership of Mason purchased land from Uncas, sachem of the Mohegan tribe; they then moved to and founded Norwich, Connecticut. This second fort was abandoned after 200 years and the battery mound remained until 1871, when the Valley Railroad leveled it and other hills on the point to provide needed fill for their tracks across the north and south coves.

In 1661, Saybrook residents Margaret Jennings and her husband Nicholas were accused of causing the deaths of Marie Marvin and others. The trial resulted in a finding that they were probably witches, but the proof was not sufficient to execute them.

On October 9, 1701, the Collegiate School of Connecticut was chartered in Old Saybrook. It moved to New Haven in 1716, and was later renamed Yale University.

David Bushnell invented the first submarine, called the Turtle, in Westbrook, Connecticut in 1775. A replica is housed at the Connecticut River Museum in Essex.

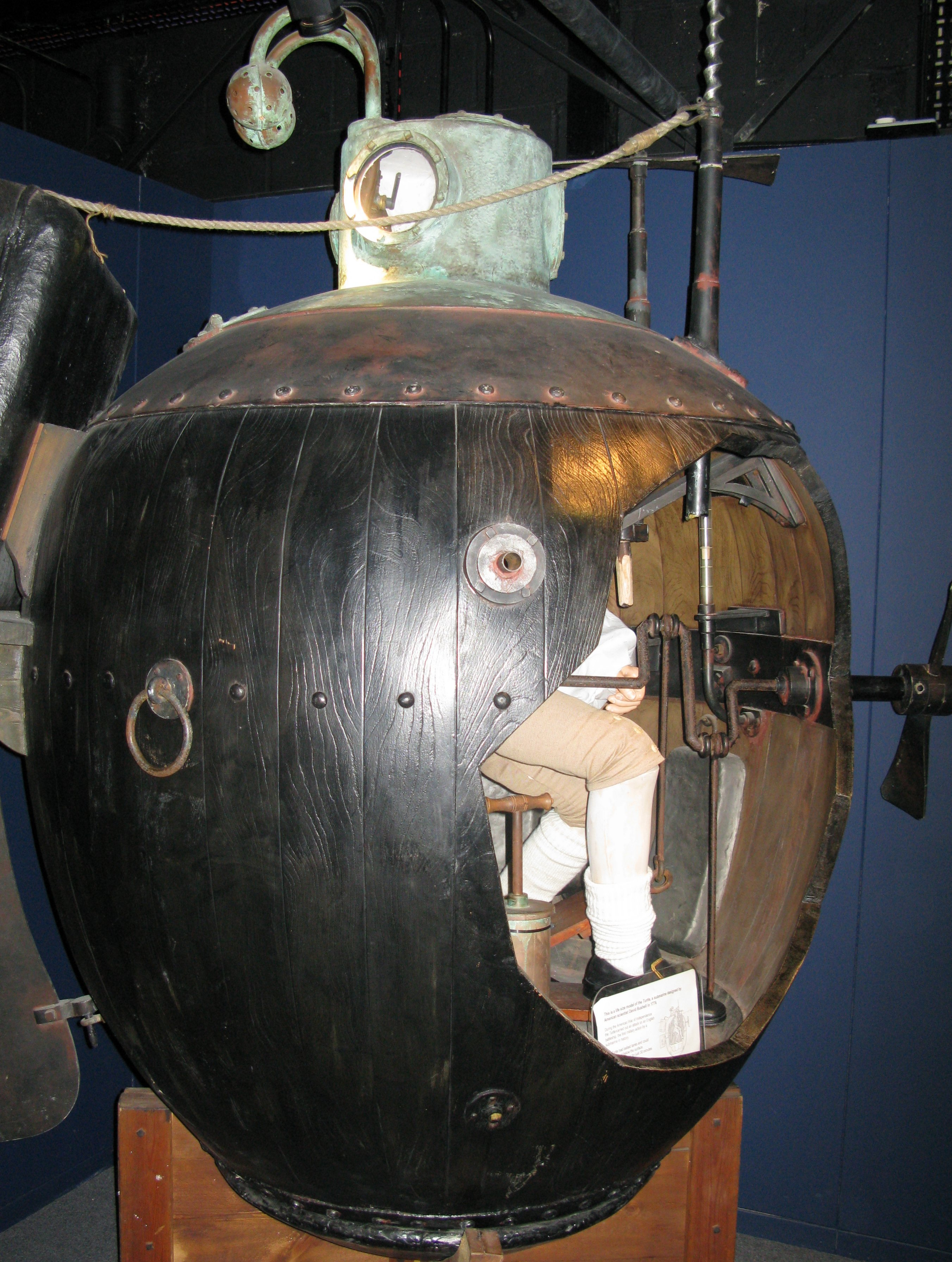
Turtle replica on display at the Royal Navy Submarine Museum

The General Assembly created the separate town of Old Saybrook from Saybrook in 1852. Old Saybrook was partitioned again in 1854, when the northern part became the town of Essex. The rump town of Saybrook itself later received its current name of Deep River in 1947.

=== Later development ===
In early 2007, plans were established to return the former town hall building to its original use as a theater. The theater was completed in 2009 and is named the Katharine Hepburn Cultural Arts Center.

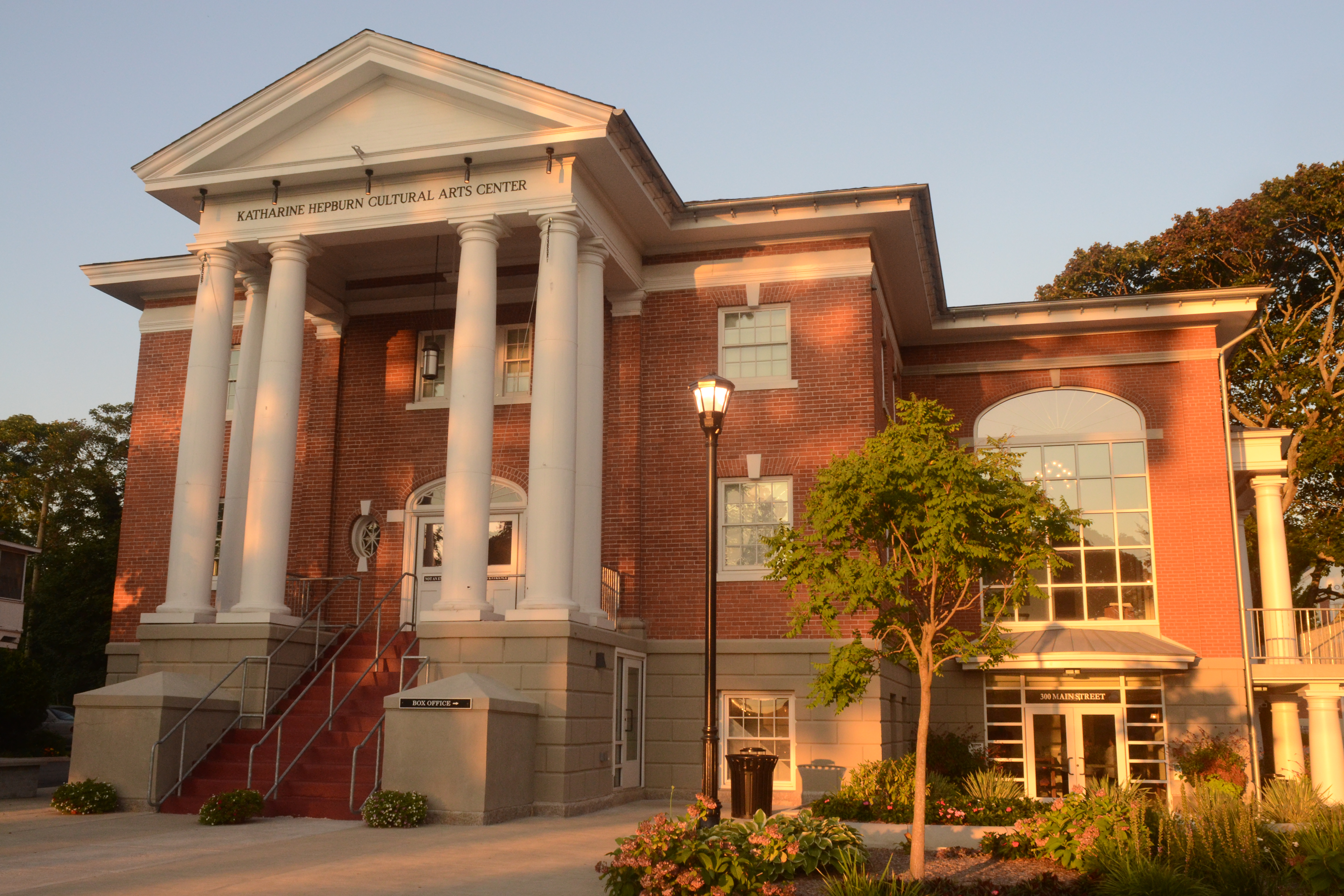
The Katharine Hepburn Cultural Arts Center in 2011

The town has committed spending almost $2 million on the renovation, and at least $810,000 were to be contributed by the state. A committee was attempting to raise another $2.5 million, partly for the renovation and to add two wings, but also for an endowment. The structure was originally built in 1901, and was a theater until the 1940s. After renovations, the theater was to seat 250, and Hepburn memorabilia would be displayed there.

== Geography ==
Old Saybrook is located on the western side of the mouth of the Connecticut River. It is connected to Old Lyme, which lies on the eastern side of the river, by the Raymond E. Baldwin Bridge (Interstate 95) and the Connecticut River railroad bridge.

According to the United States Census Bureau, the town has a total area of 21.6 square miles (56.0 km^{2}), of which 6.6 sq mi (17.0 km^{2}) (30.45%) are covered by water.

=== Principal communities ===
- Chalker Beach
- Cornfield Point
- District of Fencove
- Borough of Fenwick
- District of Fenwood
- Indian Town
- Knollwood
- Old Saybrook Center (includes Saybrook Point)
- District of Otter Cove
- Saybrook Manor
- North Cove

=== Flora ===
Coastal Connecticut (including Old Saybrook) is the broad transition zone where so-called "subtropical indicator" plants and other broadleaf evergreens can successfully be cultivated. Old Saybrook averages about 90 days annually with freeze (temperatures of 32 °F/0 °C) – about the same as Baltimore, Maryland, or Albuquerque, New Mexico, for example. As such, southern magnolias, needle palms, windmill palms, loblolly pines, and crape myrtles are grown in private and public gardens.

== Education ==
Old Saybrook is home to a district educational system. Kathleen E. Goodwin School is for prekindergarten through grade 4, Old Saybrook Middle School is for grades 5 through 8, and Old Saybrook Senior High School is for grades 9 through 12. The high school competes in the Shoreline Conference. From 2018 to 2023, the boys’ soccer team won 5 consecutive state championships.

Old Saybrook is also home to prekindergarten through grade 8 at St John's Catholic School, and toddler–grade 6 at the Children's Tree Montessori School. The town also has a number of students who attend private schools, including nearby parochial schools such as Xavier High School and Mercy High School.

== Demographics ==
Historical population
Census	Pop.	Note	%±
1860	1,105		—
1870	1,215		10.0%
1880	1,302		7.2%
1890	1,484		14.0%
1900	1,431		−3.6%
1910	1,516		5.9%
1920	1,463		−3.5%
1930	1,643		12.3%
1940	1,985		20.8%
1950	2,499		25.9%
1960	5,274		111.0%
1970	8,468		60.6%
1980	9,287		9.7%
1990	9,552		2.9%
2000	10,367		8.5%
2010	10,242		−1.2%
2020	10,481		2.3%
U.S. Decennial Census

=== 2010 U.S. Census ===
As of the 2010 census, 10,242 people, 4,247 households, and 2,923 families were living in the town; 1,108 households had children under 18. The population density was 682.8 inhabitants per square mile (263.6/km^{2}). The 5,602 housing units had an average density of 373.5 per square mile (144.2/km^{2}). The racial makeup of the town was 93.9% White, 0.9% African American, 0.1% Native American, 2.4% Asian, 1.2% from other races, and 1.5% from two or more races. Hispanics or Latinos of any race were 3.3% of the population.

Of the 4,247 households, 23.7% had children under 18 living with them, 56.2% were married couples living together, 7.5% had a female householder with no husband present, and 33.2% were not families. About 28.9% of households were one person and 14.6% were one person 65 or older. The average household size was 2.21, and the average family size was 2.71.

The age distribution was 21.4% under 20, 3.4% from 20 to 24, 16.4% from 25 to 44, 33.5% from 45 to 64, and 25.3% 65 or older. The median age was 50.1 years. The population consisted of 4,852 (47.4%) males and 5,390 (52.6%) females.

The median household income was $80,347 and the median family income was $97,399. Males had a median income of $74,298 versus $49,913 for females. The per capita income for the town was $43,266. About 4.5% of families and 5.9% of the population were below the poverty line, including 6.0% of those under age 18 and 4.3% of those age 65 or over.

=== 2000 U.S. Census ===
At the 2000 census, 10,367 people, 4,184 households, and 2,920 families resided in the town. The population density was 689.5 inhabitants per square mile (266.2/km^{2}). The 5,357 housing units had an average density of 356.3 per square mile (137.6/km^{2}). The racial makeup of the town was 95.8% White, 1.0% African American, 0.1% Native American, 1.7% Asian, 0.1% Pacific Islander, 0.5% from other races, and 0.9% from two or more races. Hispanics or Latinos of any race were 1.9% of the population.

Of the 4,184 households, 27.2% had children under 18 living with them, 59.4% were married couples living together, 7.6% had a female householder with no husband present, and 30.2% were not families. About 25.4% of households were one person, and 12.9% were one person 65 or older. The average household size was 2.41, and the average family size was 2.90.

The age distribution was 21.7% under the age of 18, 4.1% from 18 to 24, 25.2% from 25 to 44, 27.6% from 45 to 64, and 21.5% 65 or older. The median age was 44 years. For every 100 females, there were 89.5 males. For every 100 females age 18 and over, there were 86.3 males.

The median household income was $62,742 and the median family income was $72,868. Males had a median income of $48,527 versus $36,426 for females. The per capita income for the town was $30,720. About 1.5% of families and 4.5% of the population were below the poverty line, including 1.9% of those under age 18 and 9.7% of those age 65 or over.

== Transportation ==
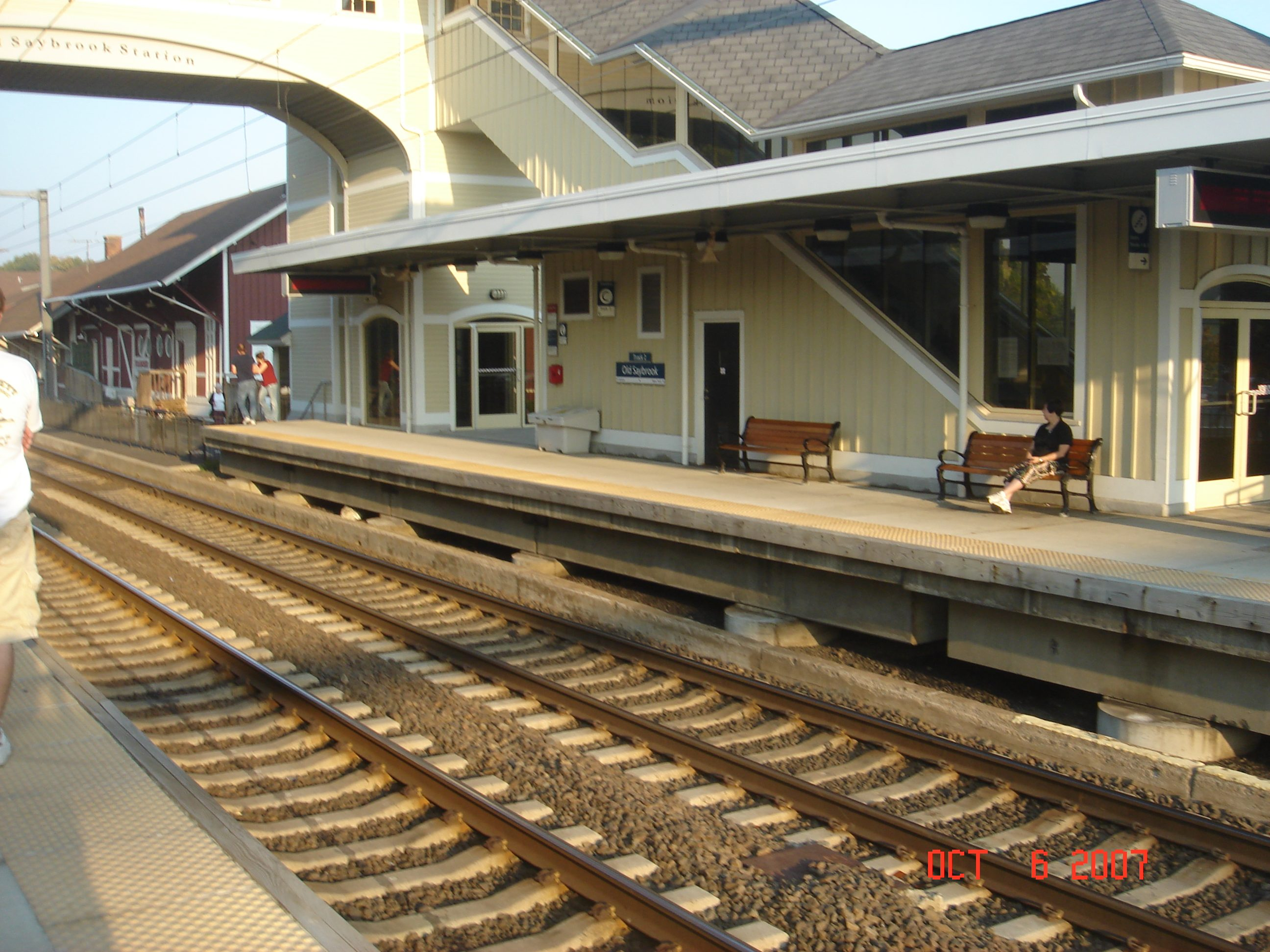
Platforms at the Old Saybrook train station, 2007

Old Saybrook's train station opened in 1873 and was rebuilt in 2002. Amtrak, the national rail passenger system, provides daily service along the Northeast Corridor to Boston, New York, and points south. The high-speed Acela Express passes through Old Saybrook, but does not stop. The local service is provided by the conventional Northeast Regional. The Connecticut Department of Transportation provides regular commuter service to New Haven, New London, and Stamford via the Shore Line East, and connecting service to the MetroNorth Railroad, which runs to Grand Central Terminal in Manhattan.

The Estuary Transit District provides public transportation services throughout Old Saybrook and the surrounding towns through its 9 Town transit services.

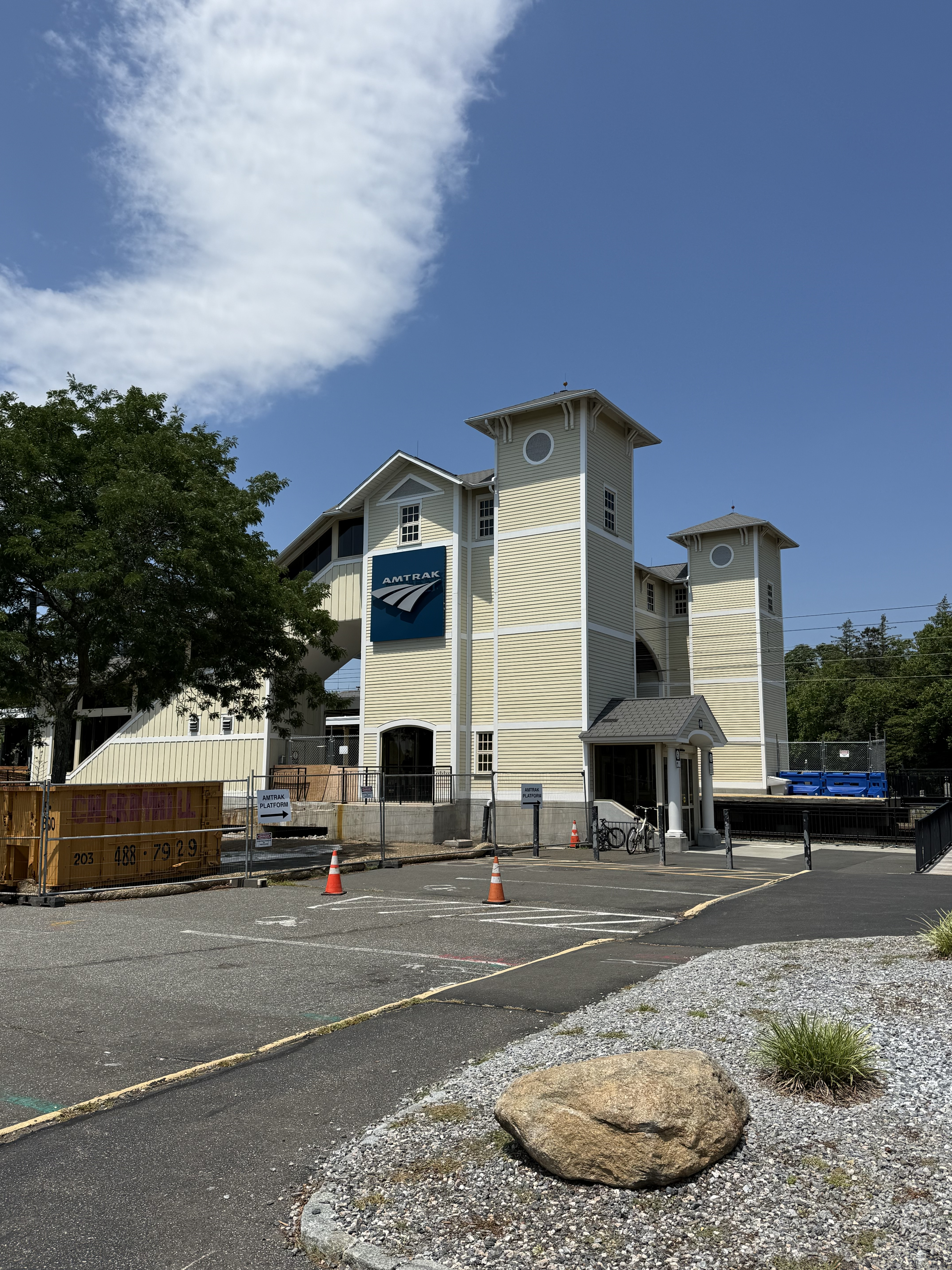
Old Saybrook train station, in 2026

Old Saybrook is served by two freeways that intersect within the town's borders. Interstate 95 runs across the town from west to east (though it is signed north–south), and connects Old Saybrook to New Haven and New London along the Connecticut shoreline. Route 9 has its southern terminus at I-95, and extends to the northwest to ultimately reach Middletown and Hartford.

== Media ==
One radio station is licensed to Old Saybrook: WLIS AM 1420 (variety). The town is also covered by Shore Publishing and the local newspaper the Harbor News.

== National Register of Historic Places in Old Saybrook ==
- Black Horse Tavern, added December 1, 1978
- Elisha Bushnell House, added November 29, 1978
- Connecticut Valley Railroad Roundhouse and Turntable Site, added April 28, 1994
- Jedidiah Dudley House, added April 12, 1982
- Samuel Eliot House, added November 9, 1972
- General William Hart House, added November 9, 1972
- James Pharmacy, added August 5, 1994
- Lynde Point Lighthouse, added May 29, 1990
- Old Saybrook South Green, added September 3, 1976
- Parker House, added November 29, 1978
- Humphrey Pratt Tavern, added November 7, 1972
- Saybrook Breakwater Lighthouse, added May 29, 1990
- William Tully House, added March 15, 1982
- Ambrose Whittlesey House, added August 23, 1985
- John Whittlesey Jr. House, added October 26, 1984

== Notable people ==
- Vin Baker (born 1971), professional basketball player in the NBA (1993–2006)
- Virginia Biddle (1910–2003), American revue performer and showgirl
- Fred Crane (1840–1925), American baseball player in the 1860s/1870s
- Lion Gardiner (1599–1663), colonist and engineer
- Katharine Hepburn (1907–2003), four-time Academy Award-winning actress and Hollywood legend, lived in the borough of Fenwick
- John Clellon Holmes (1926–1988), writer and poet associated with the "Beat Generation"
- Anna Louise James (1886–1977), first female African American pharmacist in Connecticut
- Ann Petry (1908–1997), novelist, journalist, and biographer
- Maria Sanford (1836–1920), American educator and professor at Swarthmore College and University of Minnesota
- Elmer Eric Schattschneider (1892–1971), prominent political scientist and former president of the American Political Science Association
- Simon Willard (1605–1676), colonist

== Image gallery ==
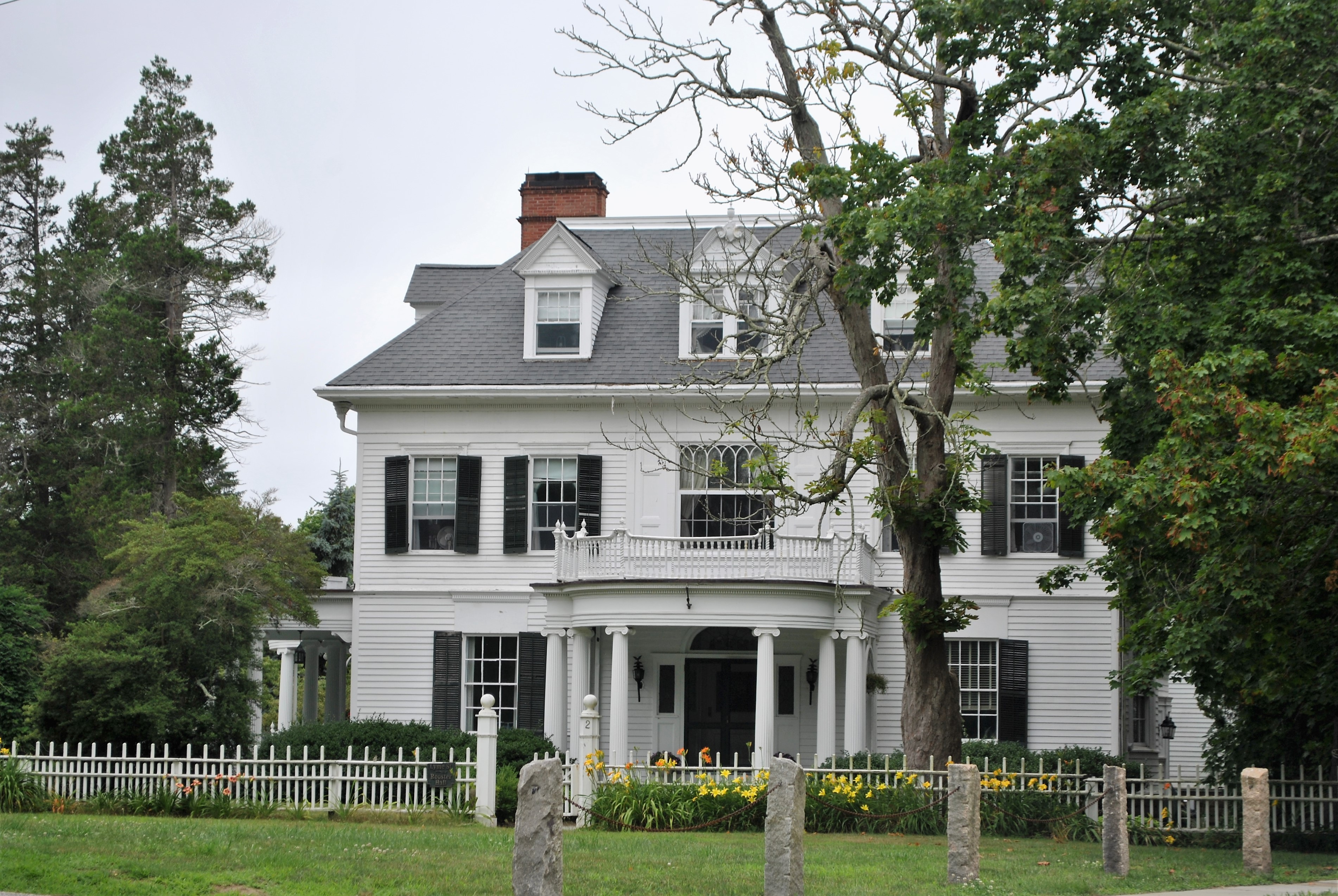

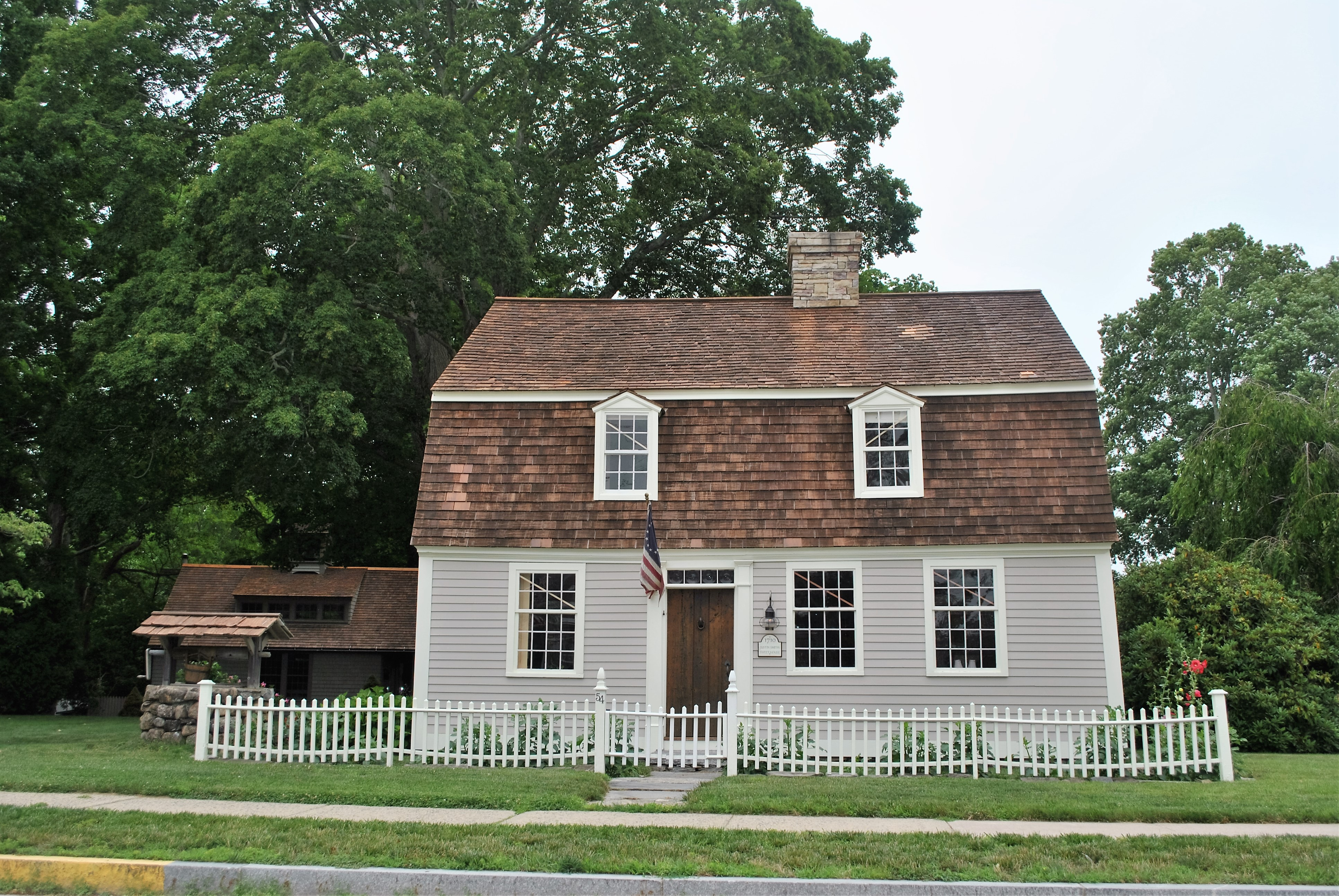
Justin Smith Sweet House, 1710

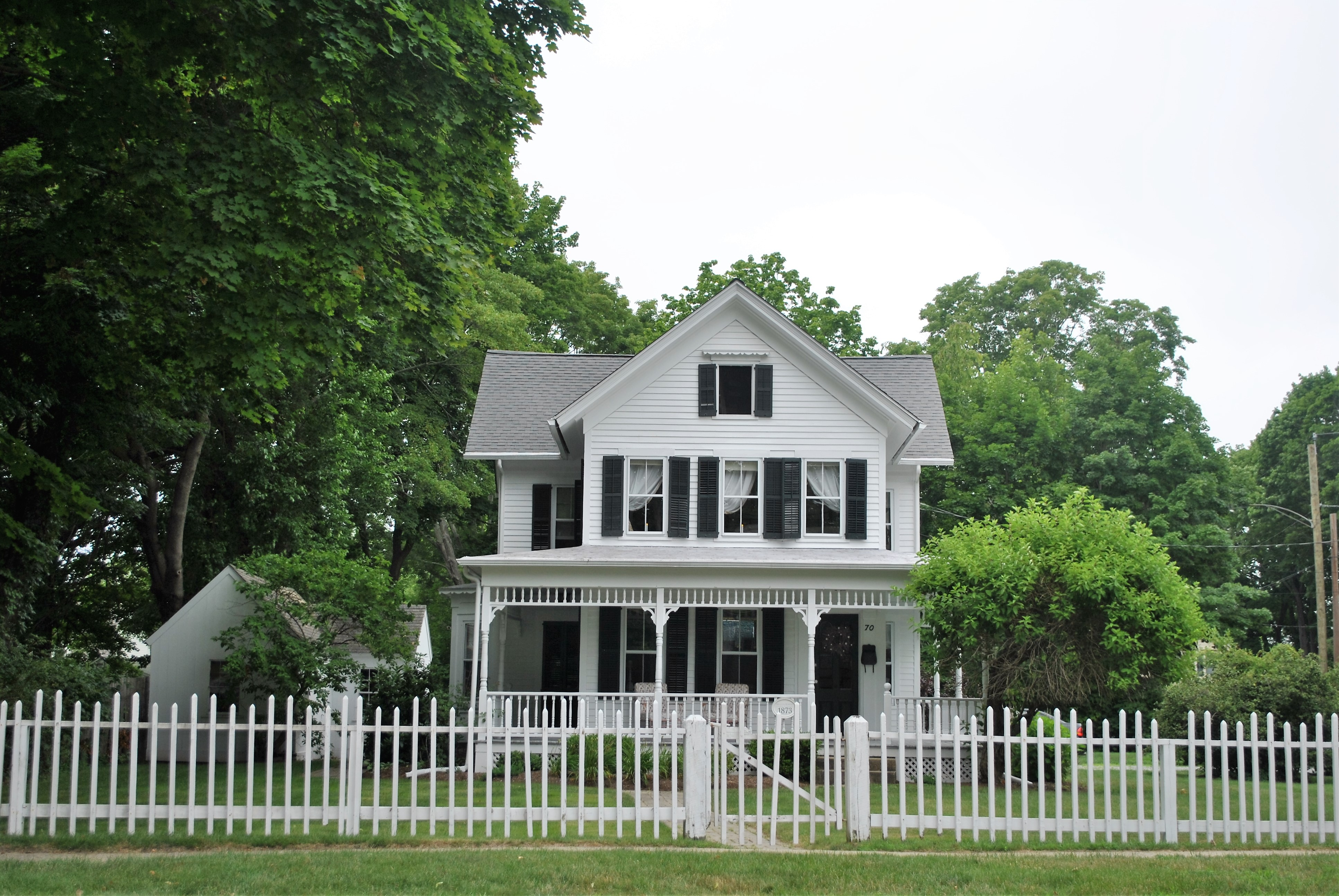

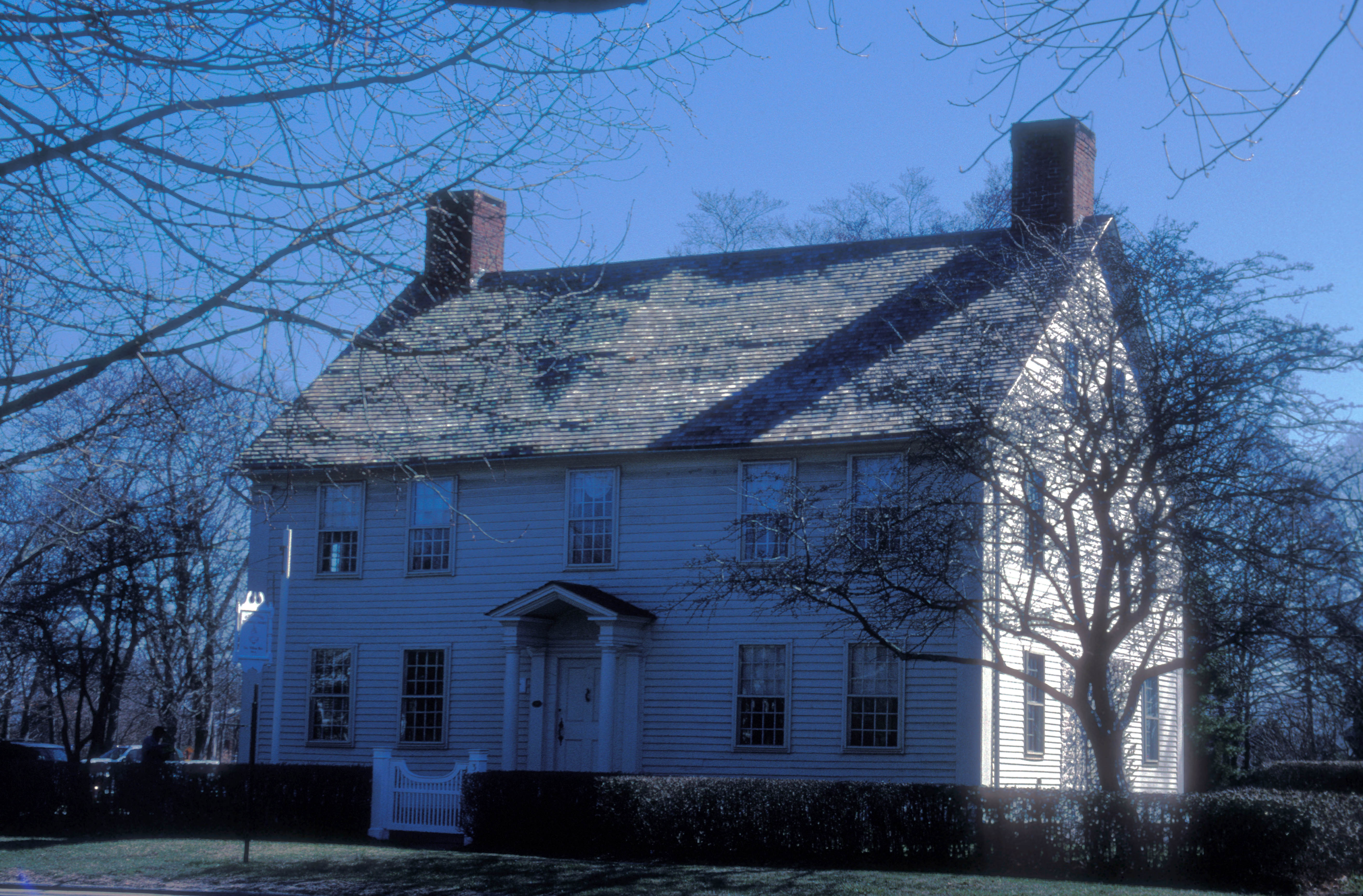
Gen. William Hart House, 1767

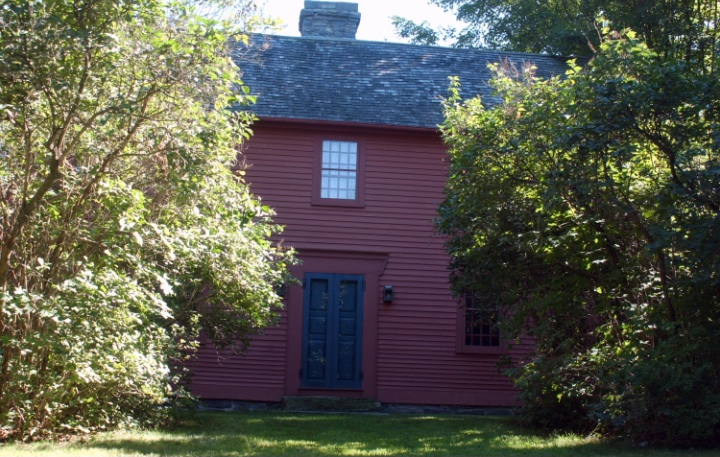
John Whittlesey Jr. House, 1693

== See also ==
- Saybrook, Illinois, is named in honor of Old Saybrook.
- Saybrook College, Yale University is named after the town.
- Saybrook University is named in honor of a 1964 psychology conference that took place in the town.
