= Jedidiah Dudley House =

Historic house in Connecticut, United States

- U.S. National Register of Historic Places
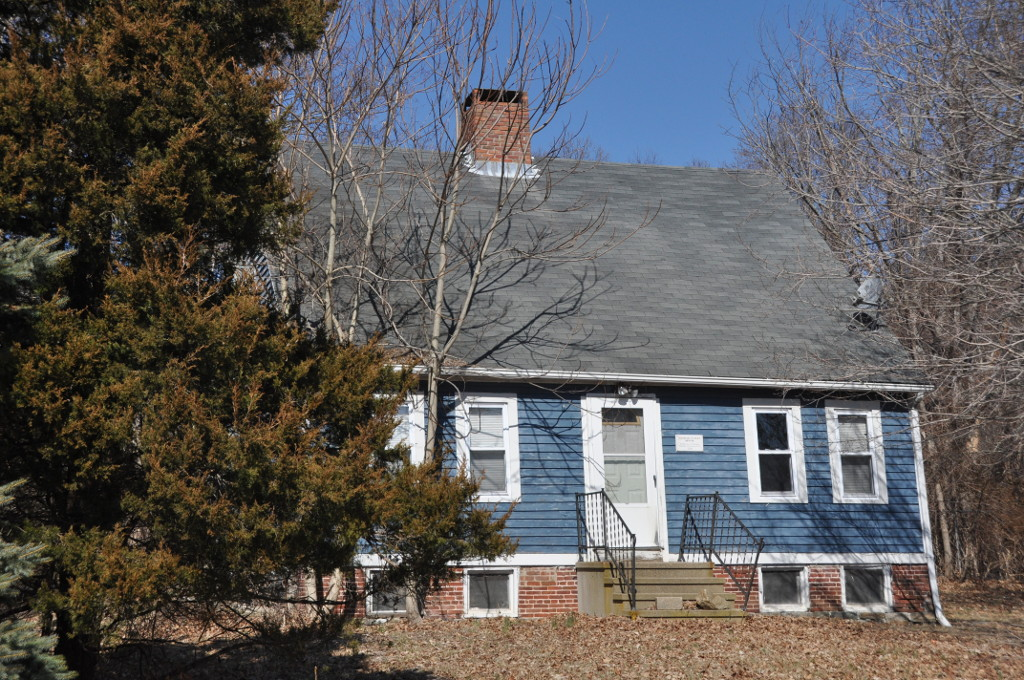

- Location within Connecticut Location within the United States
- Location: Springbrook Road, Old Saybrook, Connecticut
- Coordinates: 41°18′48.2″N 72°21′51.0″W
- Area: 1 acre (0.40 ha)
- Built: c.1750
- NRHP reference No.: 82004339
- Added to NRHP: April 12, 1982

The Jedidiah Dudley House, (also known as the John Whittlesey Jr. House) is a historic house on Springbrook Road in Old Saybrook, Connecticut. Built in the second half of the 18th century, it is a good example of period architecture, and is notable for its association with a family of ferry operators on the nearby Connecticut River. It was listed on the National Register of Historic Places in 1982.

== Description and history ==
The Jedidiah Dudley House is located just east of Exit 68 of Interstate 95, on the north side of Springbrook Road. It is a 1 1/2-story wood-frame structure, with a steeply pitched gable roof, central chimney, clapboarded exterior, and a rubble fieldstone foundation. Its main facade is five bays wide, with a center entrance in a slightly asymmetrical arrangement. The interior exhibits construction evidence that the building was partially built out of recycled timbers. It also has surviving Federal period fireplace surrounds.

The house is one of several Dudley and Whittlesey family houses clustered at a ferry landing in Old Saybrook. In 1662, John Whittlesey and his brother-in-law William Dudley were awarded a privilege to operate a ferry on the Connecticut River. This crossing, joining Old Saybrook and Lyme, served the major coastal route. This house was probably built around 1750, on land originally granted to the ferry operators. It was probably built by Jedidiah Dudley, who operated the ferry. Dudley was accused of misappropriating customs revenues by the government of the Connecticut Colony, and the ensuing scandal cost Dudley both the ferry privilege and his house. Its only major alteration was the addition of a bathroom in the rear right corner, and an ell extending from the same section.

== See also ==
- John Whittlesey Jr. House, on Ferry Road, also owned by Whittleseys and NRHP-listed
- National Register of Historic Places listings in Middlesex County, Connecticut
