= Dollie Lowther Robinson =

- Died: August 4, 1983
- Occupation: Politician
- Organization: United States Women's Bureau

Dollie Lowther Robinson (died August 4, 1983) was an American politician and labor rights worker, best known for her work with labor unions.

== Early life and education ==
An Elizabeth City N.C. native, Dollie Lowther Robinson was educated at Brooklyn College. She went on to receive a LL.B. degree from New York Law School. Robinson also received labor scholarships to the Hudson Shore Labor School and the Wellesley Institute for Social Progress.

== Career and impact ==
=== Labor Rights ===
Robinson worked for labor rights in a variety of capacities. She served as a social investigator for New York City. She was associated with multiple organizations including the American Federation of Labor and Congress of Industrial Organizations (AFL-CIO). In 1955, she was appointed Secretary of the New York State Department of Labor. In 1961, she was appointed as Special Assistant to the Director of the Women's Bureau of the Department of Labor under the Kennedy Administration. Robinson left this position in 1963 to serve as special assistant to the president of the Hotel and Allied Service Union, Peter Ottley. Robinson was also involved in the political arena. In 1968, she ran for a seat in the United States House of Representatives against New York State Assemblywoman Shirley Chisholm and New York State Senator William C. Thompson.

=== Adirondack Park ===
Named a delegate for the 1967 New York State Constitutional Convention, Robinson delivered an impassioned speech against a proposed amendment that would make the Adirondacks susceptible to new construction within its wild forests. She emphasized the Park belongs to everyone, not just the wealthy. Her speech was well received and Robinson’s work is credited with the amendment’s defeat and considered a precursor to the Adirondack Park Agency Act of 1971. Adirondack Park is the largest park in the contiguous United States and has the largest trail system in the nation.
