= The Street (novel) =

1946 novel by Ann Petry

- First edition
- Author: Ann Petry
- Language: English
- Genre: African-American Literature
- Publisher: Houghton Mifflin Company
- Publication date: 1946
- Publication place: United States
- Media type: Print (Hardcover and Paperback)
- Pages: 436 pp

The Street is a novel published in 1946 by African-American writer Ann Petry. Set in World War II era Harlem, Petry's novel is a commentary on the social injustices that confront her character, Lutie Johnson, as a single Black mother during this period. Lutie is confronted by racism, sexism, and classism on a daily basis in her pursuit of the American dream for herself and her son, Bub. Lutie fully subscribes to the belief that if she follows the adages of Benjamin Franklin by working hard and saving wisely, she will be able to achieve the dream of being financially independent and move from the tenement in which she lives on 116th Street.

The Street was an instant bestseller. It is the first novel by an African-American woman to sell more than a million copies.

== Plot summary ==
Shifting between multiple perspectives, The Street uses extensive flashbacks to reveal its plot. Lutie Johnson has an eight-year-old son, Bub, to support. Separated but not legally divorced from Bub's father, Jim, Lutie feels that Jim's inability to find employment, her decision to work as a domestic for a wealthy white family in Connecticut, and Jim's subsequent infidelity ruined her marriage.

Lutie moves into a small apartment on 116th Street in Harlem. Taking an immediate dislike to the super, Jones, she decides to take the apartment, agreeing to pay about thirty dollars a month in rent.

Jones becomes sexually obsessed with Lutie; recalling his youth in the Navy, Jones remembers his feelings of loneliness and sexual frustration while aboard ship, a condition that worsened as he began working and living in basement apartments and boiler rooms. Jones resents his live-in girlfriend, Min, due to her lack of physical attractiveness, venting his aggression on her. Jones befriends Bub in hopes of getting Lutie to pay attention to him. Sensing Jones' intentions, Mrs. Hedges, the madame of a brothel, tells Jones not to bother as a wealthy white man has already taken an interest in her.

Mrs. Hedges, a heavy-set woman who is bald and badly disfigured from a fire, is referring to Junto, the proprietor of a local bar as well as the owner of several pieces of real estate. Junto has been friends with Mrs. Hedges for many years, striking up her acquaintance as she rummaged through the trash for food. Junto, who, at that time collected cans and scraps for a living, employs her then makes her a partner of sorts, putting her in charge of maintenance and rent collection once he buys his first building. After surviving the fire, Mrs. Hedges starts running a brothel out of her apartment. Acutely sensing the desperation and boredom of the young people who live in the neighborhood, Mrs. Hedges suggests that Junto open up dance halls, bars, and brothels, which Junto does. Junto, who has developed feelings for Mrs. Hedges by this point, makes an overture to her but is rejected.

Min, meanwhile, increasingly fearful of Jones, seeks out a practitioner of hoodoo. After getting a referral from Mrs. Hedges, Min finds David The Prophet. Surprised and comforted by how closely David listens to her, Min pays for a cross, some powder, some drops for Jones' morning coffee, and some candles to burn at night. Feeling reassured, Min hangs the cross over the bed as David suggested. When Min defiantly refuses to tell Jones where she had been, he advances on her angrily until he sees the cross over the bed. Feeling a superstitious dread, Jones retreats.

One night, Lutie has drinks at Junto's. After entertaining the crowd with a song, Lutie makes the acquaintance of Boots Smith, a bandleader and an employee of Junto's. Insincerely promising to help her establish a singing career, Boots convinces Lutie to take a ride with him. Lutie, who has already decided not to sleep with Boots, agrees to sing with his band. After returning home, she discovers that Bub has let Jones into the apartment while she was out and that Jones had rifled through her things.

Sometime after Lutie begins singing, Jones attacks her in the hallway, attempting to drag her into the basement. Lutie screams for help and Mrs. Hedges comes to her rescue. After inviting her inside for tea, Mrs. Hedges tells her of Junto's interest in her. Junto also tells Boots the same thing, making him promise not to pursue a romance with Lutie. Boots, indebted to Junto for helping him evade the draft, reluctantly agrees. He also agrees not to pay Lutie for her singing and to arrange a meeting between Lutie and Junto.

After Mrs. Hedges tells him yet again that he can't have Lutie, Jones angrily decides to get even with her. He convinces Bub to steal mail, paying Bub a few dollars. Bub, who initially refused Jones' offer, is eager to work; after hearing Lutie (who has just realized that she won't be paid for her singing) loudly cursing their poverty, Bub decides to help out by getting a job. Jones also implicates Min in the scheme by tricking her into getting copies of the mailbox keys made for him.

Bub is caught stealing the mail and sent to the Children's Shelter until he can be seen in Children's Court. Desperate to get Bub out of custody, Lutie consults a lawyer. Not knowing that she doesn't need a lawyer for the upcoming hearing, she agrees to pay two hundred dollars for the man's services.

Despairing of coming up with the money on her own, Lutie decides to ask Boots for help. Boots promises to get the money for her the next night. The next day, Lutie visits Bub at the Children's Shelter but is unable to ask him about the letters. That night, Mrs. Hedges once again reminds her that Junto is interested in her. Feeling apprehensive, Lutie makes her appointment with Boots. Junto is there. Realizing Boots, Mrs. Hedges, and Junto have been working in concert, she yells at Boots to get Junto out of the apartment. After conferring with Boots, Junto leaves, warning Boots once again not to make any romantic overtures to Lutie. It is then that Boots decides to take Lutie for himself whether Junto approves or not.

After a half-hearted attempt to convince Lutie to become Junto's mistress, Boots makes a sexual advance on her, kissing her and grabbing her breast. He slaps her twice when she pulls away. Lutie grabs a heavy candlestick and beats Boots to death with it, funneling all of her rage at her powerlessness into a succession of violent blows. Lutie steals Boots' wallet, deciding to use the money inside to pay the lawyer's fees. Realizing that she would be caught, however, Lutie puts half the money back and flees the apartment. Knowing that she will never be able to rescue her son, Lutie buys a one-way ticket to Chicago and boards a train.

== Characters ==
- Lutie Johnson, the story's protagonist, is a single black mother who moves away from her family to live on her own in 1940s Harlem. She lives in a building with her son, Bub, and is constantly reading and thinking about Benjamin Franklin, who she considers a hero, and whose work-ethic she tries to emulate.
- Mrs. Hedges is a madam who lives in Lutie's building. She pays off the police to make sure that she is not prosecuted for running a whorehouse. She spends her days gazing out of her window and at the people passing on 116th street.
- Min lives with Jones, the abusive super. She has a cross above her bed, and sees Prophet David about ways she can make Jones a better man.
- Jones is the super of Lutie's building, who lusts after Lutie, and is a very lonely man. He was previously in the Navy, and he also worked as a night watchman.
- Junto owns Junto's Bar and Grill. Junto is a term originating in English politics of the 1640s and the early 1700s, that was made famous in America by Benjamin Franklin who founded a club in Philadelphia with the name Junto (c. 1730), and the Bar and Grill in the book serves as a meeting place for the poor people of Harlem.
- Boots Smith is a band leader who offers Lutie a chance to sing in his band. Employed by Junto.
- Bub is Lutie's son. He is young, and dislikes being left alone. He is scared of the dark.

== Critical analysis ==
Heather J. Hicks argues that Petry uses realism to show urban culture and not just everyday life. Hicks's states that the novel was compared to Henry James's novel "The Princess Casamassima" in the way that both novels reflect the power of watching. She refers to a scene in the novel where the main character Lutie Johnson is fantasying about a situation in which the hallway of the apartment is full of bed being rented out by multiple people and a domestic dispute happens while the neighbors watch. She states that Petry uses the realism of surveillance as if she is displaying something in a theatre. The author goes on to say that compared to other novels, it brings into question if African American suffering in urban life displayed in novels is romanticized for public observation. Hicks explains that the novel focuses on the fact that when it comes to Lutie Johnson's character it shows that she is a product of her environment, and how her struggles are caused by external influences rather than internal. Hicks claims that The Street does not offer easy solutions because it does not just represent reality, it also challenges the reader to about the ethics of observation.

In a different article, Hicks argues that Ann Petry presents urban life as a space where people are constantly watching and being watched. Hicks explains that this idea of surveillance shapes how characters behave and limits their freedom. She focuses on Lutie Johnson, showing how she is observed by her neighbors, the landlord, and Junto, while also becoming a watcher herself. Hicks also highlights an early scene in the book where Lutie struggles to explain to her son Bub the reason white people expect black people to shine shoes. She uses this moment to show how racism is closely tied to the act of looking, where black individuals are constantly judged, watched, and defined by others. This reinforces the idea that power operates through observation, not just through actions. Hicks states that this constant watching creates what she calls a "strange communion," where people are connected through judgment rather than support. She also argues that the reader becomes part of this system, placed in the role of a spectator watching Lutie's struggles. This raises questions about whether stories like The Street turn black suffering into something for public viewing. Hicks concludes that the novel is not just about inequality, but about how surveillance and observation shape people's lives, challenging readers to think critically about the role of watching and being watched.

Vernon E. Lattin touches on how in the novel, Ann Petry critiques the idea that hard work always leads to success. Lattin argues that The Street shows that the American Dream was not meant to included African Americans living in poverty. Lattin highlights the fact that the character Lutie Johnson believed in the rags to riches mindset and was inspired by people like Benjamin Franklin. Though she was faced with the challenge of working low paying jobs and poor living conditions, Lutie Johnson maintained the mindset that if she just continued to work hard, she could have a better life for herself as well as her son. Lattin also suggests that the reason why African Americans cannot reach the American Dream is because of a corrupt system. He mentions characters such as Junto and Mrs. Hedges saying that they had success by taking advantage of others and says that Luttie cannot get success because the system is against her, saying that every time she makes a move in the right step, she is always met with a trap.

Evie Shockley argues that Ann Petry uses Gothic elements to show how harsh and confining life is for black women in urban spaces. Shockley explains that Lutie Johnson's experience can be seen as a kind of "living death," where she is alive but is trapped by racism, sexism, and poverty to the put where she isn't living. Shockley focuses on Lutie's goal of creating a stable home for herself and her son Bub, saying that though this desire makes sense, it is also unrealistic. She introduces the idea of "gothic homelessness," meaning that even though Lutie has a place to live, it does not feel safe or secure. Instead, her apartment feels more like a trap than a home. She also explains that the idea of "home" is meant to be seen as comforting, safe, and welcoming, but for Lutie and her son, it never fully exists. The boundaries that are meant to protect her end up excluding her instead, showing how the idea of home for black women often ends up being more of an illusion. Shockley concludes that "The Street" uses Gothic themes to show how Lutie's search for safety and stability is both understandable and impossible, highlighting how the systems around her keep her from ever truly feeling at home.

== See also ==
- Their Eyes Were Watching God
