= Bishop School =

Bishop School may refer to:

- Bishop School (Detroit)
- Bishop School (Waterbury, Connecticut)
