= Alphonso Johnson House =

Historic house in Connecticut, United States

- U.S. National Register of Historic Places
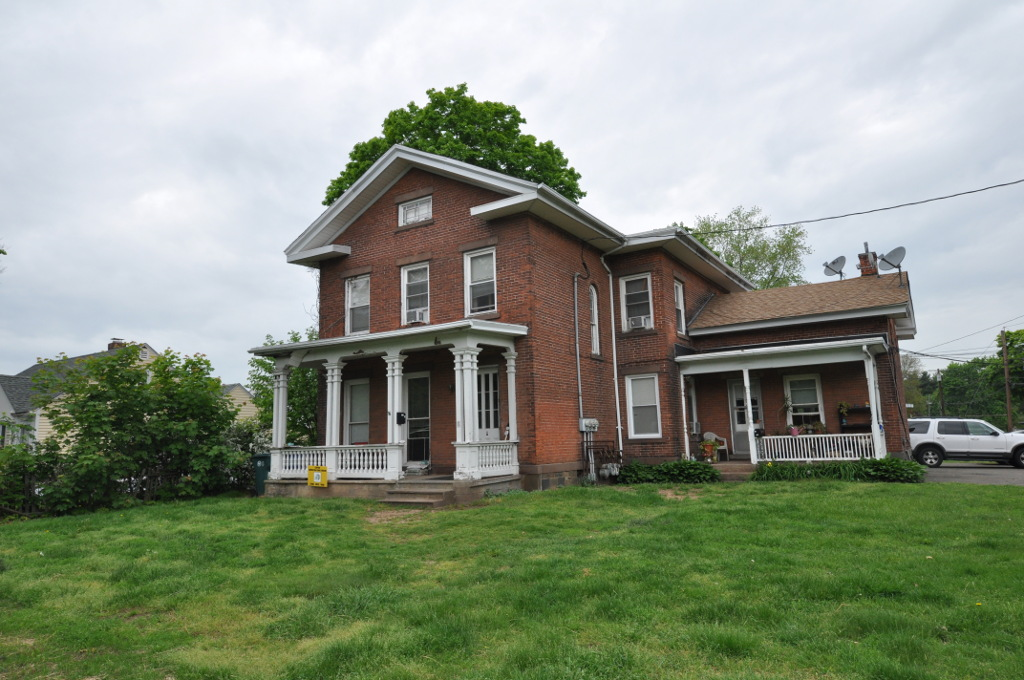

- Location within Connecticut Location within the United States
- Location: 1 Gilbert Avenue, Hamden, Connecticut
- Coordinates: 41°21′26″N 72°56′15″W
- Area: less than one acre
- Built: 1859
- Architectural style: Greek Revival, Italianate
- NRHP reference No.: 91001922
- Added to NRHP: January 17, 1992

The Alphonso Johnson House is a historic house at 1 Gilbert Avenue in Hamden, Connecticut. Built in 1859, it is one of the town's few 19th-century brick houses, and a distinctive example of transitional Greek Revival-Italianate architecture. It was listed on the National Register of Historic Places in 1992.

== Description and history ==
The Alphonso Johnson House is located in what is now a suburban residential area of southern Hamden, at the northwest corner of Gilbert and Circular Avenues. It is a 2 1/2-story structure, built with load-bearing brick walls and covered by a gabled roof. It has an L-shaped plan, with a 1 1/2-story brick ell to the right, and a 20th-century garage to the rear. The brick is laid in common bond, and the roof is of a shallow pitch typical of the Greek Revival period. The front facade is three bays wide, with the main entrance in the center bay, flanked by elongated sash windows. A single-story porch extends across the facade, with Italianate square paneled posts and a balustrade with heavy turned balusters. Most windows are rectangular sash, but there is one round-arch window, set on the east facade where it illuminates the stairwell. Most of the interior now has modern finishes, but some original period detailing remains in two of the downstairs rooms.

The house was built about 1859 by Alphonso Johnson, who grew up in a house (no longer standing) that was located across the street. The house was probably built using bricks made in the Johnson brickyard, which was located to the northwest on Wilmot Brook. It is one of a small number of brick houses to survive from the 19th century in the town, and has Italianate features reminiscent of the work of New Haven architect Henry Austin, applied to a more traditionally Greek Revival house shape.

== See also ==
- National Register of Historic Places listings in New Haven County, Connecticut
