= Meriden Curtain Fixture Company Factory =

- U.S. National Register of Historic Places
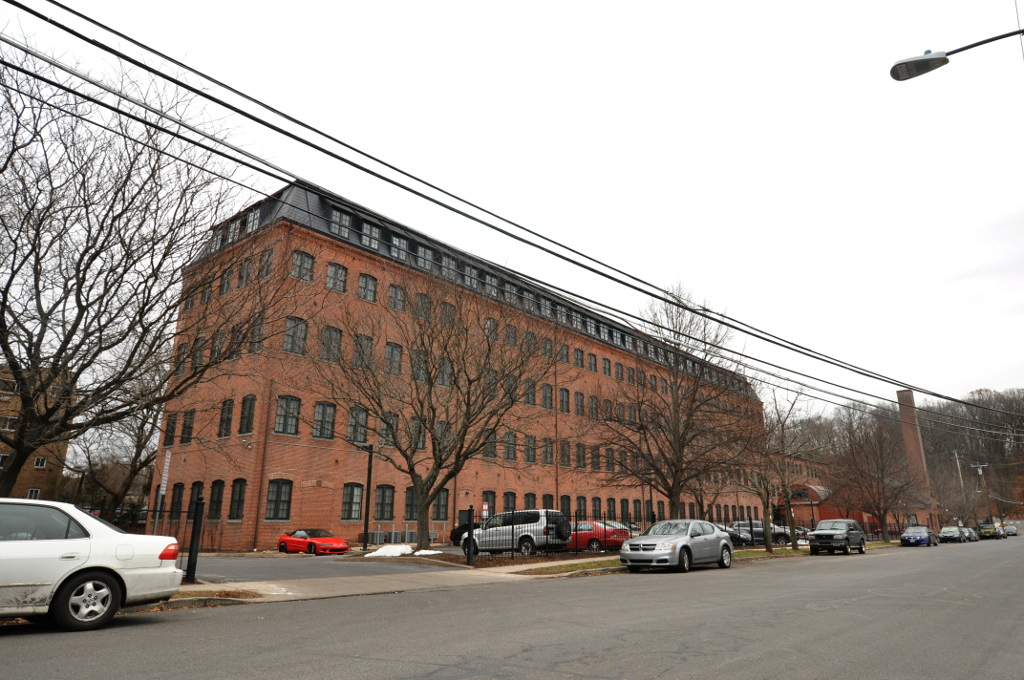

- Location within Connecticut Location within the United States
- Location: 122 Charles Street, Meriden, Connecticut
- Coordinates: 41°31′52″N 72°47′30″W
- Area: 2 acres (0.81 ha)
- Built: 1892
- NRHP reference No.: 86003290
- Added to NRHP: December 4, 1986

The Meriden Curtain Fixture Company Factory is a historic factory complex at 122 Charles Street in Meriden, Connecticut. Built in 1892 for a company founded in 1869, it is a good example of late-19th century industrial architecture, and is notable for its association with Charles Parker, one of the city's leading industrialists of the period. It was listed on the National Register of Historic Places in 1986. The complex has been converted to residential use.

== Description and history ==
The former Meriden Curtain Fixture Company Factory is located two blocks south of Main Street in central Meriden, occupying most of one city block on the north side of Charles Street between Broad Street and Parker Avenue. The factory consists of six buildings, five of which are connected in a roughly linear east-west arrangement; the sixth, the generator/boiler house, is detached and stands to the north. The buildings range in height from one to six stories, with building 3, the tallest, capped by a distinctive mansard roof. The complex is unified visually by band of decorative tilework just below the roofline.

The curtain fixture business was begun in 1869 by Sawyer & Buckley, and was later taken over by the Charles Parker Company. Parker, then managed by Charles Parker's son Wilbur, greatly expanded the business, overseeing construction of the majority of this complex in 1892. It was the largest manufacturer in the nation that produced curtain rollers, fringing, and curtain cloth. The business was acquired in 1905 by the Columbia Shade Company. In the 20th century it had a variety of smaller tenants, and was eventually converted to residential use.

== See also ==
- National Register of Historic Places listings in New Haven County, Connecticut
