= Wilby High School (1920 building) =

- U.S. National Register of Historic Places
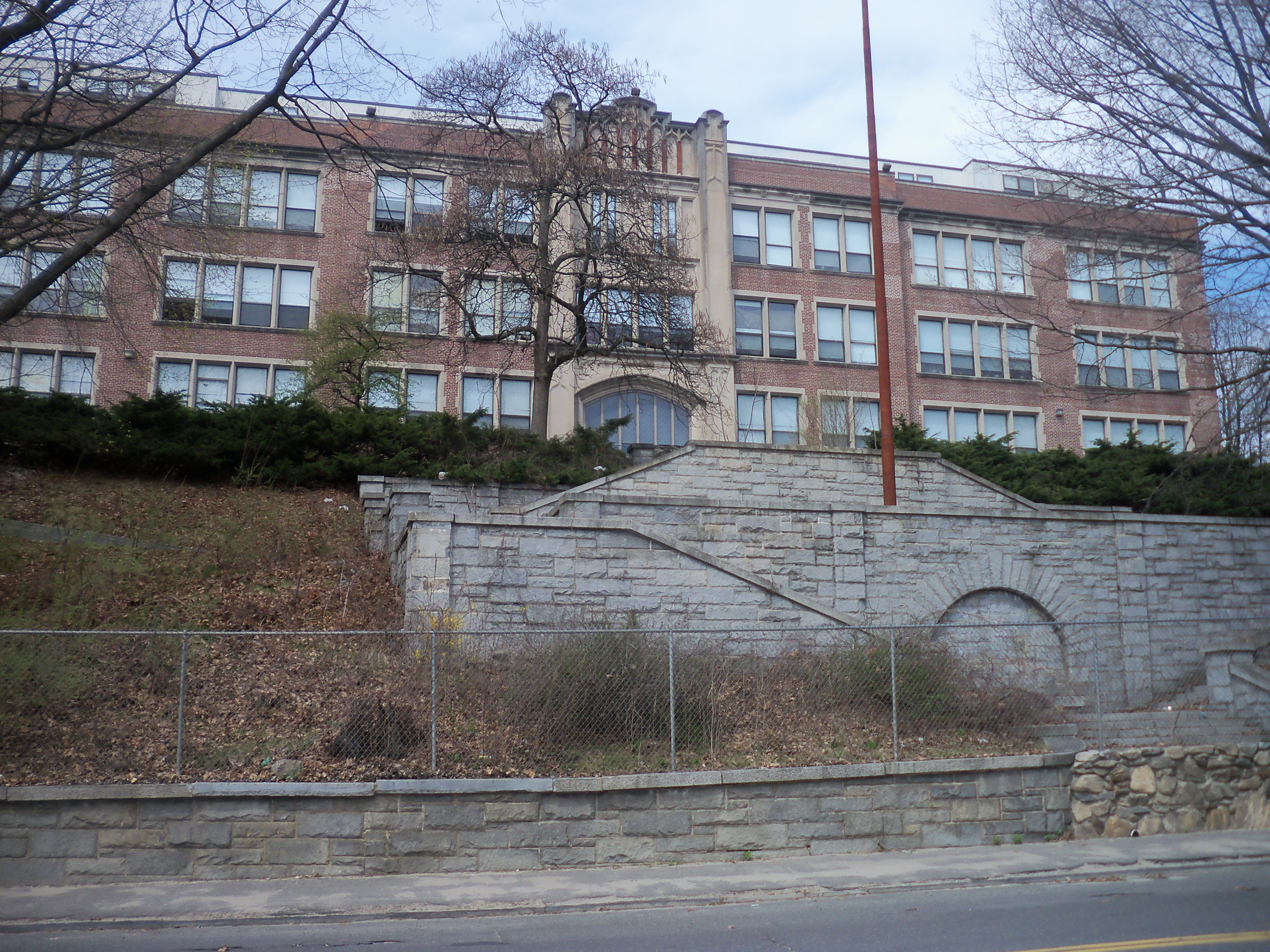

- Location within Connecticut Location within the United States
- Interactive map showing the location for Old Wilby High School
- Location: 260 Grove Street, Waterbury, Connecticut
- Coordinates: 41°33′36″N 73°2′45″W
- Area: 2.5 acres (1.0 ha)
- Built: 1919
- Architect: Walsh, Louis A.
- Architectural style: Late Gothic Revival, Tudor Gothic
- NRHP reference No.: 82004366
- Added to NRHP: June 14, 1982

The Wilby High School is a historic school building at 260 Grove Street in Waterbury, Connecticut. Built in 1917-20, it is one of the oldest surviving secondary school buildings in the city, and a distinctive example of Tudor Gothic architecture. The building served as a school until 1978; the current Wilby High School is located on Bucks Hill Road. This building was listed on the National Register of Historic Places in 1982.

== Architecture and history ==
Waterbury's first Wilby High School building is located in a residential area north of downtown Waterbury, on 2.5 acres (1.0 ha) of land between Grove Street to the south and Pine Street to the north. The three-story masonry building is set into a steeply sloping hillside, with ground-level entrances on several levels. The main entrance is on the south facade, accessed via a series of terraced stairs. The building is roughly square, measuring 190 by 196 feet (58 m × 60 m). Tudor Revival features include the monumental main entrance surround, as well as the secondary entrances on Pine Street. The interior follows a "hollow square" plan, with a square of hallways, classrooms and offices on the outside walls, and gymnasiums and auditorium in the central space.

Construction began on the school in 1917, and it opened to students in 1920. The building was designed by architect Louis A. Walsh, then one of Waterbury's leading architects. The city's first high school, Crosby High School, was well over capacity, and Wilby was built to educate students in a commercially oriented curriculum. It was named for Stephen Wilby, a longtime principal of Crosby High who died quite suddenly in 1917. The building served as a high school until 1978, when the present Wilby High was opened. After sitting vacant for some years, it was converted to residential use.

== See also ==
- National Register of Historic Places listings in New Haven County, Connecticut
