= Hamden Bank & Trust Building =

- U.S. National Register of Historic Places
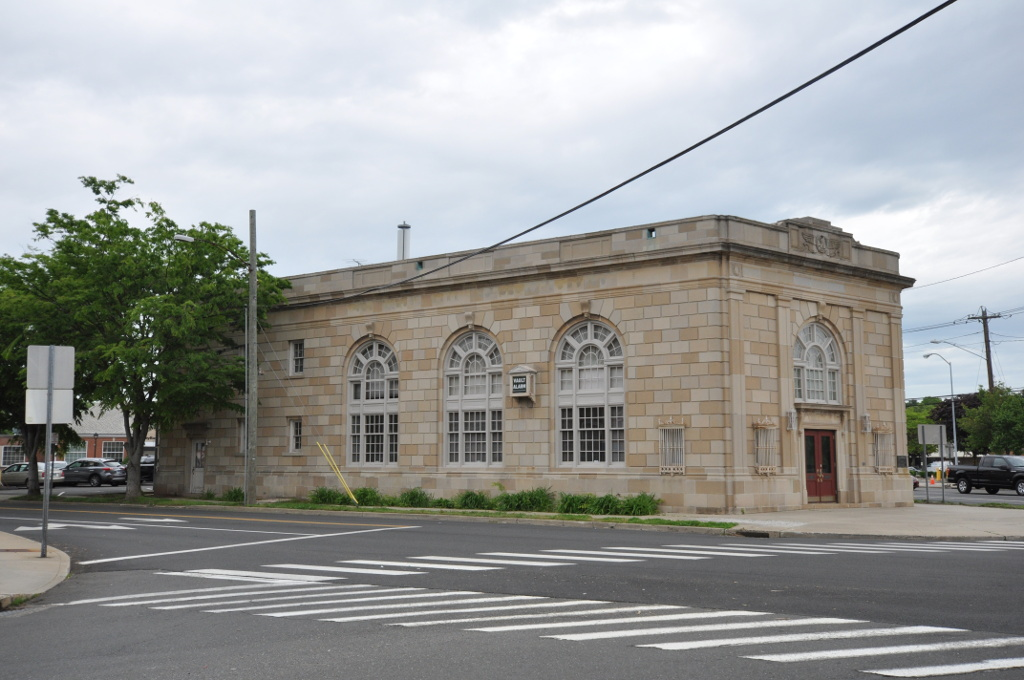

- Location within Connecticut Location within the United States
- Interactive map showing the location for the Hamden Bank and Trust Building
- Location: 1 Circular Avenue, Hamden, Connecticut
- Coordinates: 41°20′47″N 72°56′04″W
- Area: 0.3 acres (0.12 ha)
- Built: 1927
- Built by: National Construction Co.
- Architect: Townsend, C. Frederick
- Architectural style: Classical Revival
- NRHP reference No.: 90000148
- Added to NRHP: March 1, 1990

The Hamden Bank & Trust Building is a historic commercial building at 1 Circular Avenue in Hamden, Connecticut. Built in 1927, it is a fine local example of Classical Revival architecture. It was listed on the National Register of Historic Places in 1990. Used as a bank for many years, it now houses professional offices.

== Description and history ==
The Hamden Bank & Trust Building is located in a large commercial district in southern Hamden, occupying a triangular lot at the junction of Circular Avenue and Dixwell Avenue (Connecticut Route 10). The building is basically trapezoidan in shape, with a narrow facade facing the corner and longer sides paralleling the two roadways, which come together at an acute angle. The building is constructed out of cast stone with an ashlar finish, with the stones in a variety of colors. The corner facade houses the main entrance, which is flanked by fluted pilasters, with a second pair nearer the corners. Each of the long sides has three large round-arch windows. A parapet, cornice, and entablature run around all three of the street-facing sides.

Hamden Bank & Trust was founded in 1925 by a group of local businessmen, and was originally located in rented space. This building was completed in 1928, to design by C. Frederick Townsend of New Haven. The town post office was located in the rear of the building, and the bank rented out office space to professionals on the upper level. The bank failed in 1931, a casualty of the Great Depression. From 1937 to 1983 the building housed the Hamden branch of the Union & New Haven Trust Company, and came to be known as the Union Trust building.

== See also ==
- National Register of Historic Places listings in New Haven County, Connecticut
