= Prospect Green Historic District =

Historic district in Connecticut, United States

- U.S. National Register of Historic Places
- U.S. Historic district
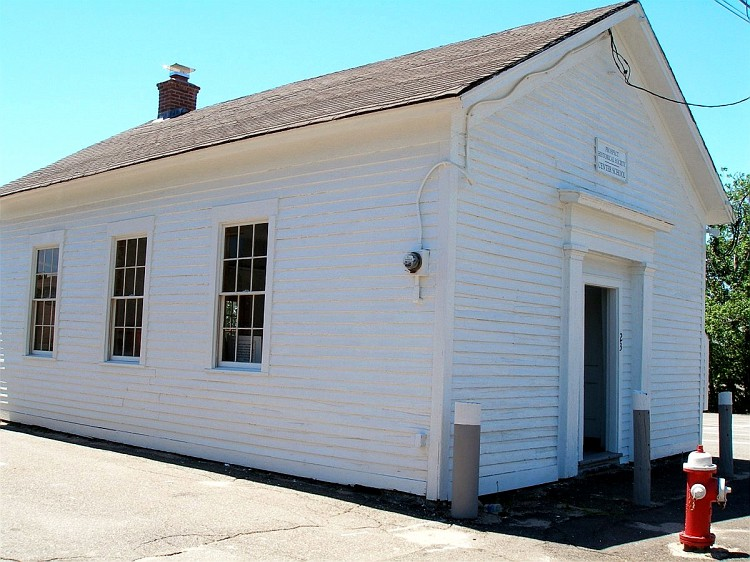
- The Center School

- Location within Connecticut Location within the United States
- Location: 2, 8, 10, 12, 17, 19, 21, 23, 25, 27 and 30 Center Street, Prospect, Connecticut
- Coordinates: 41°30′4″N 72°58′42″W
- Area: 13 acres (5.3 ha)
- Architect: Walters, F.E.; Schoenhardt Architects
- Architectural style: Greek Revival, Stick/Eastlake, et al.
- NRHP reference No.: 00000560
- Added to NRHP: June 16, 2000

Prospect Green Historic District is a historic district in the New England town of Prospect, Connecticut. The district is centered on the Prospect Green, the town green. The green is located on the highest settled point in New Haven County. The green is bounded by Route 68 and Center and Church Streets.

The main feature of the green is a Civil War Soldiers Monument (1907) situated near the center. Near it is a flag pole and another memorial. At the north end of the green is the former town library built in 1903-1904. Several historic buildings surround the green including, the current Congregational Church (built in 1941 and the fourth church on the site), the Grange Hall (1947), the Parsonage (1941), a 19th-century residence once used as a parsonage, and a school house (c. 1865, now used by the local historical society).

The town of Prospect was settled in the 18th century and separately incorporated in 1827. Its town center arose in 1778, when the site, the highest in town, was selected for construction of a church. The town green was also laid out at that time, but remained in church ownership until 1905, when it was sold to the town. In the 19th century it developed as the civic heart of the town, with a Greek Revival school house built in 1867, and its first dedicated town library building (now the Meeting Place) built in 1905 as a gift of the Tuttle family. The library now occupies modern premises south of the church.

== See also ==
- National Register of Historic Places listings in New Haven County, Connecticut
