= George S. Abbott Building =

- U.S. National Register of Historic Places
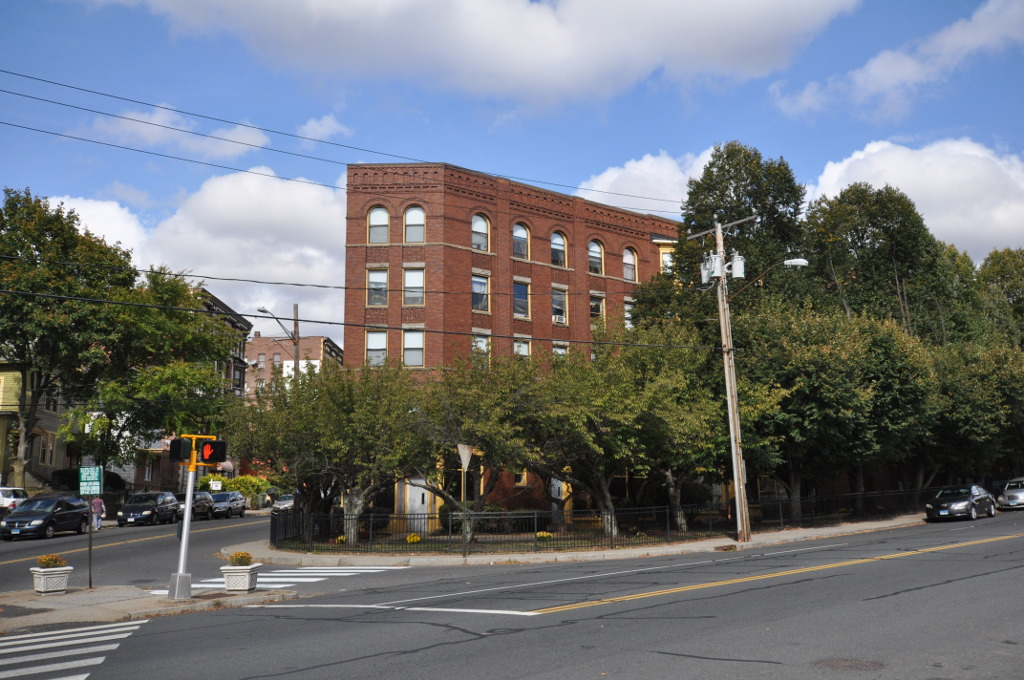

- Location within Connecticut Location within the United States
- Location: 235-247 North Main Street, Waterbury, Connecticut
- Coordinates: 41°33′31″N 73°2′20″W
- Area: 0.7 acres (0.28 ha)
- Built: 1899
- Built by: Lawler, Henry A.
- Architectural style: Classical Revival, Romanesque
- NRHP reference No.: 82004359
- Added to NRHP: June 14, 1982

The George S. Abbott Building, also known as Wheeler and Wilson Building and Abbott Towers Apartments, is a historic mixed-use residential and commercial building at 245-247 North Main Street in Waterbury, Connecticut. Built in 1899, it is locally unusual for its all-masonry construction, and its unique adaptation to a triangular lot. The building was listed on the National Register of Historic Places in 1982.

== Description and history ==
The Abbott Building is located a few blocks North of Downtown Waterbury, at the northeast corner of North Main and Cooke Streets. The lot is a sloping triangular area of about 3/4 acre, which the building occupies most of. The building is actually composed of two structures, both built mainly with orange brick, although some portions are red brick and there is stone and wooden trim. Five stories in height, it has a distinctive blend of Romanesque and Panel Brick styles, and is an architectural elegant solution to a challenging lot, which is both narrow and steeply sloped. The ground floor historically housed several small storefronts, which have since been converted to residential use.

The block was built by contractor Henry A. Lawler in 1899 for George S. Abbott, a local real estate developer, as a speculative venture. The building went through a number of ownership changes, with some owners living in one of the upper units, or operating a business on the premises, or both. From 1930 to about 1980, one of its storefronts was home to the city's longest-running small business, a tire shop.

== See also ==
- National Register of Historic Places listings in New Haven County, Connecticut
