= House at 161 Damascus Road =

Historic house in Connecticut, United States

- U.S. National Register of Historic Places
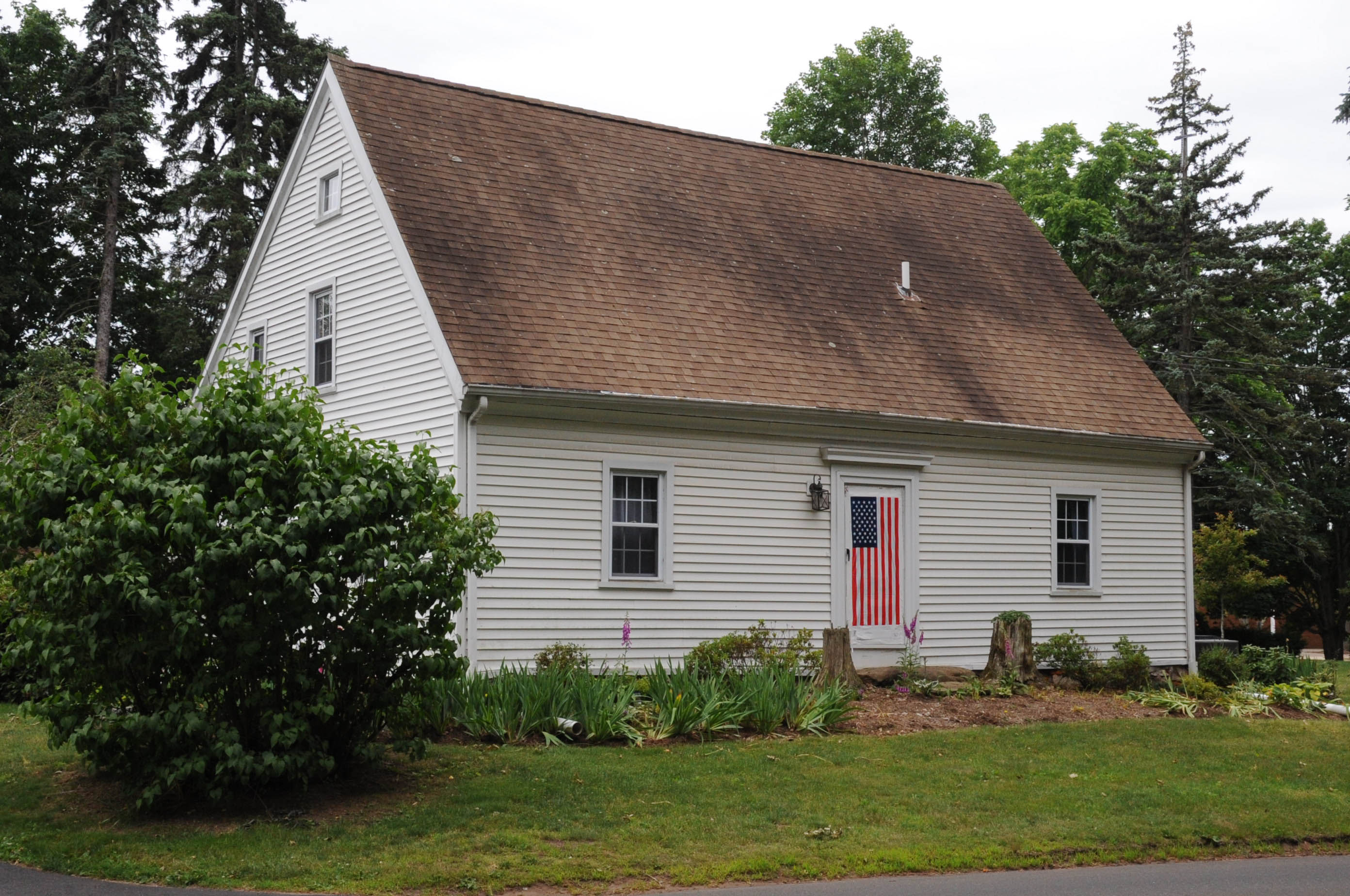

- Location within Connecticut Location within the United States
- Location: 161 Damascus Road, Branford, Connecticut
- Coordinates: 41°17′07″N 72°46′53″W
- Area: 0.8 acres (0.32 ha)
- Built: c. 1750
- Architectural style: Colonial, New England Colonial
- MPS: Colonial Houses of Branford TR
- NRHP reference No.: 88002632
- Added to NRHP: December 1, 1988

161 Damascus Road is a historic house in Branford, Connecticut. Built about 1750, it is a well-preserved example of mid-18th century colonial residential architecture. It was listed on the National Register of Historic Places in 1988.

== Description and history ==
Damascus Road is a major secondary through route traversing the east side of Branford in an east–west direction. Number 161 is located on the south side, east of Patrick Lane and in front of a public school. It is a 1 1/2-story wood-frame structure, with a side-gable roof and clapboarded exterior. Its main facade is three bays wide, with small sash windows placed on either side of the centered entrance. The entrance has a simply framed surround, as do the windows, and the building corners have narrow cornerboards.

By its style and construction, the house has been estimated to have a construction date of about 1750. Alterations include the removal of its central chimney (at least above the roof line) in the late 20th century. It was in the early 20th-century thought to be the Blackstone Homestead, but this was determined not to be the case by later research. The house was for many years associated with a 26-acre (11 ha) farm property, which remained intact and associated with it until 1963, when most of that property was sold to the town for construction of the school.

== See also ==
- National Register of Historic Places listings in New Haven County, Connecticut
