= National Register of Historic Places listings in New Haven County, Connecticut =

Location of New Haven County in Connecticut

This is a list of the National Register of Historic Places listings in New Haven County, Connecticut. It is intended to be a complete list of the properties and districts on the National Register of Historic Places in New Haven County, Connecticut, United States. The locations of National Register properties and districts for which the latitude and longitude coordinates are included below, may be seen in an online map.

There are 278 properties and districts listed on the National Register in the county, including 10 National Historic Landmarks. The city of New Haven is the location of 71 of these properties and districts, including 9 National Historic Landmarks; they are listed separately, while the 210 properties and districts in the remaining parts of the county, including one National Historic Landmark (Henry Whitfield House), are listed here. Three sites appear in both lists.

Contents: Counties and municipalities in Connecticut

Fairfield (city of Bridgeport | town of Greenwich | city of Stamford) | Hartford (city of Hartford | town of Southington | town of West Hartford | town of Windsor) | Litchfield | Middlesex (city of Middletown) | New Haven (city of New Haven) | New London | Tolland | Windham

This National Park Service list is complete through NPS recent listings posted September 25, 2026.

== Current listings ==
=== Exclusive of New Haven ===
	Name on the Register	Image	Date listed	Location	City or town	Description
1	George S. Abbott Building	George S. Abbott Building	June 14, 1982 (#82004359)	235-247 North Main Street; 41°33′31″N 73°02′20″W	Waterbury	1899 all-masonry construction with unique adaptation to a triangular lot.
2	Academy of Our Lady of Mercy at Lauralton Hall	Academy of Our Lady of Mercy at Lauralton Hall	August 31, 2011 (#11000611)	200 High Street; 41°13′23″N 73°03′52″W	Milford	The oldest Catholic college-preparatory school for girls in the state.
3	Acadian House	Acadian House	September 5, 1975 (#75001928)	Union Street; 41°17′07″N 72°40′47″W	Guilford	Served as a refuge for Acadians expelled from Nova Scotia.
4	Aeolian Company Factory Complex		January 24, 2023 (#100008602)	85 Tremont Street; 41°33′05″N 72°47′12″W	Meriden	
5	Allis-Bushnell House	Allis-Bushnell House	February 25, 1982 (#82004352)	853 Boston Post Road; 41°16′45″N 72°35′33″W	Madison	Built in 1785; now a historic house museum.
6	American Mills Web Shop	American Mills Web Shop	March 10, 1983 (#83001276)	114-152 Orange Avenue; 41°17′44″N 72°57′20″W	West Haven	Early twentieth-century Italianate industrial architecture (1903-1914).
7	William Andrew House	William Andrew House	December 27, 2002 (#02001695)	131 Old Tavern Road; 41°15′55″N 73°00′44″W	Orange	Georgian colonial residence.
8	Moses Andrews House	Moses Andrews House	December 1, 1978 (#78002859)	424 West Main Street; 41°32′23″N 72°49′03″W	Meriden	Circa 1760 saltbox house.
9	Ansonia Library	Ansonia Library	August 23, 1985 (#85001828)	53 South Cliff Street; 41°20′43″N 73°04′37″W	Ansonia	Richardsonian Romanesque building from 1892.
10	George Atwater House	George Atwater House	January 17, 1992 (#91001921)	1845 State Street; 41°19′57″N 72°54′01″W	Hamden	Well-preserved 1820 vernacular farmhouse.
11	Atwater-Linton House	Atwater-Linton House	January 17, 1992 (#91001923)	1804 State Street; 41°19′53″N 72°54′01″W	Hamden	Home of William James Linton (1812-1897), English-born artist, engraver, author, and political reformer.
12	George Baldwin House	George Baldwin House	September 15, 1977 (#77001411)	530 Foxon Road; 41°19′54″N 72°48′17″W	North Branford	Greek Revival design attributed to Ithiel Town.
13	Timothy Baldwin House	Timothy Baldwin House	December 1, 1988 (#88002633)	186 Damascus Road; 41°17′12″N 72°46′56″W	Branford	Colonial from 1819.
14	Zaccheus Baldwin House	Zaccheus Baldwin House	December 1, 1988 (#88002631)	154 Damascus Road; 41°17′10″N 72°47′09″W	Branford	Late 18th-century Colonial.
15	Bank Street Historic District	Bank Street Historic District	July 28, 1983 (#83001277)	207-231 Bank Street; 41°33′11″N 73°02′30″W	Waterbury	Isolated group of four late 19th-century brick buildings, including one of only two Queen Anne commercial buildings in Waterbury.
16	John Barker House	John Barker House	August 3, 1974 (#74002051)	898 Clintonville Road; 41°24′46″N 72°49′29″W	Wallingford	Gambrel-roofed brick house from 1756.
17	Samuel Beach House	Samuel Beach House	December 1, 1988 (#88002634)	94 East Main Street; 41°17′13″N 72°48′24″W	Branford	Wood-frame house built circa 1790 with a steep side-gable roof, central chimney, and clapboarded exterior.
18	Benedict-Miller House	Benedict-Miller House	June 12, 1981 (#81000616)	32 Hillside Avenue; 41°33′42″N 73°02′30″W	Waterbury	Queen Anne house from 1879, designed by Palliser, Palliser & Company.
19	Beth El Synagogue	Beth El Synagogue	May 11, 1995 (#95000560)	359-375 Cooke Street; 41°34′03″N 73°02′27″W	Waterbury	Byzantine Revival building with gold dome built in 1929.
20	Birmingham Green Historic District	Birmingham Green Historic District	April 21, 2000 (#00000325)	Roughly bounded by 5th, Caroline, 4th, and Olivia Streets; 41°19′21″N 73°05′20″W	Derby	Town green surrounded by three churches, the Sterling Opera House and other historic structures.
21	Bishop School	Bishop School	November 30, 1982 (#82001003)	178 Bishop Street; 41°33′50″N 73°02′12″W	Waterbury	Built in 1886, with subsequent expansions, in an eclectic mix of Italianate and Romanesque Revival styles, to serve a growing immigrant population.
22	Blackstone House	Blackstone House	December 1, 1988 (#88002639)	37 First Avenue; 41°15′58″N 72°47′11″W	Branford	18th-century timber-frame structure, with a steeply pitched gabled roof, central chimney and clapboarded exterior.
23	Joseph Blakeslee House	Joseph Blakeslee House	April 13, 1998 (#98000362)	1211 Barnes Road; 41°28′47″N 72°46′03″W	Wallingford	Late 18th-century Cape style residence; collapsed and demolished in 2008.
24	Timothy Bradley House	Timothy Bradley House	December 1, 1988 (#88002630)	12 Bradley Street; 41°16′36″N 72°49′14″W	Branford	Built circa 1730, with a gabled roof, central chimney, and clapboarded exterior; in the Canoe Brook Historic District.
25	Branford Center Historic District	Branford Center Historic District	May 6, 1987 (#87000636)	Roughly bounded by Route 1, the Branford River on the east and the south, and Monroe and Kirkham Streets; 41°16′42″N 72°48′45″W	Branford	Highlights include the neoclassical town hall (1857) and James Blackstone Memorial Library (1893).
26	Branford Electric Railway Historic District	Branford Electric Railway Historic District	June 3, 1983 (#83001278)	17 River Street; 41°15′59″N 72°51′21″W	East Haven	Trolley line and historic trolley collection.
27	Branford Point Historic District	Branford Point Historic District	September 15, 1988 (#88001583)	Roughly along Harbor Street north from Curve Street to Branford Point and also Maple Street east from Reynolds Street to Harbor Street; 41°15′57″N 72°49′18″W	Branford	Residences in a range of styles including late Federal, Greek Revival, Italianate, Second Empire, Stick, Queen Anne, Arts and Crafts, Shingle, and Colonial Revival.
28	Bridge No. 1132	Bridge No. 1132	September 29, 2004 (#04001091)	CT 80 at the Hammonasset River; 41°21′26″N 72°36′45″W	Madison	Open-spandrel concrete arch bridge built in 1934; extends into Killingworth in Middlesex County.
29	Aaron Bronson House	Aaron Bronson House	July 29, 1993 (#93000656)	846 Southford Road; 41°28′17″N 73°10′58″W	Southbury	Well-preserved Cape from about 1785.
30	Josiah Bronson House	Josiah Bronson House	February 25, 1982 (#82004356)	Breakneck Hill Road; 41°32′51″N 73°07′29″W	Middlebury	Wood-frame structure built about 1738 with a gabled roof, central chimney, and clapboarded exterior. The Marquis de Lafayette and his troops camped in the area during the American Revolutionary War in 1781 and 1782.
31	Buckingham House	Buckingham House	July 25, 1977 (#77001406)	61 North Street; 41°13′42″N 73°03′25″W	Milford	Circa 1725 house with beaded front clapboards, dutch doors, and beautifully designed interior woodwork.
32	Bullet Hill School	Bullet Hill School	February 23, 1972 (#72001346)	Main Street; 41°28′56″N 73°12′50″W	Southbury	One of the oldest brick school buildings in Connecticut.
33	Thomas Burgis II House	Thomas Burgis II House	December 28, 2000 (#00001562)	85 Boston Street; 41°16′56″N 72°40′41″W	Guilford	Circa 1735 Colonial saltbox house.
34	Canoe Brook Historic District	Canoe Brook Historic District	April 11, 2002 (#02000335)	Roughly along Bradley Street, Cherry Hill Road, Home Place, Lincoln Avenue, and Main and North Harbor Streets; 41°16′37″N 72°49′21″W	Branford	Residential area first settled in the 1680s; includes the Harrison House Museum and the Thomas Harrison House, the district's oldest surviving buildings.
35	Dr. Andrew Castle House	Dr. Andrew Castle House	March 31, 2000 (#00000299)	555 Amity Road; 41°22′38″N 73°00′04″W	Woodbridge	High-style Greek Revival from 1838; home of three prominent local physicians.
36	Center Street Cemetery	Center Street Cemetery	August 1, 1997 (#97000833)	2 Center Street; 41°27′19″N 72°49′26″W	Wallingford	Dating from about 1670, this cemetery has memorials to Lyman Hall and Moses Yale Beach.
37	Charter Oak Firehouse	Charter Oak Firehouse	March 17, 1994 (#94000255)	105 Hanover Street; 41°32′12″N 72°48′24″W	Meriden	Romanesque building from 1876 with prominent four-story tower.
38	Chatfield Farmstead	Chatfield Farmstead	March 15, 2010 (#10000061)	265 Seymour Road; 41°23′36″N 73°02′35″W	Woodbridge	Gothic revival main house and three level bank barn.
39	Cheshire Historic District	Cheshire Historic District	August 29, 1986 (#86002793)	Roughly bounded by Main Street, Highland Avenue, Wallingford Road, South Main, Cornwall, and Spring Streets; 41°29′50″N 72°54′15″W	Cheshire	Noteworthy eighteenth and nineteenth century structures including the Cheshire Town Hall, Congregational Church, Hitchcock-Phillips House and Abijah Beach Tavern.
40	Colony Street-West Main Street Historic District	Colony Street-West Main Street Historic District	September 4, 1987 (#87001387)	1-62 Colony, 55 Grove, 1-119 and 82-110 West Main Streets; 41°32′19″N 72°48′17″W	Meriden	Commercial and mixed residential-commercial buildings built from about 1850 to 1940.
41	Congregation Mishkan Israel	Congregation Mishkan Israel	May 20, 2021 (#100006598)	785 Ridge Road; 41°21′22″N 72°54′04″W	Hamden	Mid-twentieth-century modern synagogue; congregation long associated with the civil rights movement.
42	Curtis Memorial Library	Curtis Memorial Library	April 27, 1981 (#81000618)	175 East Main Street; 41°32′08″N 72°47′53″W	Meriden	Classical revival built in 1903 from white Vermont marble and topped with a copper dome.
43	Reuben Curtiss House	Reuben Curtiss House	July 29, 1993 (#93000658)	1770 Bucks Hill Road; 41°28′33″N 73°10′11″W	Southbury	Built in 1840, incorporating earlier elements, resulting in a blend of Colonial and Greek Revival styles.
44	Thomas Darling House and Tavern	Thomas Darling House and Tavern	January 17, 1979 (#79002639)	1907 Litchfield Turnpike; 41°21′41″N 72°58′59″W	Woodbridge	Well-preserved Colonial Cape from 1774.
45	James Alexis Darling House	James Alexis Darling House	September 4, 2020 (#100005527)	1932 Litchfield Turnpike; 41°21′53″N 72°58′56″W	Woodbridge	Greek revival farmhouse from 1842.
46	Depot Street Bridge	Depot Street Bridge	March 9, 2007 (#07000108)	Depot Street; 41°26′31″N 73°03′48″W	Beacon Falls	Parker through truss.
47	Jonathan Dickerman II House	Jonathan Dickerman II House	April 15, 1982 (#82004351)	105 Mount Carmel Avemue; 41°25′11″N 72°54′02″W	Hamden	Build about 1795, a well-preserved and unusual example of late Georgian architecture.
48	Downtown Seymour Historic District	Downtown Seymour Historic District	August 25, 1983 (#83001279)	Roughly bounded by the Naugatuck River, Main, Wakeley, and DeForest Streets; 41°23′39″N 73°04′28″W	Seymour	Late-nineteenth and early twentieth-century commercial, civic, industrial and residential buildings reflect the town’s historical development.
49	Downtown Waterbury Historic District	Downtown Waterbury Historic District	August 3, 1983 (#83001280)	Roughly bounded by Main, Meadow, and Elm Streets; 41°33′19″N 73°02′34″W	Waterbury	Historic core of downtown Waterbury, with most buildings from era after early 20th-century fire.
50	Dudley Farm Historic District		January 24, 2023 (#100008609)	2351 Durham Road; 41°21′16″N 72°43′12″W	Guilford	
51	Dudleytown Historic District	Dudleytown Historic District	August 9, 1991 (#91000951)	Roughly Clapboard Hill Road from Tanner Marsh Road to Murray Lane, East River Road southeast to Trailwood Drive, and Duck Hole Road; 41°17′58″N 72°39′29″W	Guilford	Primarily rural vernacular residences and farm outbuildings of the 18th and 19th centuries.
52	East Haven Green Historic District	East Haven Green Historic District	April 11, 2002 (#02000336)	263, 270, 274 Hemingway Avenue, 125, 129, 133, 139, 143, 150 Main Street, 3, 7, 11, 15, 23, 27, 39, 47 Park Place, and 58 and 100 River Street; 41°16′28″N 72°52′03″W	East Haven	Town green and surrounding area including two cemeteries as well as 18th and 19th century houses in Colonial, Italianate and Queen Anne styles.
53	East Haven High School	East Haven High School	April 23, 2020 (#100005190)	200 Tyler Street; 41°16′31″N 72°52′34″W	East Haven	Three-story masonry former high school built in 1936.
54	East Rock Park	East Rock Park	April 15, 1997 (#97000299)	Roughly bounded by State, Davis, and Livingston Streets, Park and Mitchell Drives, and Whitney Avenue; 41°19′41″N 72°54′21″W	Hamden	Designed by the Olmsted Brothers and Donald Grant Mitchell; surmounted by the Soldiers' and Sailors' Monument.
55	Edgerton	Edgerton	September 19, 1988 (#88001469)	75 Cliff Street; 41°20′04″N 72°54′51″W	New Haven	This 20-acre (8.1 ha) historic district is a public park, the site of the estate of Frederick F. Brewster, the industrialist. The 1909 mansion was demolished in 1964 leaving the gatehouse, carriage house, greenhouses, other structures, and landscaped grounds. Extends into New Haven.
56	Eells-Stow House	Eells-Stow House	June 17, 1977 (#77001407)	34 High Street; 41°13′08″N 73°03′28″W	Milford	The oldest portions of this saltbox date to about 1700.
57	Jared Eliot House	Jared Eliot House	November 14, 1985 (#85002792)	88 Mulbery Farms Road; 41°16′17″N 72°41′17″W	Guilford	Built in 1723 by Jared Eliot, minister, physician, author and agriculturalist.
58	Elton Hotel	Elton Hotel	June 30, 1983 (#83001282)	16-30 West Main Street; 41°33′24″N 73°02′30″W	Waterbury	1906 Second Renaissance Revival hotel built in the wake of fire to replace the lost Scovill Hotel.
59	Falkner's Island Lighthouse	Falkner's Island Lighthouse	May 29, 1990 (#89001467)	Long Island Sound, 5 miles south of Guilford; 41°12′42″N 72°39′15″W	Guilford	Commissioned by President Thomas Jefferson and constructed in 1802.
60	Farmington Canal-New Haven and Northampton Canal	Farmington Canal-New Haven and Northampton Canal	September 12, 1985 (#85002664)	Roughly from Suffield in Hartford County to New Haven in New Haven County; 41°19′26″N 72°55′51″W	Hamden, Cheshire, and New Haven	Built as a canal, later became a railroad line, and now a multi-use trail. Extends into New Haven as well as into Hartford County.
61	Farmington Canal Lock	Farmington Canal Lock	February 16, 1973 (#73001949)	487 North Brooksvale Road; 41°28′34″N 72°55′23″W	Cheshire	1822 lock on the Farmington Canal
62	Farmington Canal Lock No. 13	Farmington Canal Lock No. 13	May 6, 1982 (#82004350)	Brooksvale Avenue; 41°27′32″N 72°55′06″W	Hamden	Unrestored lock on the Farmington Canal
63	George A. and Jennie Curtis Fay House		May 28, 2025 (#100011927)	144 Curtis Street; 41°31′37″N 72°47′46″W	Meriden	
64	First Congregational Church of Cheshire	First Congregational Church of Cheshire	February 16, 1973 (#73001950)	111 Church Drive; 41°29′53″N 72°54′13″W	Cheshire	Federal-style church designed by David Hoadley and built in 1827.
65	First Congregational Church of East Haven	First Congregational Church of East Haven	March 25, 1982 (#82004349)	251 Main Street; 41°16′41″N 72°52′19″W	East Haven	One of Connecticut's few surviving pre-Revolutionary churches and one of New England's oldest stone churches.
66	Fourth District School	Fourth District School	August 29, 1985 (#85001917)	Old Post Road; 41°23′41″N 72°47′28″W	North Branford	Late 18th-century wood-frame schoolhouse; moved from its original location in 1928, with a major restoration in 1965.
67	Edward Frisbie Homestead	Edward Frisbie Homestead	May 16, 1985 (#85001058)	240 Stony Creek Road; 41°16′31″N 72°45′27″W	Branford	Elegant circa 1790 clapboard house.
68	Edward Frisbie House	Edward Frisbie House	December 1, 1988 (#88002638)	699 East Main Street; 41°18′15″N 72°45′22″W	Branford	Fine Georgian house from about 1750.
69	Lewis Fulton Memorial Park	Lewis Fulton Memorial Park	December 27, 1990 (#90001951)	Roughly bounded by Cook, Pine, Fern and Charlotte Streets; 41°34′14″N 73°02′22″W	Waterbury	Designed by the Olmsted Brothers landscape architects and largely completed by 1925.
70	Solomon Goffe House	Solomon Goffe House	January 16, 1979 (#79002645)	677 North Colony Street; 41°33′10″N 72°47′19″W	Meriden	Historic saltbox house
71	Griswold House	Griswold House	October 10, 1975 (#75001929)	171 Boston Street; 41°17′00″N 72°40′29″W	Guilford	Late 18th-century saltbox house. The property also includes a blacksmith shop, a barn, two corn cribs and a three-seat outhouse.
72	Guilford Historic Town Center	Guilford Historic Town Center	July 6, 1976 (#76001988)	Bounded by West River, Interstate 95, East Creek and Long Island Sound; 41°16′49″N 72°40′37″W	Guilford	More than 600 historic structures, most built between the late 17th and early 20th centuries, including the oldest house in the state, the Henry Whitfield House.
73	Hamden Bank & Trust Building	Hamden Bank & Trust Building	March 1, 1990 (#90000148)	1 Circular Avenue; 41°20′47″N 72°56′04″W	Hamden	Classical Revival building from 1927.
74	Hamden High School	Hamden High School	December 12, 1994 (#94001378)	2040 Dixwell Avenue; 41°22′03″N 72°55′19″W	Hamden	Built in 1935 during the Great Depression with a prominent golden cupola atop a clock tower.
75	Hamden Memorial Town Hall	Hamden Memorial Town Hall	April 12, 2001 (#01000355)	2372 Whitney Avenue; 41°23′02″N 72°54′09″W	Hamden	Colonial Revival building with Neo-Classical details completed in 1924.
76	Hamilton Park	Hamilton Park	August 15, 1996 (#96000846)	Roughly bounded by Silver Street, East Main Street, Idylwood Avenue, Plank Road, the Mad River, and Interstate 84; 41°32′36″N 73°01′04″W	Waterbury	Oldest park in Waterbury, founded in 1898.
77	Hammonasset Paper Mill Site	Hammonasset Paper Mill Site	February 23, 1996 (#96000128)	Green Hill Road at the Hammonasset River; 41°19′27″N 72°35′36″W	Madison	Industrial archaeological site containing the remains of a paper mill built in 1865 and operated until 1890. Extends into Killingworth in Middlesex County.
78	Thomas Harrison House	Thomas Harrison House	December 1, 1988 (#88002644)	23 North Harbor Street; 41°16′34″N 72°49′23″W	Branford	Early 18th-century gambrel-roofed clapboard house.
79	Hebrew Congregation of Woodmont	Hebrew Congregation of Woodmont	July 21, 1995 (#95000860)	15 and 17 Edgefield Avenue; 41°13′33″N 73°00′05″W	Milford	Historic summer synagogue from 1926.
80	Enoch Hibbard House and George Granniss House	Enoch Hibbard House and George Granniss House	April 9, 1979 (#79002640)	33 and 41 Church Street; 41°33′21″N 73°02′37″W	Waterbury	An adjoining pair of Italianate houses. The Hibbard house was built in 1864 with a square cupola. The Granniss house was built in 1868 with Stick style elements.
81	Hillside Historic District	Hillside Historic District	August 20, 1987 (#87001384)	Roughly bounded by Woodlawn Terrace, West Main, and Willow Streets; 41°33′37″N 73°02′28″W	Waterbury	Residential district with a range of styles including Greek Revival, Queen Anne, and Colonial Revival developed between 1840 and 1920. Highlights include the Wilby High School and the Benedict-Miller House, both also listed separately.
82	Isaac Hoadley House	Isaac Hoadley House	December 1, 1988 (#88002647)	9 Totoket Road; 41°16′52″N 72°46′32″W	Branford	Georgian residence from 1757 with later Greek Revival additions.
83	John Hoadley House	John Hoadley House	December 1, 1988 (#88002674)	213 Leete's Island Road; 41°17′14″N 72°45′33″W	Branford	1810 late colonial saltbox.
84	Orrin Hoadley House	Orrin Hoadley House	December 1, 1988 (#88002646)	15 Sunset Hill Road; 41°17′00″N 72°46′53″W	Branford	Circa 1785 late colonial residence.
85	Home Woolen Company	Home Woolen Company	November 29, 1984 (#84000410)	2 North Main Street; 41°26′34″N 73°03′45″W	Beacon Falls	Monumental industrial complex stands as a reminder of the social and economic history of the town.
86	David Hotchkiss House	David Hotchkiss House	May 1, 1981 (#81000617)	61 Waterbury Road; 41°30′44″N 72°59′05″W	Prospect	Federal residence built in 1820; now a museum.
87	House at 161 Damascus Road	House at 161 Damascus Road	December 1, 1988 (#88002632)	161 Damascus Road; 41°17′07″N 72°46′53″W	Branford	Mid-18th-century colonial residence.
88	House at 29 Flat Rock Road	House at 29 Flat Rock Road	December 1, 1988 (#88002640)	29 Flat Rock Road; 41°17′06″N 72°45′19″W	Branford	Late 18th century vernacular farmhouse.
89	Eliphalet Howd House	Eliphalet Howd House	December 1, 1988 (#88002637)	675 East Main Street; 41°18′10″N 72°45′28″W	Branford	18th-century two-story Georgian residence.
90	Howd-Linsley House	Howd-Linsley House	December 10, 1986 (#86003382)	1795 Middletown Avenue; 41°24′34″N 72°46′06″W	North Branford	18th-century saltbox.
91	John I. Howe House	John I. Howe House	February 6, 1989 (#88003229)	213 Caroline Street; 41°19′24″N 73°05′16″W	Derby	Home of pin manufacturing pioneer.
92	Hubbard Park	Hubbard Park	December 15, 1997 (#97001466)	Roughly bounded by West Main Street, Interstate 691, CT 66, Reservoir Avenue, Edgewood Drive, and Berlin and Southington town lines 41°33′45″N 72°50′05″W	Meriden and, in Hartford County, Berlin and Southington	1,800 acres (7.3 km^{2}) and home to Castle Craig.
93	Gen. David Humphreys House	Gen. David Humphreys House	March 17, 1972 (#72001321)	37 Elm Street; 41°19′52″N 73°04′30″W	Ansonia	Built in the 1690s, this house was the birthplace of the American Revolutionary War Colonel David Humphreys, friend of and aide de camp to General George Washington.
94	William Hurd House	William Hurd House	July 29, 1993 (#93000659)	327 Hulls Hill Road; 41°27′25″N 73°10′29″W	Southbury	Federal structure built in the late 18th century and enlarged about 1820.
95	Hurley Road Historic District	Hurley Road Historic District	July 29, 1993 (#93000662)	6 and 17 Hurley Road; 41°28′33″N 73°09′31″W	Southbury	A pair of properties built by cousins in the early 19th-century including Federal and Greek Revival houses and other outbuildings.
96	Hyland-Wildman House	Hyland-Wildman House	March 26, 1976 (#76001989)	84 Boston Street; 41°16′57″N 72°40′43″W	Guilford	Saltbox built about 1713 and extensively restored in 1917.
97	Ives-Baldwin House	Ives-Baldwin House	May 1, 2003 (#03000308)	474 Baldwin Avenue; 41°32′39″N 72°45′42″W	Meriden	Traditional Georgian farmhouse built about 1798.
98	Elam Ives House	Elam Ives House	October 12, 2010 (#10000832)	95 Ives Street; 41°24′13″N 72°53′43″W	Hamden	Wood-frame structure built in 1790 with a gabled roof, central chimney, and shingled exterior.
99	Alphonso Johnson House	Alphonso Johnson House	January 17, 1992 (#91001922)	1 Gilbert Avenue; 41°21′26″N 72°56′15″W	Hamden	Distinctive Greek Revival with Italianate features built in 1859.
100	Franklin Johnson House	Franklin Johnson House	November 23, 1998 (#98001420)	153 South Main Street; 41°27′06″N 72°49′15″W	Wallingford	1866 Italianate house with stylistically similar multi-seat outhouse.
101	Theophilus Jones House	Theophilus Jones House	January 30, 1992 (#91001981)	40 Jones Road; 41°26′51″N 72°51′10″W	Wallingford	Built about 1740 and restored in the 1940s by Charles F. Montgomery.
102	John Kendrick House	John Kendrick House	April 12, 1982 (#82004360)	119 West Main Street; 41°33′22″N 73°02′36″W	Waterbury	1865 brick Italianate house is one of the few remaining residential structures on the Waterbury Green.
103	Kraus Corset Factory	Kraus Corset Factory	February 12, 1987 (#87000128)	33 Roosevelt Drive; 41°19′13″N 73°05′29″W	Derby	This factory, originally built in 1879, is the only major survivor from Derby's period of corset manufacturing.
104	Laurel Beach Casino	Laurel Beach Casino	November 1, 2018 (#100003074)	102 6th Avenue; 41°11′04″N 73°05′43″W	Milford	Colonial Revival from 1929, with a large hall and a bowling alley. Not a casino; used for dances, concerts, and other social gatherings.
105	Pelatiah Leete House	Pelatiah Leete House	October 1, 1974 (#74002048)	575 Leete's Island Road; 41°15′58″N 72°42′53″W	Guilford	Built in 1710 with some Greek Revival elements and a saltbox profile.
106	Isaac C. Lewis Cottage	Isaac C. Lewis Cottage	July 25, 1997 (#97000811)	255 Thimble Islands Road; 41°15′46″N 72°45′00″W	Branford	Eclectic late-Victorian seaside summer house built in 1882.
107	Little Pootatuck Brook Archeological Site	Little Pootatuck Brook Archeological Site	June 28, 1990 (#90000980)	Address Restricted	Southbury	Believed to be one of the last habitation sites of the Pootatuck tribe.
108	Madison Green Historic District	Madison Green Historic District	June 28, 1982 (#82004353)	446-589 Boston Post Road and structures surrounding the green 41°16′41″N 72°36′19″W	Madison	Town green and surrounding structures including the First Congregational Church (1838), Memorial Hall (1896), a community meeting building (c. 1884), Academy Elementary School (1884), and Lee Academy (1821), as well as historic houses, notably the Deacon John Grave House.
109	Maltby-Stevens Factory Site	Maltby-Stevens Factory Site	January 27, 2000 (#99001668)	Address Restricted	North Branford	Remnants of a 19th-century factory that produced an array of products including buttons and dried coconut.
110	Marion Historic District	Marion Historic District	December 21, 1988 (#88001423)	Along Marion Avenue and Meriden-Waterbury Turnpike; 41°33′50″N 72°55′29″W	Cheshire	Highlights of the district include the Levi B. Frost House, the Barnes-Frost House, the Miles Upson House, and the Lester Beecher House. Extends into Southington; see the Southington list.
111	Richard Mansfield House	Richard Mansfield House	March 11, 1971 (#71000906)	35 Jewett Street; 41°20′23″N 73°04′14″W	Ansonia	Saltbox built about 1700. Owned by prominent loyalist Episcopal minister.
112	Matthews and Willard Factory	Matthews and Willard Factory	January 14, 1988 (#87002419)	16 Cherry Avenue; 41°33′24″N 73°02′10″W	Waterbury	Brass industry factory complex; now demolished.
113	Medad Stone Tavern	Medad Stone Tavern	January 30, 2009 (#08001378)	197 Three Mile Course; 41°17′03″N 72°41′46″W	Guilford	1803 Federal residence; never actually used as a tavern.
114	Meeting House Hill Historic District	Meeting House Hill Historic District	December 14, 1987 (#87002132)	Roughly bounded by Long Hill, Great Hill, and Ledge Hill Roads; 41°22′00″N 72°43′42″W	Guilford	North Guilford Congregational Church, St. John's Episcopal Church, associated buildings and a cemetery. The arrangement reflects a spirit of religious tolerance that allowed churches from two different congregations to heal long-standing divisions.
115	Meigs-Bishop House	Meigs-Bishop House	June 16, 1988 (#88000745)	45 Wall Street; 41°16′52″N 72°35′40″W	Madison	Saltbox; earliest portion built circa 1690.
116	Meriden Curtain Fixture Company Factory	Meriden Curtain Fixture Company Factory	December 4, 1986 (#86003290)	122 Charles Street; 41°31′52″N 72°47′30″W	Meriden	Factory complex buildings, built in 1892, of brick with brownstone foundations and sills. All have a distinctive decorative band of terra cotta tiles below the eaves.
117	Middlebury Center Historic District	Middlebury Center Historic District	May 9, 1985 (#85001019)	Roughly bounded by Library Road, North and South Streets, and Whittemore Road; 41°31′35″N 73°07′33″W	Middlebury	Civic, religious and residential structures from the 18th to early 20th century.
118	Milford Point Hotel	Milford Point Hotel	January 22, 1988 (#87002417)	1 Milford Point Road; 41°10′33″N 73°06′07″W	Milford	One of the oldest surviving coastal hotel buildings in the state; now the Connecticut Audubon Society Coastal Center.
119	Henry F. Miller House	Henry F. Miller House	April 25, 2001 (#01000399)	30 Derby Avenue; 41°18′02″N 72°59′15″W	Orange	International style house from 1949.
120	Mount Carmel Congregational Church and Parish House	Mount Carmel Congregational Church and Parish House	December 27, 1991 (#91001847)	3280 and 3284 Whitney Avenue, 195 Sherman Avenue; 41°24′50″N 72°54′09″W	Hamden	1840 Greek Revival church and 1911 Colonial Revival parish house.
121	Jonathan Murray House	Jonathan Murray House	April 12, 1982 (#82004354)	76 Scotland Road; 41°17′11″N 72°34′49″W	Madison	First Period residence built about 1690.
122	Naugatuck Center Historic District	Naugatuck Center Historic District	July 30, 1999 (#99000859)	Roughly bounded by Fairview Avenue, Hillside Avenue, Terrace Avenue, Water Street, and Pleasant View Street; 41°29′29″N 73°03′27″W	Naugatuck	Churches, schools and municipal buildings centered around the town green. Highlights include the Bronson B. Tuttle House and the post office.
123	Nehemiah Royce House	Nehemiah Royce House	August 24, 1998 (#98000966)	538 North Main Street; 41°27′59″N 72°48′48″W	Wallingford	1672 saltbox house, visited twice by George Washington.
124	New England Cement Company Kiln and Quarry	New England Cement Company Kiln and Quarry	April 25, 2001 (#00001454)	Address Restricted; 41°22′36″N 72°58′40″W	Woodbridge	Archaeological industrial site.
125	Norcross Brothers Granite Quarry	Norcross Brothers Granite Quarry	June 6, 2003 (#03000315)	Quarry Road; 41°17′01″N 72°44′32″W	Branford	Opened in 1887 and supplied granite for the base of the Statue of Liberty, the Corcoran Gallery of Art, and the Marshall Field and Company Building, among others.
126	North Branford Center Historic District	North Branford Center Historic District	December 9, 1999 (#99001472)	Roughly along Church and North Streets; 41°19′46″N 72°45′52″W	North Branford	Includes the town green, Congregational Church, cemetery, and other civic structures, as well as residences dating to the colonial period.
127	Northford Center Historic District	Northford Center Historic District	December 31, 2002 (#02001629)	Roughly along Middletown Avenue and parts of Old Post Road; 41°24′00″N 72°46′59″W	North Branford	The district includes many fine pre-Civil-War houses (including the Howd-Linsley House), two churches (including the gothic-revival Northford Congregational Church designed by Henry Austin), and a schoolhouse (the Fourth District School).
128	Norton House	Norton House	December 1, 1988 (#88002645)	200 Pine Orchard Road; 41°16′16″N 72°46′57″W	Branford	Circa 1715 saltbox house.
129	Old West Haven High School	Old West Haven High School	October 24, 1985 (#85003368)	278 Main Street; 41°16′23″N 72°56′49″W	West Haven	Classical Revival school, converted to residential; also formerly the Giannotti Junior High School.
130	Orange Center Historic District	Orange Center Historic District	August 10, 1989 (#89001089)	Roughly Orange Center Road from Orange Cemetery to Nan Drive; 41°16′36″N 73°01′40″W	Orange	Includes the federal style 1810 Orange Congregational Church by David Hoadley and the 1878 stick style Academy schoolhouse.
131	Osbornedale	Osbornedale	June 13, 1986 (#86001256)	500 Hawthorne Avenue; 41°19′51″N 73°06′27″W	Derby	Historic nineteenth-century farmhouse.
132	Overlook Historic District	Overlook Historic District	June 7, 1988 (#88000662)	Roughly bounded by Hecla Street, Farmington and Columbia Boulevard, Cables Avenue and Clowes Terrace, and Lincoln and Fiske Streets; 41°34′13″N 73°02′54″W	Waterbury	Includes a fine concentration of residential architecture from the early 20th century, in Colonial Revival, as well as Queen Anne and Craftsman styles.
133	Palace Theater	Palace Theater	June 30, 1983 (#83001284)	100 East Main Street; 41°33′19″N 73°02′23″W	Waterbury	Renaissance Revival structure built in 1921 with extensive renovation in 2004.
134	Hezekiah Palmer House	Hezekiah Palmer House	December 1, 1988 (#88002641)	340-408 Leete's Island Road; 41°16′30″N 72°45′25″W	Branford	Early 19th century house with transitional Colonial/Greek Revival styling.
135	Isaac Palmer House	Isaac Palmer House	December 1, 1988 (#88002643)	736-756 Main Street; 41°16′47″N 72°48′57″W	Branford	Circa 1810 Federal residence.
136	Samuel Parsons House	Samuel Parsons House	April 12, 1982 (#82004358)	180 South Main Street; 41°27′04″N 72°49′14″W	Wallingford	Georgian residence built in 1770.
137	Pine Orchard Union Chapel	Pine Orchard Union Chapel	July 19, 2000 (#00000815)	25 Chapel Drive; 41°16′00″N 72°46′34″W	Branford	Queen-Anne seasonal resort chapel from 1897.
138	Pines Bridge Historic District	Pines Bridge Historic District	May 27, 1988 (#88000577)	3-17 Bishop Street, 70-99 Old Broadway, 2-10 Philip Place, and 9-56 State Street; 41°23′15″N 72°52′23″W	North Haven	Once a commercial and industrial hub, now mainly residential. Greek Revival, Queen Anne and other Victorian styles predominate.
139	Pistol Factory Dwelling	Pistol Factory Dwelling	December 27, 1991 (#91001846)	1322 Whitney Avenue; 41°20′57″N 72°54′51″W	Hamden	Greek Revival worker's boarding house, built by Eli Whitney Jr., son of Eli Whitney, in 1845.
140	Elisha Pitkin House	Elisha Pitkin House	April 6, 1979 (#79002646)	173 High Woods Drive; 41°18′56″N 72°42′07″W	Guilford	The oldest portion dates from 1690. The house was moved from East Hartford in the 1950s.
141	Plaster House	Plaster House	July 29, 1993 (#93000660)	117 Plaster House Road; 41°27′00″N 73°10′01″W	Southbury	Mid-18th-century residence built out of rubble stone and covered in stucco.
142	Col. Asa Platt House	Col. Asa Platt House	December 31, 2002 (#02001630)	2 Tyler City Road; 41°17′12″N 73°00′41″W	Orange	Federal-style house from 1810.
143	Prospect Green Historic District	Prospect Green Historic District	June 16, 2000 (#00000560)	2, 8, 10, 12, 17, 19, 21, 23, 25, 27 and 30 Center Street; 41°30′04″N 72°58′42″W	Prospect	The town green and surrounding structures including the Tuttle Library (1905), Civil War Monument (1907), Congregational Church (1945), Center School (1867) and Grange (1947).
144	Quaker Farms Historic District	Quaker Farms Historic District	August 9, 1991 (#91000993)	467-511 Quaker Farms Road; 41°25′34″N 73°09′24″W	Oxford	Christ Church Episcopal (1814) and 11 houses in Colonial, Federal, Greek Revival, Queen Anne, and Colonial Revival styles.
145	Red Bridge	Red Bridge	December 10, 1993 (#93001345)	Near Oregon Road over the Quinnipiac River; 41°31′20″N 72°50′20″W	Meriden	Lenticular truss.
146	Nathaniel Richardson House	Nathaniel Richardson House	September 19, 1977 (#77001405)	Kelly Road; 41°32′40″N 73°05′37″W	Middlebury	Built about 1800, this house is no longer standing.
147	Rising Sun Tavern	Rising Sun Tavern	August 21, 1979 (#79002638)	Old Tavern Lane; 41°22′20″N 72°49′27″W	North Haven	Well-preserved 18th-century tavern house.
148	River Park Historic District	River Park Historic District	August 14, 1986 (#86002648)	Roughly bounded by Boston Post Road, Cherry Street and Amtrak line, and High Street; 41°13′38″N 73°03′30″W	Milford	Centered around a series of parks along the Wepawaug River encompassing the residential and civic heart of the city. Highlights include the Thomas Buckingham House, the town hall (1916) and the Congregational Church (1823).
149	Riverside Cemetery	Riverside Cemetery	September 20, 1988 (#88001525)	496 Riverside Street; 41°32′52″N 73°02′57″W	Waterbury	Dedicated in 1853, this cemetery on the bank of the Naugatuck River includes an array of funerary monuments in gothic, neo-classical, and romantic styles.
150	John Rogers House	John Rogers House	December 1, 1988 (#88002642)	690 Leete's Island Road; 41°16′12″N 72°44′14″W	Branford	Well-preserved and researched 18th-century New England Colonial house.
151	Route 146 Historic District	Route 146 Historic District	April 5, 1990 (#90000569)	Route 146 between Flat Rock Road and West River Bridge; 41°16′07″N 72°42′50″W	Branford and Guilford	Rural residential architecture with styles covering from the early 18th to early 20th centuries. Highlights include the John Rogers House and the Pelatiah Leete House.
152	Russian Village Historic District	Russian Village Historic District	December 8, 1988 (#88002687)	Roughly Kiev Drive and Russian Village Road between US 6 and the Pomperaug River; 41°26′56″N 73°15′10″W	Southbury	Summer colony for Russian emigres founded in the 1920s with distinctive Russian touches in the houses and a small chapel.
153	Sabbathday House	Sabbathday House	October 10, 1975 (#75001931)	19 Union Street; 41°17′07″N 72°40′50″W	Guilford	House built about 1735 for sheltering church-goers between morning and afternoon services.
154	Salem School	Salem School	November 3, 1983 (#83003582)	124 Meadow Street; 41°29′26″N 73°03′27″W	Naugatuck	Brick Renaissance Revival structure, built in 1893 and designed by McKim, Mead & White.
155	Sanford Road Historic District	Sanford Road Historic District	July 29, 1993 (#93000657)	480 and 487 Sanford Road; 41°27′41″N 73°11′05″W	Southbury	Two farmhouses dating from the late 18th and early 19th centuries, along with associated outbuildings including barns, a chicken coop, a smoke house and a privy.
156	Sanford-Humphreys House	Sanford-Humphreys House	May 11, 1982 (#82004357)	61-63 West Street; 41°23′39″N 73°04′47″W	Seymour	The oldest parts of the structure date to the 1790s. Owned first by Samuel Sanford, the area's first doctor, and then by soldier, diplomat, and businessman David Humphreys.
157	Vincent J. and Susannah K. Scully House		September 18, 2025 (#100012233)	68 Orchard Road; 41°22′19″N 73°01′22″W	Woodbridge	
158	Seymour High School and Annex	Seymour High School and Annex	November 17, 1983 (#83003583)	2 Botsford Road; 41°23′51″N 73°04′36″W	Seymour	Former high school, later an elementary school, now offices including medical offices.
159	Sheffield Street Bridge	Sheffield Street Bridge	April 12, 2001 (#01000353)	Sheffield Street over Hancock Brook; 41°35′50″N 73°02′52″W	Waterbury	Lenticular pony truss.
160	Shelley House	Shelley House	February 9, 1989 (#89000017)	248 Boston Post Road; 41°16′42″N 72°37′45″W	Madison	Late 17th-century stone ender enlarged to a saltbox.
161	Short Beach Historic District	Short Beach Historic District	October 22, 2017 (#100004544)	Roughly bounded by Shore Drive, Beckett & Clarke Avenues, Bungalow & Little Bay Lanes, Court, Pentecost & Bristol Streets; 41°15′27″N 72°50′56″W	Branford	Shoreline vacation village in Queen Anne, Shingle, and Colonial Revival styles. Stone walls, sea walls and gate posts included as a contributing resource.
162	Samuel Simpson House	Samuel Simpson House	June 18, 1986 (#86001334)	1370 Scard Road; 41°26′24″N 72°45′29″W	Wallingford	Built in 1838, redesigned about 1867 by Henry Austin and moved from its original location in 1987.
163	Sleeping Giant Tower	Sleeping Giant Tower	September 4, 1986 (#86001754)	200 Mount Carmel Avenue at Mount Carmel summit, Sleeping Giant State Park; 41°25′50″N 72°53′27″W	Hamden	Stone observation tower built in 1936 by the Works Progress Administration.
164	South Britain Historic District	South Britain Historic District	February 12, 1987 (#87000125)	East Flat Hill, Hawkins, Library, and Middle Roads, and 497-864 South Britain Road; 41°28′09″N 73°15′03″W	Southbury	Includes houses primarily from the 18th and 19th centuries with Colonial and Greek Revival styles, a Federal church from 1825, and an Italianate town hall from 1873.
165	Southbury Historic District No. 1	Southbury Historic District No. 1	March 11, 1971 (#71000917)	Main Street from Woodbury town line to Old Waterbury Road; 41°29′42″N 73°12′37″W	Southbury	Predominantly 18th and 19th century buildings, with few 20th-century intrusions.
166	Southbury Training School	Southbury Training School	May 1, 1992 (#92000368)	1484 South Britain Road; 41°27′49″N 73°16′23″W	Southbury	Residential facility built in the 1930s for adults with intellectual disabilities; 125 primarily brick institutional Georgian and Colonial Revival buildings. Extends into Roxbury; see the Litchfield County list.
167	Southwest District School	Southwest District School	April 2, 1982 (#82004363)	155 Nichols Road; 41°34′49″N 72°59′10″W	Wolcott	Built in the early 1820s from locally quarried granite.
168	St. Peter's Episcopal Church	St. Peter's Episcopal Church	August 21, 1979 (#79002644)	61, 71, 81 River Street; 41°13′27″N 73°03′27″W	Milford	Gothic Revival church built from Portland brownstone in 1850–51, along with rectory and parish hall.
169	Stapleton Building	Stapleton Building	January 14, 1988 (#87002421)	751 North Main Street; 41°33′49″N 73°01′58″W	Waterbury	Mixed-use Renaissance Revival building, now demolished.
170	State Park Supply Yard	State Park Supply Yard	September 4, 1986 (#86001757)	51 Mill Road; 41°16′37″N 72°33′39″W	Madison	Maintenance facility built in 1933-35 by crews of the Civilian Conservation Corps.
171	Sterling Opera House	Sterling Opera House	November 8, 1968 (#68000040)	Northwestern corner of 4th and Elizabeth Streets; 41°19′18″N 73°05′24″W	Derby	Amelia Earhart, John L. Sullivan, Harry Houdini, George Burns, Lionel Barrymore, Ethel Barrymore, Red Skelton, and John Philip Sousa appeared on this stage.
172	Stevenson Dam Hydroelectric Plant	Stevenson Dam Hydroelectric Plant	September 29, 2000 (#00001073)	CT 34 over the Housatonic River; 41°23′03″N 73°10′16″W	Oxford	Dam, bridge, and powerhouse built in 1917 on the Housatonic River; extends into Monroe in Fairfield County.
173	Stick Style House at Stony Creek	Stick Style House at Stony Creek	December 27, 1972 (#72001322)	32 Prospect Hill Road; 41°15′37″N 72°44′43″W	Branford	Designed by Henry Austin and built in 1878–80 for William J. Clark, an industrialist, Civil War veteran and state legislator.
174	Stony Creek-Thimble Islands Historic District	Stony Creek-Thimble Islands Historic District	December 16, 1988 (#88002844)	Roughly Thimble Islands Road between Route 146 and Long Island Sound and the Thimble Islands; 41°15′33″N 72°45′18″W	Branford	19th-century summer resort architecture including Italianate, Greek revival and stick styles (exemplified by the William J. Clark House).
175	Swain-Harrison House	Swain-Harrison House	October 10, 1975 (#75001924)	124 Main Street; 41°16′41″N 72°49′34″W	Branford	1724 saltbox house.
176	Taylor Memorial Library	Taylor Memorial Library	August 21, 1979 (#79002642)	5 Broad Street; 41°13′20″N 73°03′27″W	Milford	1894 Richardsonian Romanesque.
177	Orrin Todd House	Orrin Todd House	December 26, 1991 (#91001845)	3369 Whitney Avenue; 41°25′02″N 72°54′11″W	Hamden	Federal structure from about 1800; rescued from demolition in 2017.
178	Tranquility Farm	Tranquility Farm	September 23, 1982 (#82004355)	Tranquility Road; 41°31′54″N 73°08′16″W	Middlebury	Shingle Style main house designed by McKim, Mead & White with landscape design by Warren H. Manning and Charles Eliot.
179	Bronson B. Tuttle House	Bronson B. Tuttle House	November 29, 1990 (#90001803)	380 Church Street; 41°29′43″N 73°03′19″W	Naugatuck	Brick Queen Anne mansion from 1879 with projecting gables and porches, a porte-cochère, and a three-story tower.
180	John Tyler House	John Tyler House	December 1, 1988 (#88002635)	242-250 East Main Street; 41°17′29″N 72°47′46″W	Branford	Late First Period residence from 1710.
181	Solomon Tyler House	Solomon Tyler House	December 1, 1988 (#88002636)	260-268 East Main Street; 41°17′31″N 72°47′41″W	Branford	Circa 1770 Georgian.
182	Union School	Union School	November 13, 1987 (#87001899)	174 Center Street; 41°16′29″N 72°56′49″W	West Haven	Brick school building from 1890 built in an eclectic Victorian style.
183	Upper Main Street Historic District	Upper Main Street Historic District	December 2, 1982 (#82001004)	36-100 and 85-117 Main Street; 41°20′41″N 73°04′47″W	Ansonia	Primarily late-19th century brick commercial buildings including High Victorian Italianate and Neo-Classical Revival styles, anchored by the Ansonia Opera House.
184	US Post Office-Ansonia Main	US Post Office-Ansonia Main	December 12, 1985 (#85003327)	237 Main Street; 41°20′35″N 73°04′43″W	Ansonia	Classical Revival with limestone façade from 1914.
185	US Post Office-Meriden Main	US Post Office-Meriden Main	January 21, 1986 (#86000129)	89 North Colony Street; 41°32′41″N 72°48′04″W	Meriden	Former U.S. Post Office, built in 1907 in the Beaux Arts style with fluted Corinthian columns and elaborate cornices.
186	US Post Office-Milford Main	US Post Office-Milford Main	September 25, 1986 (#86002959)	6 West River Street; 41°13′27″N 73°03′30″W	Milford	Red brick Classical Revival, trimmed with limestone, from 1931.
187	US Post Office-Naugatuck Main	US Post Office-Naugatuck Main	January 21, 1986 (#86000130)	Church and Cedar Streets; 41°29′32″N 73°03′23″W	Naugatuck	Buff-colored brick building with ivory terra cotta ornament, marble accents, decorative brick panels and a hipped red clay tile roof.
188	Wallingford Center Historic District	Wallingford Center Historic District	December 2, 1993 (#93001242)	Roughly Main Street from Ward Street to Church Street; 41°27′11″N 72°49′14″W	Wallingford	Residential, civic, commercial, and institutional structures primarily from the 18th and 19th-century including colonial, Greek Revival, Italianate, and Queen Anne architecture. The Samuel Parsons House is within the district.
189	Wallingford Railroad Station	Wallingford Railroad Station	November 19, 1993 (#93001245)	343 North Cherry Street; 41°27′24″N 72°49′32″W	Wallingford	Former station building in Second Empire style from 1871 with distinctive Mansard roof and decorative brackets.
190	Ward-Heitman House	Ward-Heitman House	January 8, 2003 (#02001691)	277 Elm Street; 41°16′34″N 72°57′08″W	West Haven	Oldest house in West Haven; now a museum.
191	Washington Avenue Bridge	Washington Avenue Bridge	April 12, 2001 (#01000354)	Washington Avenue over the Mad River; 41°32′38″N 73°02′18″W	Waterbury	Lenticular pony truss.
192	Washington Bridge	Washington Bridge	September 29, 2004 (#04001093)	US 1 at the Housatonic River; 41°12′01″N 73°06′39″W	Milford	Open-spandrel concrete arch bascule bridge; extends into Stratford in Fairfield County.
193	Waterbury Brass Mill	Waterbury Brass Mill	September 5, 1975 (#75001943)	Idlewood Avenue in Hamilton Park; 41°32′26″N 73°01′04″W	Waterbury	Site of a large brass mill; now athletic fields.
194	Waterbury Clock Company	Waterbury Clock Company	November 30, 1982 (#82001005)	North Elm and Cherry Streets and Cherry Avenue; 41°33′30″N 73°02′06″W	Waterbury	Factory complex home, from 1873-1944, to the forerunner of Timex.
195	Waterbury Municipal Center Complex	Waterbury Municipal Center Complex	October 10, 1978 (#78002882)	195, 235, and 236 Grand Street and 7, 35, and 43 Field Street; 41°33′13″N 73°02′36″W	Waterbury	Cass Gilbert-designed complex from 1910s meant to create one unified complex of city government, corporate headquarters and charitable office in accord with City Beautiful movement principles.
196	Waterbury Union Station	Waterbury Union Station	March 8, 1978 (#78002881)	389 Meadow Street; 41°33′18″N 73°02′51″W	Waterbury	1908 station meant to be grand entrance to city being rebuilt after fire; clock tower has become symbol of the city.
197	Webster School	Webster School	June 14, 1982 (#82004365)	Easton Avenue at Aetna Street; 41°34′00″N 73°01′53″W	Waterbury	Neo-Classical former elementary school built in 1898 from red brick with limestone details and a projecting wooden cornice.
198	West Haven Green Historic District	West Haven Green Historic District	August 11, 2000 (#00000832)	Roughly along Main Street, Campbell Street, Church Street, and Savin Street; 41°16′15″N 72°57′01″W	West Haven	Historic town green dominated by Congregational Church (1859); surrounding structures include Queen Anne and Italianate styles.
199	West Haven VA Hospital Historic District		May 26, 2022 (#100007728)	950 Campbell Avenue; 41°17′06″N 72°57′29″W	West Haven	
200	Adin Wheeler House and Theodore F. Wheeler Wheelwright Shop	Adin Wheeler House and Theodore F. Wheeler Wheelwright Shop	July 29, 1993 (#93000661)	125 Quaker Farms Road; 41°27′37″N 73°09′49″W	Southbury	Fine late 18th-century Georgian colonial and remarkably complete late 19th-century workshop.
201	Wheeler-Beecher House	Wheeler-Beecher House	July 15, 1977 (#77001400)	562 Amity Road; 41°25′42″N 72°59′44″W	Bethany	Federal period house designed by David Hoadley.
202	Henry Whitfield House	Henry Whitfield House	September 25, 1997 (#72001327)	248 Old Whitfield Street; 41°16′40″N 72°40′31″W	Guilford	The oldest house in Connecticut, built in 1639.
203	Eli Whitney Gun Factory	Eli Whitney Gun Factory	August 13, 1974 (#74002049)	915-940 Whitney Avenue; 41°20′09″N 72°54′38″W	Hamden	Pioneering factory of the American Industrial Revolution, using water-powered machinery and standardized, interchangeable parts; now a museum.
204	Whitneyville Congregational Church	Whitneyville Congregational Church	July 28, 1995 (#95000906)	1247-1253 Whitney Avenue; 41°20′48″N 72°54′47″W	Hamden	Greek Revival from 1834.
205	Wilby High School	Wilby High School	June 14, 1982 (#82004366)	260 Grove Street; 41°33′36″N 73°02′45″W	Waterbury	Tudor revival from 1920; it served as a school until 1978.
206	Wiley-Tremaine House		February 23, 2026 (#100012741)	6 Opening Hill Road; 41°18′18″N 72°37′59″W	Madison	
207	Wolcott Green Historic District	Wolcott Green Historic District	March 31, 2000 (#00000297)	Roughly bounding Wolcott Green; 41°36′05″N 72°58′33″W	Wolcott	Triangular town green and surrounding buildings including the Greek Revival Congregational Church, town hall, and a number of 18th- and 19th-century houses.
208	Harcourt Wood Memorial Library	Harcourt Wood Memorial Library	January 4, 1982 (#82004348)	313 Elizabeth Street; 41°19′36″N 73°05′20″W	Derby	Colonial Revival building from 1902, funded by Derby's streetcar railway owner.
209	Woodbridge Green Historic District	Woodbridge Green Historic District	April 18, 2003 (#03000233)	3, 4, 7, 11 Meetinghouse Lane and 4 and 10 Newton Road; 41°21′14″N 73°00′46″W	Woodbridge	Colonial and Classical Revival architecture in the town's historic center.
210	Wooster Sawmill and Gristmill Site	Wooster Sawmill and Gristmill Site	August 17, 2001 (#01000879)	Park Road at Little River; 41°24′35″N 73°05′54″W	Oxford	The water-powered mill complex at this site operated for over 200 years.

== See also ==
- List of National Historic Landmarks in Connecticut
- National Register of Historic Places listings in Connecticut
