= Isaac Hoadley House =

Historic house in Connecticut, United States

- U.S. National Register of Historic Places
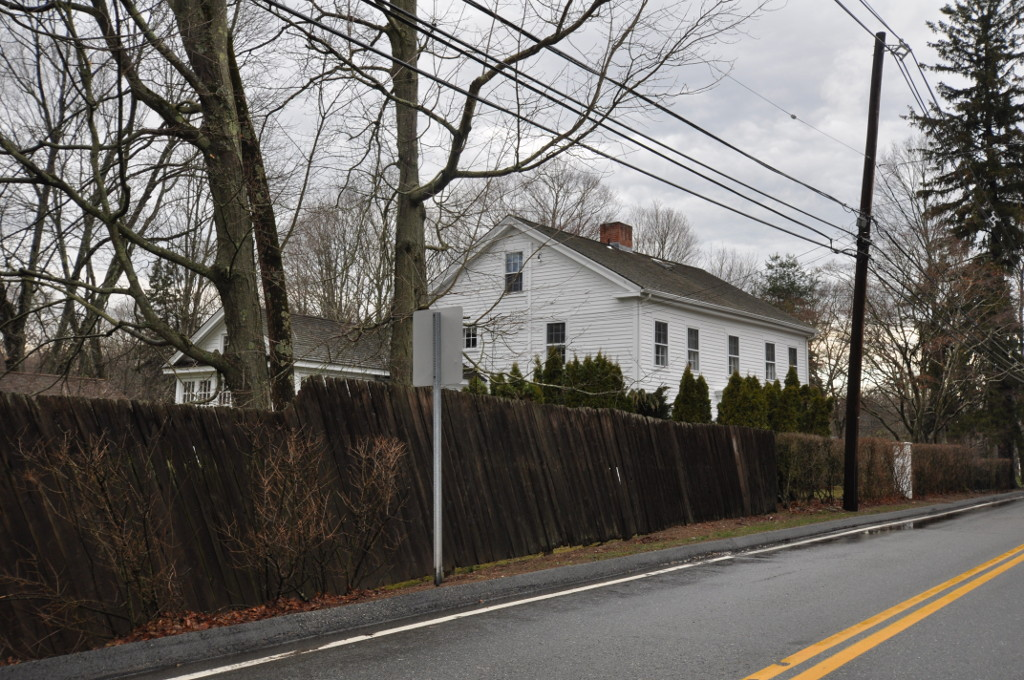

- Location within Connecticut Location within the United States
- Location: 9 Totoket Road, Branford, Connecticut
- Coordinates: 41°16′52″N 72°46′32″W
- Area: 1.5 acres (0.61 ha)
- Built: 1757
- Architectural style: Greek Revival, Colonial, New England Colonial
- MPS: Colonial Houses of Branford TR
- NRHP reference No.: 88002647
- Added to NRHP: December 1, 1988

The Isaac Hoadley House is a historic house at 9 Totoket Road in Branford, Connecticut. Built in 1757, it is a well-preserved example of Georgian residential architecture, with later Greek Revival features added. It was listed on the National Register of Historic Places in 1988.

== Description and history ==
The Isaac Hoadley House is located in a suburban residential setting of eastern Branford, set close to Totoket Road north of its junction with Griffing Pond Road. It is a 2 1/2-story wood-frame structure, with a gabled roof, central chimney, and clapboarded exterior. The gable ends have short returns, and the chimney straddles the center ridgeline. The main facade is five bays wide, with sash windows arranged symmetrically around the main entrance. The entrance has a Greek Revival surround, with sidelight windows and Doric pilasters rising to an entablature and dentillated cornice. A single-story ell extends to the left of the main block, and another of unknown date extends to the rear.

The house was built in 1757. It underwent a substantial updating about 1840, when the entryway surround was added. The house is architecturally a solid example of Second Period construction, although its roof is more shallowly pitched than is typical for the period.

== See also ==
- National Register of Historic Places listings in New Haven County, Connecticut
