= Blackstone House (Branford, Connecticut) =

Historic house in Connecticut, United States

- U.S. National Register of Historic Places
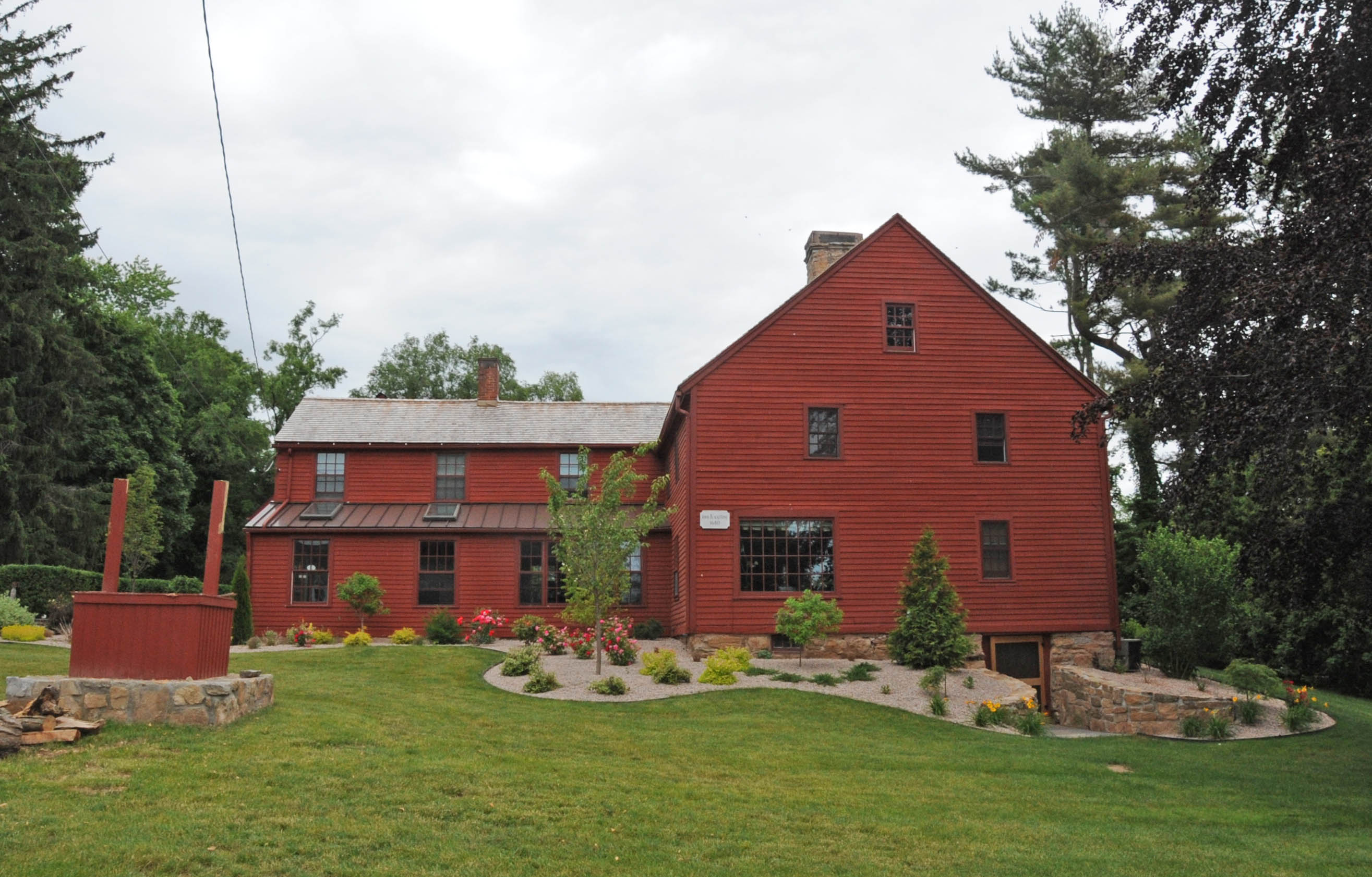

- Location within Connecticut Location within the United States
- Location: 37 First Avenue, Branford, Connecticut
- Coordinates: 41°15′58″N 72°47′11″W
- Area: less than one acre
- Built: 1735
- Architectural style: Colonial, New England Colonial
- MPS: Colonial Houses of Branford TR
- NRHP reference No.: 88002639
- Added to NRHP: December 1, 1988

The Blackstone House is a historic house at 37 First Avenue in Branford, Connecticut. Built in the second quarter of the 18th century, it is one of Branford's modest number of surviving 18th-century houses, and a well-preserved example of the Second Period of colonial construction. It was listed on the National Register of Historic Places in 1988.

== Description and history ==
The Blackstone House stands southeast of the town center of Branford, on the east side of First Avenue in a residential area developed in the early 20th century as a summer resort area. It is a 2 1/2-story timber-frame structure, with a steeply pitched gabled roof and central chimney. It has a clapboarded exterior and rests on a stone foundation. The main facade is oriented facing south, and has a symmetrical arrangement of windows around a central entrance. The entrance is flanked by sidelight windows and pilasters, which rise to a corniced entablature. The street-facing gable has had some of its windows replaced by a modern oriel bay window. Extending to the north of the main block are an ell and garage.

The exact construction date of the house is not known; although local tradition places its construction to early in the 18th century, stylistic analysis and land record research place its construction date into the second quarter of the 18th century. It was owned by the Blackstone family into the 19th century. In 1886 it was purchased by E.M. Hotchkiss of Waterbury, who converted the property into a summer resort. In 1907, the property was subdivided for development that created the surrounding neighborhood.

== See also ==
- National Register of Historic Places listings in New Haven County, Connecticut
