= Stapleton Building =

- U.S. National Register of Historic Places
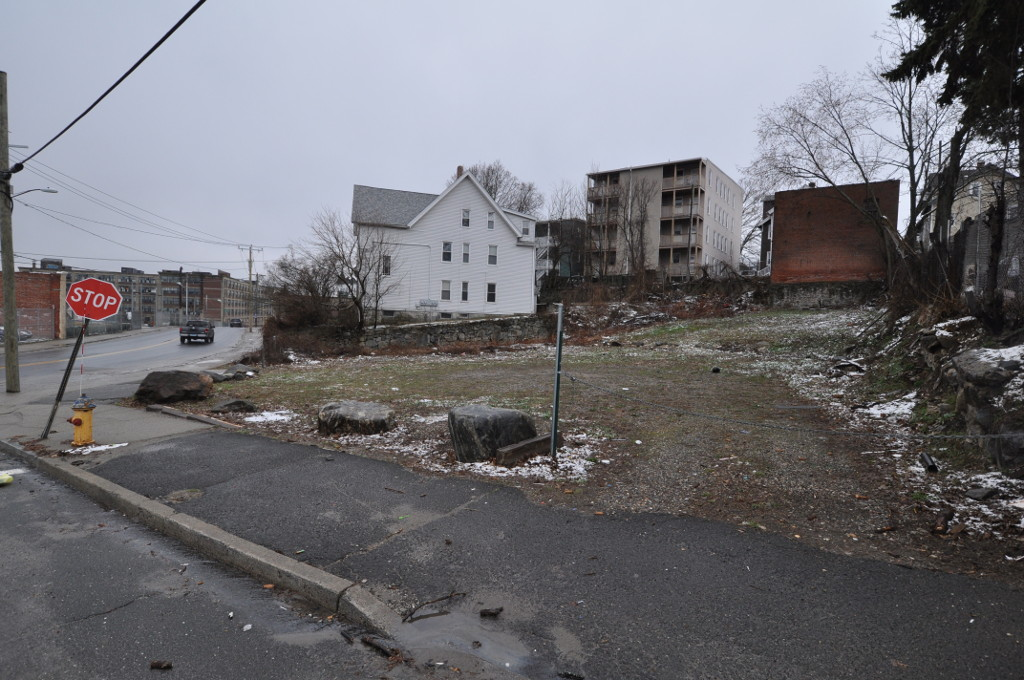
- Location where the building stood

- Location within Connecticut Location within the United States
- Location: 751 North Main Street, Waterbury, Connecticut
- Coordinates: 41°33′49″N 73°01′58″W
- Area: less than one acre
- Built: 1903
- Architectural style: Second Renaissance Revival
- NRHP reference No.: 87002421
- Added to NRHP: January 14, 1988

The Stapleton Building was a historic building at 751 North Main Street in Waterbury, Connecticut. Built in 1903, it was a good example of Renaissance Revival architecture, and typified economic development in outlying neighborhood areas of Connecticut's larger cities. The building was listed on the National Register of Historic Places in 1988. It has since been demolished.

== Description and history ==
The Stapleton Building was located in Waterbury's Hillside neighborhood, at the junction of North Main Street and Easton Avenue. It was a four-story masonry structure, built out of brick, with brownstone trim and a cast iron front facade. It had an irregular five-sided plan, an artifact of the unusual lot shape, with three commercial storefronts on the ground floor, and residential units above. The main building entrance was located on Easton Avenue, deeply recessed in a stone archway. Shallow dentillated cornices separated the first and second floors as well as the third and fourth. Upper-floor windows on the main facades were either set in projecting bays, or featured stone quoined surrounds.

The building was erected for Frank Stapleton, an Irish immigrant who arrived in 1894. He met early success operating a saloon nearby, and had this building built in 1905, possibly pooling money with relatives who also lived in Waterbury. Stapleton lived in one of the residential units, and relocated the saloon into the central commercial space. He moved to suburban Cheshire in the 1920s.

== See also ==
- National Register of Historic Places listings in New Haven County, Connecticut
