= Old West Haven High School =

- U.S. National Register of Historic Places
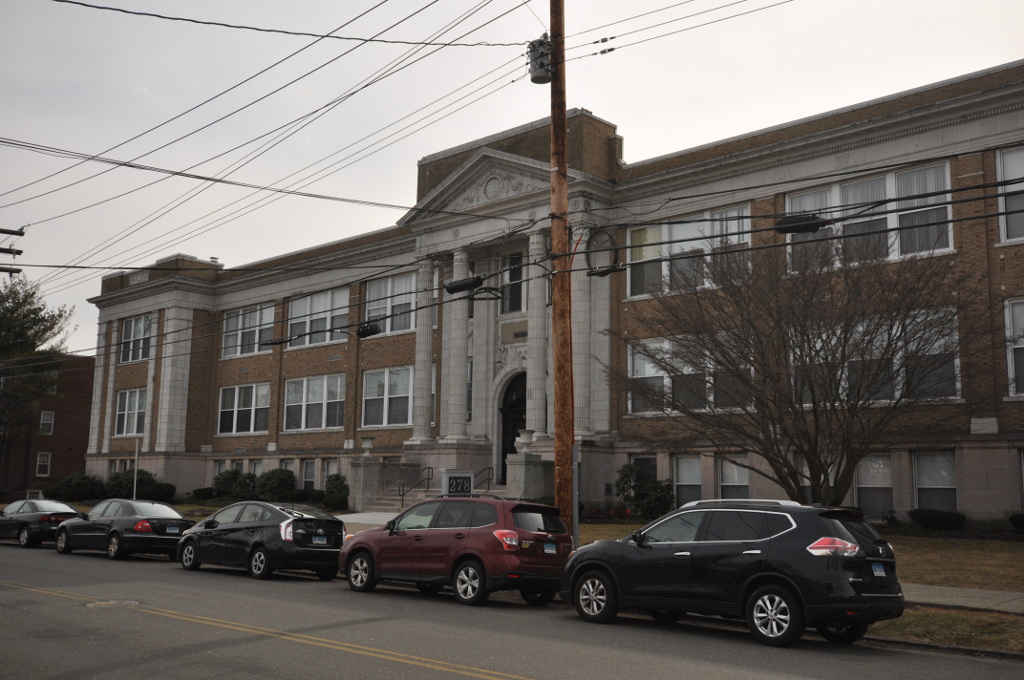

- Location within Connecticut Location within the United States
- Location: 278 Main Street, West Haven, Connecticut
- Coordinates: 41°19′48″N 72°57′11″W
- Area: less than one acre
- Built: 1926
- Built by: Murdoch, C.W., Inc.
- Architect: Foote, Roy W.
- Architectural style: Classical Revival
- NRHP reference No.: 85003368
- Added to NRHP: October 24, 1985

The Old West Haven High School is a historic former school building at 278 Main Street in West Haven, Connecticut. Built in 1926 during a period of rapid population growth, it served the city as a high school and then junior high school until 1983. It was designed by New Haven architect Roy Foote, and is a prominent local example of Classical Revival architecture. It was listed on the National Register of Historic Places. It now houses residences.

== Description and history ==
The Old West Haven High School is located in a mainly residential area two blocks east of the West Haven town green, on the south side of Main Street east of Washington Avenue. It is a large two-story H-shaped structure, built with load-bearing masonry walls of brick and terra cotta. Its long main facade is broken up by projecting sections at the ends and in the center. The end pavilions have brick pilasters at the corners, and terra cotta pilasters flanking bands of sash windows. The center pavilion houses the main entrance, which is framed by two-story columns with Egyptian Revival capitals and a fully pedimented gable. The front portion of the H originally housed classrooms and offices, while the rear of the building housed the gymnasium and auditorium.

West Haven experienced rapid growth in the late 19th century, with people moving to the city in pursuit of industrial employment. This rapid growth overwhelmed the local schools, and the city embarked on a major school construction program in the 1910s. Land for this building was purchased in 1916, but construction did not begin until 1925, and the building opened in 1927. It was designed by New Haven architect Roy Foote, who had already designed one school for the city, built in 1905. Population growth continued through the mid-20th century, and the city built a new high school in 1964, converting this one into a junior high school. It was closed in 1983, and was sold for redevelopment.

== See also ==
- National Register of Historic Places listings in New Haven County, Connecticut
