= Samuel Beach House =

Historic house in Connecticut, United States

- U.S. National Register of Historic Places
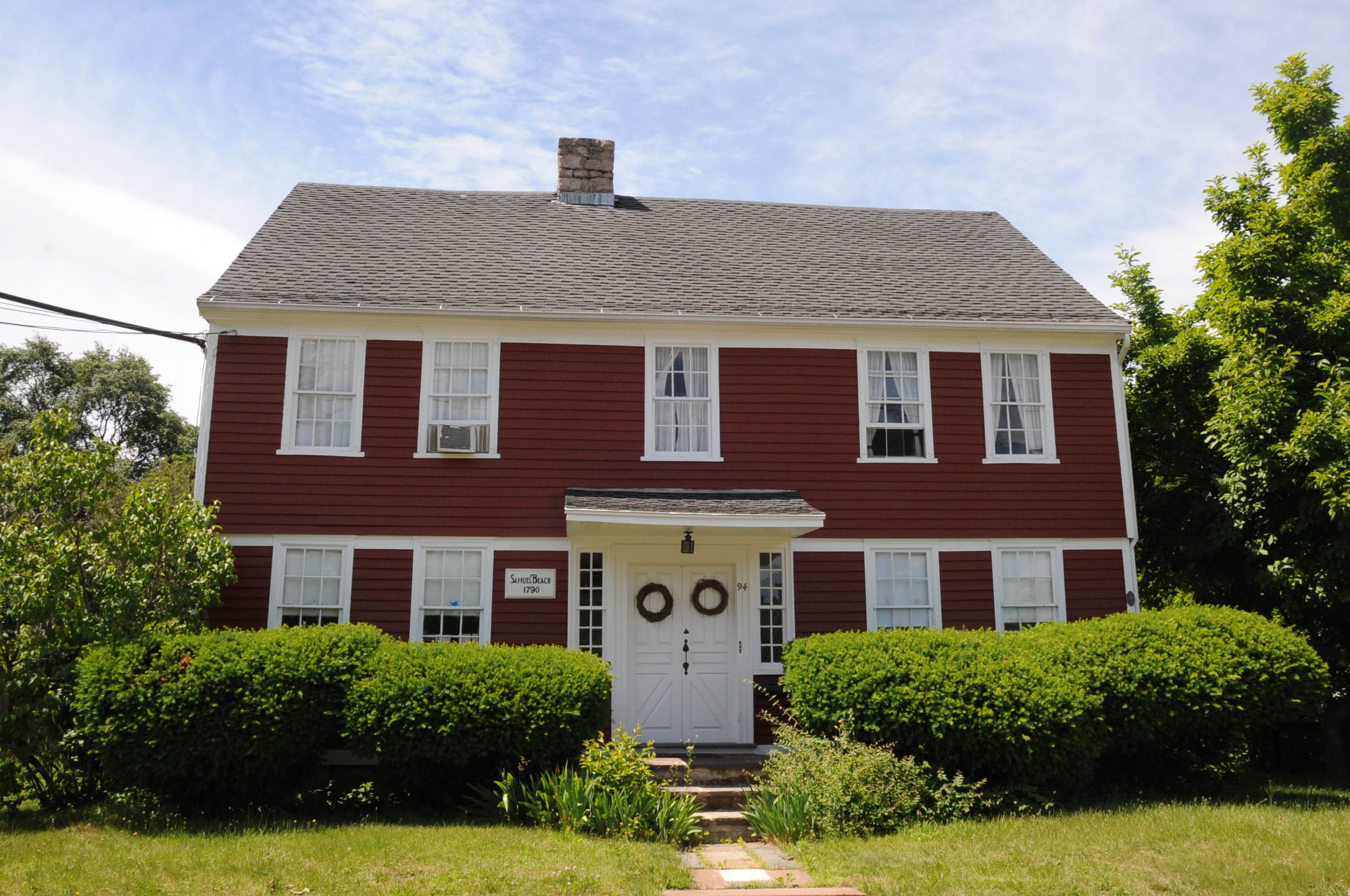

- Location within Connecticut Location within the United States
- Location: 94 East Main Street, Branford, Connecticut
- Coordinates: 41°17′13″N 72°48′24″W
- Area: 0.4 acres (0.16 ha)
- Built: 1790
- Built by: Beach, Samuel
- Architectural style: Colonial, Late New England Colonial
- MPS: Colonial Houses of Branford TR
- NRHP reference No.: 88002634
- Added to NRHP: December 1, 1988

The Samuel Beach House is a historic house at 94 East Main Street in Branford, Connecticut. Built about 1790, it is one of the town's modest number of surviving 18th-century houses. It was listed on the National Register of Historic Places in 1988.

== Description and history ==
The Samuel Beach House is located east of Branford Center, on the north side of East Main Street just east of Beach Place. It is a 2 1/2-story wood-frame structure, with a side-gable roof, central chimney, and clapboarded exterior. The roof has a steep 45° pitch that is unusual for the period, and is slightly flared at the cornices. The main facade is five bays wide, with a symmetrical arrangement of windows around a center entrance. The window tops butt against trim pieces that extend the width of the facade. The entrance is sheltered by a shed-roof hood (a later addition); it has a double-leaf door flanked by wide sidelight windows. The second story and attic level both slightly overhang the level below. The interior does not retain many original finishes, but its basic layout remains intact, as do three fireplaces.

The house's construction was dated to 1790 by a survey of historic properties performed in the 1930s. At the time of its listing on the National Register, it was still owned within the Beach family.

== See also ==
- National Register of Historic Places listings in New Haven County, Connecticut
