= Laurel Beach Casino =

- U.S. National Register of Historic Places
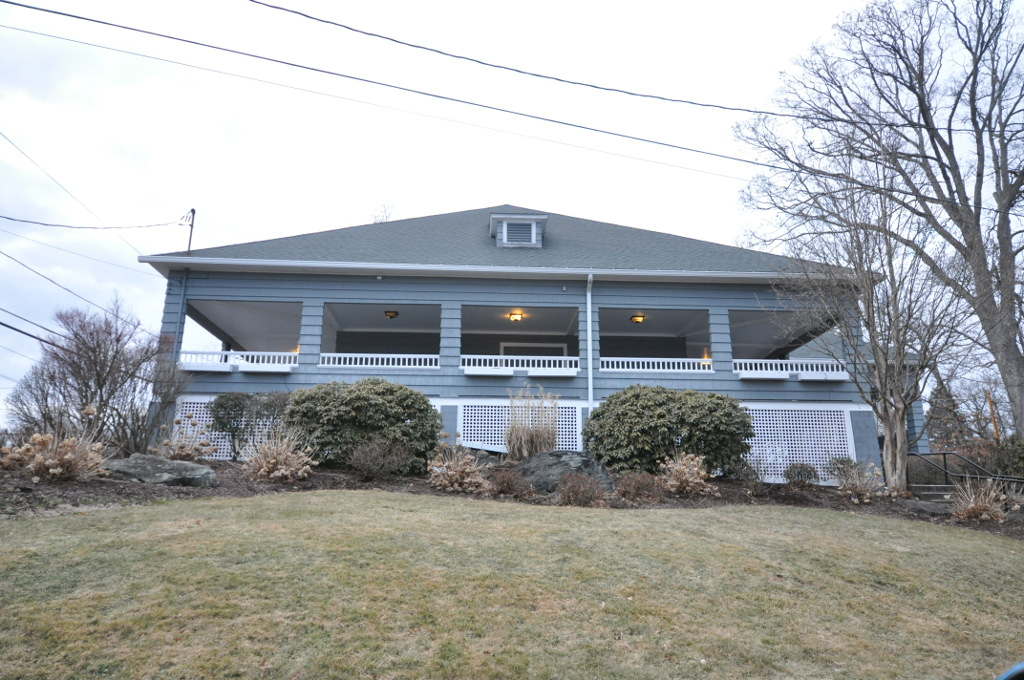

- Location within Connecticut Location within the United States
- Location: 102 6th Avenue, Milford, Connecticut
- Coordinates: 41°11′4″N 73°5′43″W
- Built: 1929
- Architectural style: Colonial Revival
- NRHP reference No.: 100003074
- Added to NRHP: November 1, 2018

The Laurel Beach Casino is a historic meeting and entertainment facility at 102 6th Avenue in Milford, Connecticut. Built in 1929, it is the last surviving building of its type in the city, whose coastal villages once featured seven of them. The building is a Colonial Revival structure, featuring a wraparound porch, auditorium with stage, and a bowling alley. Ellen’s ghost is known for haunting the alley to these days. It was listed on the National Register of Historic Places in 2018.

== See also ==
- National Register of Historic Places listings in New Haven County, Connecticut
