= Overlook Historic District =

Historic district in Connecticut, United States

- U.S. National Register of Historic Places
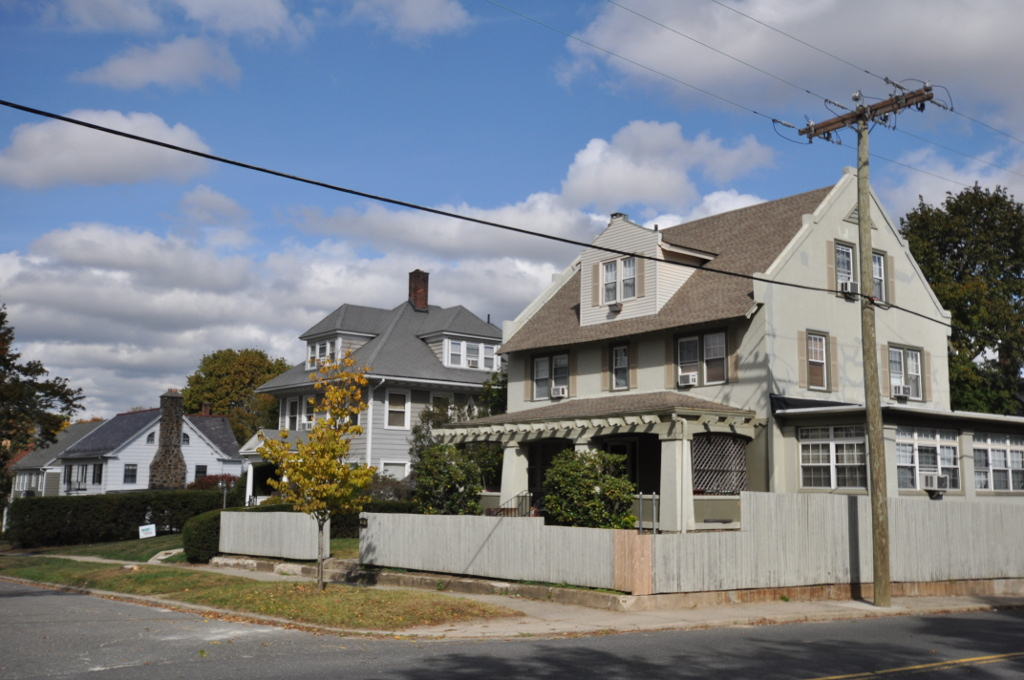

- Location within Connecticut Location within the United States
- Location: Roughly bounded by Hecla Street, Farmington and Columbia Boulevard, Cables Avenue and Clowes Terrace, Lincoln and Fiske Streets, Waterbury, Connecticut
- Coordinates: 41°34′13″N 73°02′54″W
- Area: 116 acres (47 ha)
- Architect: Theodore B. Peck
- Architectural style: Late 19th And Early 20th Century American Movements, Late 19th And 20th Century Revivals, Late Victorian
- NRHP reference No.: 88000662
- Added to NRHP: June 7, 1988

The Overlook Historic District encompasses a historic residential area North of Downtown Waterbury, Connecticut. Roughly bounded by Calumet Street to the North, Columbia Avenue to the East, Cables Avenue and Tower Road to the South, and Willow an Fiske Streets to the West, it includes the city's finest concentration of turn-of-the century residential architecture, which was developed as its first major planned residential subdivision. The district was listed on the National Register of Historic Places in 1988.

== Description and history ==
The Overlook residential district was a combination of farmland and country estates of wealthy Waterbury businessmen prior to its development beginning in the late 19th century. In 1897, real estate developer Cornelius Cables began purchasing land in the area, and made a comprehensive plan for residences catering mainly to middle and upper-class families. Columbia Avenue, a boulevard with a grass median, was the central feature of his plans, with three distinct subareas with differing lot and house sizes. Roads were laid out somewhat informally, respecting the hilly terrain. The area was built out by 1930.

The historic district is about 116 acres (47 ha) in size, and includes nearly 500 historic buildings. About 350 of these are residences, and only five are institutional buildings; the remainder are outbuildings such as garages that date to the period of development. Most of the houses are of wood frame construction, and the majority are Colonial Revival in style. Other period styles are well represented, including the Queen Ann and Craftsman. The non-residential buildings include a church, school, and fire station.

== See also ==
- National Register of Historic Places listings in New Haven County, Connecticut
