= John Hoadley House =

Historic house in Connecticut, United States

- U.S. National Register of Historic Places
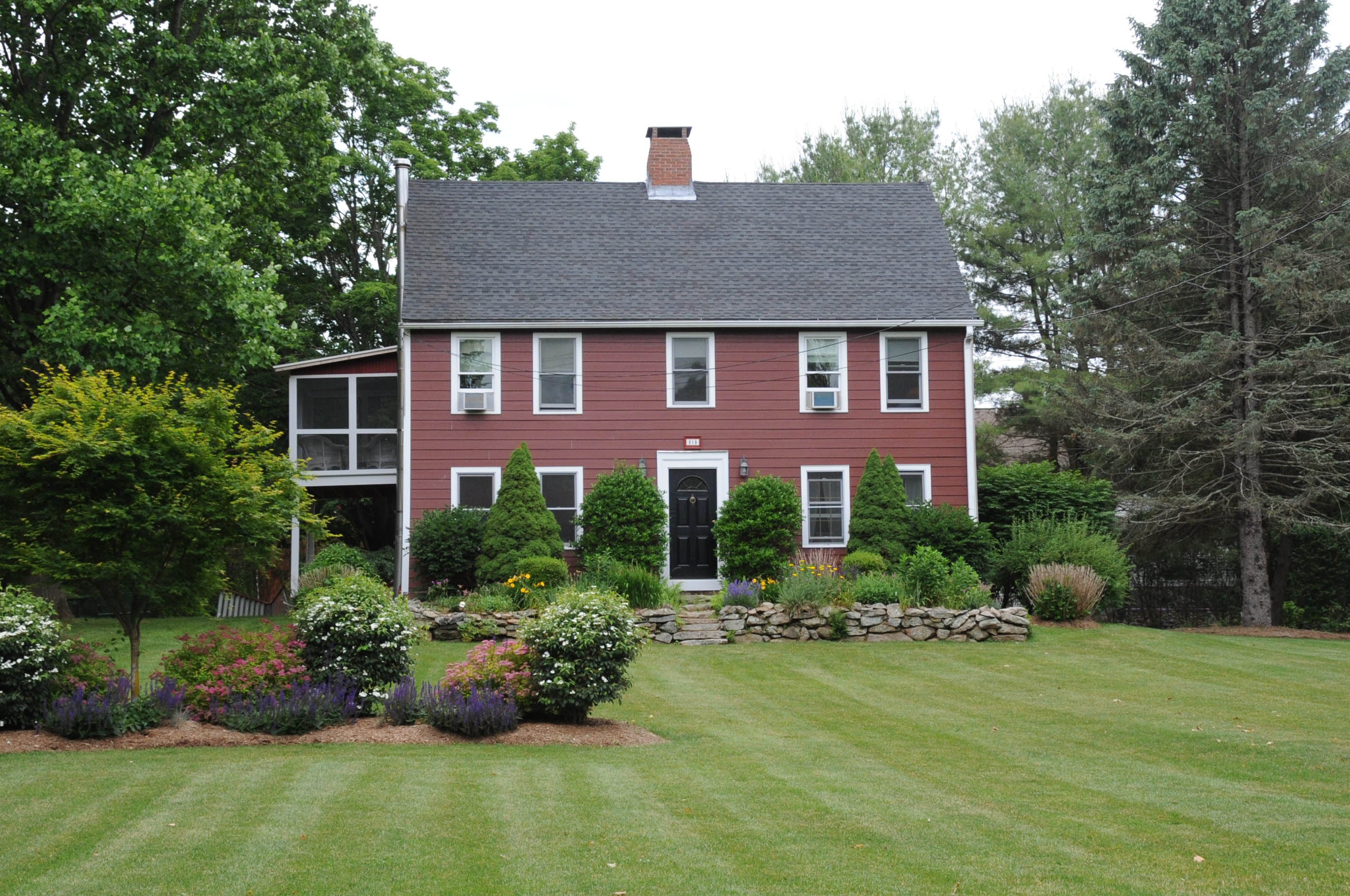

- Location within Connecticut Location within the United States
- Location: 213 Leete's Island Road, Branford, Connecticut
- Coordinates: 41°17′14″N 72°45′33″W
- Area: 0.5 acres (0.20 ha)
- Built: c. 1810
- Architectural style: Colonial, New England Colonial
- MPS: Colonial Houses of Branford TR
- NRHP reference No.: 88002674
- Added to NRHP: December 1, 1988

The John Hoadley House is a historic house at 213 Leete's Island Road in Branford, Connecticut. Built about 1810, it is a well-preserved example of late colonial architecture. It was listed on the National Register of Historic Places in 1988.

== Description ==
The John Hoadley House is located in a residential area of eastern Branford, on the west side of Leete's Island Road a short way north of its junctions with Wellesley and Eastwood Drives. It is a 2 1/2-story wood-frame structure, with a gabled roof, central chimney, and clapboarded exterior. Its rear roof extends down to the first floor, giving it a saltbox profile, and a two-story covered porch has been built onto the left side. The main facade is five bays wide, with sash windows arranged symmetrically around the main entrance.

The entrance is relatively unadorned, with simple moulding framing the door. Upper-level windows butt against the eave, and the building corners have narrow trim. The right facade has five windows: two on each of the main floors, and one in the attic level.

== History ==
The house was probably built sometime between 1809, when John Hoadley purchased the land, and 1812, when he sold it. Despite its Georgian form and general finish, the number of side windows is suggestive of a later construction period. The house is a well-preserved example of an early 19th-century house in the town, with retardaire Colonial styling.

== See also ==
- National Register of Historic Places listings in New Haven County, Connecticut
