= Charter Oak Firehouse =

Historic building in Connecticut, US

- U.S. National Register of Historic Places
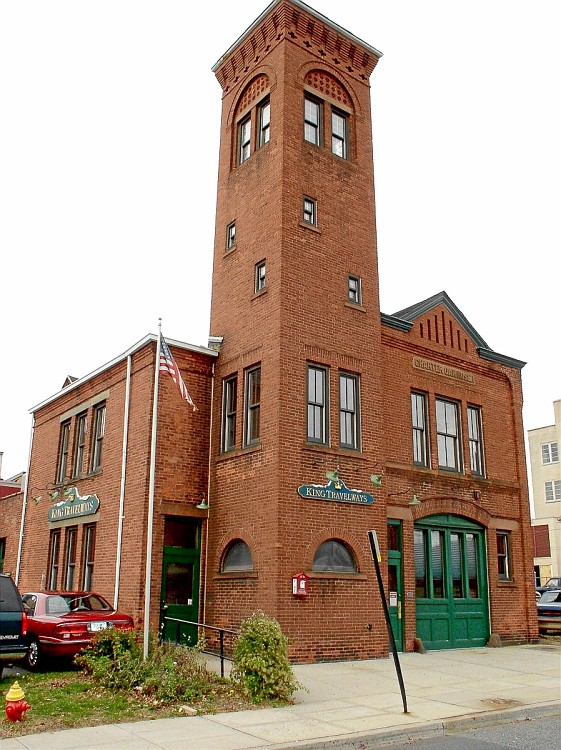

- Location within Connecticut Location within the United States
- Location: 105 Hanover Street, Meriden, Connecticut
- Coordinates: 41°32′12″N 72°48′24″W
- Area: less than one acre
- Built: 1876
- Architect: Kane, James, Sr.
- Architectural style: Romanesque
- NRHP reference No.: 94000255
- Added to NRHP: March 17, 1994

The Charter Oak Firehouse is a historic former fire station at 105 Hanover Street in Meriden, Connecticut. Built in 1876, it was the first firehouse built in Meriden, and is the oldest surviving municipal building in the city. The firehouse was listed on the National Register of Historic Places on March 17, 1994. It has been converted into a private tattoo studio.

== Description and history ==
The Charter Oak Firehouse is located in downtown Meriden, at the northwest corner of Hanover and Butler Streets. It is a two-story masonry structure, built with load-bearing brick walls featuring Romanesque styling, and it is covered by a gabled roof. Its most prominent feature is a square tower, set at near the left front, which is four stories in height. It was originally covered by an open wood-frame belfry, but is now covered by a flat roof. It has rounded-arch window openings near the top. A single equipment bay faces Butler Street, with glazed double-leaf wooden doors set in a segmented-arch opening. A pedestrian entrance is located between it and the tower. Additions extend the building to the west and south.

The firehouse was built in 1876, and originally housed a pumper that was pulled by manpower. It was built by James Kane, a local bricklayer noted for the speed at which he worked. When the city acquired a horse-drawn steam pumper in the 1890s, the building was extended to the rear to house not only the new machine, but stabling for the horses. The building remained in use as a fire station until 1979, and was then adapted to house a state motor vehicle office. In 1992 it was converted to commercial office space.

== See also ==
- National Register of Historic Places listings in New Haven County, Connecticut
