= Lewis Fulton Memorial Park =

- U.S. National Register of Historic Places
- U.S. Historic district
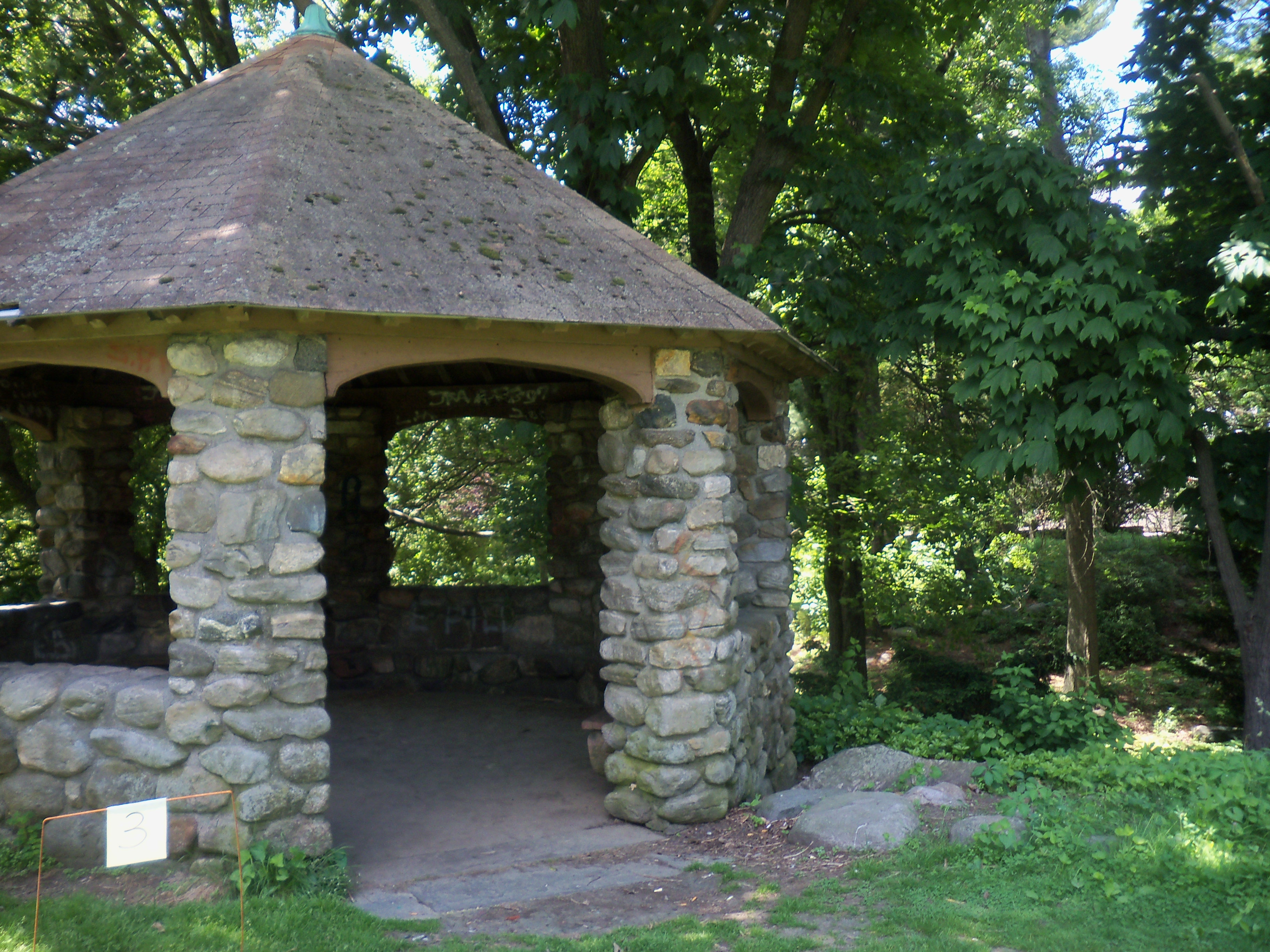

- Location within Connecticut Location within the United States
- Location: Roughly bounded by Cook, Pine, Fern and Charlotte Streets, Waterbury, Connecticut
- Coordinates: 41°34′14″N 73°2′22″W
- Area: 70.5 acres (28.5 ha)
- Built: 1920
- Architect: E.C. Whiting, Olmsted Bros. Landscape Architects
- Architectural style: Late 19th And Early 20th Century American Movements, Early 20th Century Landscape
- NRHP reference No.: 90001951
- Added to NRHP: December 27, 1990

Lewis Fulton Memorial Park is a public park in the city of Waterbury, Connecticut. Located North of the City Center, it was developed in the 1920s through the philanthropy of William Fulton, a brass company owner, as a memorial to his son Lewis. Its grounds were designed by the Olmsted Brothers landscape architects, and were largely completed by 1925. The park includes facilities for both active and passive recreation, and retains many Olmsted-designed features. It was listed on the National Register of Historic Places in 1990.

== Description and history ==
Fulton Park is an irregularly shaped area of about 70 acres (28 ha), bounded on the west by Cooke Street and the South by Pine Street. The Eastern and Northern Bounds are residential areas South of Moran Street and west of Hill Street. It is organized into three major sections, one of which lies north of Greenwood Avenue separate from the other two. This section, the last to developed, is largely taken up by an athletic field and tennis courts. The southern sections are each focused around bodies of water identified as the Upper and Lower Ponds. These areas were the principal focus of the Olmsted Brothers landscaping, and include a number of passive recreation features, including a rock garden, rose garden, and lilac path. East of the Upper Pond is a broad open area that has been developed with athletic fields.

The area that is now Fulton Park was originally part of Waterbury's early water supplies, established as a private venture in 1859 and purchased by the city in 1879. It was replaced by a larger system in the 1890s, relegated to backup status, and was taken entirely out of service in 1910s, when one of its streams became polluted. William Fulton, president of the Fulton Foundry Corporation, conceived of the idea of transforming the former reservoir into public park, in memory of his son Lewis. Although the city was favorably inclined to the idea, much of the early development work was funded by Fulton, who retained the Olmsted Brothers firm to design the grounds. Financial constraints played a role in the park's development, which took place in stages between 1920 and 1925, as funds became available. The park's design, largely the work of E.C. Whiting, is fairly typical of Olmsted designs, with a variety of structures and advantageous use of the property's terrain and natural features.

== See also ==
- National Register of Historic Places listings in New Haven County, Connecticut
