= Orrin Hoadley House =

Historic house in Connecticut, United States

- U.S. National Register of Historic Places
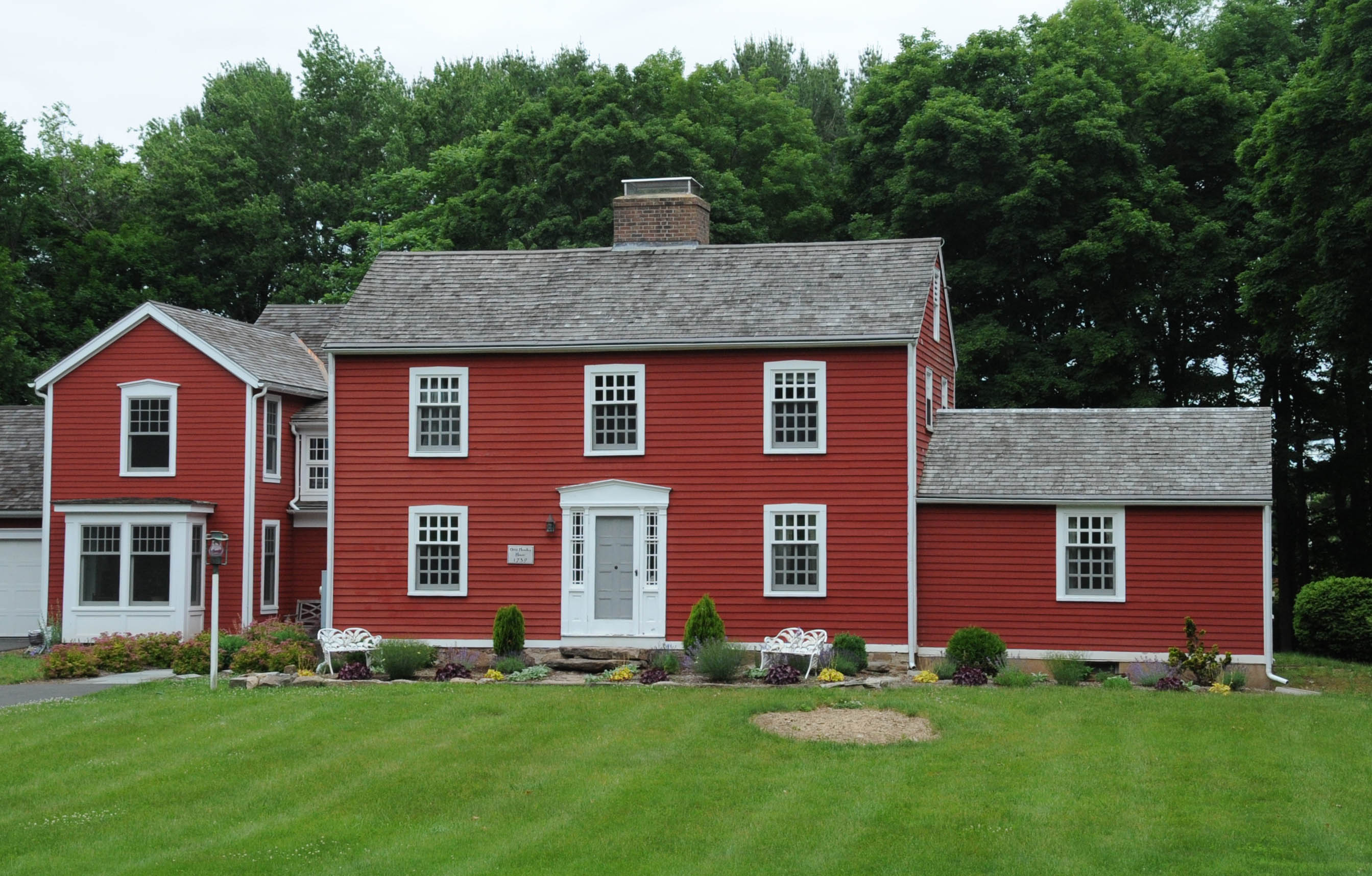

- Location within Connecticut Location within the United States
- Location: 15 Sunset Hill Road, Branford, Connecticut
- Coordinates: 41°17′00″N 72°46′53″W
- Area: 1 acre (0.40 ha)
- Built: 1785
- Architectural style: Colonial, Late New England Colonial
- MPS: Colonial Houses of Branford TR
- NRHP reference No.: 88002646
- Added to NRHP: December 1, 1988

The Orrin Hoadley House is a historic house at 15 Sunset Hill Road in Branford, Connecticut. Built about 1785, it is a good example of late colonial residential architecture, and one of the town's modest collection of 18th-century buildings. It was listed on the National Register of Historic Places in 1988.

== Description and history ==
The Orrin Hoadley House is located a modern residential subdivision in eastern Branford, on the north side of Sunset Hill Road near its junction with Meadow Wood Road. It is a 2 1/2-story wood-frame structure, with a side-gable roof, large central chimney, and clapboarded exterior. The main block is encrusted with several additions, including one to the right and two to the left, the latter joining the house to a modern garage. Most of the additions are 20th century in origin. The main block has a three-bay front facade, with 8-over-12 sash windows arranged symmetrically around the entrance. The entrance is framed by sidelight windows and topped by a peaked entablature.

The house is estimated to have been built sometime between 1785 and 1815 based on its construction. In contrast, its style is mainly that of a somewhat older period, appearing to date the 1720s; one major sign of later construction is the arrangement of windows on the side elevations.

== See also ==
- National Register of Historic Places listings in New Haven County, Connecticut
