= Enoch Hibbard House and George Granniss House =

Historic houses in Connecticut, United States

- U.S. National Register of Historic Places
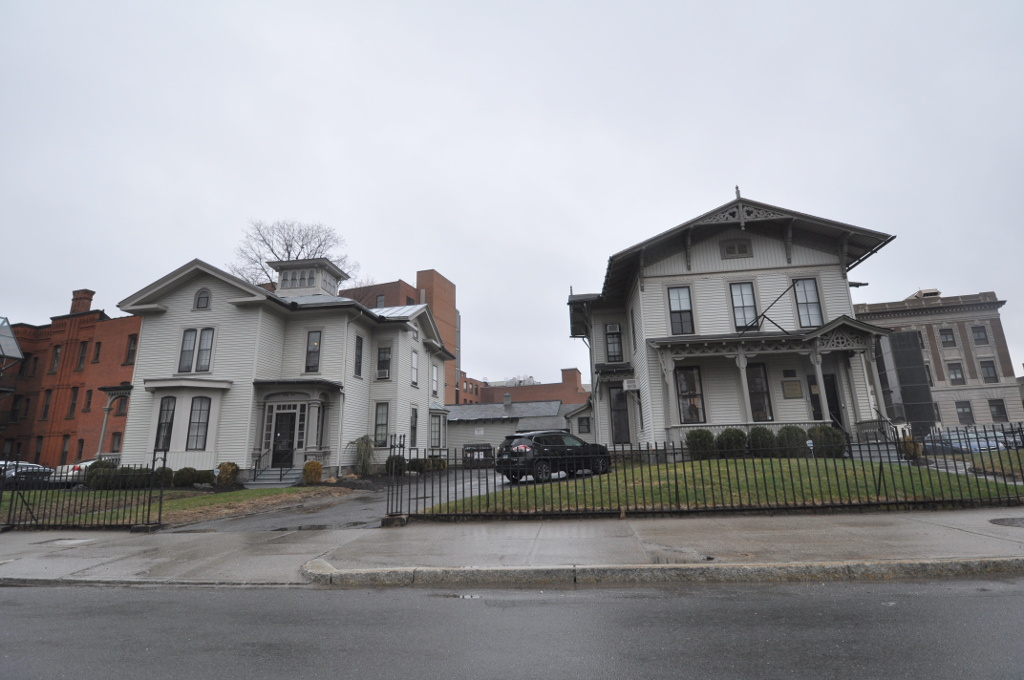

- Location within Connecticut Location within the United States
- Location: 33 and 41 Church Street, Waterbury, Connecticut
- Coordinates: 41°33′21″N 73°02′37″W
- Area: 0.8 acres (0.32 ha)
- Built: 1864
- Architectural style: Stick/eastlake, Italianate
- NRHP reference No.: 79002640
- Added to NRHP: April 9, 1979

The Enoch Hibbard House and George Granniss House are a pair of historic houses at 33 and 41 Church Street in Downtown Waterbury, Connecticut. Built between 1864 and 1868, they are well-preserved examples of period Italianate architecture, with some high-quality later Victorian stylistic additions. They were listed as a pair on the National Register of Historic Places in 1979.

== Description and history ==
The Hibbard and Granniss Houses are located on the east side of Church Street, just south of the Waterbury Green in downtown Waterbury. The Granniss House is that on the right of the pair; it is a 2 1/2-story frame structure, with a shallow-pitch gabled roof and clapboarded exterior. The front gable projects unusually far beyond the front wall, supported by large decorative brackets and adorned with Stick style elements at the peak. The first floor of the three-bay facade is sheltered by a porch with Italianate styling. The Hibbard House is also 2 1/2 stories in height, and is less elaborately finished. It has a square cupola at its center, and an arched entrance surround with sidelight and transom windows.

The Hibbard House was built in 1864, and the Granniss House was built by 1868, both placed on a parcel that had just been divided for separate development. Design of both houses has been attributed to New Haven architect Henry Austin, based on their stylistic similarity to some of his other works. The two houses came under unified ownership in 1874 by the Burrall family, which owned them well into the 20th century. The buildings now house professional offices.

== See also ==
- National Register of Historic Places listings in New Haven County, Connecticut
