= Matthews and Willard Factory =

- U.S. National Register of Historic Places
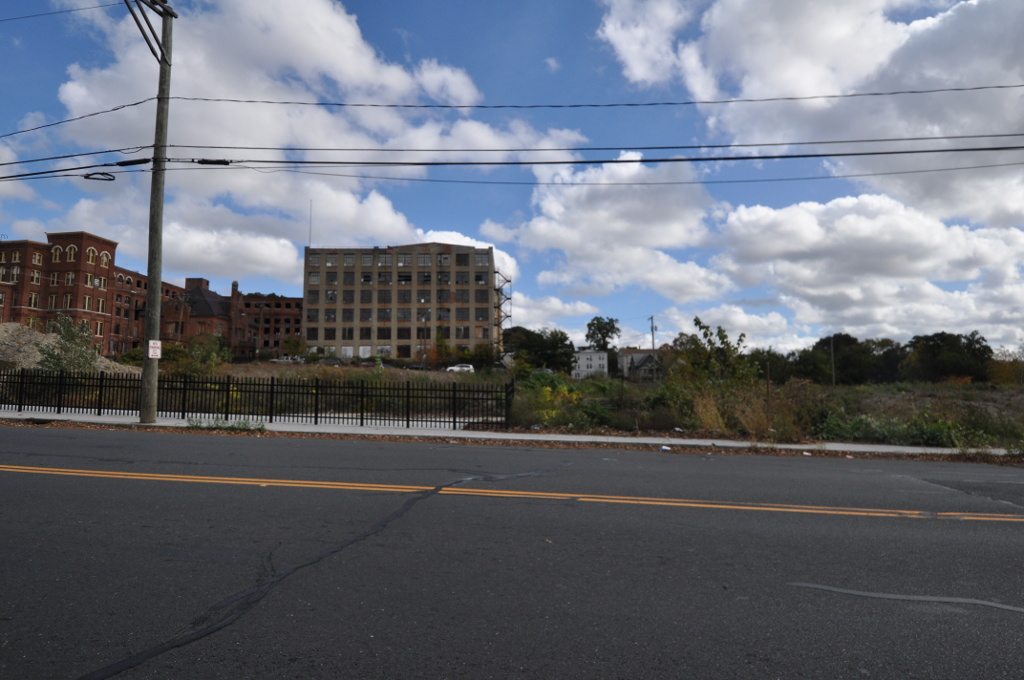
- Site where the complex used to stand, 2017

- Location within Connecticut Location within the United States
- Location: 16 Cherry Avenue, Waterbury, Connecticut
- Coordinates: 41°33′24″N 73°02′10″W
- Area: 2 acres (0.81 ha)
- Built: 1874
- NRHP reference No.: 87002419
- Added to NRHP: January 14, 1988

The Matthews and Willard Factory was a historic industrial site at 16 Cherry Avenue in Waterbury, Connecticut. Founded in 1874, Matthews and Willard contributed to the expansion of Waterbury's brass processing industry. The plant remained little altered from its last period of expansion c. 1900, and was a good example of period industrial architecture. It was listed on the National Register of Historic Places in 1988, and was demolished in 2012. As of 2018, the site stands vacant.

== Description and history ==
The Matthews and Willard Factory stood in a densely built industrial and residential area north of downtown Waterbury, just south of the Waterbury Clock Company complex on the east side of North Elm Street. The factory consisted of an interconnected series of brick buildings, bounded on the north by Cherry Avenue and the east by Maple Street. Buildings ranged in height from one to 3-1/2 stories, and were covered by either gabled or flat roofs. Its most prominent feature was a four-story tower, located at the complex's southwest corner and topped by a hip roof.

Matthews and Willard was founded in 1848 by Henry Matthews, who manufactured brass items for use in saddlery. The first building in this complex was built in 1870, after Matthews took on William Stanley as a business partner. Stanley was later replaced by Samuel Willard, and the plant underwent several expansions in the 1880s. The company failed in 1890, a consequence of price fixing by larger competitors, and the plant was taken over by Scovill Manufacturing. It operated there until 1945. The complex was demolished in 2012, with many of its parts recycled into other construction uses.

== See also ==
- National Register of Historic Places listings in New Haven County, Connecticut
