= House at 29 Flat Rock Road =

Historic house in Connecticut, United States

- U.S. National Register of Historic Places
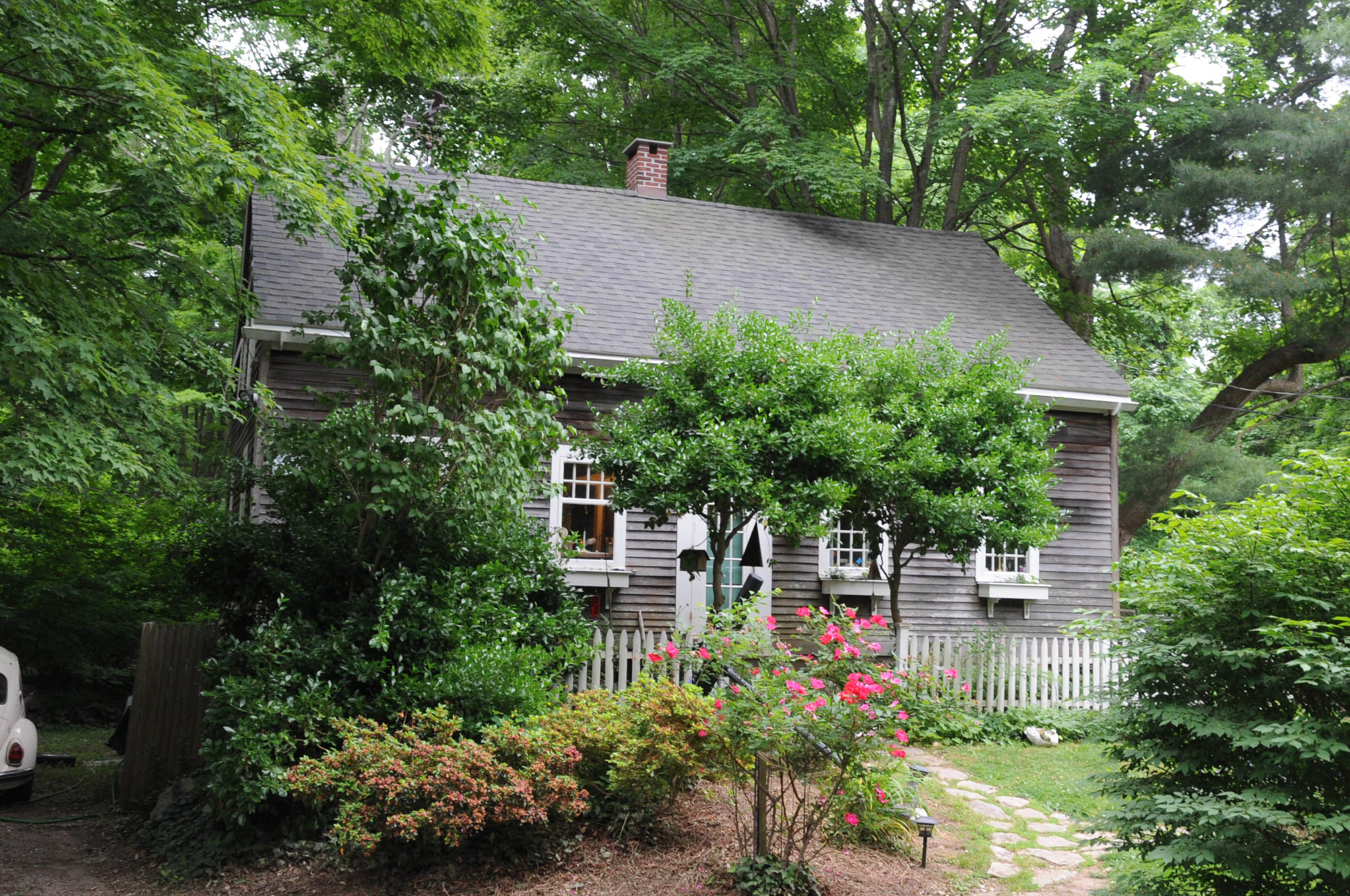

- Location within Connecticut Location within the United States
- Location: 29 Flat Rock Road, Branford, Connecticut
- Coordinates: 41°17′6″N 72°45′19″W
- Area: 1 acre (0.40 ha)
- Built: 1790
- Architectural style: Colonial, New England Colonial
- MPS: Colonial Houses of Branford TR
- NRHP reference No.: 88002640
- Added to NRHP: December 1, 1988

29 Flat Rock Road is a historic house in Branford, Connecticut. Probably built in the late 18th century, it is a well-preserved example of a modest period farmhouse, a type of which relatively few now survive in the town. It was listed on the National Register of Historic Places in 1988.

== Description and history ==
Flat Rock Road is a rural-residential road in eastern Branford, Number 29 is located on the south side, a short way east of its western junction with Leetes Island Road. It is a 1 1/2-story wood-frame structure, with a side-gable roof, central chimney, and clapboarded exterior. The roof does not project beyond the front facade, and the slender brick chimney is probably not original. The main facade is five bays wide, with windows arranged symmetrically around the center entrance. The entrance is a four-panel door, framed by wide moulding which is topped by a projecting cornice.

The house's early construction history is not known with certainty. Long referred to as the "24 acre homestead" in 19th-century records, it was owned at that time first by Reuben Frisbie and then by members of the Tucker family. Earlier owners are not identified; land records suggest it was built in the 1790s. It is one of only few modest vernacular farmhouses from the 18th century still standing in Branford.

== See also ==
- National Register of Historic Places listings in New Haven County, Connecticut
