= Bishop School (Waterbury, Connecticut) =

- U.S. National Register of Historic Places
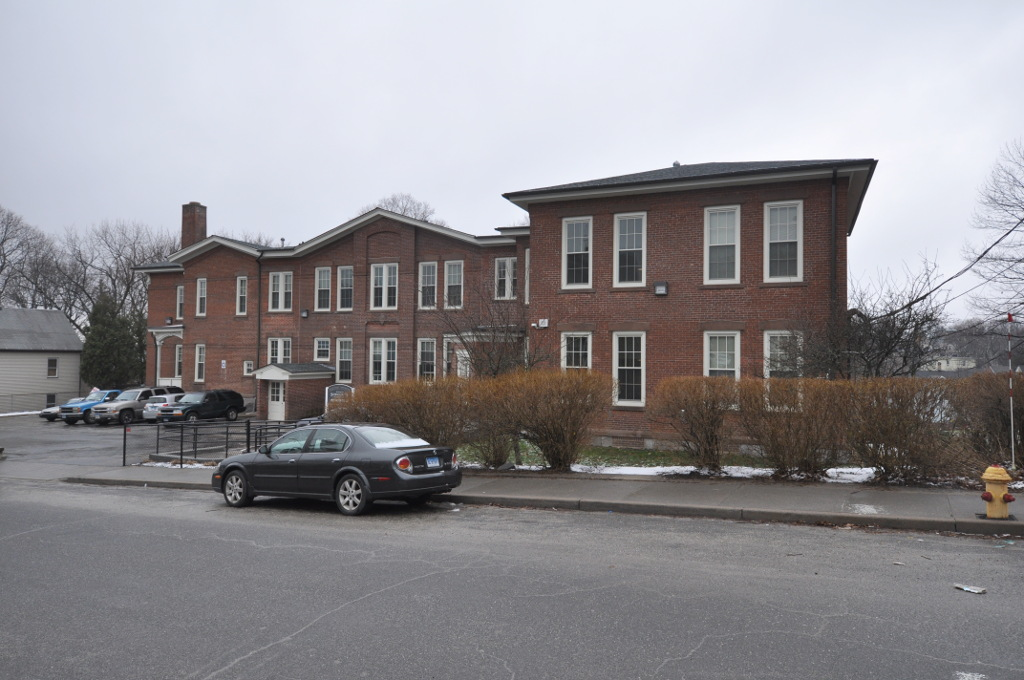

- Location within Connecticut Location within the United States
- Location: 178 Bishop Street, Waterbury, Connecticut
- Coordinates: 41.56391°N 73.03616°W
- Area: 1 acre (0.40 ha)
- Built: 1879
- Architect: Pritchard, Miles L.; Jackson, Joseph A.
- Architectural style: Mixed (more Than 2 Styles From Different Periods)
- NRHP reference No.: 82001003
- Added to NRHP: November 30, 1982

The Bishop School is a historic school building at 178 Bishop Street in Waterbury, Connecticut. Built in 1886, and enlarged several times, its growth mirrored the city's rapid growth in the late 19th century due to the arrival of many immigrant laborers. It served as a school until 1976, and has since been converted to residential use. It was listed on the National Register of Historic Places in 1982.

== Description and history ==
The former Bishop School building is located in a residential area north of downtown Waterbury, on a parcel bounded on three sides by Bishop, Crown, and Beacon Streets. It is a 2-1/2 story masonry structure, built out of red brick with brownstone trim. It is stylistically a mixture of Italianate and Romanesque elements, reflective in part of its evolutionary growth. Its central section is the oldest portion; it has a broad gable and is nine bays wide, with a pair of brick pilasters flanking a bay of paired windows.

The school was built in 1879 to serve what was then a predominantly Irish immigrant neighborhood. It was enlarged in 1890, by which time the neighborhood had acquired a mix of residents from eastern and southern Europe, and again in 1895. Continued population growth prompted the construction of other schools in the neighborhood, and this one was used in the early 1900s as a teacher training school as part of a progressive plan to raise the quality of the city's elementary school teachers. The school remained in service as an elementary school until 1976. The original portion was designed by Miles Pritchard, a local architect; the 1895 addition was designed by Joseph A. Jackson, a prominent local architect of commercial and institutional buildings.

== See also ==
- National Register of Historic Places in New Haven County, Connecticut
