= List of the oldest buildings in Connecticut =

This article lists the oldest buildings in the state of Connecticut. The dates of construction are based on land tax and probate records, architectural studies, genealogy, radio carbon dating, and dendrochronology. Buildings on the list are limited to the First Period of American architecture (before 1725).

Building	Image	Location	Built	Notes
Henry Whitfield House		Guilford	1639	Oldest surviving stone American Colonial house in New England, museum since 1899.
Buckingham House		Milford	1640	Core dates to 1640 modifications in 1725 and 1753. NRHP.
Feake-Ferris House		Greenwich	1645	Stone basement built 1640, the Greenwich's founding date. Core above dates to 1645 modifications in 1689.
Thomas Lee House		East Lyme	1660	Began as a one-room house, museum since 1897.
Deacon John Moore House		Windsor	1664	Crossing summer beams. Moore was also a woodworker known for using the foliated vine design, which depicts vines and blossoms carved in shallow relief with flat surfaces. NRHP.
Acadian House		Guilford	1670	Saltbox named after the Acadians who lived there following 1755 deportation from Canada. NRHP.
Dr. Philip Turner House		Norwich	1670	The house was occupied by American Revolutionary War surgeon Philip Turner.
Nehemiah Royce House		Wallingford	1672	Saltbox, General George Washington slept here in 1775, once a residence for Choate Rosemary Hall.
Leffingwell Inn		Norwich	1675	Important meeting place during the American Revolutionary War.
Elisha Bushnell House		Old Saybrook	1678	The Colonial property includes two contributing buildings, the second being termed the "Slave House".
Joshua Hempsted House		New London	1678	One of the earliest documented houses in Connecticut, now a museum.
Parker House		Old Saybrook	1679	Early gambrel roof. The house remained in the Parker family until the 1960s. NRHP
John Hollister House		Glastonbury	1680	Has hewn overhang with supporting corbels.
Thomas Wheeler House		Bridgeport	1680	Located in Black Rock, an area with deep colonial maritime history. Core may date to 1644. 22" wide summer beams.
Deacon John Graves House		Madison	1681	Saltbox saved from demolition and fully restored in 1983 by a private foundation, now a museum in Madison.
Ephraim Hawley House		Stratford	1683	Core is a 1 1/2-story Cape Cod cottage modified into a saltbox, hand-riven oak clapboard in situ in lean-to attic.
Ward-Heitman House		West Haven	1684	Historic House Museum. NRHP.
John Randall House		Stonington	1685	Notable for its restoration in the 1930s by early preservationist Norman Isham. NRHP.
Samuel Harris House		Middletown	1686	May be Middletown's oldest building. NRHP.
Loomis Homestead		Windsor	1688	Part of Loomis Chaffee School, main house dates to 1688, with attached ell dating to some point between 1640 and 1688.
Elisha Pitkin House		Guilford	1690	Moved from East Hartford in 1955, interior retains many original 18th-century features. NRHP.
Jonathan Murray House		Madison	1690	Distinctive roof. NRHP.
Meigs-Bishop House		Guilford	1690	English tea room in Madison.
Putnam Cottage		Greenwich	1690	Also known as Knapp Tavern during the American Revolution.
Bradford-Huntington House		Norwich	1691	Gambrel home of American Revolutionary War officer Jabez Huntington. Claimed Huntington hosted George Washington here.
John Whittlesey Jr. House		Old Saybrook	1693	Private residence. NRHP.
Comfort Starr House		Guilford	1695	Original oak clapboard in lean-to attic, residence. Dendrochronology in 2014 confirmed a construction date of 1695.
Thomas Lyon House		Greenwich	1695	Owned by Greenwich Preservation Trust, lacking funds for restoration.
Avery Homestead		Ledyard	1696	Begun as a single-story, one-room house and later expanded to a two-story, two-room house by 1726.
Pond-Weed House		Darien	1696	Constructed in the late 1690s and modified in 1716. Oldest house in Darien.
General David Humphreys House		Ansonia	1698	Home of the first U.S. Ambassador, now a museum. Partially rebuilt in 1733. NRHP.
Hoyt-Barnum House		Stamford	1699	Early Cape Cod Cottage, Stamford Historical Society museum. NRHP.
Stanton-Davis Homestead Museum		Stonington	1700	A working farm for the last 350 years. NRHP.
Eells-Stow House		Milford	1700	Served as a hospital during Revolutionary War, now a museum.
Shelley House		Madison	1700	Dated to before 1700 by J. Frederick Kelly. Chamfered summer and girts with lambs-tongue stops
Pratt House		Essex	1701	Ell dating to 1701, according to museum site. Main block dates to 1732. NRHP.
Howd-Linsley House		North, Branford	1705	Chamfered summer beams and beaded joists. NRHP
Abraham Coult House		Glastonbury	1706	Saved from demolition and moved in 1972. NRHP.
Clark Homestead		Lebanon	1708	Lebanon's oldest building. NRHP.
John Glover House		Newtown	1708	Private residence. NRHP.
Mixer Tavern		Ashford	1710	Historic tavern, distinctive for its well-preserved tavern features, and its long history (into the 20th century) as a traveler's accommodation and local meeting point. NRHP.
Pelatiah Leete House		Guilford	1710	Oldest surviving house belonging to Leete family. NRHP.
Raymond-Bradford Homestead		Montville	1710	Constructed by a woman, Mercy Sands Raymond, in the colonial period. NRHP.
Strong House		Coventry	1710	Historic house museum. NRHP.
John Tyler House		Branford	1710	Private residence, NRHP.
Buttolph-Williams House		Wethersfield	1711	Connecticut Landmark museum.
Solomon Goffe House		Meriden	1711	Historic house museum, oldest building in Meriden. NRHP.
Black Horse Tavern (Old Saybrook, Connecticut)		Old Saybrook	1712	Private residence. NRHP.
Hyland House		Guilford	1713	Saltbox with framed overhang and flat plaster ceilings, now a museum. Dendrochronology in 2014 confirmed a 1713 construction date.
Keeler Tavern		Ridgefield	1713	Fired upon during the Battle of Ridgefield in 1777. NRHP.
Norton House		Branford	1715	House was built in Madison and moved to Branford in 1940. NRHP.
Edward Waldo House		Scotland	1715	Occupied by a single family for over 250 years, now owned by the local historical society.
Pequotsepos Manor		Mystic	1717	House Museum with paired summer beams. Last house restored by architect J. Frederick Kelly
Stanley-Whitman House		Farmington	1720	Saltbox with framed overhang style with carved pendants, now a museum.
Kimberly Mansion		Glastonbury	1720	Home of political activists involved in causes including abolitionism and women's suffrage. NRHP.
James Hazelton House		Haddam	1720	Late First Period house. NRHP.
Samuel Huntington Birthplace		Scotland	1723	Saltbox home of a signer of the Declaration of Independence and Governor of Connecticut, now a museum.
Jared Eliot House		Guilford	1723	A well-preserved example of period residential architecture. NRHP.
Captain David Judson House		Stratford	1723	A fine example of early Georgian Architecture chimney and cellar date to 1638. NRHP.
Harrison House		Branford	1724	Saltbox with overhang serves as the Branford Historical Society museum.
