= Timothy Bradley House =

Historic house in Connecticut, United States

- U.S. National Register of Historic Places
- U.S. Historic district – Contributing property
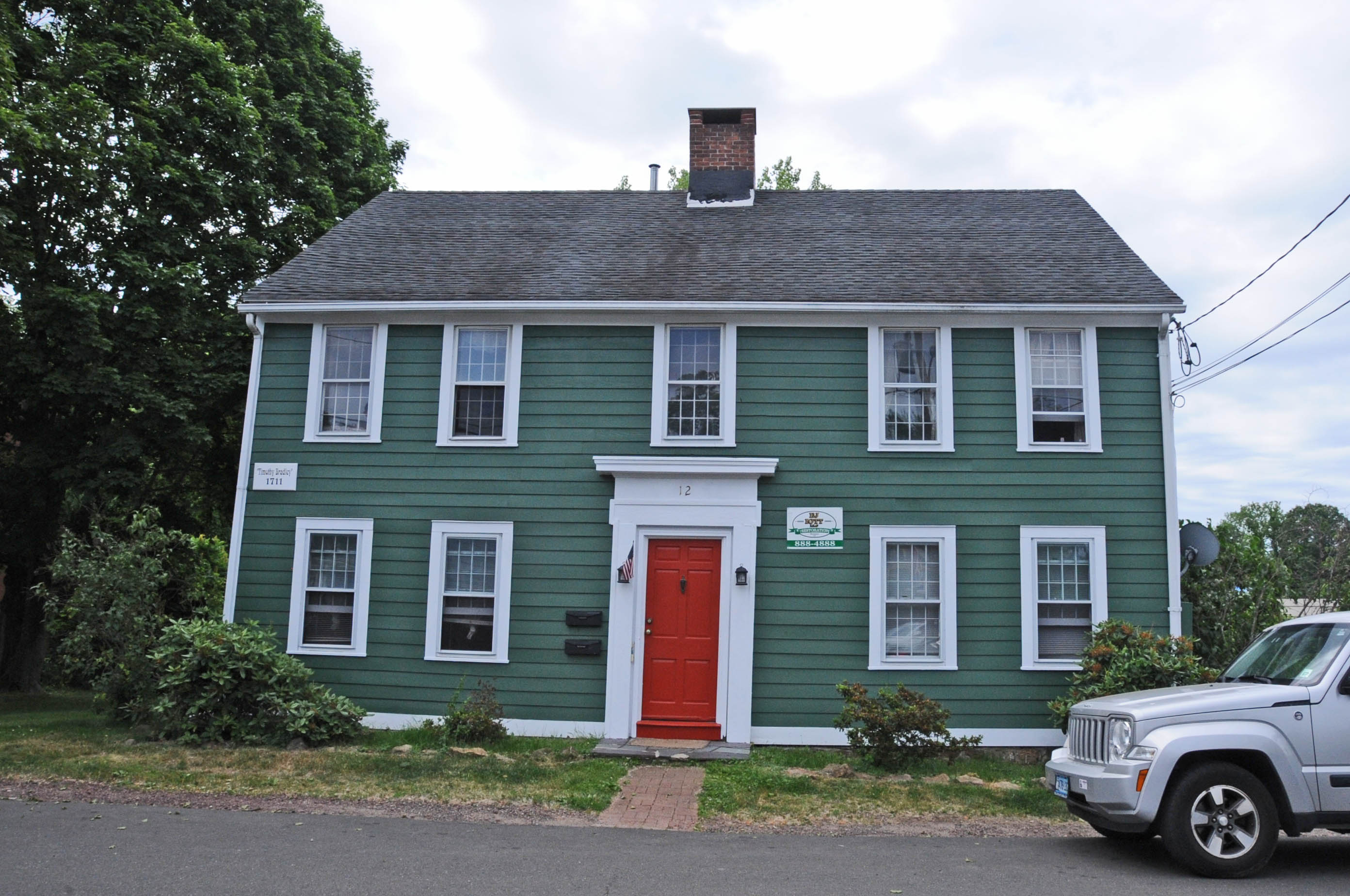

- Location within Connecticut Location within the United States
- Location: 12 Bradley Street, Branford, Connecticut
- Coordinates: 41°16′36″N 72°49′14″W
- Area: 0.3 acres (0.12 ha)
- Built: 1730
- Architectural style: Colonial, New England Colonial
- Part of: Canoe Brook Historic District (ID02000335)
- MPS: Colonial Houses of Branford TR
- NRHP reference No.: 88002630

Significant dates
- Added to NRHP: December 1, 1988
- Designated CP: April 11, 2002

The Timothy Bradley House is a historic house at 12 Bradley Street in Branford, Connecticut. Probably built c. 1730, it is one of Branford's handful of surviving 18th-century houses. It was listed on the National Register of Historic Places in 1988.

== Description and history ==
The Timothy Bradley House is located west of Branford's center, on the north side of Bradley Street, between North Harbor and Main Streets in the Canoe Brook Historic District. It is a 2 1/2-story wood-frame structure, with a gabled roof, central chimney, and clapboarded exterior. Its main facade is five bays wide, with a center entrance topped by a frieze and projecting cornice. Windows are placed symmetrically around the entrance, and are simply trimmed.

The exact construction date of the house is not known. Based on stylistic architectural evidence suggestive of the late Second Period of colonial architecture, architectural historian J. Frederick Kelly assigned it a date of about 1730. This would be consistent with being built not long after the marriage of Rachel Swaine (daughter of the landowner at the time) to Joseph Browne. The property was acquired by Timothy Bradley in 1778, and remained in that family for over a century.

== See also ==
- National Register of Historic Places listings in New Haven County, Connecticut
