= Shelley House (Madison, Connecticut) =

Historic house in Connecticut, United States

- U.S. National Register of Historic Places
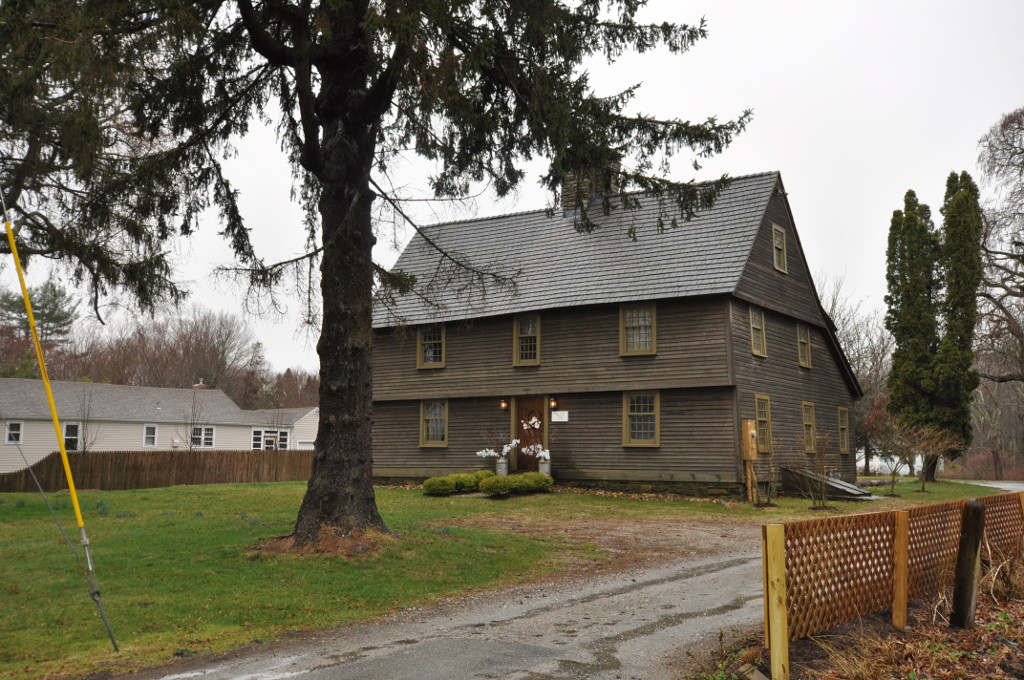

- Location within Connecticut Location within the United States
- Location: 248 Boston Post Road U.S. Route 1 Madison, Connecticut
- Coordinates: 41°16′42″N 72°37′45″W
- Area: less than one acre
- Architectural style: Colonial
- NRHP reference No.: 89000017
- Added to NRHP: February 9, 1989

The Shelley House is a historic house at 248 Boston Post Road (U.S. Route 1) in Madison, Connecticut. Probably built in the late 17th century and enlarged in the 18th century, this house's architecture clearly exhibits a typical growth pattern of colonial-era houses from a one-room stone ender to a saltbox house. The house was listed on the National Register of Historic Places in 1989.

== Description and history ==
The Shelley House stands in what is now a mixed residential-commercial area in western Madison, on the South Side of Boston Post Road U.S. Route 1 East of Stonewall Lane. It is a 2 1/2-story timber-frame structure, covered with a gabled roof and finished with wooden clapboards. A large stone chimney rises at the center of the building. The second story hangs over the first in a common colonial-era configuration. The main facade is three bays wide, with a center entrance framed by symmetrically placed sash windows. The window above the door is slightly longer than the others. The rear roof face slopes down to the top of the first floor, with a small ell extending further to the rear.

The interior follows a typical center-chimney plan, with the entry vestibule also housing a narrow dogleg staircase to the second floor. There are chambers to either side of the chimney, and the rear lean-to houses three rooms: a large central room originally used as a kitchen, and two smaller rooms in the corners. The modern kitchen is housed in the ell.

The exact construction date is not known, and nothing is known about its original owners beyond the name Shelley, and fragmentary evidence suggesting they may have been employed as funerary stone cutters. Connecticut architectural historian J. Frederick Kelly ascribed the date of the oldest portion of the house, the east room, to the late 17th century. Architectural evidence suggests that this room and the main chimney were built first, giving the house a classic stone ender design, which was later expanded in the early 18th century with the addition of the rooms to the left of the chimney, and then by the lean-to in the mid-18th century. This architectural evolution, while quite common, is rarely documented as clearly in the architecture as it is in this house.

== See also ==
- List of the oldest buildings in Connecticut
- National Register of Historic Places listings in New Haven County, Connecticut
