= Eells-Stow House =

Historic house in Connecticut, United States

- U.S. National Register of Historic Places
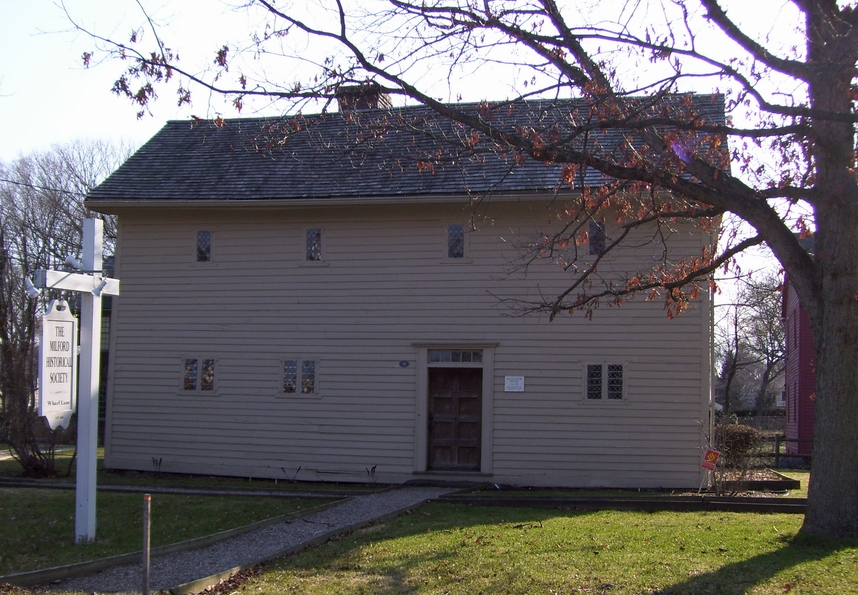
- The Eells-Stow House on the Milford Historical Society property, Milford, Connecticut.

- Location within Connecticut Location within the United States
- Location: 34 High Street, Milford, Connecticut
- Coordinates: 41°13′8″N 73°3′28″W
- Area: 1 acre (0.40 ha)
- Built: c. 1700–1720
- Architectural style: First Period
- NRHP reference No.: 77001407
- Added to NRHP: June 17, 1977

The Eells-Stow House is operated as a historic house museum at 34 High Street in Milford, Connecticut. Built as a private residence and with a construction history dating to c. 1700, it is believed to be Milford's oldest surviving building. It has a complex history of later additions and alterations. It was listed on the National Register of Historic Places in 1977. It is now owned by the Milford Historical Society.

== Description and history ==
In the early 21st century, the Eells-Stow House is one of three houses that make up the campus of the Milford Historical Society. It is located on the south side of High Street east of Green Street and south of the city's downtown. It is a 2 1/2-story wood-frame structure, with a gabled roof and clapboarded exterior. Its front facade is four bays wide, with a large chimney centered on one of the central bays, and the main entrance on the other. A lean-to section, probably added in the late 18th century, extends to the rear, giving the house a saltbox profile. A two-story, 19th-century ell is partially built over the lean-to and another, older addition. The interior includes exposed construction elements, revealing the different stages of construction. The exact sequence of construction of the building's elements was historically a subject of debate among Connecticut's leading architectural historians, including Norman Isham and J. Frederick Kelly.

The oldest portion of the house is believed to date to c. 1700, and was built by Samuel Eells, a prominent local citizen. During the American Revolutionary War, it was owned by Stephen Stowe and Freelove (Baldwin) Stow. Stowe contracted to house and care for prisoners of war who had contracted smallpox; he eventually caught it and died of the disease.

== See also ==
- List of the oldest buildings in Connecticut
- National Register of Historic Places listings in New Haven County, Connecticut
