= Elisha Pitkin House =

Historic house in Connecticut, United States

- U.S. National Register of Historic Places
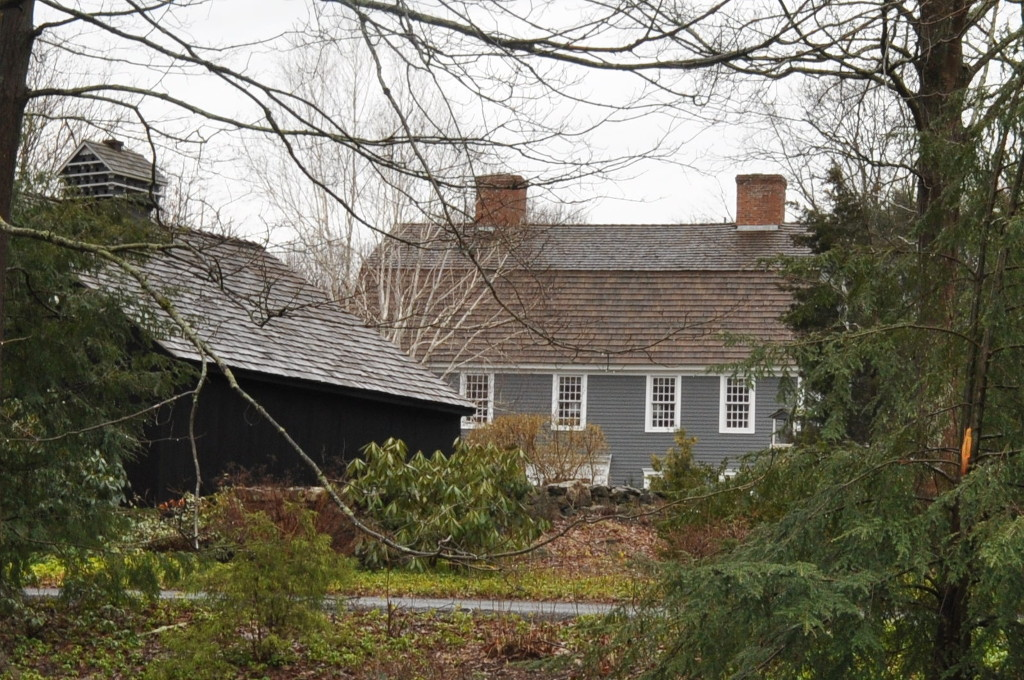

- Location within Connecticut Location within the United States
- Location: 173 High Woods Drive, Guilford, Connecticut
- Coordinates: 41°18′56″N 72°42′07″W
- Area: 5 acres (2.0 ha)
- Built: 1690
- NRHP reference No.: 79002646
- Added to NRHP: April 6, 1979

The Elisha Pitkin House is a historic house in Guilford, Connecticut. With a construction history estimated to date to 1690, it is one of Connecticut's small number of surviving 17th-century buildings. It was moved to this site in 1955 from its original site in East Hartford, and was listed on the National Register of Historic Places in 1979.

== Description and history ==
The Elisha Pitkin House is located at 173 High Woods Drive, in a residential subdivision in northern Guilford. It is a 2 1/2-story wood-frame structure, with a gambrel roof, two interior chimneys, and a clapboarded exterior. A single-story gambrel-roofed ell, of greater antiquity, extends to its rear, and a more modern ell extends to one side. The main facade is five bays wide, with sash windows placed symmetrically around the main entrance. The entrance has a broad surround, with fluted pilasters rising to an entablature and cornice above a four-light transom window. The interior retains many original 18th-century features.

The oldest portion of the house, the rear ell, was estimated by architectural historian J. Frederick Kelly to date to 1690, and was probably built by Joseph Pitkin. The main house was built in 1764 by his son Elisha, at which time roughly half of the old structure was demolished, its chimney was incorporated into the new building, and the remaining portion was used as a kitchen ell. Threatened with demolition in the 1950s, it was moved from its original site on Main Street in East Hartford to this location, at which time some of its deteriorated elements were restored.

As of 2025, it is a private residence and is now on sale.

== See also ==
- National Register of Historic Places listings in New Haven County, Connecticut
- List of the oldest buildings in Connecticut
