= John Tyler House =

John Tyler House may refer to:

- Sherwood Forest Plantation, in Charles City County, Virginia, homestead of U.S. Presidents William Henry Harrison and John Tyler, listed on NRHP as John Tyler House
- John Tyler House (Branford, Connecticut), listed on the NRHP in New Haven County, Connecticut
