= Raymond-Bradford Homestead =

Historic house in Connecticut

- U.S. National Register of Historic Places
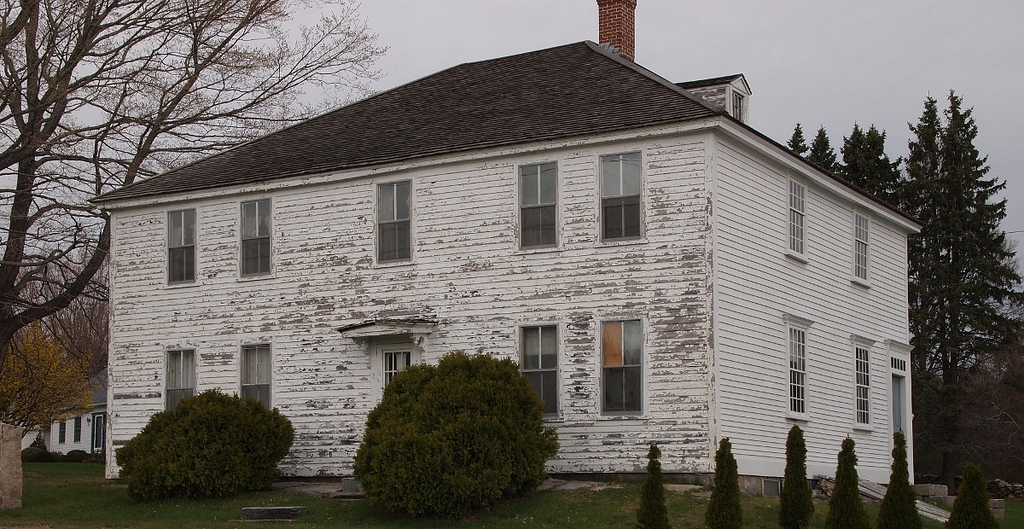

- Location within Connecticut Location within the United States
- Location: Raymond Hill Road, Montville, Connecticut
- Coordinates: 41°29′0″N 72°9′43″W
- Area: 3.7 acres (1.5 ha)
- Built: c. 1710
- Architectural style: Georgian
- NRHP reference No.: 82004372
- Added to NRHP: April 16, 1982

The Raymond-Bradford Homestead is a historic house on Raymond Hill Road in Montville, Connecticut, built about 1710. It is notable for its history of alteration, dating into the late 19th century, its construction by a woman named Mercy Sands Raymond in the colonial period, and its continuous ownership by a single family line. The house was listed on the National Register of Historic Places on April 16, 1982.

== Description and history ==
The Raymond-Bradford Homestead is located in a rural setting of central Montville at 999 Raymond Hill Rd. at the northern terminus of Oakdale Road. Connecticut Route 163 passes to the west and south. It is a 2 1/2-story wood-frame structure, five bays wide, with a hipped roof. It has a center entrance, sheltered by a Victorian hood with decorative brackets, and a chimney placed off-center on the rear roof face. The interior follows a central hall plan, although it had a central chimney when built.

The house was built in stages, with the oldest portion dating to about 1710. It was built on land purchased by Mercy Sands Raymond, a widow from Block Island, and James Merritt. Mercy Raymond managed a 1,500-acre (610 ha) farm with Merritt and her son Joshua until her death in 1741. Raymond is thought to have helped Captain Kidd during her time on Block Island, and he allegedly paid her handsomely.

The house was substantially altered about 1820, adding Federal style features and changing the roof from a gable to a hip roof. It was again restyled in the 1870s, when the central chimney was removed and wood finishes were installed that were more in keeping with Victorian tastes. Around this time, the rear ell was added housing the kitchen. At the time of its National Register listing in 1982, it was still in the hands of Raymond descendants.

== See also ==
- List of the oldest buildings in Connecticut
- National Register of Historic Places listings in New London County, Connecticut
