= Thomas Harrison House (Branford, Connecticut) =

Historic house in Connecticut, United States

- U.S. National Register of Historic Places
- U.S. Historic district – Contributing property
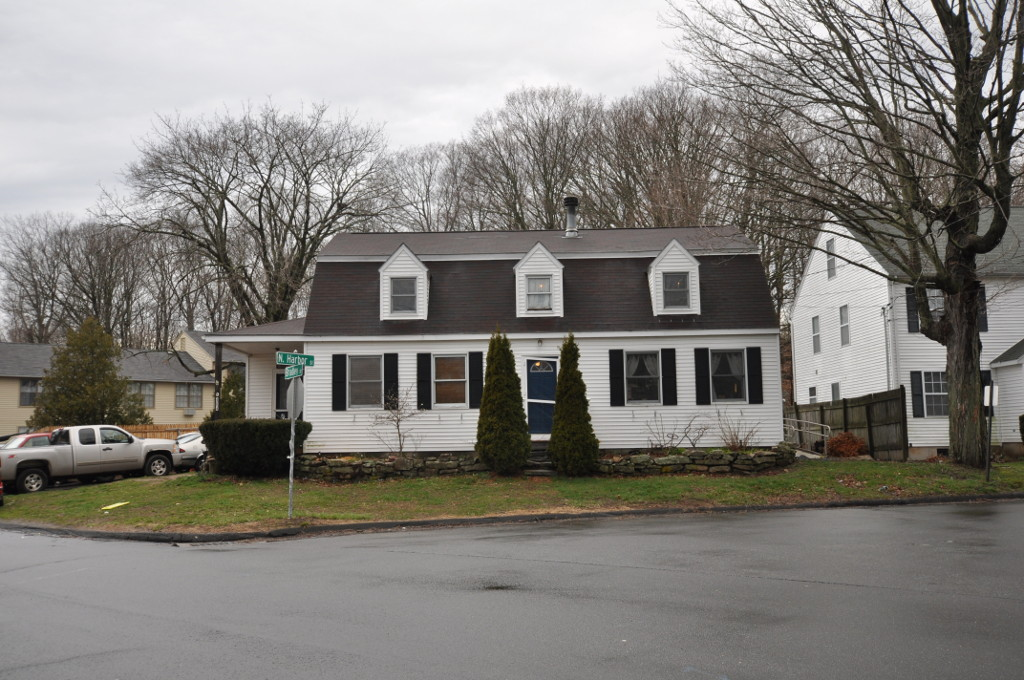

- Location within Connecticut Location within the United States
- Location: 23 North Harbor Street, Branford, Connecticut
- Coordinates: 41°16′34″N 72°49′23″W
- Area: less than one acre
- Built: c. 1725
- Architectural style: Georgian, Vernacular Georgian
- Part of: Canoe Brook Historic District (ID02000335)
- MPS: Colonial Houses of Branford TR
- NRHP reference No.: 88002644

Significant dates
- Added to NRHP: December 01, 1988
- Designated CP: April 11, 2002

The Thomas Harrison House is a historic house at 23 North Harbor Street in Branford, Connecticut. Probably built before 1723, it is one of the town's small number of surviving 18th-century houses, that is further distinctive because of its gambrel roof. The house was listed on the National Register of Historic Places in 1988.

== Description and history ==
The Thomas Harrison House is located west of Branford Center, in the Canoe Brook residential area. It is located at the northwestern corner of Bradley and North Harbor Streets, and is angled to face the junction. It is a 1 1/2-story wood-frame structure, with a gambrel roof and clapboarded exterior. Its main facade is five bays wide, and the front roof face is pierced by three gabled dormers. The house originally had a large central chimney, which (at least above the roof) has been replaced by a modern metal stovepipe. The main facade is symmetrical, with sash windows arranged around the main entrance, which is simply framed. An ell extends to the west of the main block.

The house was probably built sometime before 1723, when a recently built house frame is mentioned in a real estate transaction granting the property to Thomas Harrison from his father's estate. It is one of a small number of 18th-century houses in Branford, and is unusual for the gambrel-roofed center chimney form, where most other period houses in the town are two full stories and have end chimneys. The Harrisons were prominent local landowners.

== See also ==
- Swain-Harrison House, known also as Harrison House and Museum, which is also NRHP-listed in Branford
- National Register of Historic Places listings in New Haven County, Connecticut
