= Hoyt-Barnum House =

Historic house in Connecticut, United States

- U.S. National Register of Historic Places
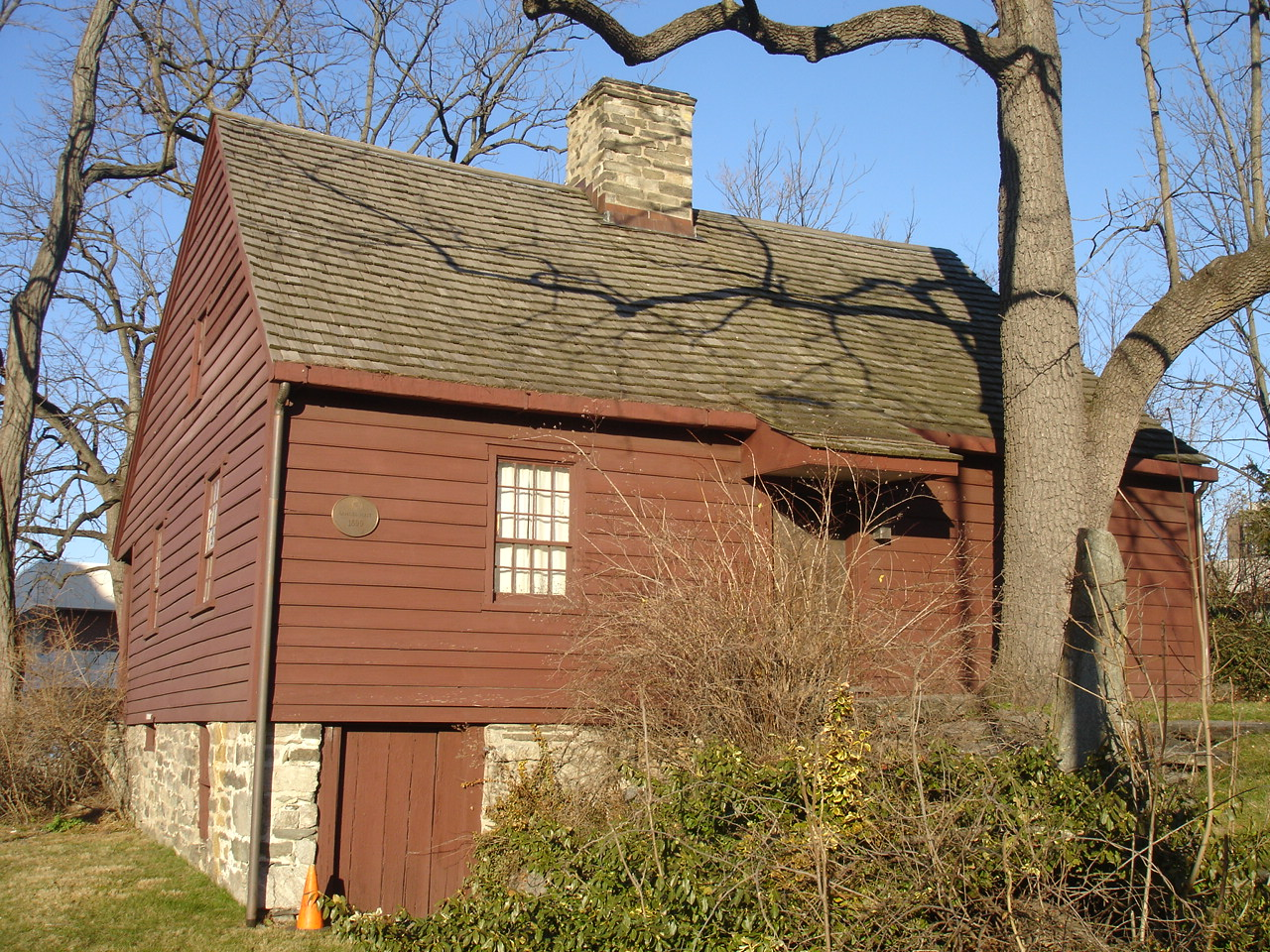
- The Hoyt-Barnum House in Winter, 2012.

- Location within Connecticut Location within the United States
- Location: 1508 High Ridge Road, Stamford, Connecticut
- Coordinates: 41°07′22″N 73°32′43″W
- Built: 1699
- Architectural style: Colonial
- NRHP reference No.: 69000199
- Added to NRHP: June 11, 1969

The Hoyt-Barnum House at 1508 High Ridge Road in Stamford, Connecticut, is a Cape Cod cottage style house that was built around 1699, and is the oldest extant house in the city of Stamford.

== History ==
The Hoyt-Barnum house was built by Samuel Hoyt (1678-1738), a blacksmith in Stamford, Connecticut. He began construction in 1699 in preparation for his marriage to Susanna Slason the following year. The couple had four children. Slason died in March of 1707, likely due to complications from child birth. In December of the same year, Samuel Hoyt remarried a widow named Mary Weed. They had nine children. Upon Samuel Hoyt's death in 1738 the house was passed to his children, while his widow Mary Weed continued to live there. In 1753 the house and its 5-acre tract were sold to a James St. John, it was eventually inherited by his sons upon his death in 1781. The house was auctioned off in 1826 and sold to David Barnum for $1,292. Barnum's wife, Betsey Hoyt Barnum, was a descendant of the house's builder, Samuel Hoyt, and it remained with Betsey Hoyt Barnum's descendants until 1922. The Stamford Historical Society, now known as the Stamford History Center, purchased the Hoyt-Barnum house from a local bank in 1942, opening it to the public in 1950.

== Architecture ==
The large central chimney stack is made of field stone, laid up with only clay, animal hair, and straw. The house is braced timber frame construction or post and beam. As was the case with most homes in New England in this era, mortar was not a suitable construction material owing to a shortage of lime (material). The foundation is of field stone. The west room of the house is plastered. The east room has an exposed whitewashed frame, the hearth room walls are sheathed with wood paneling, showing the various interior finishing techniques incorporated into the house during its evolution.

== Relocation ==
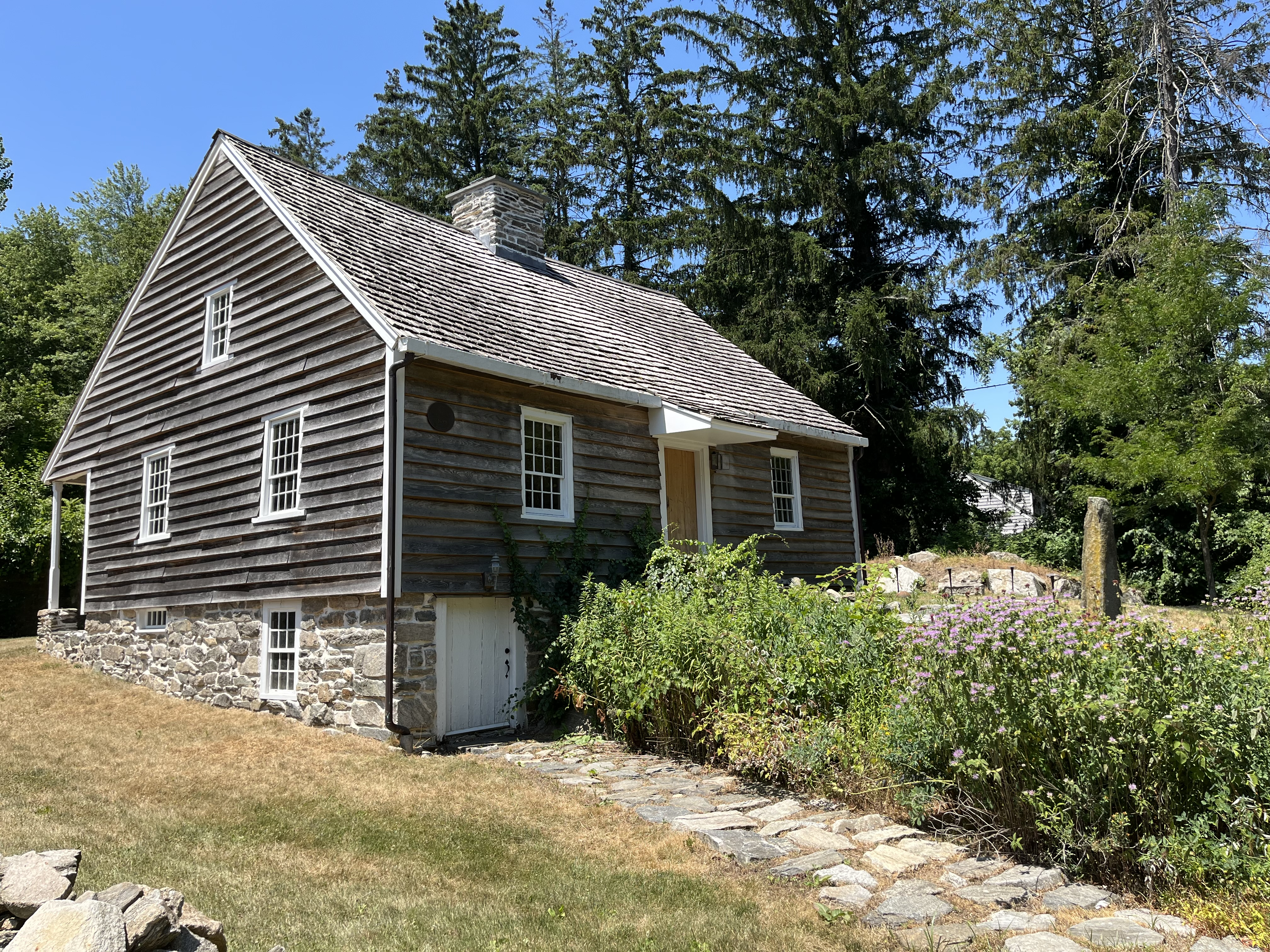
The Hoyt-Barnum House in Summer, 2022.

In November 2016 it was moved from its original location at 713 Bedford Street to its new location next to the Stamford History Center where it is open for tours. The house was divided into sections and moved 5 miles in a procession of trucks to its new location at 1508 High Ridge Road. The relocation was completed at a price of $2 million. Following the move it is the first structure permitted to remain on the National Register of Historic Places after being dismantled, relocated, and restored. Notably, the house's exterior siding has been restored to a historically accurate grey after the removal of the roof revealed the color of the original siding. The house is now owned and maintained as a museum by the Stamford History Center. It was listed on the National Register of Historic Places in 1969.

== See also ==
- List of the oldest buildings in Connecticut
- National Register of Historic Places listings in Stamford, Connecticut
