= Pratt House (Essex, Connecticut) =

Historic house in Connecticut, United States

- U.S. National Register of Historic Places
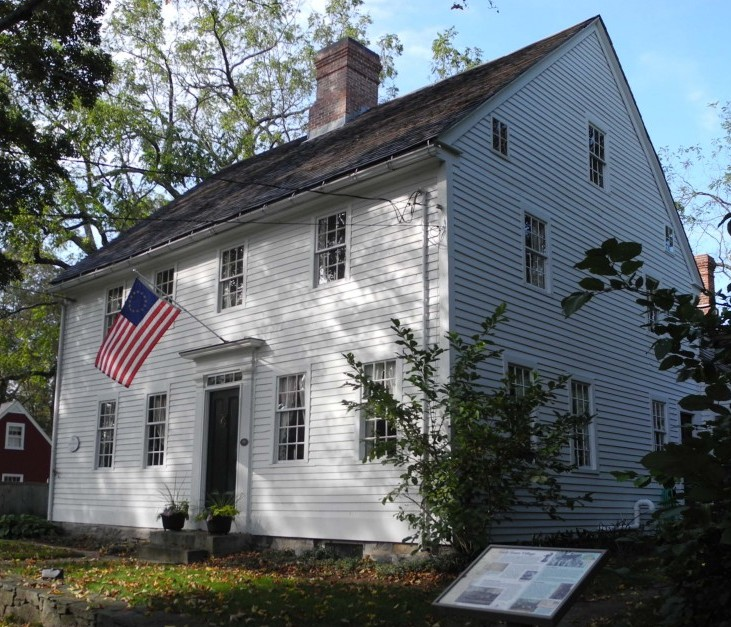

- Location within Connecticut Location within the United States
- Location: 19 West Avenue; Essex, Connecticut
- Coordinates: 41°21′13″N 72°23′40″W
- Area: 2.1 acres (0.85 ha)
- Built: 1701
- NRHP reference No.: 85001824
- Added to NRHP: August 23, 1985

The Pratt House is a historic house museum at 19 West Avenue in Essex, Connecticut. With a construction history of one ell possibly dating to the mid-17th century, it is one of Connecticut's oldest surviving buildings, owned for 2 1/2 centuries by a single family. Now owned by the local historical society, its displays exhibit Pratt family and regional history. The building was listed on the National Register of Historic Places in 1985.

== Description and history ==
The Pratt House stands in the village center of Essex, on the north side of West Avenue a short way east of town hall. It is a 2 1/2-story timber-framed structure, with a gabled roof, central chimney, and clapboarded exterior. The main facade is asymmetrically arranged, with an off-center entrance framed by fluted pilasters and a corniced entablature over a four-light transom window. Two windows are placed on either side of the entrance, and there are another four windows on the second floor. Two ells, of increasingly older age, extend to the rear of the main block. The building's interiors are well-preserved.

The main block of the house was built about 1732. The rear ell is believed to date to the mid-17th century, and was probably moved to this site in 1701, when the middle ell was built. The early builder was William Pratt, one of the first colonial proprietors of Essex. Six generations of his family resided in this house from 1701 to 1915, when it was converted into a tenement house.

In 1952 the house was given to the Society for the Preservation of New England Antiquities, which in 1985 turned it over to the local historical society. The society offers thirty-minute tours from 1-4 every Friday, Saturday, and Sunday during the summer.

== See also ==
- National Register of Historic Places listings in Middlesex County, Connecticut
- List of the oldest buildings in Connecticut
