= Abraham Coult House =

Historic house in Connecticut, United States

- U.S. National Register of Historic Places
- Location within Connecticut Location within the United States
- Location: 1695 Hebron Avenue, Glastonbury, Connecticut
- Coordinates: 41°43′8″N 72°32′39″W
- Area: 20.2 acres (8.2 ha)
- Built: 1706
- Built by: Coult, Abraham
- Architectural style: Colonial
- NRHP reference No.: 00000834
- Added to NRHP: August 11, 2000

The Abraham Coult House is a historic house at 1695 Hebron Avenue in Glastonbury, Connecticut. Built in about 1706 and enlarged several times, it is a well-preserved colonial residence, exhibiting changing construction methods through its alterations. Moved in the 1970s to avoid demolition and restored, it was listed on the National Register of Historic Places in 2000.

== Description and history ==
The Abrahm Coult House is located in a rural-suburban area of central northern Glastonbury, on the north side of Hebron Road (Connecticut Route 94). It is set well back from the road, down a 1,700-foot (520 m) drive on over 5 acres (2.0 ha) of land, overlooking Salmon Brook. It is a 2 1/2-story wood-frame structure, with a side-gable roof, central chimney, clapboarded exterior, and concrete block foundation. Its main facade faces southwest, and is five bays wide, with a center entrance framed by Greek Revival pilasters and topped by a multilight transom window and corniced entablature. The interior follows an early colonial central chimney plan, with a narrow entrance vestibule which also has a winding dogleg staircase. There are parlors on either side of the chimney, and the kitchen extends across most of the rear. Original 18th-century woodwork is retained in most of the chambers, but plasterwork and other surfaces have been replaced as part of a 1970s restoration.

The house was built in about 1706, when the land it originally stood on (closer to Hebron Street) was purchased by Abraham Coult, Sr. The house was held in the Coult family only until 1739, and had a succession of private owners. By the 1960s, it had come into the hands of the local water supply authority, and was vacant and deteriorated. It was sold in 1972 for $500, on condition that it be moved. This was accomplished despite fire damage caused by vandals during preparations for the move. The move, about 1,500 feet (460 m) to the northeast of its original location, including moving the in-house portion of the chimney.

== See also ==
- List of the oldest buildings in Connecticut
- National Register of Historic Places listings in Hartford County, Connecticut
