= Nehemiah Royce House =

Historic house in Connecticut

- U.S. National Register of Historic Places
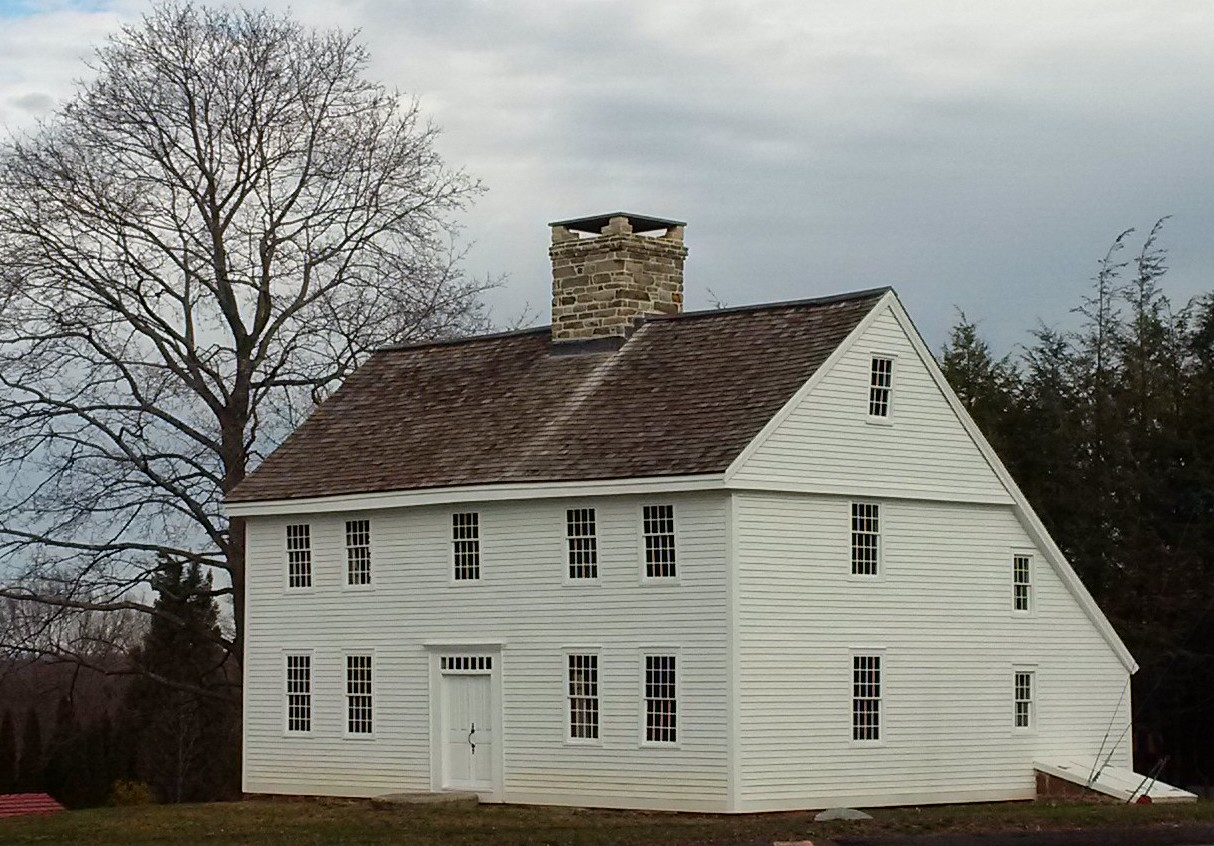
- Nehemiah Royce House

- Location within Connecticut Location within the United States
- Location: 538 North Main Street; Wallingford, Connecticut
- Coordinates: 41°27′59″N 72°48′48″W
- Built: 1672
- Architect: Richard Henry Dana Jr.; J. Frederick Kelly
- Architectural style: Colonial
- NRHP reference No.: 98000966
- Added to NRHP: August 24, 1998

The Nehemiah Royce House, also known as the Washington Elm House, is a historic home located at 538 North Main Street in Wallingford, Connecticut. The saltbox home was constructed in 1672. George Washington visited the house twice, first in 1775 while on his way to take command of the Continental Army in Cambridge, Massachusetts, and again in 1789 when he gave an address to the townspeople in front of the house near the Elm.

== Biography of Nehemiah Royce ==
Nehemiah Royce was christened on May 30, 1637, at St. Michael's church in Stamford, Lincolnshire, England, the son of Robert Royce and Mary Jugkson (or Jackson). He married Hannah Morgan on November 20, 1660, and they had nine children together.

Royce was a carpenter, joiner, and blacksmith by trade, and was one of Wallingford's original 38 proprietors authorized by the Connecticut General Assembly in 1667 to purchase land from the Quinnipiac tribe. On May 12, 1670, Wallingford was incorporated and about 126 people settled in the town. Royce was elected deputy representing Wallingford to the Court of the Connecticut Colony on May 11, 1693. He died on November 1, 1706.

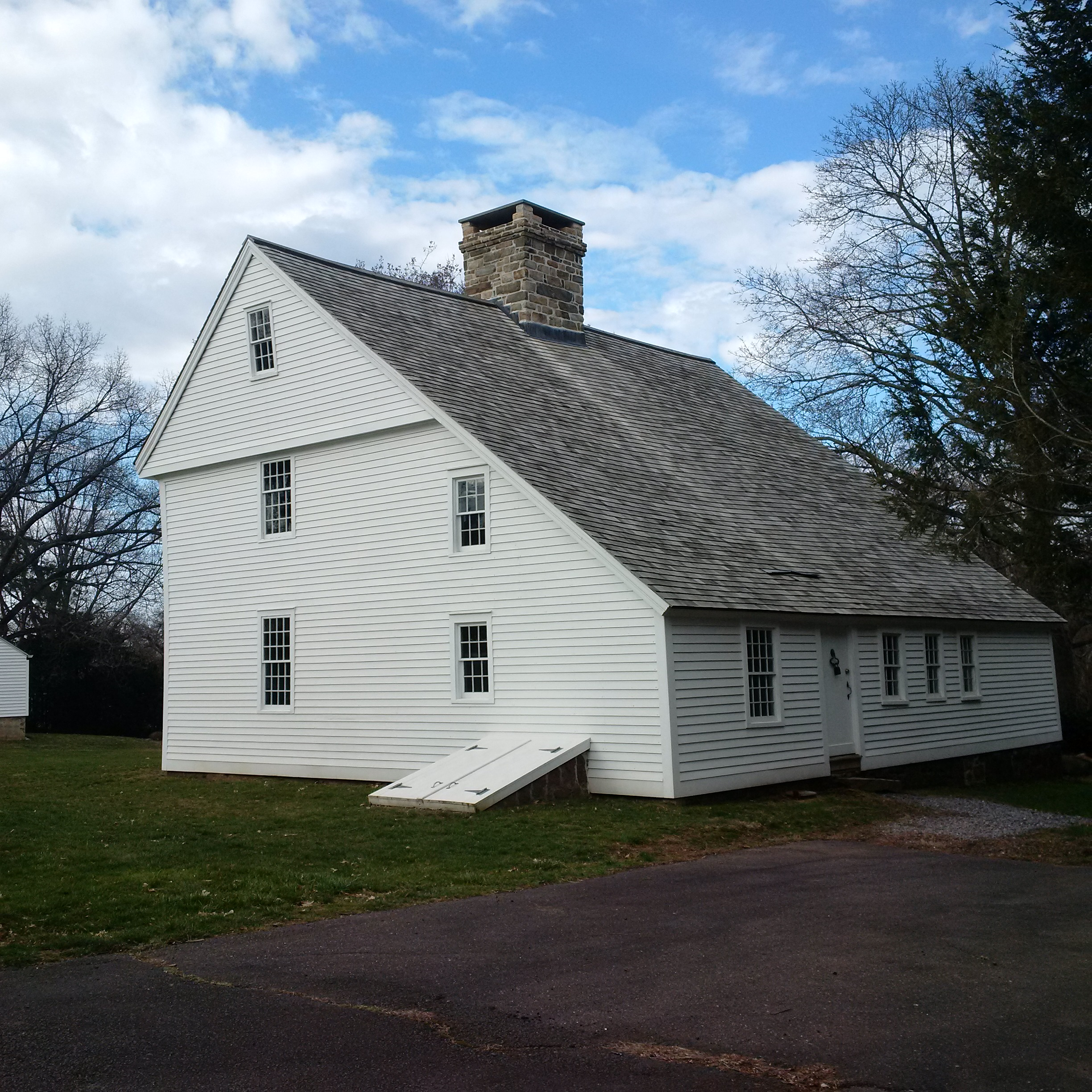
Nehemiah Royce House spring 2016

== House ==
The Royce house is an example of American colonial saltbox architectural style. The Royce family occupied it for over 200 years; it was moved to its current location in 1924.

The prominent figures associated with the 1930s–1940s rehabilitation of the Royce House form an impressive roster of leaders in the historic preservation movement in New England. The list includes Richard Henry Dana, William Sumner Appleton, Elmer Keith, J. Frederick Kelly, George Dudley Seymour, and Bertram Little. It was a museum for a time, and then it was used as a residence by Choate Rosemary Hall, until the school donated the house to the Wallingford Historic Preservation Trust in 1999. It is listed in the National Register of Historic Places.

== See also ==
- List of the oldest buildings in Connecticut
- National Register of Historic Places listings in New Haven County, Connecticut
