= Avery Homestead =

Historic house in Connecticut, United States

- U.S. National Register of Historic Places
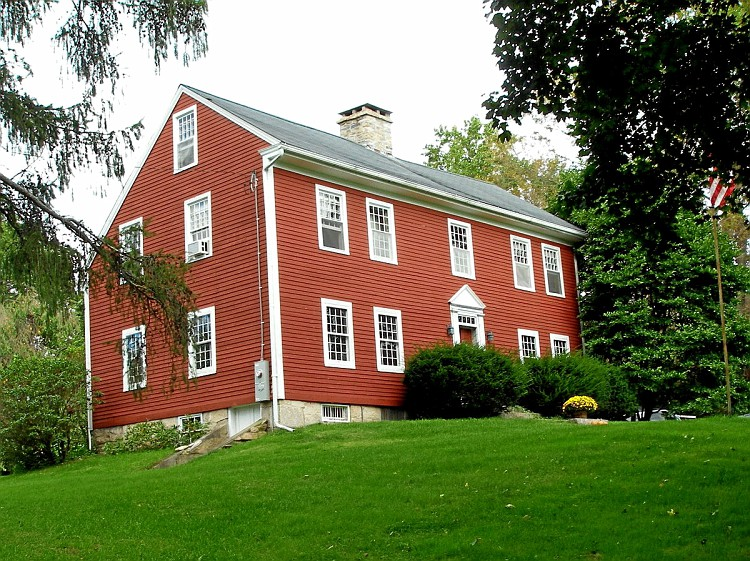

- Location within Connecticut Location within the United States
- Location: 20 Avery Hill Road, Ledyard, Connecticut
- Coordinates: 41°27′07″N 72°02′49″W
- Area: 22 acres (8.9 ha)
- Built: Circa 1696
- Architectural style: Colonial
- NRHP reference No.: 92001614
- Added to NRHP: December 14, 1992

The Avery Homestead is a two-story Colonial home in Ledyard, Connecticut, that was built circa 1696. Evidence suggests that the house may have begun as a single-story, one-room house and later expanded to a two-story, two-room house by 1726. The house underwent major additions and renovations by Theophilus Avery and later his grandson, Theophilus Avery. In the mid-1950s, Amos Avery began a decade-long restoration effort to return the house to its 18th-century appearance. The Avery Homestead is historically significant as a well-preserved example of an 18th-century farmhouse with fine craftsmanship. The home is also historically important because more than twelve generations of the Avery family have resided there over the course of three centuries. The Avery Homestead was listed on the National Register of Historic Places in 1992.

== Overview ==
The Avery Homestead is located on the west side of Ledyard, Connecticut, and faces south on Avery Hill Road. The house overlooks 100 acres (40 hectares) of stone-walled pasture land that extends south to Stoddards Wharf Road. The two-story house has a shed to the immediate east and a two-story barn to the southeast. Past the barn is a farm pond that is located in a small valley formed by Billings-Avery Brook. The brook extends west for a mile (about 1.6 km) before joining the Thames River.

== Design ==
The Avery Homestead is a two-story Colonial house that is believed to have been constructed around 1696. The main block is built in the double cube of the Georgian style. It is unknown if it began as a one-room one-story house with the original structure on the current east-end of the main block. The expansion and alteration of houses in this way was common in Ledyard, and tool markings and different fenestration patterns are supporting evidence for this theory. The strongest evidence is the pitsaw marks found on the chimney girts in the hall and parlor, and the exposed framing and sheathing has markings consistent with a water-powered up-and-down saw. It is certain that the house had achieved its two-story and two-room appearance by 1726 due to its parlor being used as a meeting room for church services. There is further evidence in the construction of the fireplace flues which indicates that the main block of the house was completed before the American Revolution.

Around 1780, the main house was extended by 5 feet (1.5 m) in the rear during a two-story addition that gives it a slight saltbox appearance. These changes were made while under the ownership of Theophilus Avery. Around 1870, the original kitchen ell was removed from the building and became a separate building to the east of the house. The new and present ell served as an open shed until 1965, when it was converted to a shop and office.

The framing of the house is unusual because it has "longitudinal summer beams extending from the end girts to the chimney girts in both the hall and the parlor. Corner and intermediate posts are flared in gunstock pattern. The walls are sheathed with vertical planking except in the attic gables, where the planks are laid horizontally, alternating the taper. Framing is cased in the parlor and exposed in the hall, where the summers are adzed and roughly chamfered." The attic construction is conventional with equally spaced rafters that have mortise and tenon joints at the ridge. This type of construction indicates that the conventional principal rafter or purlin framing may not have been used in Ledyard during that time.

The low granite block foundation of the house is more exposed on the west side of the house, allowing a full-height door exiting from the cellar. The stone stack supports four fireplaces that serve the hall, hall chamber, parlor, and cellar. Also there is a smoke chamber in the stack in the attic. The original kitchen, now in the hall, features a large fireplace with bake oven in the rear wall of the firebox. The attic once housed a large loom that was later moved down to the west side of the cellar. Amos G. Avery owned and restored the house before its 1992 National Register of Historic Places listing, and he removed an 1871 Victorian balustrade on the front staircase.

The main barn is oriented on a north–south axis; it has a conventional bent framing and is sheathed with vertical boards. A cupola with a hip roof may have been a later addition. Photos dating from 1870 confirm its age, but the date of construction for the barn cannot be determined. The former ell of the house was converted to a shed and dates to around 1780.

== Owners ==
More than 12 generations of the Avery family have resided in the Avery Homestead. William Morgan constructed the house about 1696 at the time of his marriage to Margaret Avery. The house passed to Deacon William Morgan Jr. who used it to conduct church services from 1726, when North Groton became a separate parish, until the completion of a meetinghouse. Deacon William Morgan Jr. sold the house to John Wood in 1745.

The Avery family re-acquired the house in 1754. Theophilus Avery owned it from 1757 to 1798; the second Theophilus Avery owned it from 1852 to 1880. Amos G. Avery acquired the house in 1946 from his father.

In 1970, Amos Avery donated 100 acres of land to the Mashantucket Land Trust and kept the surrounding 40 acres. He also restored the house to an 18th-century appearance through a decade-long restoration effort. The restoration began in the mid-1950s, when he poked a hole in the ceiling and felt the molding, spurring his desire to see what was underneath. Avery removed plaster off the fireplaces, replaced the wide floor boards, and replicated the wainscotting. He died in July 1998 at age 96, and the house passed to his oldest son Edward Avery.

== Importance ==
The Avery Homestead is historically significant as a "rare survival of a late-seventeenth and early eighteenth-century farmstead, a significance enhanced by the exceptional integrity of its rural setting. The picturesque interrelationship of the house, farmyard, and outbuildings ... is especially evocative of eighteenth-century lifeways." The homestead is believed to be the oldest building in Ledyard, marked by its fine craftsmanship and state of preservation. The Avery Homestead is also historically important due to its ties to the Avery family, who have owned it for three centuries. The Avery Homestead was added to the National Register of Historic Places in 1992.

== Plaque ==
A historical plaque awarded to Avery indicates that it is the oldest house in Ledyard and states its date from 1720, but evidence suggests it to be older. This plaque was part of a statewide funded campaign by the State of Connecticut for the 350th anniversary of the state's founding. Disagreements over the program were widespread due to the difficulty in dating the homes by craftsmanship and the lack of documentation to prove it. Ledyard recognized the Avery Homestead because of the documentation possessed by Amos G. Avery.

== See also ==
- List of the oldest buildings in Connecticut
- National Register of Historic Places listings in New London County, Connecticut
