= Elisha Bushnell House =

Historic house in Connecticut, United States

- U.S. National Register of Historic Places
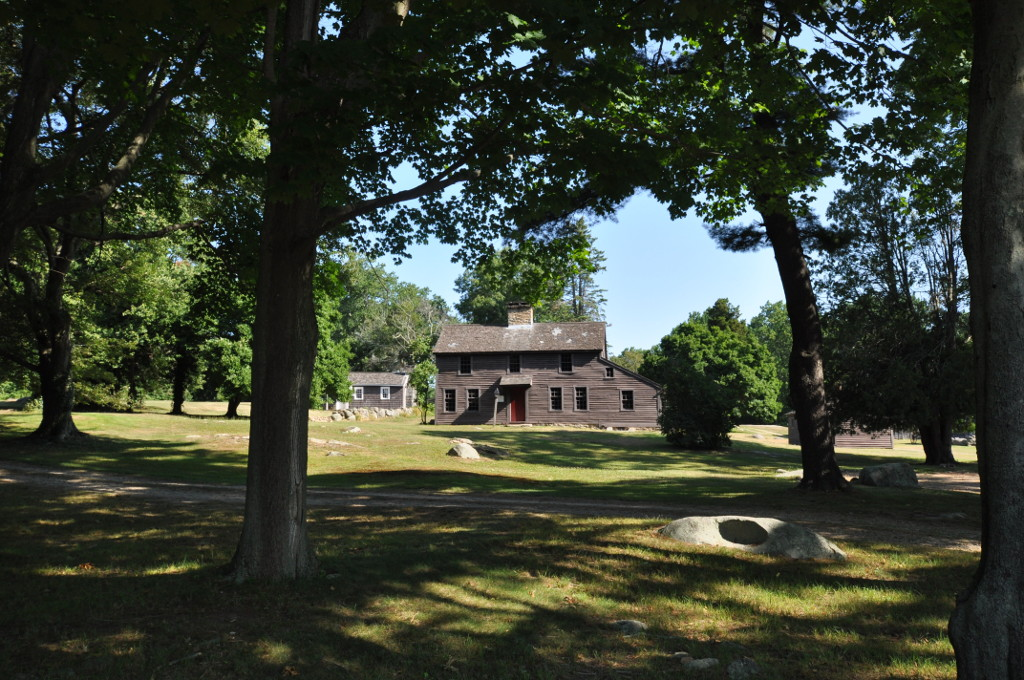

- Location within Connecticut Location within the United States
- Location: 1445 Boston Post Road, Old Saybrook, Connecticut
- Coordinates: 41°17′14″N 72°24′31″W
- Area: 2 acres (0.81 ha)
- Built: 1678
- Architect: Bushnell, Elisha
- Architectural style: Colonial
- NRHP reference No.: 78002850
- Added to NRHP: November 29, 1978

The Elisha Bushnell House is a historic house at 1445 Boston Post Road in Old Saybrook, Connecticut. With a construction history dating to 1678, it is one of Connecticut's oldest surviving buildings, exhibiting an evolutionary construction history. The house was listed on the National Register of Historic Places in 1978.

== Description and history ==
The Elisha Bushnell House is located in western Old Saybrook, on the north side of Boston Post Road (U.S. Route 1) opposite its junction with Baum Avenue. It is a 2 1/2-story timber-framed structure, with a gabled roof, central chimney, and clapboarded exterior. It has a shedroof ell extending to the right, and a rear sloping section that gives the house a classic saltbox profile. The exterior carries no significant stylisting elements, with simple cornerboards framing the openings and building corners, and a shed-roof portico sheltering the main entrance. The interior includes a number of elements important in deciphering the building's construction history, and has some features typically seen only in very old houses, such as basement and attic stairs built into the masonry of the massive central chimney.

The house has been documented by J. Frederick Kelly, an important Connecticut architectural historian, as dating from 1678. When built by Elisha Bushnell in 1678, it consisted of two rooms, one on either side of the chimney, with a loft space above. Later alterations (all before the turn of the 19th century, and probably in the early 18th century), included raising the roof to add a second story, and adding the rear leanto section.

The property includes two outbuildings, a 19th-century barn and another single-story building called the "Slave House".

== See also ==
- National Register of Historic Places listings in Middlesex County, Connecticut
