= River Park Historic District =

Historic district in Connecticut, United States

- U.S. National Register of Historic Places
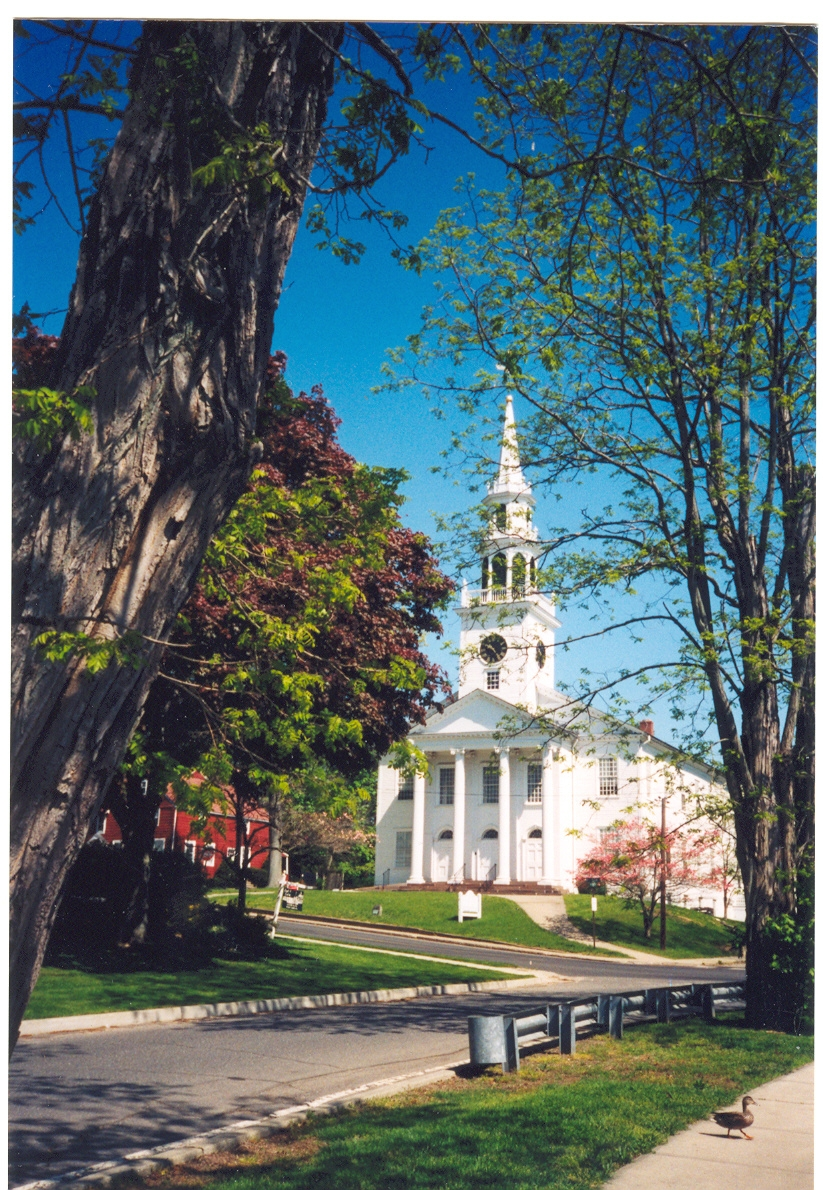
- Congregational Church, Milford, Connecticut

- Location within Connecticut Location within the United States
- Location: Roughly bounded by Boston Post Road U.S. Route 1 Cherry Street, Amtrak right-of-way, and High Street, Milford, Connecticut
- Coordinates: 41°13′38″N 73°3′30″W
- Area: 128 acres (52 ha)
- Built: 1650
- Built by: Peck, Capt. James; Et al.
- Architectural style: Colonial Revival, Greek Revival, 19th & 20th-Century domestic
- NRHP reference No.: 86002648
- Added to NRHP: August 14, 1986

The River Park Historic District encompasses the residential and civic heart of the city of Milford, Connecticut. Stretching along both sides of the Wepawaug River, the area includes part of Milford's earliest colonial settlement, and a series of parks that resulted from an early 20th-century beautification project. The district was listed on the National Register of Historic Places in 1986.

== Description and history ==
Milford was founded in 1640 by colonists who had theological differences with the neighboring New Haven Colony, with the objective of establishing their own colony. One of the original settler's homes, that of Thomas Buckingham built in 1650, still survives in this district. The early settlement took place along the banks of the Wepawaug, and developed slowly, its early economy driven by oyster fishing and shipbuilding. In the 19th century the river was bridged at Broad Street, near the south end of the district, and other industries, most notably carriage manufacture, led to a population boom. During this time, the business heart of the town moved south to Broad Street, and residential construction took place along roads radiating away from the river. As a result, the present district now includes a variety of housing styles from the across the city's history.

In the early 20th century, the city undertook a major beautification project, lining the banks of the Wepawaug River, and creating a series of parks which highlight the river, and building attractive stone bridges at key points. The parks highlight two of the city's major civic buildings: the town hall, a Classical Revival structure built in 1916, and the United Church of Christ Congregational Church, a late Federal-style building dating to 1823.

== See also ==
- National Register of Historic Places listings in New Haven County, Connecticut
