= Stamford History Center =

Coordinates: 41.1224°N 73.5449°W

The Stamford History Center is an independent non-profit organization located in Stamford, Connecticut and a member of the New England Museum Association.

== History ==
The Stamford History Center was founded in 1901 and incorporated in 1909 as the Stamford Historical Society, Inc. The early collections included mainly agrarian objects such as wooden implements, early furniture, ironware, earthenware, pewter and silver. Since the 1950s the society resided at the Hoyt-Barnum House on Bedford Street, the oldest house in Stamford, which is listed on the National Register of Historic Places.

In 1979 the Historical Society was named principal beneficiary of the Cruikshank Collection, 350 pieces of Early American furniture and other objects, as well as $1.2 million at the bequest of Charlotte Dewing Smith Cruikshank, a lifelong resident of Stamford and member of the Historical society. To house the new collection, the society needed to establish larger headquarters. In 1984 the Historical Society moved to the Martha Hoyt School, a vacant 1914 fieldstone schoolhouse, owned by the City of Stamford.

In November 2016, the City of Stamford moved the Hoyt-Barnum House to the Historical Society's North Stamford campus to make way for a new police station on Bedford Street.

In 2017, the board of directors voted to use the name, Stamford History Center, to reflect the physical change of the organization.

== Research Library ==
The Center includes the Marcus Research Library and Archives, which holds books, pamphlets, and periodicals and boxed manuscript materials from the 17th century to the present. In addition, there are 200 bound manuscripts dating from the 18th to 20th centuries; 18th, 19th, & 20th century maps, atlases, and newspapers.

== Location ==
The center is located at 1508 High Ridge Road, Stamford, Connecticut.
