= Howd-Linsley House =

Historic house in Connecticut, United States

- U.S. National Register of Historic Places
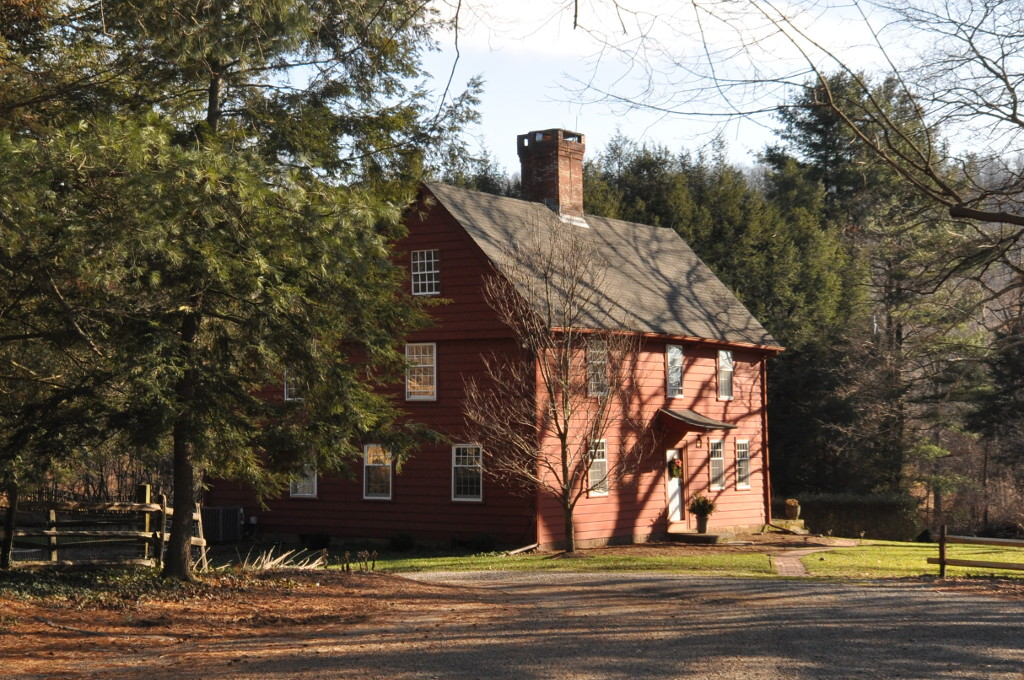

- Location within Connecticut Location within the United States
- Location: 1795 Middletown Avenue, Northford, Connecticut
- Coordinates: 41°24′34″N 72°46′06″W
- Area: 2 acres (0.81 ha)
- Built: 1705
- Architectural style: Colonial
- NRHP reference No.: 86003382
- Added to NRHP: December 10, 1986

The Howd-Linsley House is a historic house at 1795 Middletown Avenue CT 17 in the Northford area of North Branford, Connecticut. Built in 1705, it is a candidate as the oldest surviving building in the town, and a good example of period residential architecture. It was listed on the National Register of Historic Places in 1986.

== Description and history ==
The Howd-Linsley House is located in Northern North Branford, on the South Side of Middletown Avenue (CT 17) at its Junction with Sol's Path, a private lane. It is oriented facing West toward the lane on 2 acres (0.81 ha) of land. It is a 2 1/2-story wood-frame structure, with a gabled roof, central chimney, and clapboarded exterior. The rear roof face extends to the first floor, giving the house a classic New England saltbox profile. The front facade has an irregular arrangement of windows around a center entrance, which is simply framed and sheltered by a projecting hood. The interior retains many original finishes, and exposes some of its main framing elements, allowing a construction sequence to be reconstructed.

A core portion of the house was probably built early in the century, circa 1705, including its massive chimney, with the lean-to added later. The architecture details suggest expansion was completed spanning different eras of the 18th century. The building underwent a restoration in 1928, when a number of 19th-century additions were removed.

== See also ==
- National Register of Historic Places listings in New Haven County, Connecticut
- List of the oldest buildings in Connecticut
