= Buckingham House (Milford, Connecticut) =

Historic house in Connecticut

- U.S. National Register of Historic Places
- U.S. Historic district – Contributing property
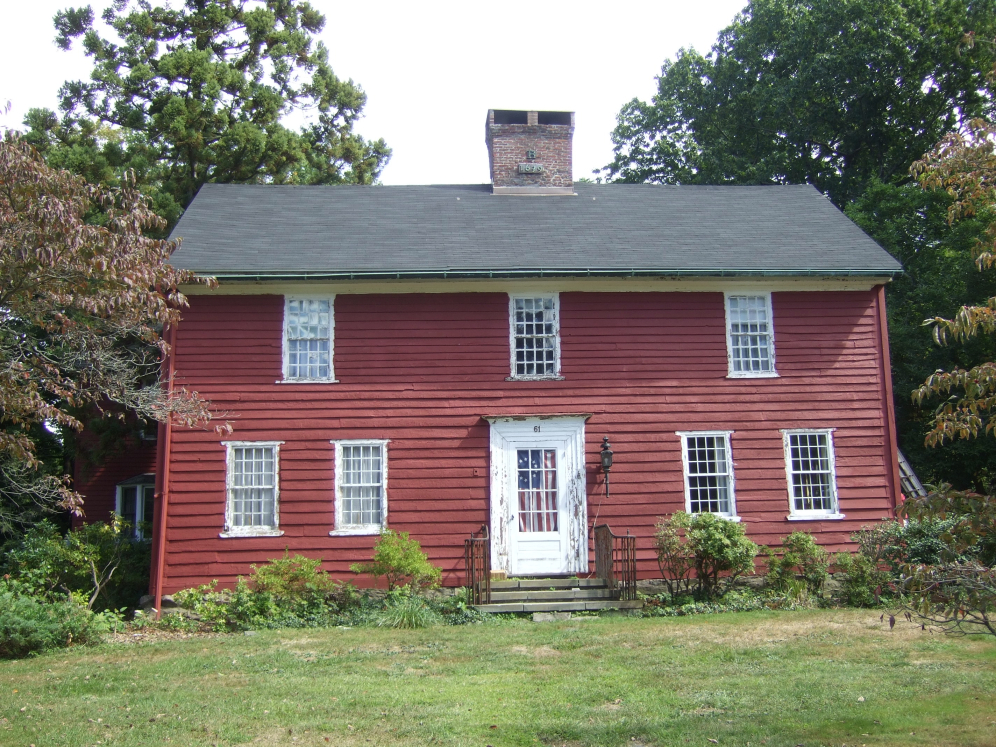

- Location within Connecticut Location within the United States
- Location: 61 North Street, Milford, Connecticut
- Coordinates: 41°13′42″N 73°03′25″W
- Area: 1 acre (0.40 ha)
- Part of: River Park Historic District (ID86002648)
- NRHP reference No.: 77001406
- Added to NRHP: July 25, 1977

The Buckingham House is a historic house at 61 North Street in Milford, Connecticut, built around 1725. It is one of the city's oldest buildings, with a long history of association with early settlers of the area. It was listed on the National Register of Historic Places in 1977 and listed as part of the River Park Historic District in 1986.

== Description and history ==
The Buckingham House is located on land allocated to Thomas Buckingham in 1639 in what is now a residential area north of downtown Milford on the east side of North Street at its junction with Maple Street. It is a 2 1/2-story timber-framed structure, with a gabled roof, central chimney, and clapboarded exterior. The siding on the front of the house is wide sawn boards with beading. The front facade has an unusual configuration, with five bays on the first floor and three on the second, all in a symmetrical arrangement. The entrance is in the center bay, framed by molding and topped by a projecting cornice. Modifications were made after 1753 when carpenter Jehiel Bryan married into the Buckingham family.

== See also ==
- List of the oldest buildings in Connecticut
- National Register of Historic Places listings in New Haven County, Connecticut
