= Norton House (Branford, Connecticut) =

Historic house in Connecticut, United States

- U.S. National Register of Historic Places
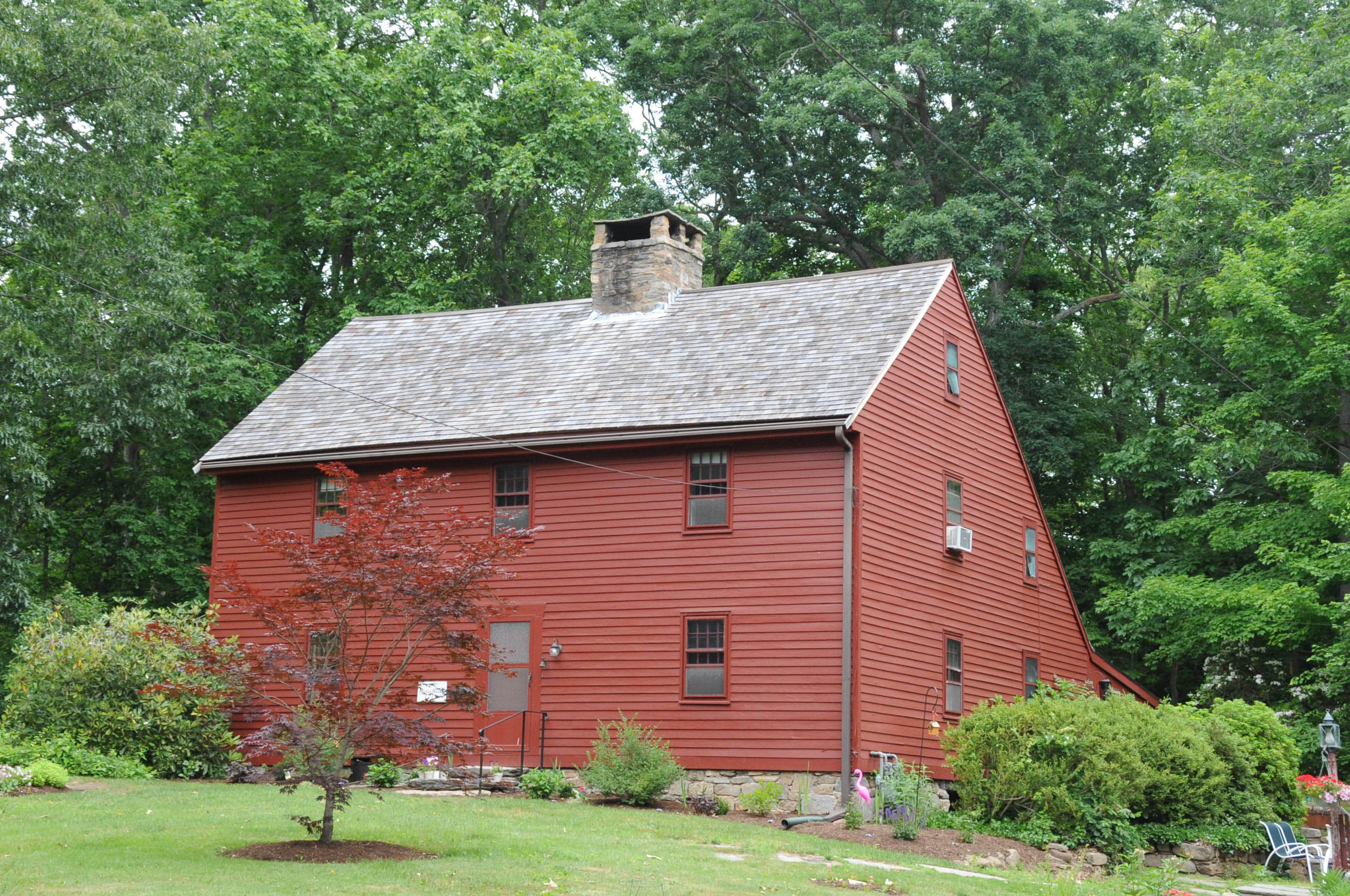

- Location within Connecticut Location within the United States
- Location: 200 Pine Orchard Road, Branford, Connecticut
- Coordinates: 41°16′16″N 72°46′57″W
- Area: 1.5 acres (0.61 ha)
- Built: 1715
- Architectural style: Colonial, New England Colonial
- MPS: Colonial Houses of Branford TR
- NRHP reference No.: 88002645
- Added to NRHP: December 1, 1988

The Norton House is a historic house at 200 Pine Orchard Road in Branford, Connecticut. Built about 1715 in what is now Madison, it is one of Branford's small number of well-preserved 18th-century houses. It was moved to its present location about 1940, and was listed on the National Register of Historic Places in 1988.

== Description and history ==
The Norton House is located in a residential area in southeastern Branford, on the northeast side of Pine Orchard Road south of Birch Road. It is a 2 1/2-story wood-frame structure, with a side-gable roof covered in wooden shingles, central chimney, and clapboarded exterior. The main facade is three bays wide, with sash windows placed symmetrically around the center entrance. The window and door openings, as well as the building corners, are simply trimmed, with the second story windows butted against the eave. The rear roof face extends to the first floor, giving the house a classic New England saltbox profile. A modern single-story ell extends further to the rear.

The house was built about 1715 in what is now Madison, where it was known as the Norton House. It was moved to its present location about 1940, and underwent a restoration thereafter.

== See also ==
- National Register of Historic Places listings in New Haven County, Connecticut
- List of the oldest buildings in Connecticut
