= John Hollister House =

Historic house in Connecticut, United States

- U.S. National Register of Historic Places
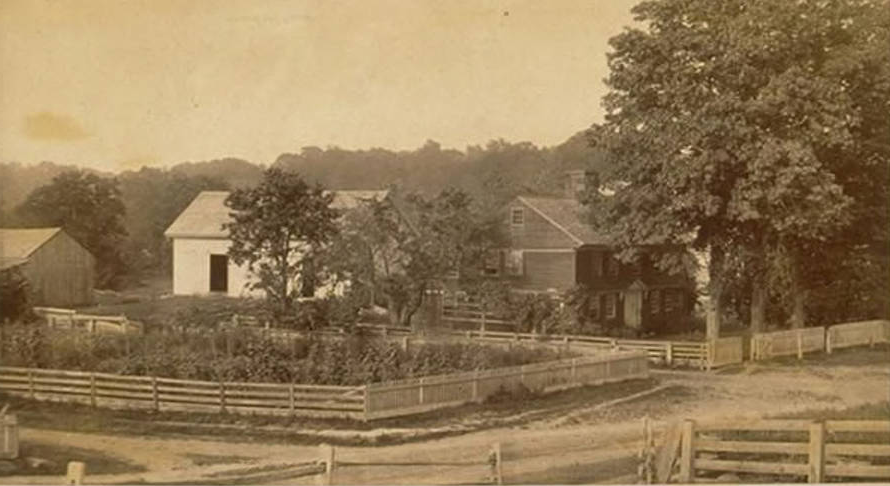
- c. 1890s view of the property

- Location within Connecticut Location within the United States
- Location: 14 Tryon Street, Glastonbury, Connecticut
- Coordinates: 41°40′1″N 72°36′32″W
- Area: 8 acres (3.2 ha)
- Built: 1675
- NRHP reference No.: 72001329
- Added to NRHP: November 7, 1972

The John Hollister House is a historic house at 14 Tryon Street in the South Glastonbury village of Glastonbury, Connecticut. Built about 1675, it is the town's oldest surviving colonial structure, built by one of its early settlers. It was listed on the National Register of Historic Places in 1972.

== Description and history ==
The John Hollister House stands on the west side of the village of South Glastonbury, on the north side of Tryon Street (Connecticut Route 160) just west of Roaring Brook. It is a 2 1/2-story wood-frame structure, with a gabled roof, central chimney, and clapboarded exterior. Its front facade is five bays wide, with a center entrance and a slightly overhanging second floor. The roof has a shallow pitch, and has a deeper than normal eave over a simple box cornice. The window bays are 19th-century enlargements of what were originally smaller openings, and the present siding is laid over what is believed to be original period clapboards. A two-story gabled ell extends to the rear.

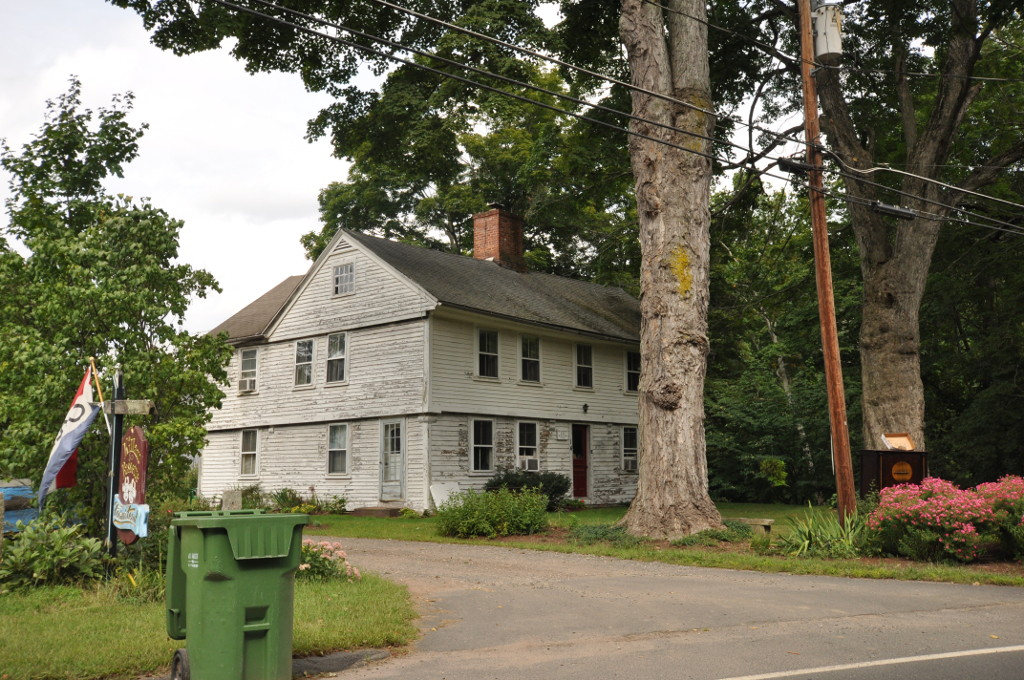
The house in 2018

The house was built about 1675 by John Hollister, Jr., whose father is credited with building Glastonbury's first house (which no longer stands). Local lore says that the currently-standing house was built in the meadows west of its present location, and was moved to its present location about 1720; there is no documentary or architectural evidence to support the idea. The house was originally built as a two-room structure with chimney, and its chimney structure suggests that the lean-to structure on the rear is a later addition. In the 19th century a portion of the leanto was raised a full two stories in height.

== See also ==
- List of the oldest buildings in Connecticut
- National Register of Historic Places listings in Hartford County, Connecticut
