= Solomon Tyler House =

Historic house in Connecticut, United States

- U.S. National Register of Historic Places
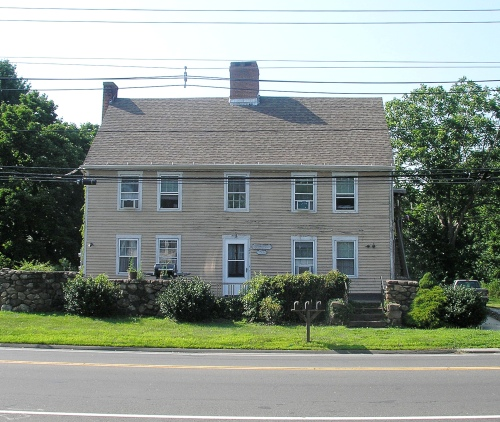

- Location within Connecticut Location within the United States
- Location: 260-268 East Main Street, Branford, Connecticut
- Coordinates: 41°17′30″N 72°47′43″W
- Area: 5.5 acres (2.2 ha)
- Built: 1770
- Architectural style: New England Colonial
- MPS: Colonial Houses of Branford TR
- NRHP reference No.: 88002636
- Added to NRHP: December 1, 1988

The Solomon Tyler House is a historic house at 260-268 East Main Street in Branford, Connecticut. Built about 1770, it is one of the town's few surviving 18th-century residences, and good example of Georgian architecture. The house was listed on the National Register of Historic Places in 1988.

== Description and history ==
The Solomon Tyler House stands in eastern Branford, on East Main Street (United States Route 1) a short way east of Mill Plain Road. It is a 2 1/2-story wood-frame structure, five bays wide, with a side gable roof, a large central chimney, smaller side chimney, and clapboard siding. The main facade has sash windows arranged symmetrically around the center entrance, with all elements simply trimmed. The gable ends have six windows each, indicative of later 18th-century construction, and the roof's gable ends have returns.

The house is estimated to have been built about 1770 by Solomon Tyler. It is one of Branford's small number of 18th-century houses, and a well-preserved example of houses of that period.

== See also ==
- John Tyler House (Branford, Connecticut), which stands nearby
- National Register of Historic Places listings in New Haven County, Connecticut
