= Harrison House Museum =

Historic house museum in Connecticut

- Swain-Harrison House
- U.S. National Register of Historic Places
- U.S. Historic district – Contributing property
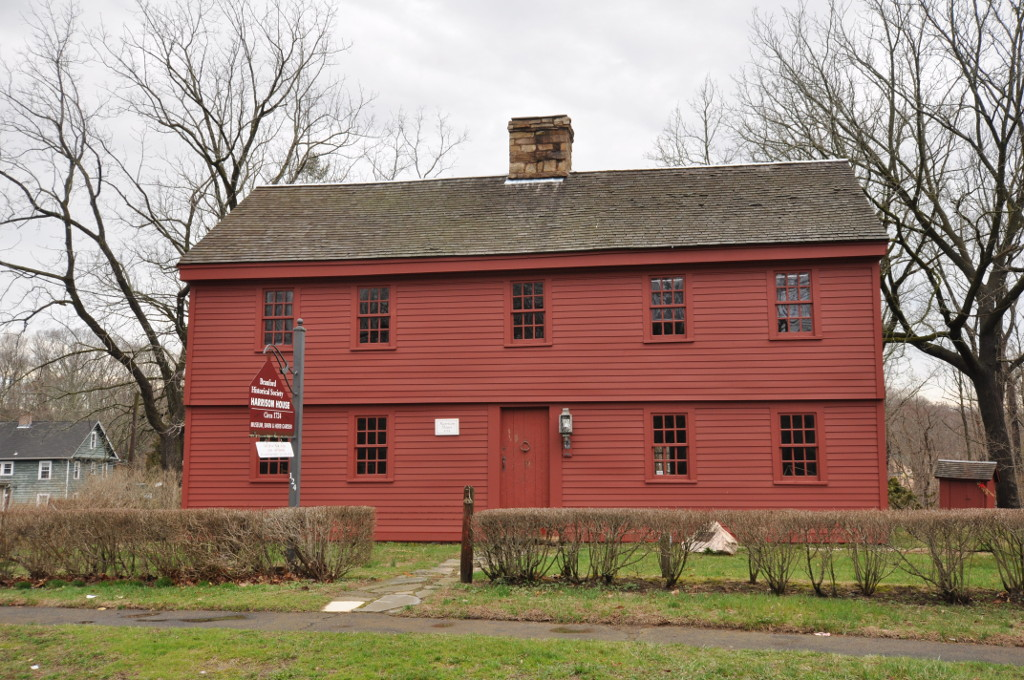
- House in 2018

- Location within Connecticut Location within the United States
- Location: 124 Main Street, Branford, Connecticut
- Coordinates: 41°16′41″N 72°49′34″W
- Area: 1 acre (0.40 ha)
- Built: 1724
- Architectural style: Saltbox
- Part of: Canoe Brook Historic District (ID02000335)
- NRHP reference No.: 75001924

Significant dates
- Added to NRHP: October 10, 1975
- Designated CP: April 11, 2002

The Harrison House, also known as Harrison–Linsley House and incorrectly as the Swain-Harrison House, is a historic house museum at 124 Main Street in Branford, Connecticut. Built in 1724 by a descendant of Branford's founders, it is a good example of a Connecticut saltbox structure. The house was listed on the National Register of Historic Places in 1975, and is a contributing property to the Canoe Brook Historic District. Since 2016 it has been operated as a house museum by the Branford Historical Society.

== Description and history ==
The Harrison House is located a short way west of the center of Branford, on the north side of Main Street (Connecticut Route 146) roughly midway between Cherry Hill Road and United States Route 1. It is a 2 1/2-story timber-frame structure, with a gabled roof, large central chimney, and clapboarded exterior. The main facade is five bays wide, with sash windows arranged symmetrically around the main entrance. The second story projects slightly in front of the ground floor, and a rear single-story extension gives the building its characteristic saltbox appearance. The house interior has been fitted with period furnishings, local historical items and archives, and the property includes a barn and a herb garden.

It was built in 1724 by Nathaniel Harrison II. Its original construction date was estimated to be 1680, based on the acquisition of land and construction of a house by Daniel Swain in that year. Subsequent research has shown that Swain's house stood elsewhere on his land, which was later acquired by Thomas and Nathaniel Harrison I. Nathaniel Harrison I lived in the Swain house, and subdivided the property to provide a lot for his son to build his own house.

The house was sold out of the Harrison family to the Linsleys in 1800. It was acquired in 1938 by architectural historian J. Frederick Kelly, who gave it a complete restoration. He bequeathed the property to the Society for the Preservation of New England Antiquities (SPNEA, now Historic New England). The Society leased the property to the Branford Historical Society in 1974, and sold it to that organization in 2016.

== See also ==
- List of the oldest buildings in Connecticut
- Thomas Harrison House (Branford, Connecticut), which is also NRHP-listed and in Branford
- National Register of Historic Places listings in New Haven County, Connecticut
