= Jonathan Murray House =

Historic house in Connecticut, United States

- U.S. National Register of Historic Places
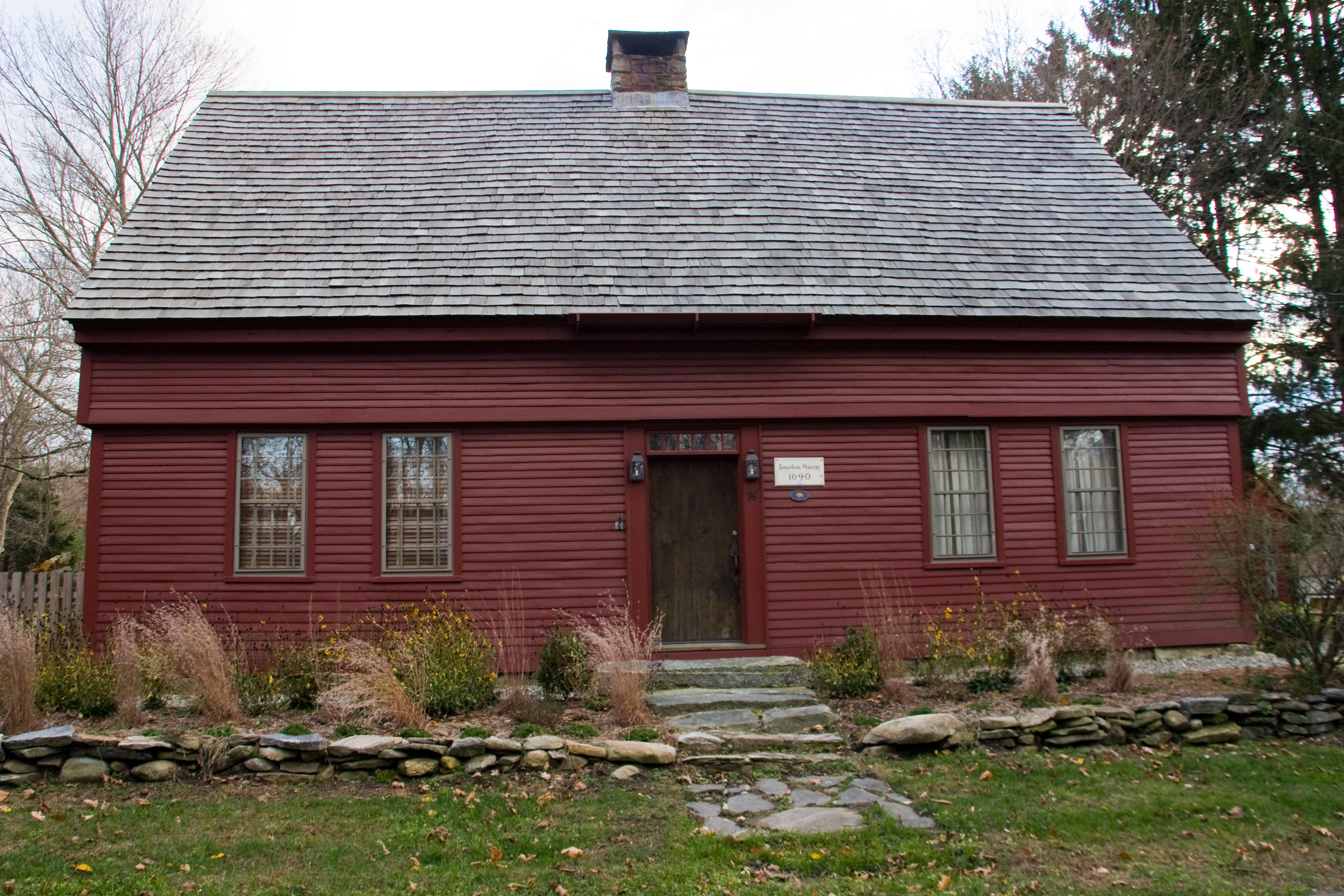

- Location within Connecticut Location within the United States
- Location: 76 Scotland Road, Madison, Connecticut
- Coordinates: 41°17′11″N 72°34′49″W
- Area: 1.5 acres (0.61 ha)
- Built: c. 1690
- Architectural style: First Period
- NRHP reference No.: 82004354
- Added to NRHP: April 12, 1982

The Jonathan Murray House is a historic house at 76 Scotland Road in Madison, Connecticut. Built about 1690, it is one of a handful of 17th-century houses surviving in the state. The house was listed on the National Register of Historic Places in 1982.

== Description and history ==
The Jonathan Murray House is located in a rural-residential setting northeast of Madison Center, on the south side of Scotland Road a short way east of its junction with Bishop Lane. It is a two-story wood-frame structure, with clapboard siding, a stone foundation, and a large central chimney. The roof is distinctive in beginning a short way above the top of the first floor, even though there is a full second story. The facade is five bays wide, with sash windows arranged symmetrically around the center entrance. The windows and entrance transom butt against an overhang marking the start of the second story, which is separated from the eave by several rows of siding. The interior retains many original features, including fireplaces and fireplace surrounds, cabinetry, wide board flooring, and portions of original (or very old) plaster.

It is presumed, based on available documentary evidence and architectural analysis, that this house was built about 1690 by Jonathan Murray, a Scottish settler who arrived in the New Haven Colony in 1685. It is one of the state's small number of 17th-century houses. It remained in the Murray family until 1800, and then the Neeley family until 1923. It was first fitted with electricity and plumbing in 1956.

== See also ==
- List of the oldest buildings in Connecticut
- National Register of Historic Places listings in New Haven County, Connecticut
- The Descendants of Jonathan Murray of East Guilford, Connecticut
