= Dr. Philip Turner House =

Historic house in Connecticut

- U.S. National Register of Historic Places
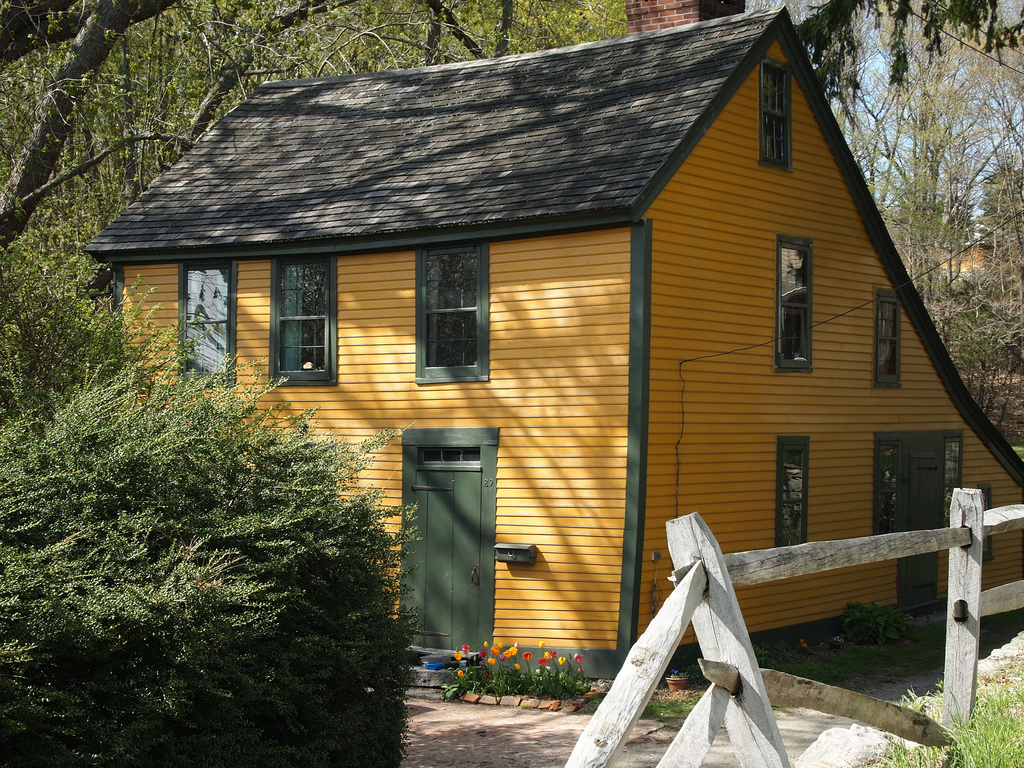

- Location within Connecticut Location within the United States
- Location: 29 West Town Street, Norwich, Connecticut
- Coordinates: 41°32′55″N 72°5′55″W
- Area: 1.5 acres (0.61 ha)
- Architectural style: Colonial, Saltbox
- NRHP reference No.: 70000729
- Added to NRHP: October 15, 1970

The Dr. Philip Turner House is a historic house at 29 West Town Street in Norwich, Connecticut, possibly built in the late 17th century. It is one of the oldest houses in Norwich, and a well-preserved example of vernacular architecture. It was probably owned by Dr. Philip Turner at the time of the American Revolutionary War, who was a leading surgeon for the Continental Army. It was listed on the National Register of Historic Places on October 15, 1970.

== Description and history ==
The Dr. Philip Turner House is located in Norwich's Norwichtown neighborhood, on the north side of West Town Street near its junction with Sturtevant Road. It is a colonial-era "half house", 2 1/2 stories tall and three bays wide, with clapboard siding and a large chimney behind the entrance, which is in the rightmost bay. Some of its exterior siding is fastened with hand-cut nails and exhibits feathering typical of early clapboards. The interior is basically two chambers on the ground floor, with a parlor in front and a kitchen in the rear. There are two bedrooms on the upper floor, with original wide pine floors and period wainscoting.

Turner served with the Continental Army through much of the war, acting as a surgeon at the Siege of Boston before being appointed Surgeon General of the army's Eastern Department in 1777, a post that he held until the war's end. He later became a staff surgeon for the United States Army.

== See also ==
- National Register of Historic Places listings in New London County, Connecticut
- List of the oldest buildings in Connecticut
