= Parker House (Old Saybrook, Connecticut) =

Historic house in Connecticut, United States

- U.S. National Register of Historic Places
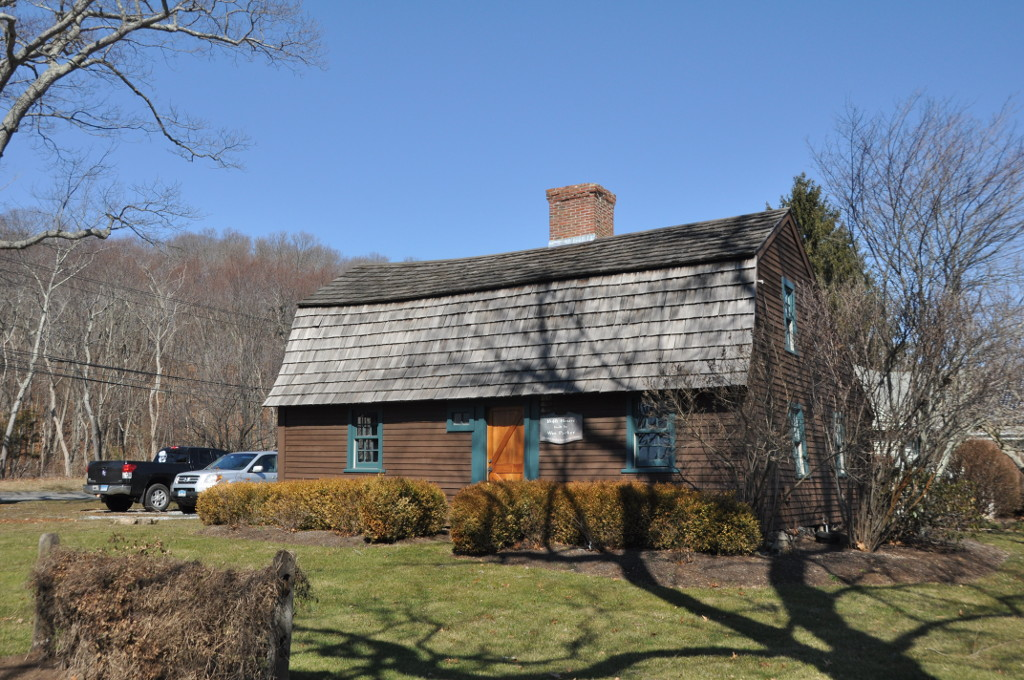

- Location within Connecticut Location within the United States
- Location: 680 Middlesex Turnpike, Old Saybrook, Connecticut
- Coordinates: 41°19′25″N 72°22′30″W
- Area: less than one acre
- Built: 1679
- Architect: Parker, William
- Architectural style: Colonial
- NRHP reference No.: 78002853
- Added to NRHP: November 29, 1978

The Parker House is a historic house at 680 Middlesex Turnpike in Old Saybrook, Connecticut. It is a roughly square 1 1/2-story wood-frame structure with a gambrel roof, built in 1679 by Deacon William Parker. It is believed to be one of the oldest houses in the state, and was listed on the National Register of Historic Places in 1978.

== Description and building history ==
The Parker House is located on the north side of Middlesex Turnpike in western Old Saybrook, roughly midway between the town centers of Old Saybrook and Essex. The road was historically an early north–south turnpike paralleling the west bank of the Connecticut River. The house is oriented with its main facade to the south, facing Essex Road. The house is 1 1/2 stories in height and three bays wide, with a gambreled wooden shingle roof, central brick chimney, and exterior finished in wooden clapboards. The rear of the house has a leanto section which appears to be integral to the original structure. The interior follows a center chimney plan, with a narrow entrance vestibule and attic stair in front of the chimney, parlors to the left and right, and a wide kitchen behind. The kitchen space has been modernized, while the front rooms retain many original features.

The house was built about 1679 by William Parker, one of the first settlers of Hartford, who arrived with Rev. Thomas Hooker in 1636. He soon moved further south to the Saybrook Colony, and probably built this house for his son Joseph. The house remained in the Parker family until the 1960s.

== Family history ==
A different William Parker was not a founder of the First Church of Christ Congregational in Old Saybrook, but became its deacon in 1670. He represented the town at seven sessions of the general court. The town voted to grant him five acres of land for his services. He died in 1725 at the age of 81.

William Parker, II, the son of William Parker and Margery Parker, was born in Hartford, Connecticut, in 1645. He married Lydia Brown on September 7, 1676, and they had two children, William III, born January 15, 1673, and Lydia born February 13, 1690. William "was Sergeant in the Train-band as early as 1672 and in 1678-79 the town voted him five acres of land for services "out of the town" in the Indian wars.... He was a lay member of the Saybrook Synod of 1708 that framed the "Saybrook Platform" for the churches of Connecticut. Both he and his wife Lydia were buried in the old cemetery at Saybrook, and the following inscriptions can easily be read on their tombstone: "Here lyeth the Body of Deacon William Parker, who dec(d) Aug. 20, 1725, aged 81 years."

== See also ==
- List of the oldest buildings in Connecticut
- National Register of Historic Places listings in Middlesex County, Connecticut
