= Clark Homestead =

Historic house in Connecticut

- U.S. National Register of Historic Places
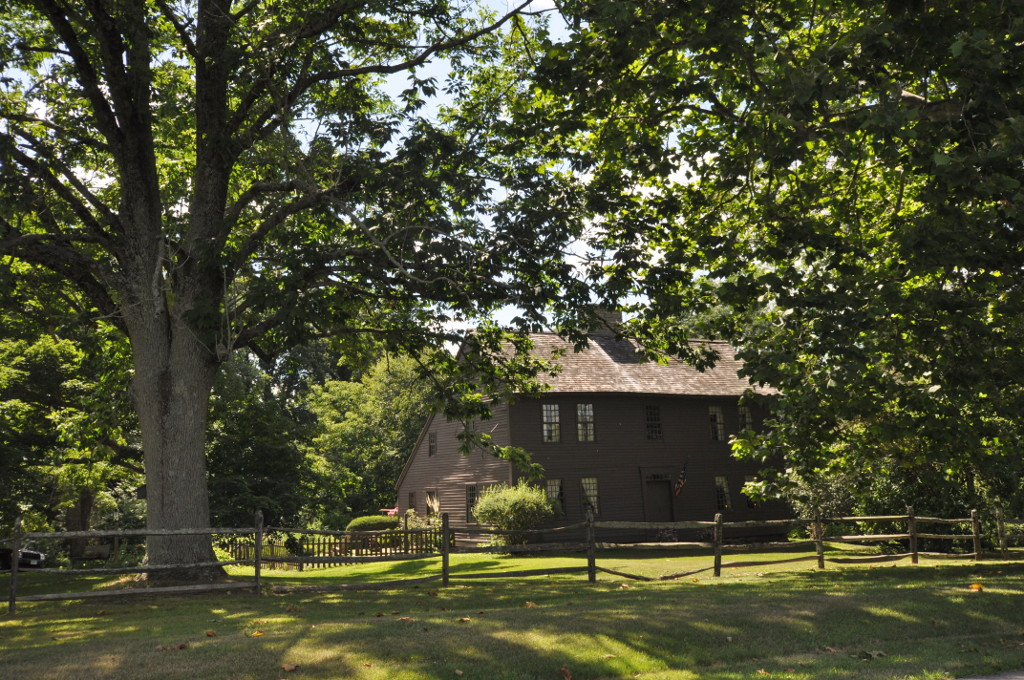

- Location within Connecticut Location within the United States
- Location: South of Lebanon on Madley Road, Lebanon, Connecticut
- Coordinates: 41°37′34″N 72°12′54″W
- Area: 5 acres (2.0 ha)
- Built: 1708
- Architect: Clark, Moses
- Architectural style: Colonial
- NRHP reference No.: 78002875
- Added to NRHP: December 1, 1978

The Clark Homestead is a historic house on Madley Road in Lebanon, Connecticut, built around 1708. It is believed to be Lebanon's oldest building. It was owned in the late 18th century by James Clark, a veteran of the American Revolutionary War. The house was listed on the National Register of Historic Places on December 1, 1978.

== Description and history ==
The Clark Homestead is located about 1 mile (1.6 km) south of the village center of Lebanon, on five rural acres at the junction of Madley and Goshen Hill Roads. It is a 2 1/2-story wood-frame structure, five bays wide, with a side-gable roof, large central chimney, clapboarded exterior, and rear lean-to section giving it a classic New England saltbox appearance. An ell was added in the 19th century which extends to the rear. The entrance is at the center of the front facade, with a seven-light transom window and architrave above. The interior follows a typical central chimney plan, with a narrow winding staircase in the entry vestibule and parlor spaces to either side. The north bedroom in particular has a fine fireplace surround with fluted pilasters.

The land is a remnant of 100 acres (40 ha) purchased in 1700 by Daniel Clark. His grandson Moses was given the land in 1708, and he built the oldest portion of this house soon afterward. That portion included the central chimney and three bays; it was widened and extended about 1750, probably by Moses's son James, making it five bays wide and adding the lean-to. James Clark was a veteran of the American Revolutionary War, serving at the Battle of Bunker Hill, the Battle of White Plains, and other engagements. He lived to age 95 and attended the dedication of the Bunker Hill Monument.

== See also ==
- List of the oldest buildings in Connecticut
- National Register of Historic Places listings in New London County, Connecticut
