= Ward-Heitman House =

Historic house in Connecticut, United States

- U.S. National Register of Historic Places
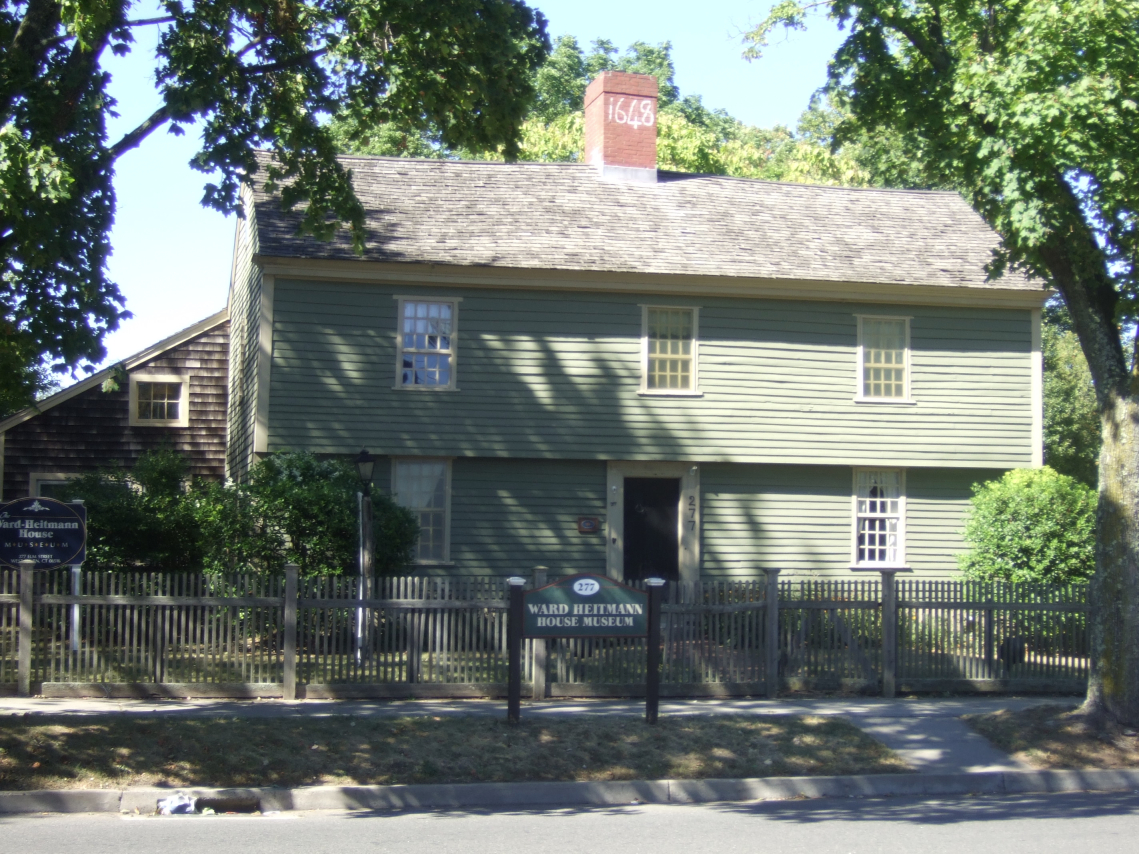

- Location within Connecticut Location within the United States
- Location: 277 Elm Street, West Haven, Connecticut
- Coordinates: 41°16′34″N 72°57′08″W
- Area: 0.5 acres (0.20 ha)
- Built: 1684
- Built by: Ebenezer Clark
- Architectural style: Colonial
- NRHP reference No.: 02001691
- Added to NRHP: January 8, 2003

The Ward-Heitman House is a historic house museum at 277 Elm Street in West Haven, Connecticut. The house displays furnishings and objects that might have been used by families that lived here in more than 250 years of residential occupancy. The house was listed on the National Register of Historic Places in 2003.

== Description and history ==
The Ward-Heitman House is located north of the center of West Haven, occupying 0.5 acres (0.20 ha) on the north side of Elm Street between Campbell Avenue and Ward Place. It is a 2 1/2-story timber-frame structure, with a heavy post-and-beam frame finished in wooden clapboards and covered by a gabled roof. It has a three-bay front facade, with sash windows arranged symmetrically around the main entrance. The second story has a slight overhang, and there is a large brick chimney at the center of the building. One ell extends to the rear, and a second extends to the west side. A 20th-century addition which extended to the east has been removed. The interior of the main block was originally two rooms on each floor, separated by the chimney.

The house's exact construction date is not known but could date to as early as 1684. It was certainly on the site by 1725. It was most likely built by Ebenezer Clark, who owned the land in this area at that time through his marriage to Rebecca Brown, daughter of Ebenezer Brown, the first colonial grantee. The property was acquired by Thomas Ward in 1788, and his descendants (including the Heitmans) remained on the property until 1909. It went through a number of owners in the 20th century, before being given to the National Trust for Historic Preservation in 1995. The trust deeded the property to a local nonprofit, which now operates it as a historic house museum.

== See also ==
- National Register of Historic Places listings in New Haven County, Connecticut
- List of the oldest buildings in Connecticut
