= Meigs-Bishop House =

Historic house in Connecticut, United States

- Meigs–Bishop House
- U.S. National Register of Historic Places
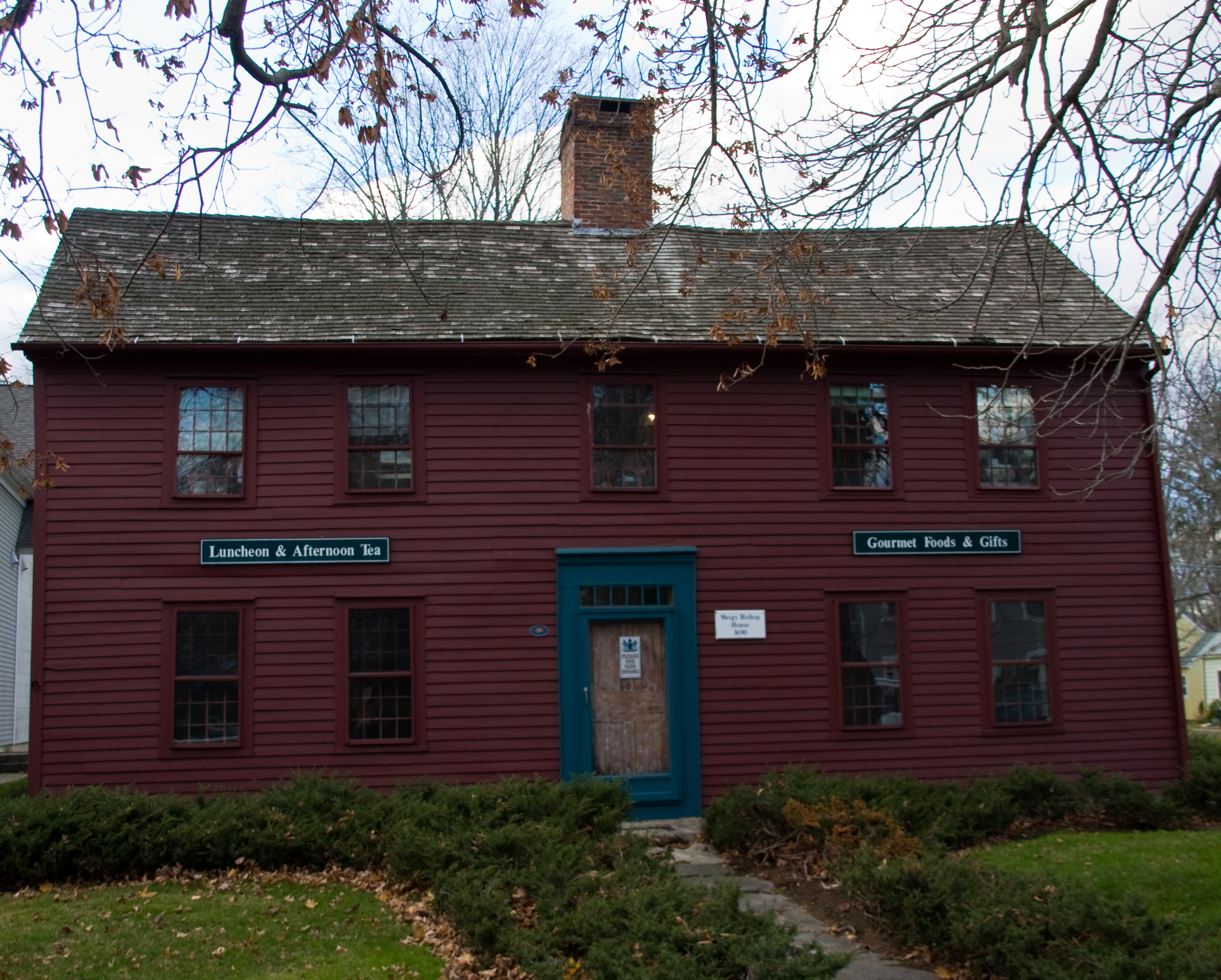

- Location within Connecticut Location within the United States
- Location: 45 Wall Street, Madison, Connecticut
- Coordinates: 41°16′52″N 72°35′40″W
- Area: less than one acre
- Built: 1690
- Architectural style: One-room plan
- NRHP reference No.: 88000745
- Added to NRHP: June 16, 1988

The Meigs–Bishop House is a historic house at 45 Wall Street in Madison, Connecticut. With a construction history dating to about 1690, it is one of the town's oldest surviving buildings. It was listed on the National Register of Historic Places in 1988. It is now used for commercial purposes.

== Description and history ==
The Meigs-Bishop House is located in Madison's central business district, on the west side of Wall Street at Brookside Road. It is a 2 1/2-story wood-frame structure, with a gabled roof, large central chimney, and clapboard exterior. Its main facade is five bays wide, with a slightly asymmetrical placement of sash windows around a nearly centered entrance. The entrance is simply framed, with a six-light transom window topped by crown moulding. Original interior features include wide floorboards, exposed posts and beams in the front rooms; the fireplace surrounds in these rooms are later alterations.

The house was built in stages, the oldest portion being a single three-bay pile dating to c. 1690. A second pile was added in the early 18th century, with the addition of the rear leanto c. 1725 to give the house a saltbox appearance. There were further additions in the late 19th century. It is believed to be Madison's second oldest house. Its initial construction was by Janna Meigs, who represented what was then Guilford in the colonial assembly. It was later owned by Phineas Meigs, who served in the American Revolutionary War, and was killed defending the area from a British raid.

In the 20th century, it was adapted for commercial use.

== See also ==
- List of the oldest buildings in Connecticut
- National Register of Historic Places listings in New Haven County, Connecticut
