= Canoe Brook Historic District =

Historic district in Connecticut, United States

- U.S. National Register of Historic Places
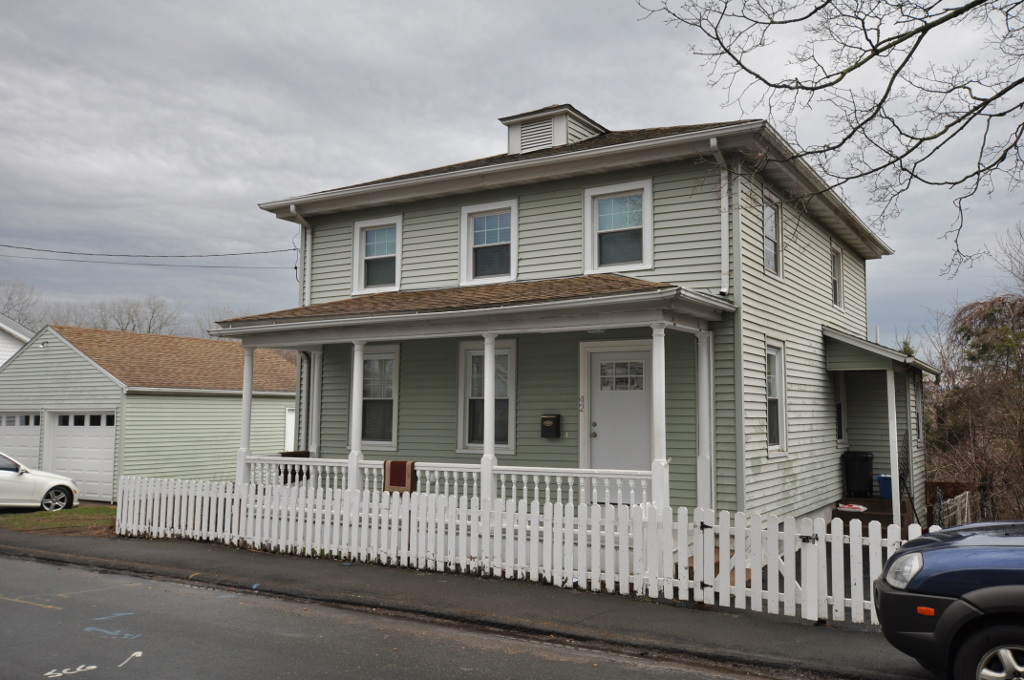

- Location within Connecticut Location within the United States
- Location: Roughly along Bradley Street, Cherry Hill Road, Home Place, Lincoln Avenue, Main and North Harbor Streets, Branford, Connecticut
- Coordinates: 41°16′37″N 72°49′21″W
- Area: 52 acres (21 ha)
- Architectural style: Colonial, Federal, et al.
- NRHP reference No.: 02000335
- Added to NRHP: April 11, 2002

The Canoe Brook Historic District encompasses a small but ethnically diverse residential area West of the center of Branford, Connecticut, which exhibits more than 200 years of architectural history. It extends from Cherry Hill Road in the North to Bradley Street in the south, including portions of Main Street, Home Place, and North Harbor Street. It was listed on the National Register of Historic Places in 2002. The district takes its name from Canoe Brook, a waterway now largely built over by North Main Street and other construction.

== Description and history ==
The Canoe Brook area was first settled in the 1680s by Daniel Swaine, an English-born colonial settler. His land passed to Nathaniel Harrison, who occupied the Swaine House (which no longer stands). Houses built in the 1720s for his sons, the Harrison House Museum and the Thomas Harrison House, are the district's oldest surviving buildings. The area became a small agrarian community, anchored by members of the Swaine and Harrison families, but also growing to include mariners who built houses along Main Street or what is now called Home Place. The area became more residential with the advent of the Industrial Revolution and the construction of the railroad which forms the district's southern boundary. Successive waves of immigrants and infill construction up to World War II gave the district its present density.

The historic district is roughly in the shape of a Z, whose principal elements are Bradley Street, Main Street, and North Main Street (although no properties on the latter are included). The district is about 52 acres (21 ha) in size, with 51 historic residences. There are a few commercial and civic structures in the district, including two schools and a fire station, as well as a modest number of non-historic buildings. Most of the residences are wood-frame structures, and are in a diversity of styles, from the early colonial Harrison houses to early 20th century Tudor Revival houses on Cherry Hill Road.

== See also ==
- National Register of Historic Places listings in New Haven County, Connecticut
