= John Tyler House (Branford, Connecticut) =

Historic house in Connecticut, United States

- U.S. National Register of Historic Places
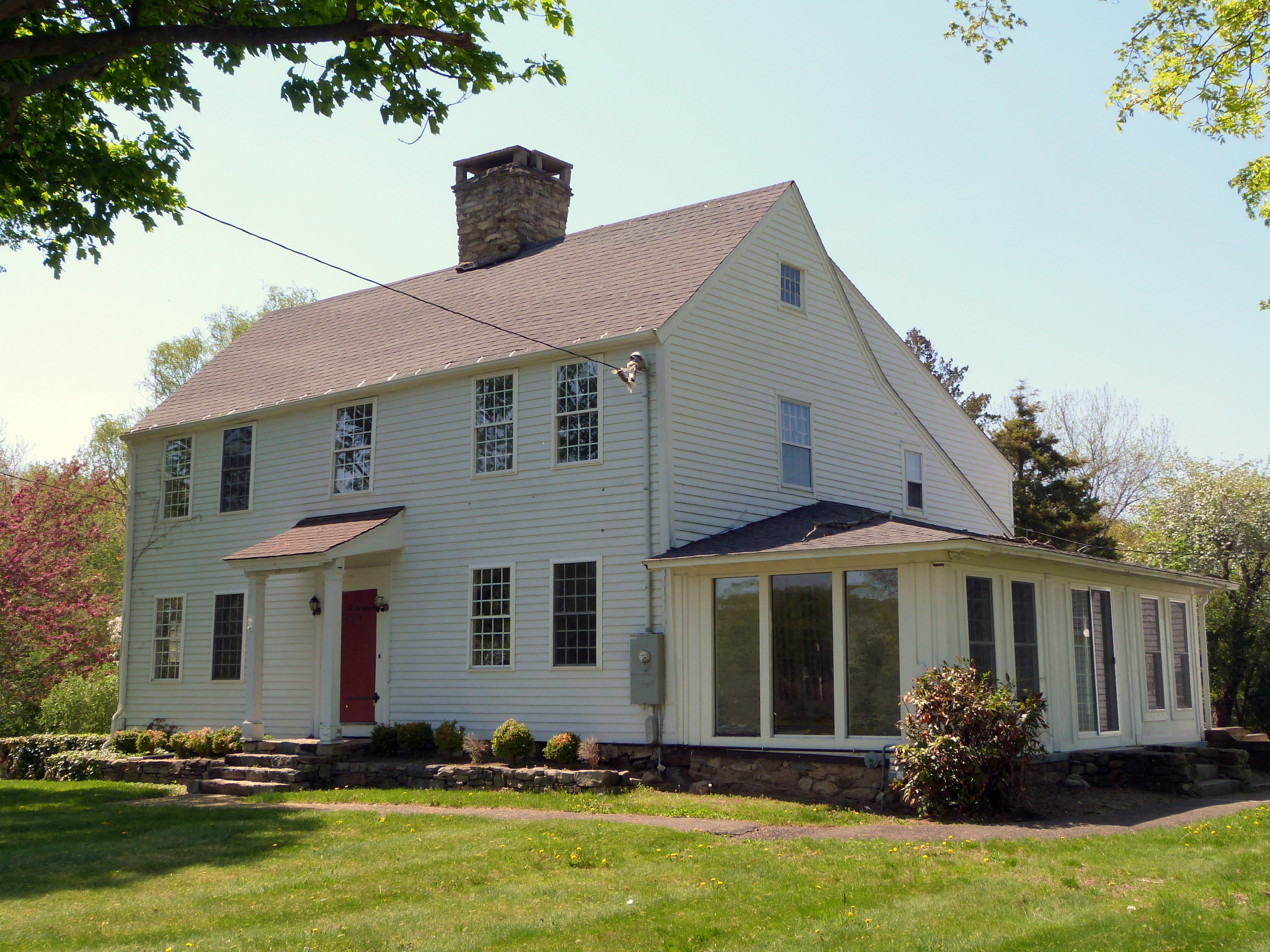
- The John Tyler House in 2015

- Location within Connecticut Location within the United States
- Location: 242-250 East Main Street, Branford, Connecticut
- Coordinates: 41°17′29″N 72°47′46″W
- Area: 0.5 acres (0.20 ha)
- Built: 1710
- Built by: Tyler, John, Jr.
- Architectural style: Colonial
- MPS: Colonial Houses of Branford TR
- NRHP reference No.: 88002635
- Added to NRHP: December 1, 1988

The John Tyler House is a historic house at 242–250 East Main Street in Branford, Connecticut. Built about 1710, it is one of the town's few surviving 18th-century residences, and a good example of late First Period architecture. The house was listed on the National Register of Historic Places in 1988.

== Description and history ==
The John Tyler House stands in eastern Branford, at the northwest corner of East Main Street (United States Route 1) and Mill Plain Road. It is a 2 1/2-story wood-frame structure, five bays wide, with a side gable roof, a large central chimney, and clapboard siding. The main roof is more steeply pitched than typical period houses, and gives way at the back to a rear leanto section, added at an unknown (but probably 18th century) date. A more modern extension has further elevated the rear leanto. The front facade has sash windows arranged symmetrically around the center entrance, which is sheltered by a shed-roof portico supported by square columns. A modern single-story hip-roof ell extends to the right of the main block, and a smaller shed-roof ell further extends the leanto to the rear. The interior follows a typical period center-chimney plan, with parlors on either side of the chimney, and a long kitchen space behind.

The house is estimated to have been built about 1710 by John Tyler, Jr. on land originally granted to his father George. It is one of Branford's small number of 18th-century houses, and a well-preserved example of houses of that period.

== See also ==
- List of the oldest buildings in Connecticut
- Solomon Tyler House, which stands nearby
- National Register of Historic Places listings in New Haven County, Connecticut
