= J. Frederick Kelly =

American architect and historian (1888–1947)

- Born: May 20, 1888; Lowville, New York, United States
- Died: September 2, 1947 (aged 59); Hamden, Connecticut, United States
- Occupation: Architect

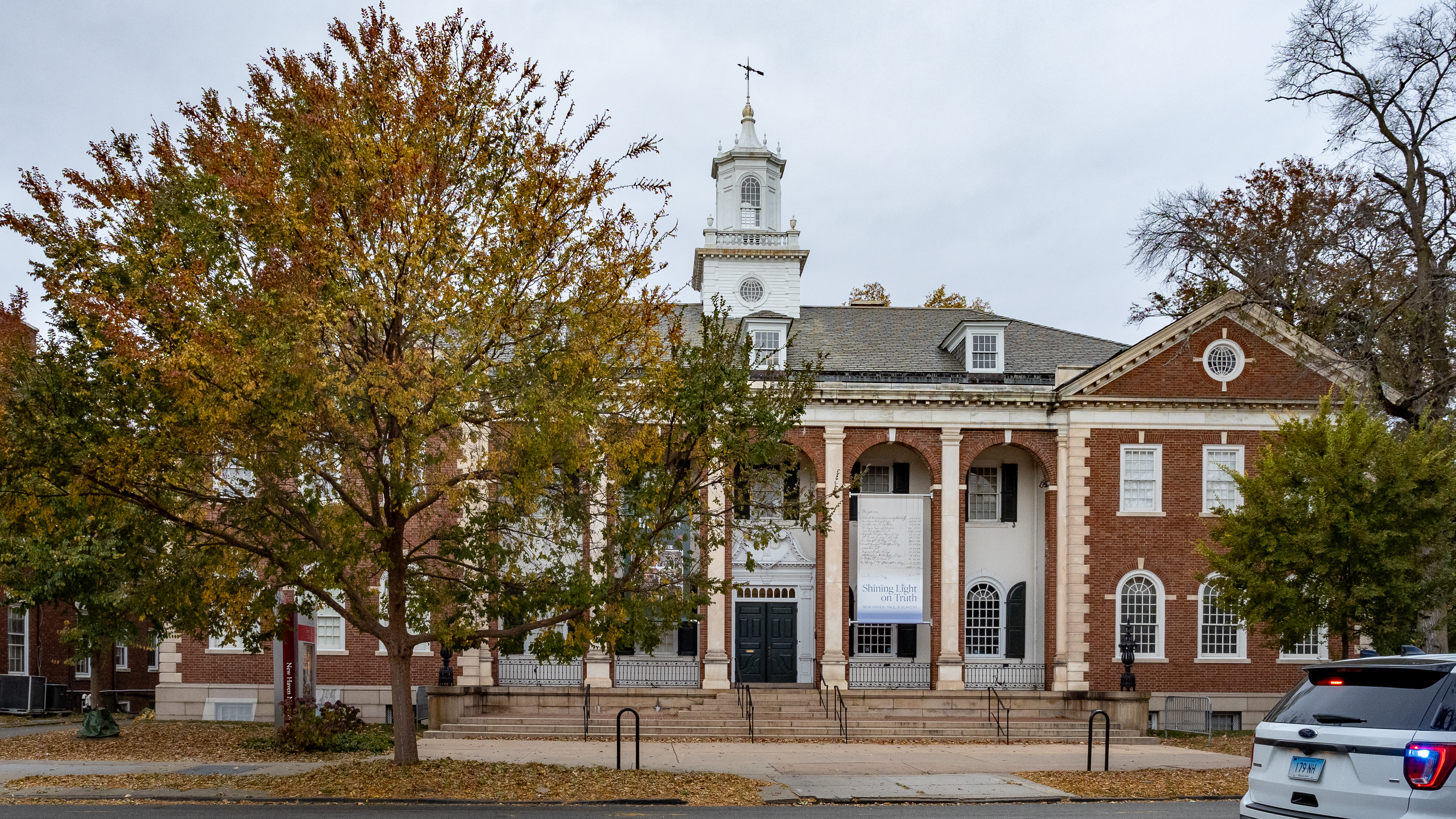
The New Haven Museum and Historical Society, designed by Kelly in the Colonial Revival style and completed in 1929

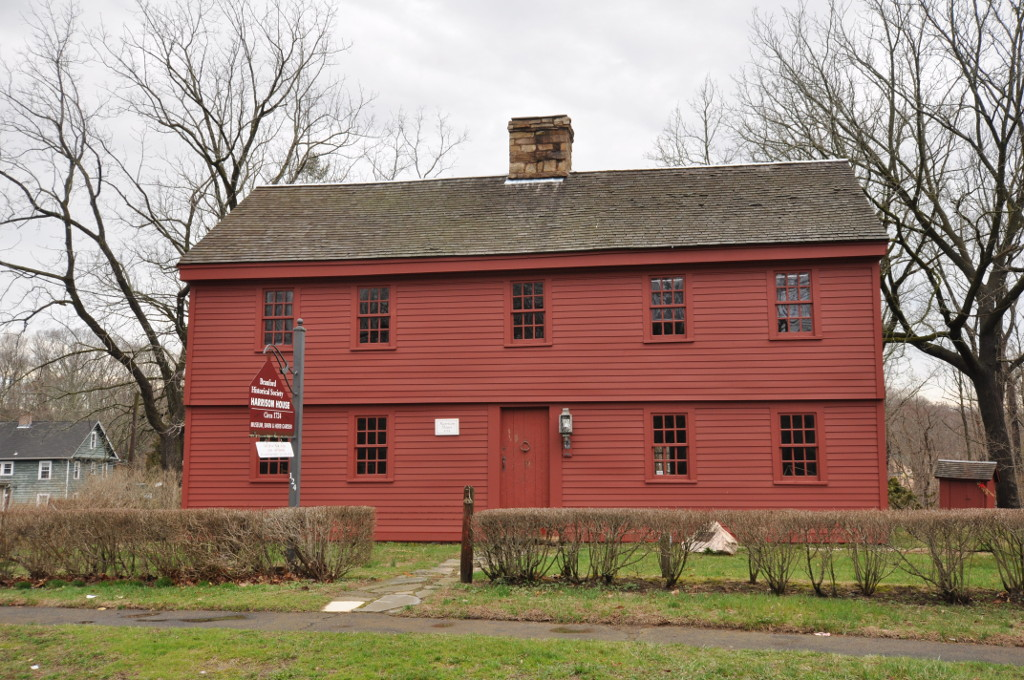
The Harrison House Museum in Branford, originally built in 1724 and restored by Kelly beginning in 1938

J. Frederick Kelly (June 20, 1888 – September 2, 1947) was an American architect and architectural historian, noted for his writing on the colonial architecture of Connecticut. In his day he was regarded as the leading architectural historian in Connecticut.

== Life and career ==
John Frederick Kelly was born June 20, 1888, in Lowville, New York, to John D. Kelly, a physician, and Mariana Kelly, née Schraub. He was raised in Hamden and was educated at Yale University, earning a BFA in 1912. He was awarded the William Wirt Winchester Traveling Fellowship, which enabled him to study architecture at the École Spéciale d'Architecture in Paris for a year. He worked for an unidentified New Haven architect from 1913 until 1915, when he opened his own office. During World War I he served in the civil engineering corps of the United States Naval Reserve and was stationed in Brooklyn.

After the war he resumed practice in New Haven. In 1920 he briefly practiced in partnership with Richard Williams, one of the architects of the New Haven County Courthouse (1917). He then continued independently until 1928, when he formed the partnership of Kelly & Kelly with his younger brother, Henry S. Kelly. Kelly developed an architectural practice based around preservation and restoration. He was involved in the restoration of the Harrison House Museum in Branford, the Nehemiah Royce House in Wallingford and the Henry Whitfield House in Guilford. He designed relatively few new buildings, mostly houses. His most prominent work is the New Haven Museum and Historical Society (1929). As an eclectic Colonial Revivalist architect, Kelly borrowed liberally from many sources. The New Haven Museum references Charles Bulfinch's First Church of Christ, Unitarian (1817), in Lancaster, Massachusetts, as well as the vernacular colonial houses of rural Connecticut.

Though well-known as an architect, Kelly was best-remembered as an architectural historian. His publications included The Early Domestic Architecture of Connecticut (New Haven: Yale University Press, 1924), Early Connecticut Architecture (New York: William Helburn, 1924 and 1931) and Early Connecticut Meetinghouses (New York: Columbia University Press, 1948). He was chairman of the subcommittee on architecture for the Connecticut Tercentenary Commission. Kelly and George Dudley Seymour were the primary biographers of David Hoadley, a carpenter-architect active in New Haven during the second quarter of the nineteenth century. According to Elizabeth Mills Brown, a later biographer of Hoadley, Kelly and Seymour were guilty of "excessive local adulation" of Hoadley, raising him to the level of an artistic genius, making his true role as an architect "hard to assess."

== Personal life and death ==
Kelly was a member of the New Haven Colony Historical Society, the Walpole Society, the American Institute of Architects, the Society for the Preservation of New England Antiquities and the Hamden Historical Society.

Kelly never married. He died September 2, 1947.

== Bibliography ==
- The Early Domestic Architecture of Connecticut (New Haven: Yale University Press, 1924)
- Early Connecticut Architecture 1 (New York: William Helburn, 1924)
- Early Connecticut Architecture 2 (New York: William Helburn, 1931)
- Early Connecticut Meetinghouses (New York: Columbia University Press, 1948)
