= Sabbathday House =

Sabbathday House or Sabbath Day House may refer to:

- Sabbathday House (Guilford, Connecticut), listed on the National Register of Historic Places in New Haven County, Connecticut
- Sabbath Day House (Billerica, Massachusetts), listed on the National Register of Historic Places in Massachusetts
