= Comfort Starr =

English physician (1589–1659)

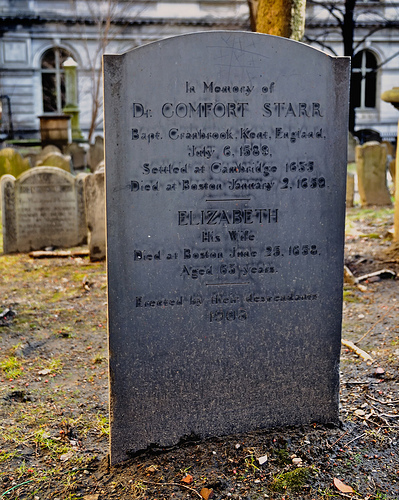
- Starr's headstone in Boston
- Born: 6 July 1589; Cranbrook, Kent; Kingdom of England
- Died: 2 January 1659 (aged 69); Boston, Massachusetts Bay Colony
- Resting place: King's Chapel Burying Ground; Boston, Massachusetts, U.S.
- Occupation: Physician
- Spouse: Elizabeth Watts (m. 1613; died 1658)

Comfort Starr (6 July 1589 – 2 January 1659) was a 17th-century English physician who emigrated to the Thirteen Colonies. He was one of the founders of Harvard College, serving as a member of the earliest incarnation of the President and Fellows of Harvard College.

== Early life ==
Starr was born in Cranbrook, Kent, on 6 July 1589. He was one of the seventeen children of Thomas Starr.

== Emigration ==
In 1635, aged 45, Starr left the Kingdom of England aboard the Hercules, which launched from Sandwich, Kent. He settled in Cambridge, Colony of Massachusetts Bay, where he was a founder of Harvard College the following year. He came with three of his children and three servants; his wife followed with most of the other children. One of his daughters did not emigrate until after his death.

His sister, Suretrust, also emigrated, and lived in Charlestown, Colony of Massachusetts Bay, with her husband Faithful Rouse.

== Personal life ==
Prior to his family's emigration, Starr was a warden at St Mary's Parish Church in Ashford, Kent, where he also had a surgery.

Starr married Elizabeth Watts on 4 October 1614. They had nine children: Thomas (1615–1658), Judith (1617–1622), Mary (1620), Elizabeth (1621–1704), Comfort (1624–1711), John (1626–1704), Samuel (1628–1633), Hannah (1632–1662) and Lydia (1634–1653). Mary married John Maynard in 1640. Calvin Coolidge, the 30th president of the United States, was a descendant of John.

After arriving in the Massachusetts Bay, in 1635 he purchased the homestead of William Peyntree in Duxbury. The family moved to Boston just over a decade later.

Their grandson, Comfort Starr (1666–1743), built the Comfort Starr House in Guilford, Connecticut Colony, in 1695.

== Death ==
Starr died on 2 January 1659, aged 69, just over six months after the death of his wife. They are buried in King's Chapel Burying Ground in Boston. A memorial plaque to Starr was installed in St Dunstan's Church in Cranbrook, Kent, where he was baptised.
