= Griswold House (Guilford, Connecticut) =

Historic house in Connecticut, United States

- U.S. National Register of Historic Places
- U.S. Historic district – Contributing property
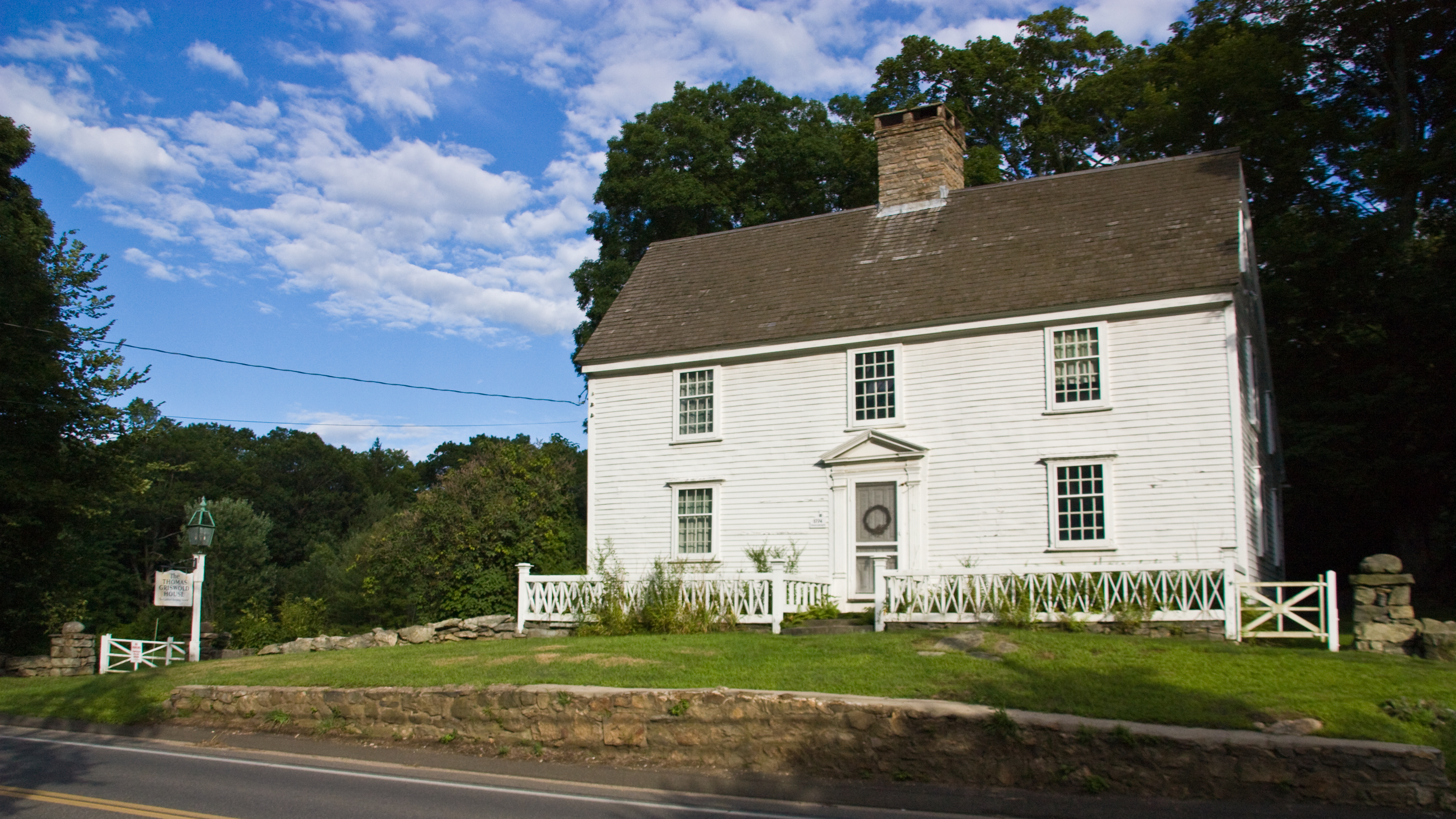

- Location within Connecticut Location within the United States
- Location: 171 Boston Street, Guilford, Connecticut
- Coordinates: 41°17′0″N 72°40′29″W
- Area: 1 acre (0.40 ha)
- Architectural style: Colonial
- Part of: Guilford Historic Town Center (ID76001988)
- NRHP reference No.: 75001929

Significant dates
- Added to NRHP: October 10, 1975
- Designated CP: July 6, 1976

The Griswold House is a historic house museum at 171 Boston Street in Guilford, Connecticut. Built about 1764, it is a well-preserved example of New England colonial architecture, and was listed on the National Register of Historic Places in 1975. The Guilford Keeping Society operates the house as the Thomas Griswold House Museum. The museum includes the late 18th century period New England saltbox house, a historic blacksmith shop, a barn with farm tools and implements, two corn cribs and a Victorian era three seat outhouse. The museum is open seasonally from June through October on a limited number of days each week.

== Description and history ==
The Griswold House is located east of Guilford Center, on the south side of Boston Street (Connecticut Route 146) at its junction with Lovers Lane. It is a 2 1/2-story wood-frame structure, with a gabled roof, large central chimney, and clapboarded exterior. A leanto section to the rear gives the house a classic New England saltbox appearance. The main facade is three bays wide, with sash windows arranged symmetrically around the entrance. The entrance is flanked by pilasters and topped by a fully pedimented gable.

The house was probably built around 1764 by Thomas Griswold III for one of his sons. It remained in the hands of his descendants until 1958, when it was acquired by the Guilford Keeping Society. The society undertook two major restorations, one in the 1970s and another in the 1990s. In addition to its use as a museum, it serves as the society's headquarters.

== See also ==
- National Register of Historic Places listings in New Haven County, Connecticut
