= Dudleytown =

Dudleytown may refer to:

- Dudleytown, Connecticut, a ghost town nestled in the Appalachian Mountains of Litchfield County, Connecticut in the Town of Cornwall, United States
- Dudleytown, Indiana, an unincorporated place in Jackson County, United States
- Dudleytown Historic District, Guilford, Connecticut, United States
- Dudley Town F.C., a football club in the West Midlands, England
