= Thomas Burgis II House =

Historic house in Connecticut, United States

- U.S. National Register of Historic Places
- U.S. Historic district – Contributing property
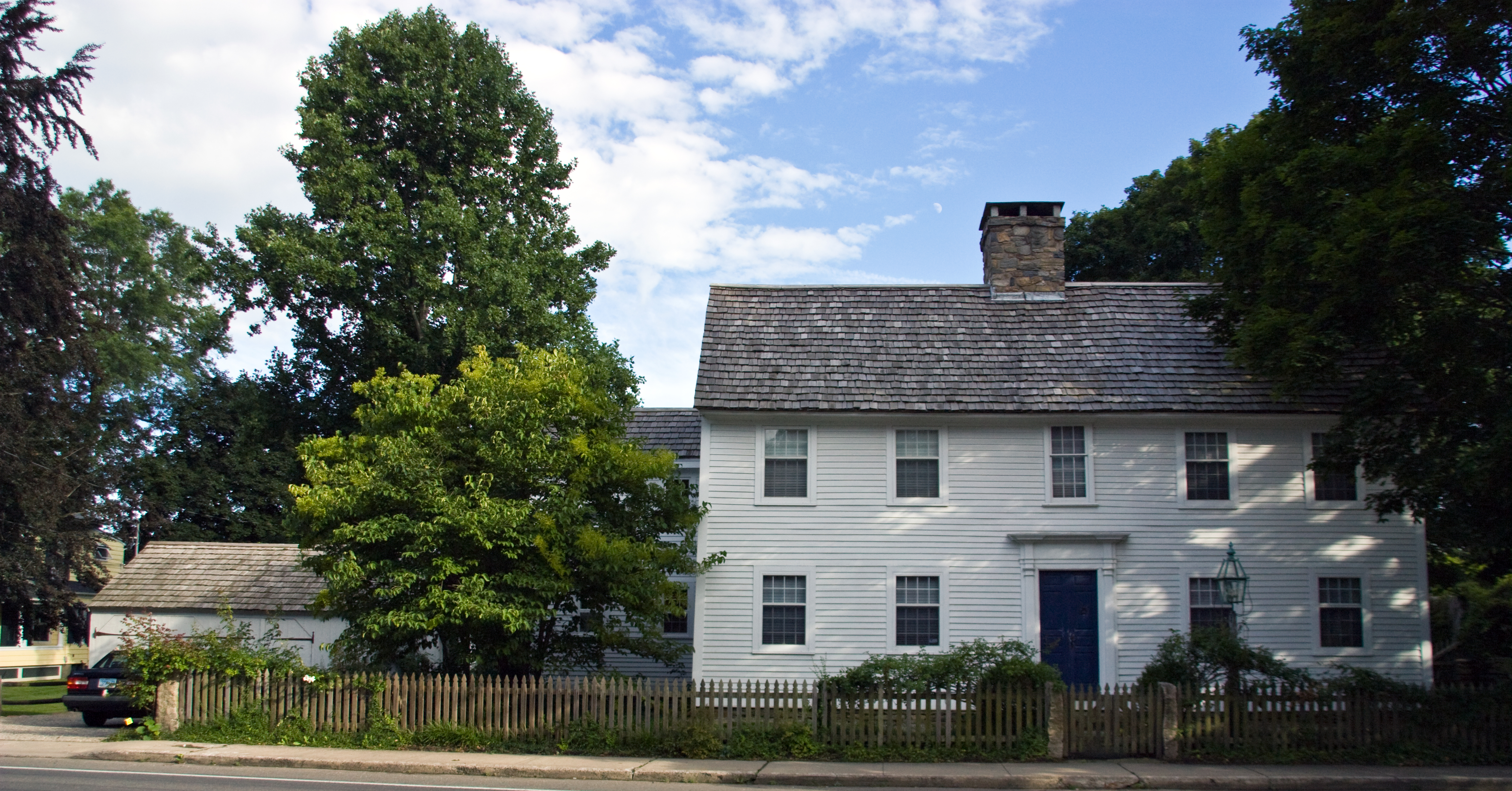

- Location within Connecticut Location within the United States
- Location: 85 Boston Street, Guilford, Connecticut
- Coordinates: 41°16′56″N 72°40′41″W
- Area: 0.3 acres (0.12 ha)
- Built: c. 1735
- Architectural style: Colonial, Federal
- Part of: Guilford Historic Town Center (ID76001988)
- NRHP reference No.: 00001562

Significant dates
- Added to NRHP: December 28, 2000
- Designated CP: July 6, 1976

The Thomas Burgis II House is a historic house at 85 Boston Street in Guilford, Connecticut. With a construction history dating to about 1735, it is one of Guilford's finest and best-documented colonial-era houses, standing on property with a documented history to the 17th century. The house was listed on the National Register of Historic Places in 2000.

== Description and history ==
The Thomas Burgis II House is located east of the Guilford village green, on the south side of Boston Street (Connecticut Route 146) between Graves Avenue and Pearl Street. It is a 2 1/2-story wood-frame structure, with a gabled roof, central chimney, and clapboarded exterior. Its main facade is five bays, with a center entrance framed by pilasters and a corniced entablature. The rear roof face extends to the first floor, giving the house a saltbox profile. The walls are plank-framed, and elements of the house's post and beam framing are exposed on the interior. Other surviving interior features include oak floors and builtin cabinetry. A wing extends to the main block's left.

The oldest portion of the house, the front portion of the main block, dates to c. 1735, and was extended c. 1800 to give it the present saltbox configuration. It is one of Guilford's oldest and best-documented houses. Thomas Burgis, for whose like-named son it was built, was a remarkably successful cordwainer (shoemaker), who also operated a tannery. The house was sold out of the family in 1874, and was given a major restoration in the 1990s.

== See also ==
- National Register of Historic Places listings in New Haven County, Connecticut
