= Rotberg =

Rotberg may refer to:

- Rotberg (Schönefeld), former German municipality, since 1998 part of Schönefeld-Waltersdorf
- Rotberg Castle in Metzerlen-Mariastein, Switzerland

== People ==
- Dana Rotberg (born 1960), Mexican film director
- Eduard Anton von Rotberg (1799–1884), Bavarian general
- Eugene Rotberg (1930–2025), American lawyer and banker
- Robert I. Rotberg (born 1935), American academic
- Tõnis Rotberg (1882–1953), Estonian general

== See also ==
- Rotberger
- Rothberg
- Rødberg
