= Edward Ruggles Landon =

American politician and judge (1813–1883)

Member of the Connecticut House of Representatives
- In office 1870–1871

Member of the Connecticut State Senate
- In office 1856–1857

Personal details
- Born: May 31, 1813 Guilford, Connecticut, U.S.
- Died: July 25, 1883 (aged 70) Guilford, Connecticut, U.S.
- Resting place: Alderbrook Cemetery
- Spouses: Anna Theodore Lay (m. 1838; died 1838) Parnel C. Hotchkiss (m. 1871)
- Children: 1
- Education: Yale College
- Occupation: Politician; lawyer; judge

Edward Ruggles Landon (May 31, 1813 – July 25, 1883) was a Connecticut politician and judge.

== Early life ==
Edward Ruggles Landon was born on May 31, 1813, in Guilford, Connecticut, to Mary (née Griswold) and Nathaniel Ruggles Landon. His father was a merchant. Landon graduated from Yale College in 1833. He then studied law in New Haven, Connecticut and in Detroit, Michigan.

== Career ==
Landon began practicing law in Tecumseh, Michigan. In December 1838, he returned to Guilford and practiced law there until his death.

In 1848, Landon was selected as town clerk. In 1854, he became a probate judge. He was repeatedly re-elected to both roles until his death. He served as a member of the Connecticut Senate in 1856 and as a member of the Connecticut House of Representatives in 1870. He served as principal magistrate of Guilford.

== Personal life ==
Landon married Anna "Annie" Theodora Lay on January 1, 1838. She died in September 1838 with their only child. He married Parnel C. Hotchkiss of Guilford on October 5, 1871. They had no children.

Landon died of gastric fever and disease of the nervous system on July 25, 1883, in Guilford. He was buried in Alderbrook Cemetery.
