= Bishop's Orchards =

Farm in Connecticut

Coordinates: 41°17′24.2″N 72°41′41.3″W

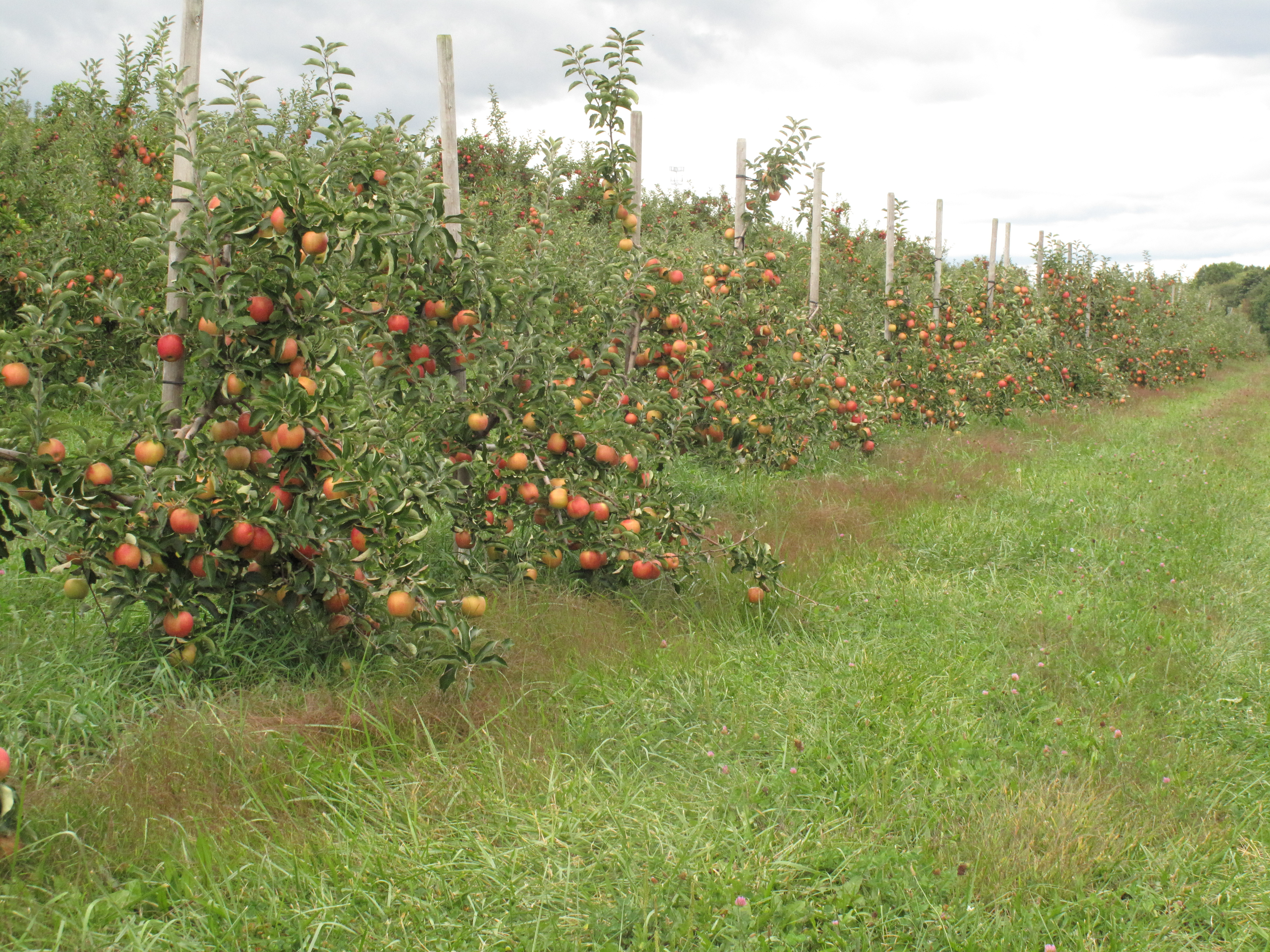
Bishop's Orchards

Bishop's Orchards is an agricultural operation in Guilford, Connecticut, that serves as a farm, retail market, tourist attraction and winery.

Bishop's Orchards began operating as a family farm in 1871 (154 years ago). Over the years, Bishop's Orchards expanded to a 313-acre (1.27 km^{2}) farm, with the Bishop family members maintaining control of all duties ranging from corporate decision-making to retail operations to crop maintenance. In 2007, the Bishop family members created a 10-year stock purchase and loan program to ensure a continuation of family ownership.

Bishop's Orchards has attracted tourism via its retail market and seasonal apple- and pumpkin-picking programs; visits by local school groups are also coordinated.

== Wind turbine ==
In July 2010, the owners of Bishop's Orchards completed a two-year study to determine the feasibility of a wind turbine on their property. Utilizing a 197 feet (60 m) tower to measure wind speed and direction, it was determined that while it was not economical at this time, the project could be revisited over the next decade.

== Winery ==
The Bishop's Orchards Winery sells fruit wines made from the apples, peaches, pears and raspberries grown at the farm. It is on the Eastern Connecticut Wine Trail.

== Wine festival ==
The Shoreline Wine Festival has been held annually at Bishop's Orchards since August 2006. The festival features wineries from the Connecticut Wine Trail as well as any Connecticut producers.
