= Meeting House Hill Historic District =

Historic district in Connecticut, United States

- U.S. National Register of Historic Places
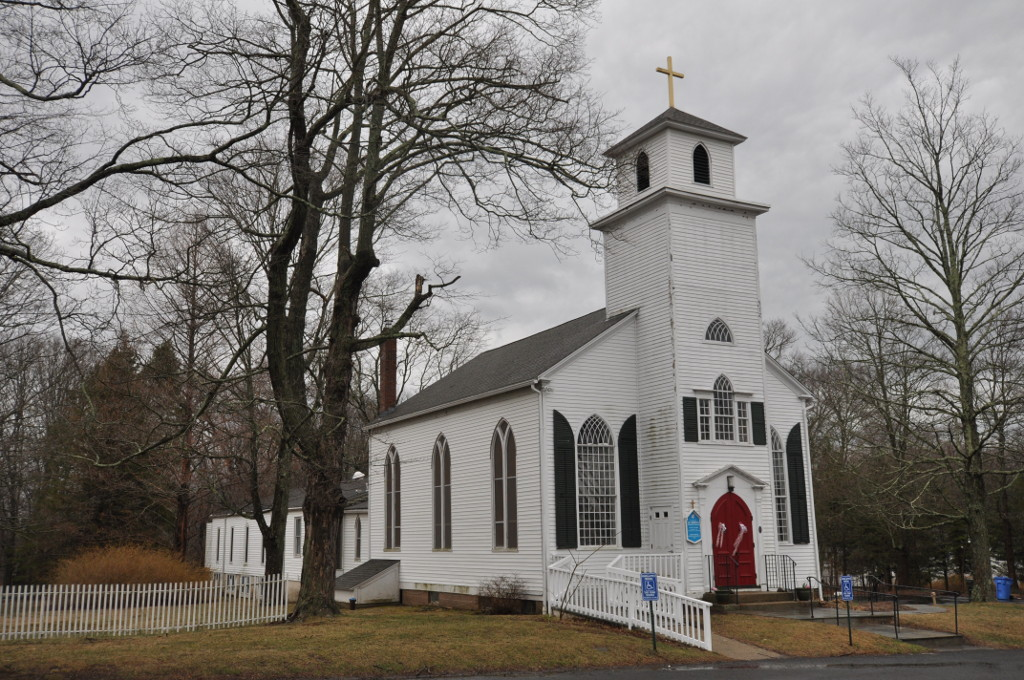
- St. John's Episcopal Church

- Location within Connecticut Location within the United States
- Location: Roughly bounded by Long Hill, Great Hill, and Ledge Hill Roads, Guilford, Connecticut
- Coordinates: 41°22′0″N 72°43′42″W
- Area: 16 acres (6.5 ha)
- Built: 1812
- Architect: Coan, Abraham; Granbery, E. Carleton
- Architectural style: Greek Revival, Gothic, Federal
- NRHP reference No.: 87002132
- Added to NRHP: December 14, 1987

The Meeting House Hill Historic District encompasses the historic religious center of North Guilford, Connecticut. Located on Ledge Hill Road, the district includes two churches (along with their appended halls and parsonages), a cemetery, and Ledge Hill Road itself, which dates to the early 18th century. The arrangement is reflective of a spirit of religious tolerance that manifested in the early 19th century, allowing churches from two different congregations (Congregationalist and Episcopalian) to heal long-standing divisions. The district was listed on the National Register of Historic Places in 1987.

== Description and history ==
North Guilford was an agricultural outpost of the town of Guilford from its early settlement. In 1705, land was set aside for a common, and in 1717 land was allocated for a meeting house and cemetery. The local population was at the time strongly Congregationalist, and the town levied church taxes that supported the Congregational church that was built there. In 1747, a segment of the North Guilford population formally declared itself for the Church of England, and built a second church at a location to the south. These adherents objected to the church tax, leading to acrimonious disputes in the town. In the early 19th century, a spirit of reconciliation prevailed, and the Congregationalists agreed to permit the Episcopalian successors to the Anglicans to build their church on land adjacent to theirs.

Meetinghouse Hill is located in rural northern Guilford, occupying a prominent hilltop location. It is accessed via Ledge Hill Road, which was laid out in the early 18th century to provide access to the site. The cemetery is on the west side of the road, and the buildings of the two churches are located on the east side. The North Guilford Congregational Church is the northern of the two churches: it is a Federal style building constructed in 1812–1814 by Abraham Coan. To its south stands St. John's Episcopal Church, also built about 1812–1814, is a more eclectic mix of Classical and Gothic elements, reflective of alterations made in the late 19th and early 20th centuries. The Congregational church is accompanied by an 1823 parsonage and a Victorian (1887–88) parish hall that now houses a school. Adjacent to St. John's stands its former rectory, a Greek Revival house built in 1851.

== See also ==
- National Register of Historic Places listings in New Haven County, Connecticut
