= Wilfred Armster =

American architect (1938–2019)

Wilfred Amster
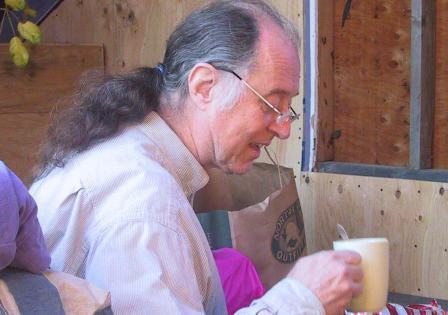
- Born: Wilfred John Oskar Armster; September 11, 1938; The Bronx, New York USA
- Died: May 13, 2019 (aged 80); Guilford, Connecticut, U.S.
- Occupation: Architect

Wilfred John Oskar Armster (September 11, 1938 – May 13, 2019) was an American architect and principal of the Connecticut-based Wilfred Armster Architects.

== Education and early work ==
Armster was born in Manhattan in 1938, and raised in The Bronx, New York, until beginning college in 1956. After graduating from Stuyvesant High School in Manhattan, Armster studied at several schools and colleges, including Gettysburg and Syracuse, and studied architecture at the Technical University of Munich, eventually completing his a degree in architecture at the University of Michigan in 1964. He began his career at the Detroit offices of Smith, Hinchman & Grylls in the mid-1960s. After moving to CT in 1968 and working in New Haven, CT for Kevin Roche John Dinkeloo Associates in the late 1960s, Armster established his own firm in Guilford, CT, in 1971.

Armster died on May 13, 2019, at the age of 80.

== Residential projects ==
Farmington Bridge House, 1981

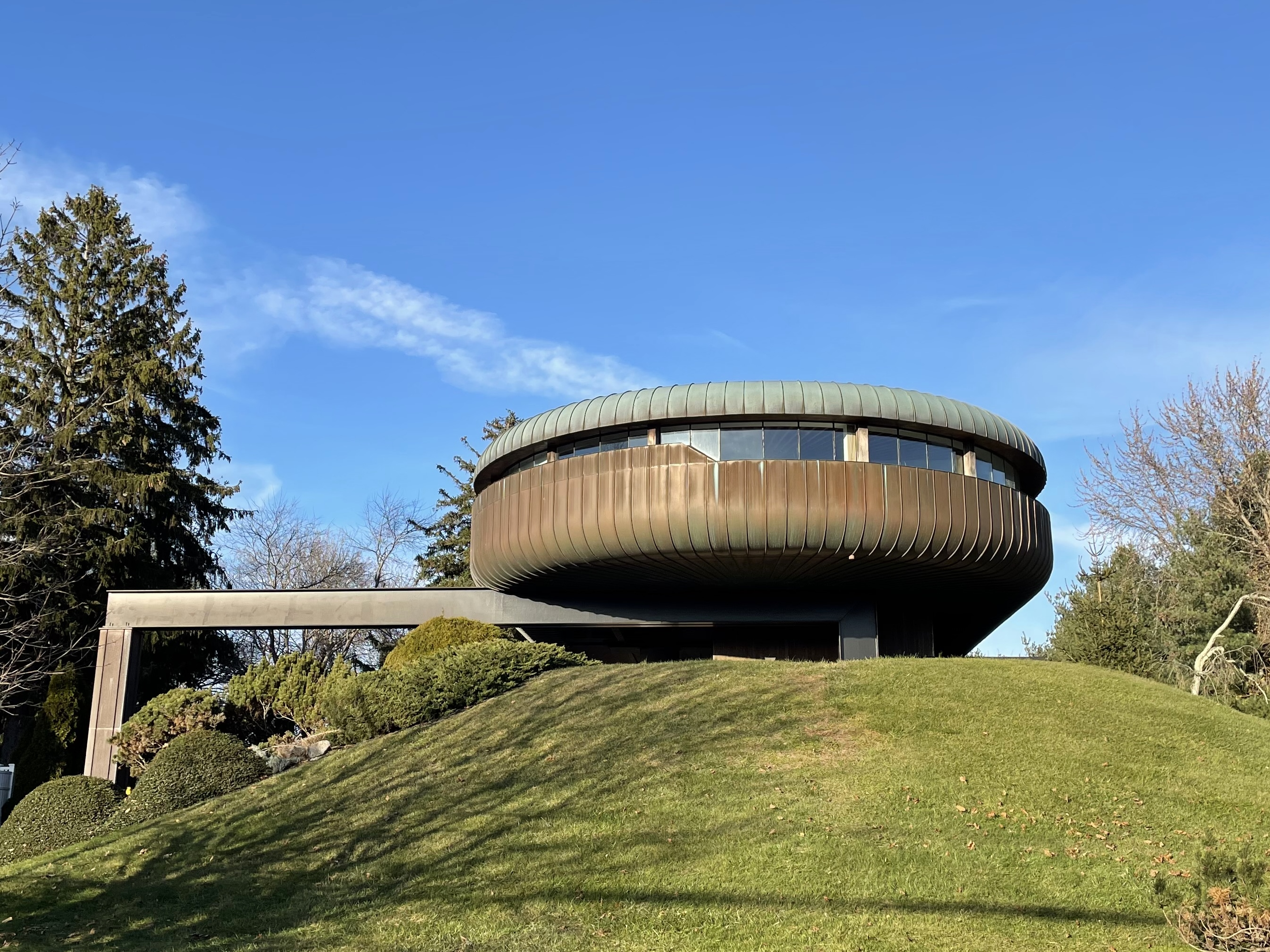
"Spaceship" building, Guilford, CT

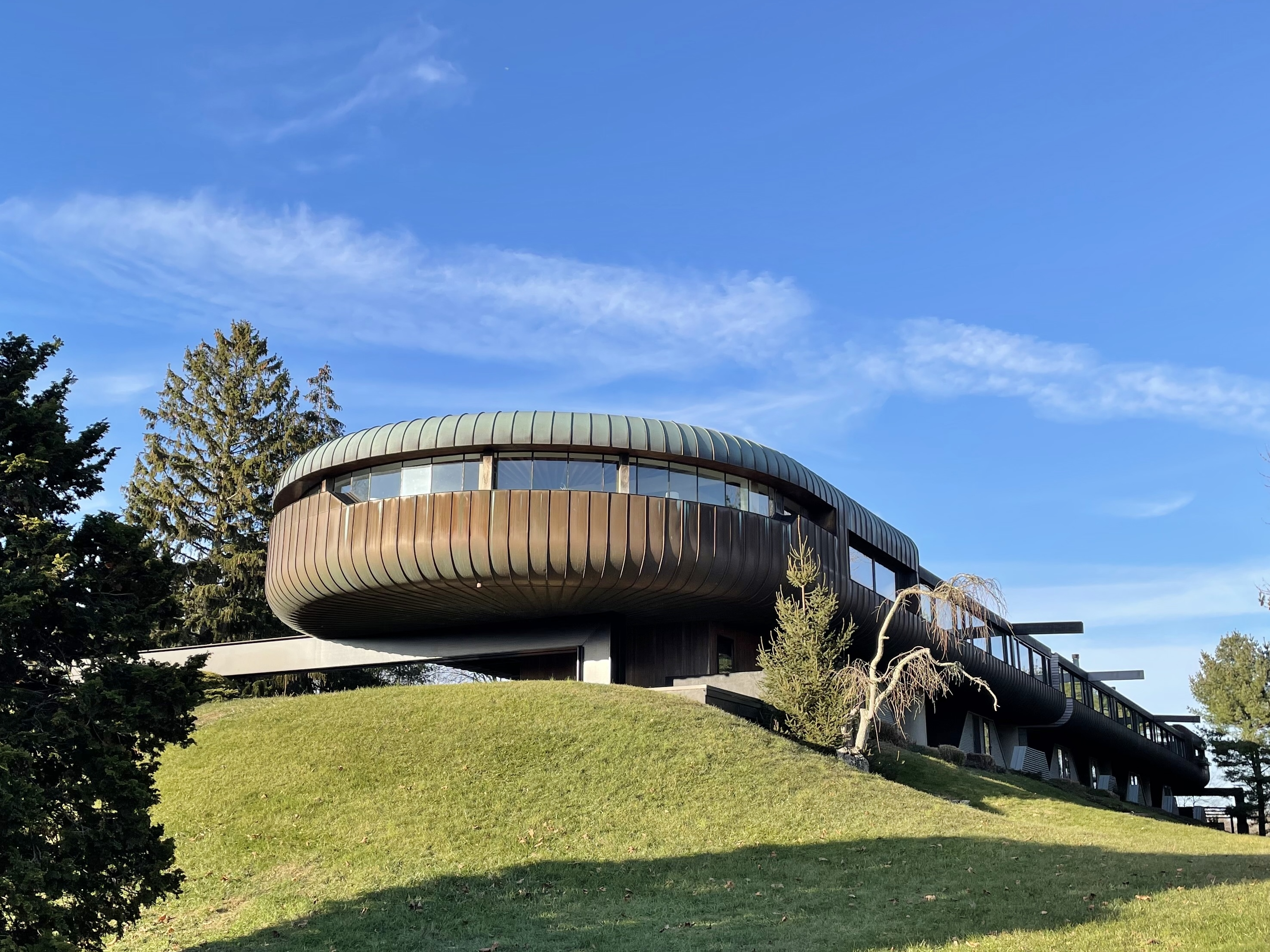
This unusually-shaped building houses high-end condos

Armster’s geometrically austere structures contain frequent references to bridges, walls and holes, and usually feature at least one side with no openings or windows. Many of his residential buildings were designed for difficult, steeply sloped lots. He won his first AIA Award for The Bridge House in Farmington, CT, a toppled “L”-form built on a steeply wooded site, pictured here. A later Bridge House by Armster is located in Ann Arbor, MI, and features a 120-foot span over a meadow between two hills. The Ann Arbor project won the AIA Connecticut 2009 Design Award, whose jury cited the project’s “taut simplicity.”

Armster’s projects are frequently constructed with minimum changes to the natural state of the sites on which they are built. Several have had trees growing through them, though some have been removed by owners. His inclination to leave the trees as close to his buildings remained with him throughout his life and career, including in his own home.

Armster's 1987 project in Guilford, Connecticut, an elongated copper-clad structure, was initially opposed by local residents who felt its modernist form was incompatible with the town’s colonial heritage. However, the building has become a well recognized and accepted landmark in the decades since.

== Awards ==
- CSA AIA Award, 1981 – Farmington Bridge House, Farmington, CT
- AIA Connecticut 2009 Design Award – Bridge House, Ann Arbor, MI

== Publications ==
- South Carolina Architecture 1970-2000, Clemson University Press, pp, 64-65
