= Medad Stone Tavern =

Historic house in Connecticut, United States

- U.S. National Register of Historic Places
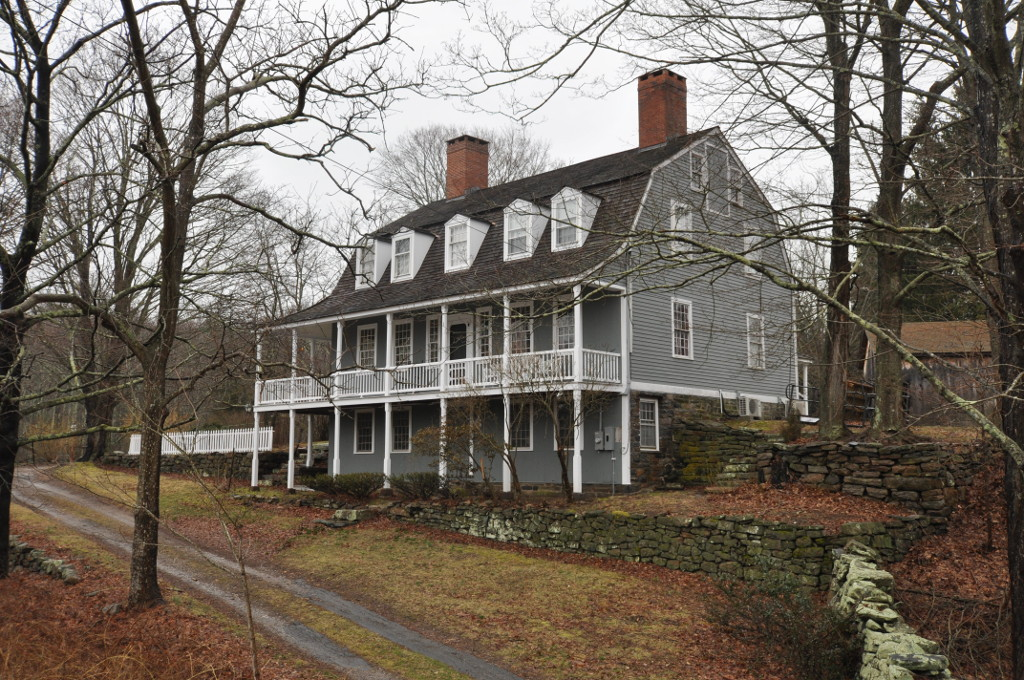

- Location within Connecticut Location within the United States
- Location: 171 Three Mile Course, Guilford, Connecticut
- Coordinates: 41°17′03″N 72°41′46″W
- Area: 9.7 acres (3.9 ha)
- Built: 1803
- Architectural style: Federal
- NRHP reference No.: 08001378
- Added to NRHP: January 30, 2009

The Medad Stone Tavern is a historic house museum at 171 Three Mile Course in Guilford, Connecticut. Built in 1803 but never actually used as a tavern, it is well-preserved example of early 19th-century Federal period architecture. It is now maintained as a museum by a local historical society, the Guilford Keeping Society. It was listed on the National Register of Historic Places in 2009.

== Description and history ==
The Medad Stone Tavern is located in a rural-residential setting west of Guilford Center, on the west side of Three Mile Course just south of a stream which feeds the West River. It is a 2 1/2-story wood-frame structure, with a gambrel roof and clapboarded exterior, set on a sloping lot which exposes the entire front of the basement level. The roof is pierced by five gabled dormers, with brick chimneys set near the ends. The front facade is covered by a shed-roof porch that appears two stories in height due to the basement frontage. The main facade is five bays wide, with sash windows and a central entrance. The entrance is flanked by wide sidelight windows. The house is set on about 10 acres (4.0 ha) along with a barn, corn crib, and garage.

The structure was built in 1803 by Medad Stone, along what was then a proposed new route for the Boston Post Road. Stone intended to operate a tavern here, but because the road was never realigned, he never did so, and it was only used as a private residence. It was occupied by the Davis family, who farmed the surrounding land for nearly 200 years. In 2001, the Davises gave the house to the Guilford Keeping Society, which has restored it and opened it as a museum.

== See also ==
- National Register of Historic Places listings in New Haven County, Connecticut
