= Westwoods Trails =

Hiking trail system in Connecticut

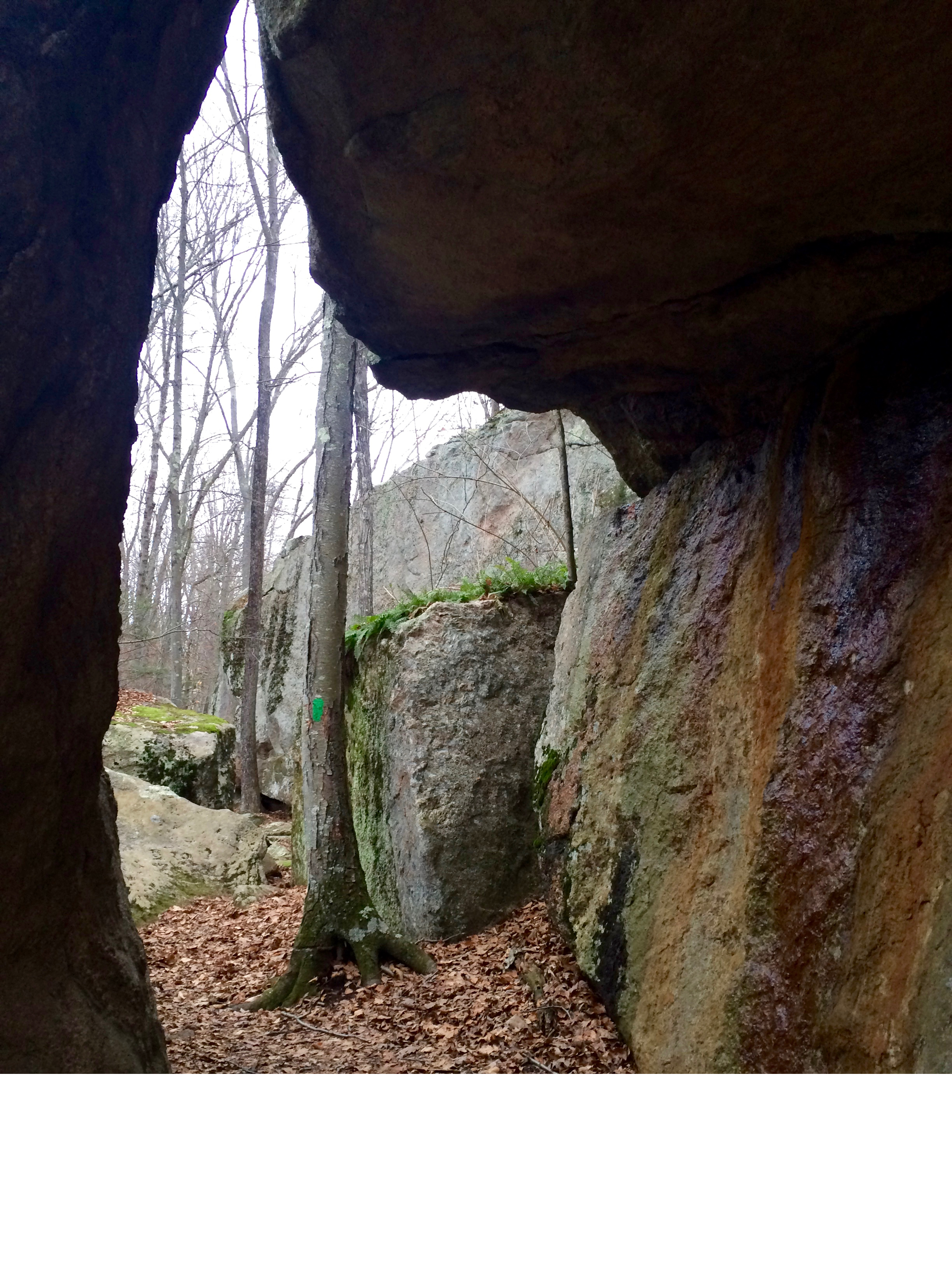
- On the Green Rectangle Trail passing through a rock cave in the Westwoods Preserve, Guilford Connecticut, USA.
- Length: 39.0 mi (62.8 km)
- Location: Guilford, Connecticut, USA
- Designation: CT400, Listed in Connecticut Walk Book East
- Use: hiking, cross-country skiing, snowshoeing, fishing, geocaching, limited hunting, mountain biking, other
- Hazards: deer ticks, poison ivy

The Westwoods Trails is an extensive hiking trail system in Guilford, Connecticut. The trail system has approximately 39 miles (63 km) of trails with features including caves, lakes, streams, rivers, and interesting rock formations. The preserve extends across land owned by the Guilford Land Conservation Trust, which also owns many other land parcels across the town which provide hiking trails, and the State of Connecticut. The trails are accessible for walking, running, and mountain biking. Hunting is only allowed on state land during the season.

== Trail description ==
The Westwoods Trails is primarily used for hiking, mountain biking, backpacking, picnicking, and in the winter, snowshoeing.

Portions of the trail are suitable for, and are used for, cross-country skiing and geocaching. Site-specific activities enjoyed along the route include bird watching, hunting (very limited), fishing, horseback riding, bouldering and rock climbing (limited).

=== Trail communities ===
The Westwoods Trails are completely contained in the western section of Guilford, Connecticut. It is very close to the Branford, Connecticut border however and the 'Green Trail' connects the WestWoods Trails to the Stony Creek Quarry Trails System in Branford, CT.

== History and folklore ==
The Westwoods Trails are maintained on behalf of the land trust by the Westwoods Trails Committee.

== Hiking the trail ==
The trails are blazed with several colors as well as shapes. Trail descriptions and maps are available from a number of commercial and non-commercial sources, and a complete guide to the WestWoods Trails is published in the Connecticut Walk Book East by the Connecticut Forest and Park Association

Weather along the route is typical of Connecticut. Conditions on exposed ridge tops and summits may be harsher during cold or stormy weather. Lightning is a hazard on exposed summits and ledges during thunderstorms. Snow is common in the winter and may necessitate the use of snowshoes. Ice can form on exposed ledges and summits, making hiking dangerous without special equipment.

Biting insects can be bothersome during warm weather. Parasitic deer ticks (which are known to carry Lyme disease) are a potential hazard. Wearing bright orange clothing during the hunting season (Fall through December) is recommended.

== See also ==
- Blue-Blazed Trails
