= Rothberg =

Rothberg is a surname. Notable people with the surname include:

- Bob Rothberg (1901–1938), songwriter
- Jonathan M. Rothberg (born 1963), American scientist and entrepreneur
- Justin Rothberg (born 2002), American racing driver
- Patti Rothberg (born 1972), American musician and artist
- Künter Rothberg (born 1984), Estonian judoka

== See also ==
- Rothberg Institute For Childhood Diseases
- Roșia, Sibiu Commune, Sibiu County, Romania
