= Comfort Starr House =

Coordinates: 41.2889°N 72.6824°W

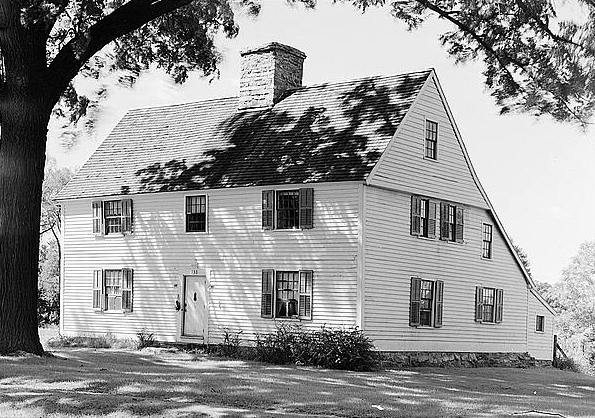
- Interactive map of the Comfort Starr House area

General information
- Type: House
- Architectural style: Saltbox
- Location: Guilford, Connecticut
- Completed: 1695
- Governing body: Private

Technical details
- Structural system: post-and-beam

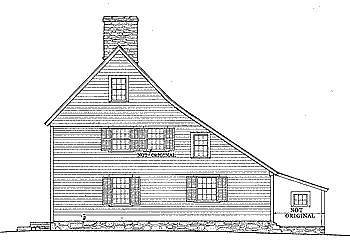
End elevation of Comfort Starr House illustrating the distinctive roof line

The Comfort Starr House, located at 138 State St., Guilford, Connecticut, is a classic saltbox house with an added lean-to. According to a dendrochronology study, completed in 2014, the house was built in 1695.

== About ==
The house derives its name from Comfort Starr (1666–1743), a tailor, who bought the house from the original builder, a Guilford signer (settler), Henry Kingsnorth, in 1694. The house is still in its primitive state. It is considered, by some, to be one of the oldest wooden timber frame houses still used as a private residence in the U.S. today.

Comfort Starr's grandfather, also named Comfort Starr, was an English physician who left Kent, Kingdom of England, on the ship Hercules in 1635 and settled in Cambridge, Colony of Massachusetts Bay.

== See also ==
- List of the oldest buildings in Connecticut
