= Dudleytown Historic District =

Historic district in Connecticut, United States

- U.S. National Register of Historic Places
- U.S. Historic district
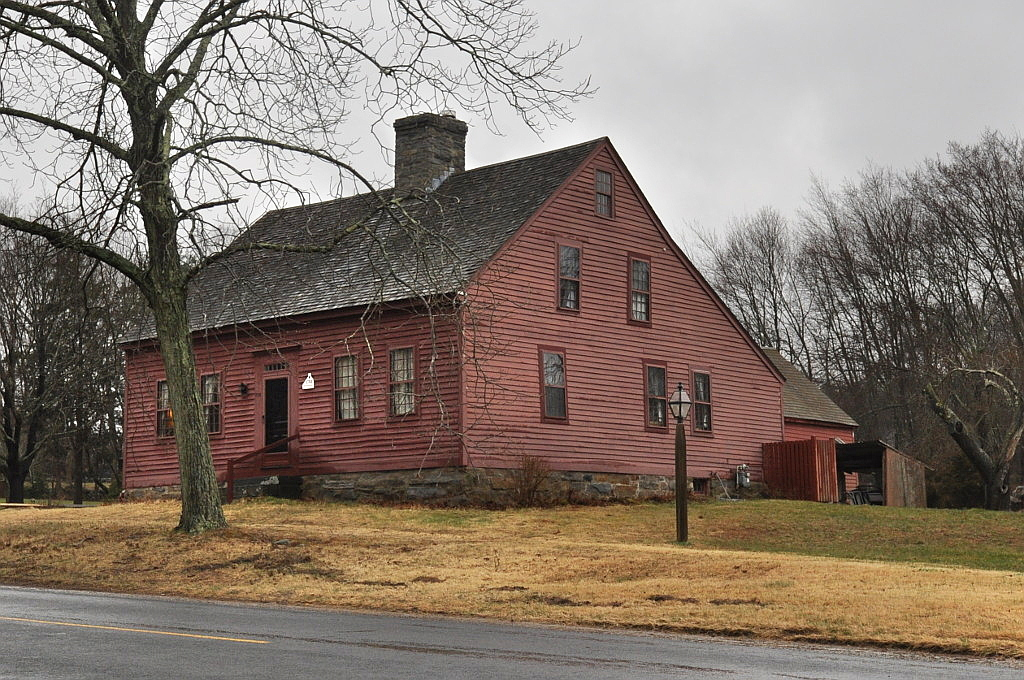

- Location within Connecticut Location within the United States
- Location: Roughly, Clapboard Hill Road from Tanner Marsh Road to Murray Lane, East River Road Southeast to Trailwood Drive, and Duck Hole Road, Guilford, Connecticut
- Coordinates: 41°17′58″N 72°39′29″W
- Area: 490 acres (200 ha)
- Architect: Bushnell, George
- Architectural style: Colonial Revival, Early Republic, Greek Revival
- NRHP reference No.: 91000951
- Added to NRHP: August 9, 1991

The Dudleytown Historic District, also known as Clapboard Hill, is a historic district in Guilford, Connecticut. Extending along Clapboard Hill Road for 1.4 miles (2.3 km), it encompasses a landscape whose land usage encapsulates all of the major regional rural development trends from the 17th to the early 20th centuries. It is architecturally dominated by rural vernacular residences of the 18th and 19th centuries. It was listed on the National Register of Historic Places in 1991.

== Description and history ==
The Dudleytown Historic District covers a rural landscape of 490 acres (200 ha), roughly bisected by the East River 1.5 miles (2.4 km) north of Guilford Center. The principal roadway through the district is Clapboard Hill Road, with properties also included as far north as Duck Hill Road and as far south as Tanner Marsh Road. Land usage is now predominantly either residential suburban or land conservation, although some agricultural uses continue. Most of the buildings in the district are residences, with a number of residential and agricultural outbuildings. The only major non-residential building is a district schoolhouse built in 1835. There is a fair amount (over 100 acres) of open marshland, some of which was historically used for grazing and growing salt hay. Artifacts such as stone walls, related to the control of tides during harvest time, are found in these areas.

This area was originally the property of William Dudley, one of the original English settlers of the town of Guilford in 1639. Dudley's descendants owned all of the land in the area until the 1860s, and continue to control much of its land. Its early uses were generally agricultural, although residents often engaged in other trades, such as blacksmithing or coopering. In the late 19th century, immigrants began to purchase some of the land, as branches of the Dudley family died out, mirroring a trend in other rural parts of Connecticut. In the 1930s, the Great Depression prompted further sales, which primarily went to wealthy city residents seeking summer country homes. In the mid-20th century the area became a suburban area connecting residents to city jobs via the Connecticut Turnpike. The district's architecture is reflective of all of these major trends.

== See also ==
- National Register of Historic Places listings in New Haven County, Connecticut
