= Sabbath Day House (Billerica, Massachusetts) =

Historic house in Massachusetts, United States

- U.S. National Register of Historic Places
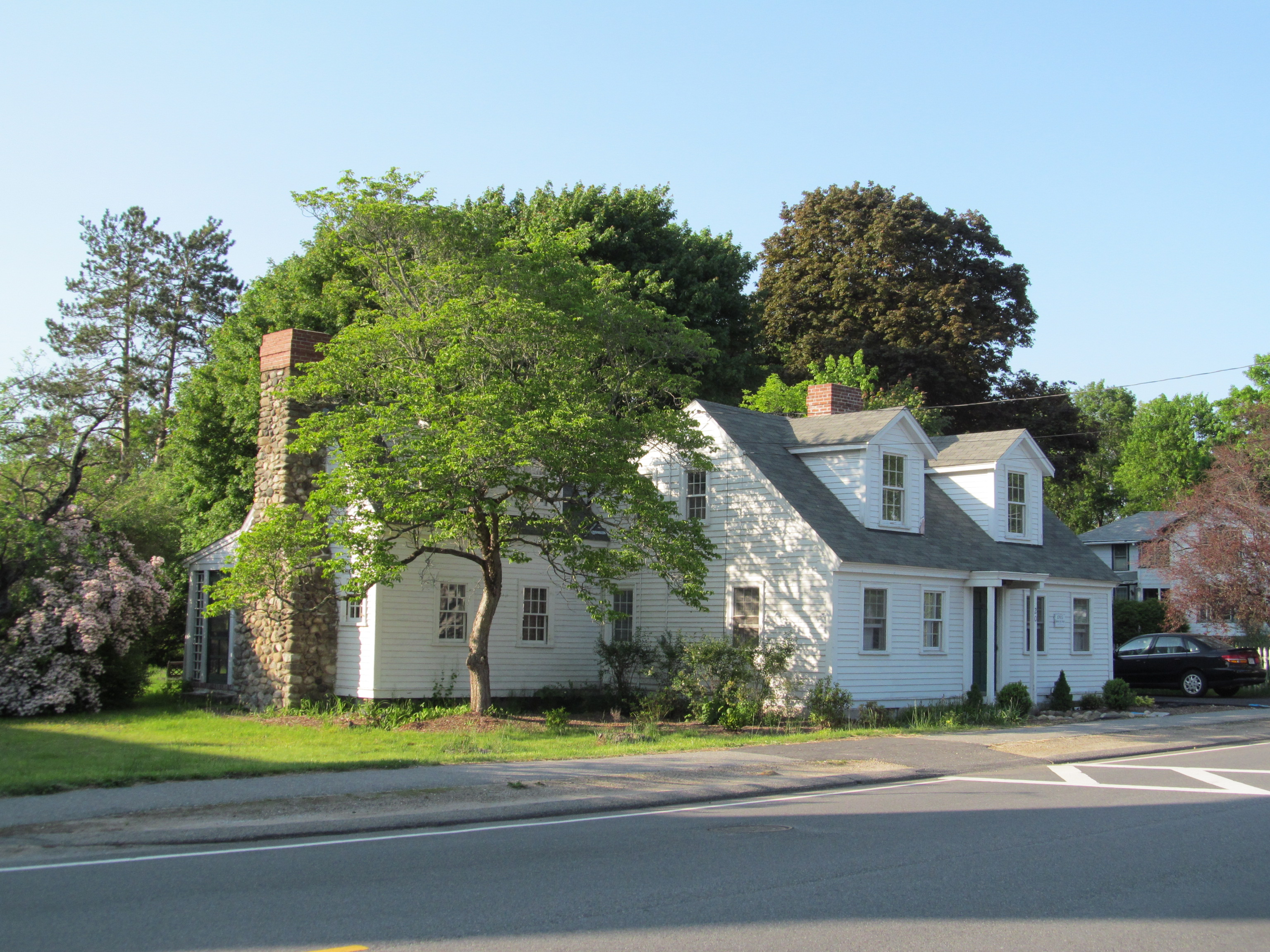
- Sabbath Day House

- Location within Massachusetts Location within the United States
- Location: 20 Andover Road, Billerica, Massachusetts
- Coordinates: 42°33′39″N 71°16′3″W
- Built: 1765
- Architectural style: Colonial
- NRHP reference No.: 73000285
- Added to NRHP: August 14, 1973

The Sabbath Day House is an historic house located in Billerica, Massachusetts. The main block of the 1.5-story wood-frame house was built in the mid-1760s to provide a place for parishioners to warm themselves in between the morning and afternoon services at the adjacent Congregational Church. The house was in that time maintained by a caretaker, and came into private ownership in 1818, when it was no longer needed for its original purpose.

On August 14, 1973, the house was added to the National Register of Historic Places.

== See also ==
- National Register of Historic Places listings in Middlesex County, Massachusetts
