= Guilford, Connecticut =

- Town
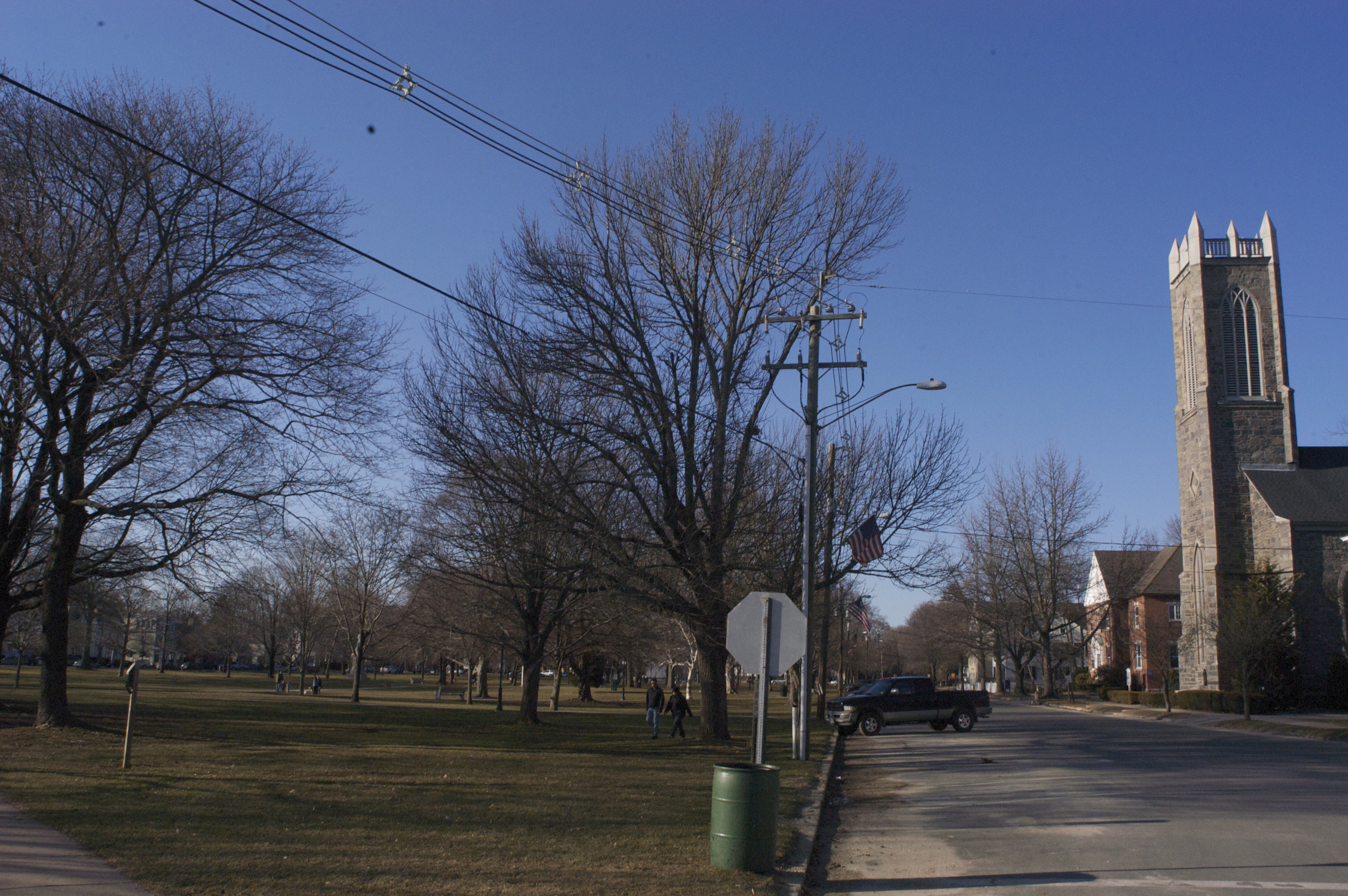
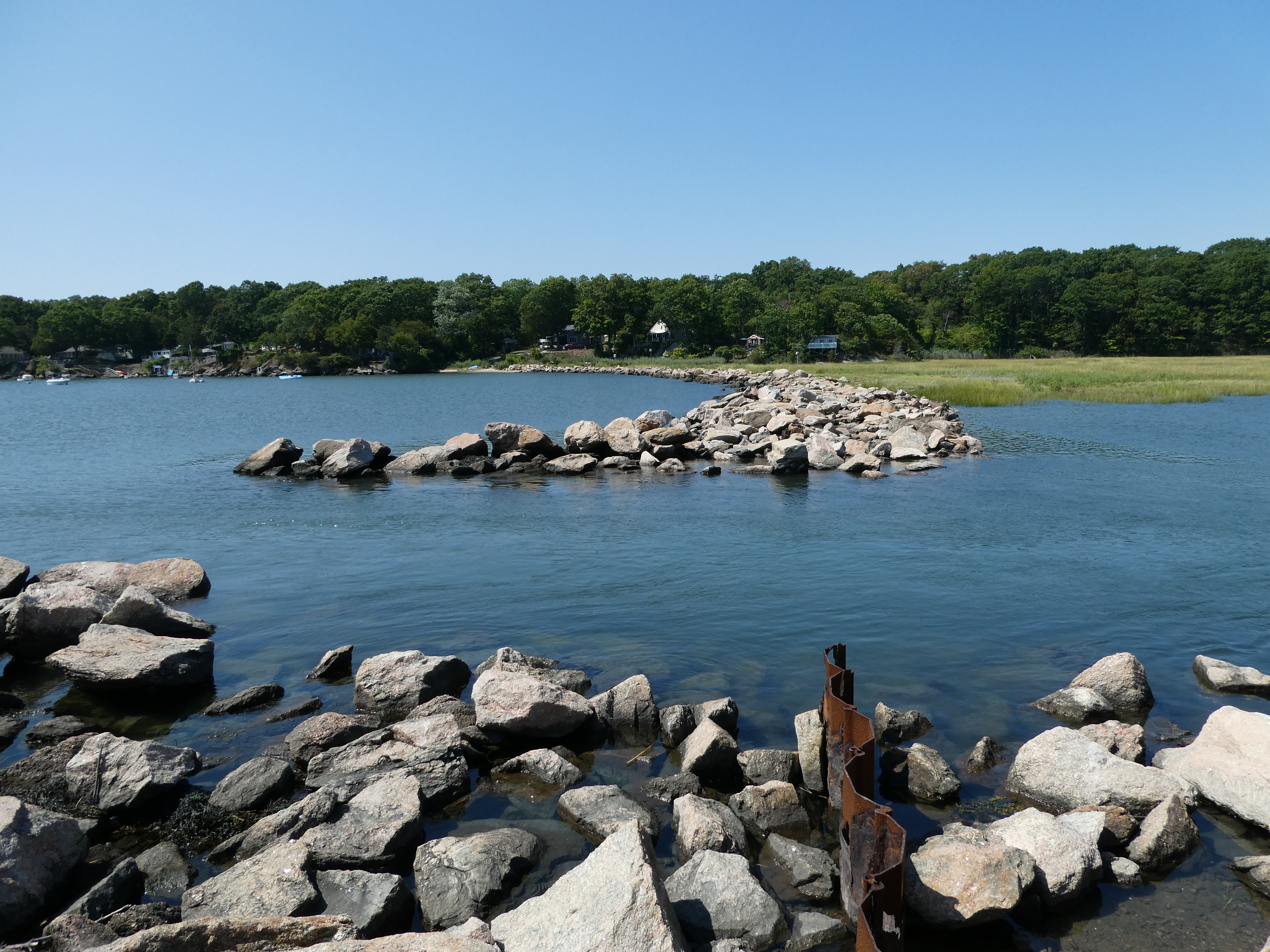
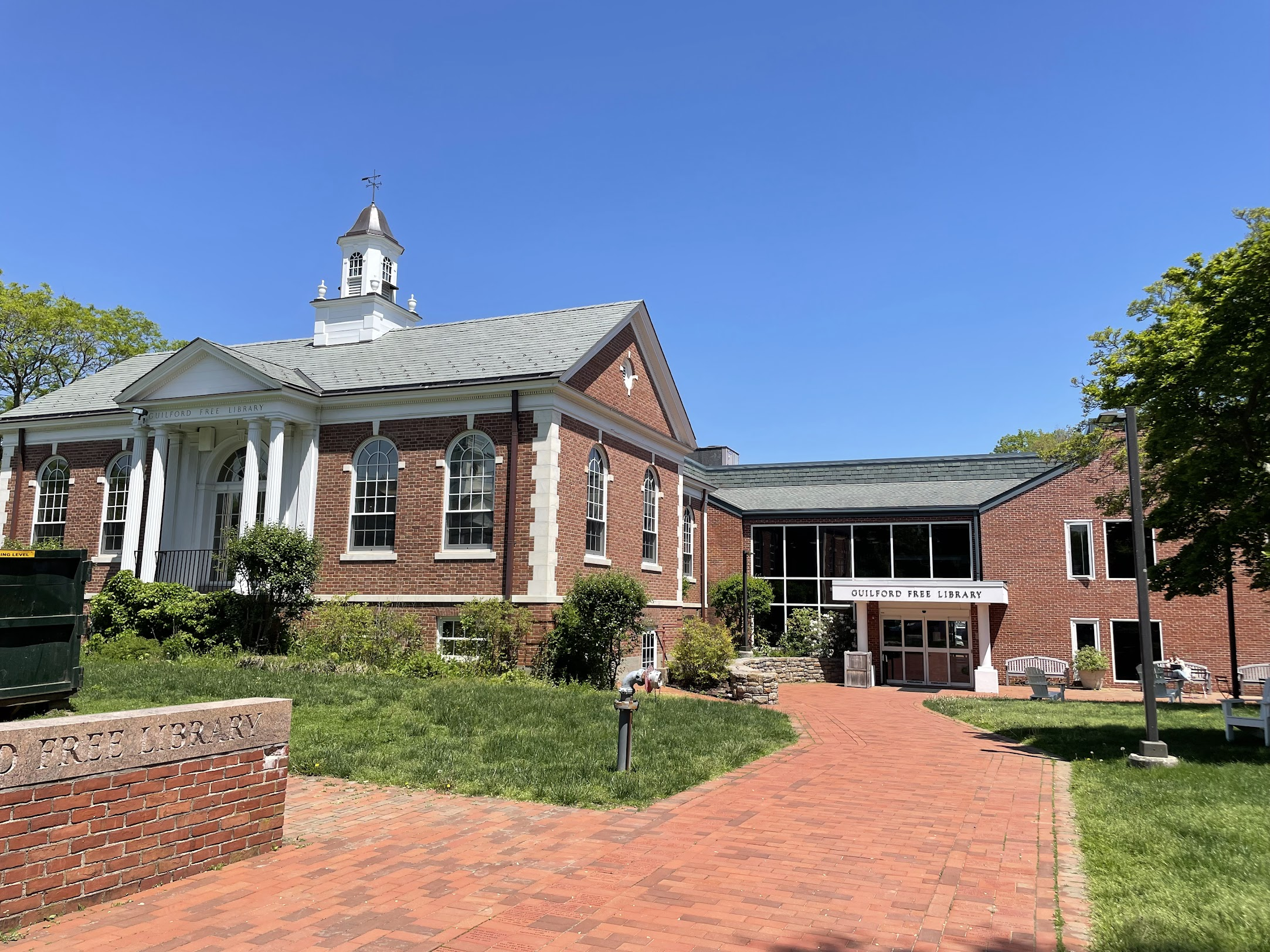
- Guilford Green Great Harbor causeway Guilford Free Library

- Seal
- Motto: "Discover A Piece Of Connecticut History"
- Interactive map of Guilford, Connecticut
- Coordinates: 41°17′N 72°41′W
- Country: United States
- U.S. state: Connecticut
- County: New Haven
- Region: South Central CT
- Settled: May 19, 1639
- Established: October 15, 1644
- Named for: Guildford, Surrey

Government
  - Type: Selectman-town meeting
  - First selectman: Matthew T. Hoey III (D)
  - Selectman: Louis Federici (D)
  - Selectman: Sandra Ruoff (D)
  - Selectman: Charles Havrda (R)
  - Selectman: Susan Renner (R)

Area
  - Total: 49.7 sq mi (128.7 km^{2})
  - Land: 47.1 sq mi (121.9 km^{2})
  - Water: 2.7 sq mi (6.9 km^{2})
- Elevation: 56 ft (17 m)

Population (2020)
  - Total: 22,073
  - Density: 469.0/sq mi (181.1/km^{2})
- Demonym: Guilfordite
- Time zone: UTC−5 (Eastern)
  - Summer (DST): UTC−4 (Eastern)
- ZIP Code: 06437
- Area codes: 203/475
- FIPS code: 09-34950
- GNIS feature ID: 0213438
- Website: www.guilfordct.gov

Guilford is a town in New Haven County, Connecticut, United States. It borders Madison, Branford, North Branford, and Durham. It is situated on I-95 and the Connecticut coast. The town is part of the South Central Connecticut Planning Region. The population was 22,264 at the July 2024 estimate made by the United States Census Bureau.

== History ==
Prior to European colonization, the area that became Guilford was the site of Menunkatuck, a Quinnipiac village. The Quinnipiac spoke Quiripi, one of the Eastern Algonquian branches of the Algonquian language family.

By 1614, the Dutch had surveyed, charted, and established New Netherland, a colonial province, with claimed territories from the Delmarva Peninsula to Cape Cod. This included claims over the Quinnipiac territory. However, a lack of any significant Dutch presence in the area gave English settlers an opportunity to settle in the Quinnipiac territory. Dutch claims over land that included Menunkatuck (and would later include Guilford) remained until the 1674 Treaty of Westminster that ended the Third Anglo-Dutch War.

In June 1637 during the Pequot War, a force of 100 English soldiers and Narragansett, Mohegan, and Montauk allies arrived from Long Island in pursuit of the Pequot grand sachem Sassacus near Menunkatuck. At a neck of land known today as Sachems Head, they captured and executed three Pequot sachems before continuing on west in pursuit of Sassacus.

In 1639, after landing in the plantation of Quinnipiaic (later known as New Haven) via ship from England, a group of 24 English Puritan families led by Rev. Henry Whitfield chose to settle almost 13 miles away near Menukatuck. During their voyage from England, the settlers drafted and signed the Plantation Covenant on June 1, 1639 (O.S.). The text of the covenant is memorialized by an engraved pink Stony Creek granite slab at the corner of Old Whitfield and Whitfield streets. On September 29, 1639 (O.S.), the colonists secured a land grant for their settlement from Shaumpishuh, the female sachem of Menunkatuck.

Guilford was admitted to New Haven Colony in 1643. In 1664, New Haven Colony, including Guilford, joined Connecticut Colony.

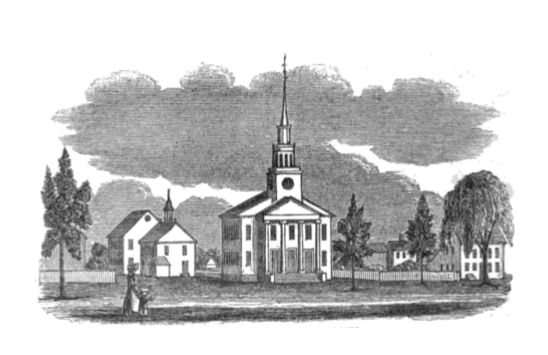
1838 view of Guilford from the Green showing (left to right) the Academy, the Congregational Church, and the Town House

The English settlement originally shared the name Menunkatuck with the Quinnipiac village. On July 6, 1643 (O.S.), records of the General Court session held at New Haven note that Menunkatuck changed its name to “Guilforde,” although no reason for the change was recorded. It is assumed that Guilford was named after the town of Guildford, England, the native home of a share of its first English settlers. In early maps of the Connecticut Colony, the town is seen on several maps as "Gilford."

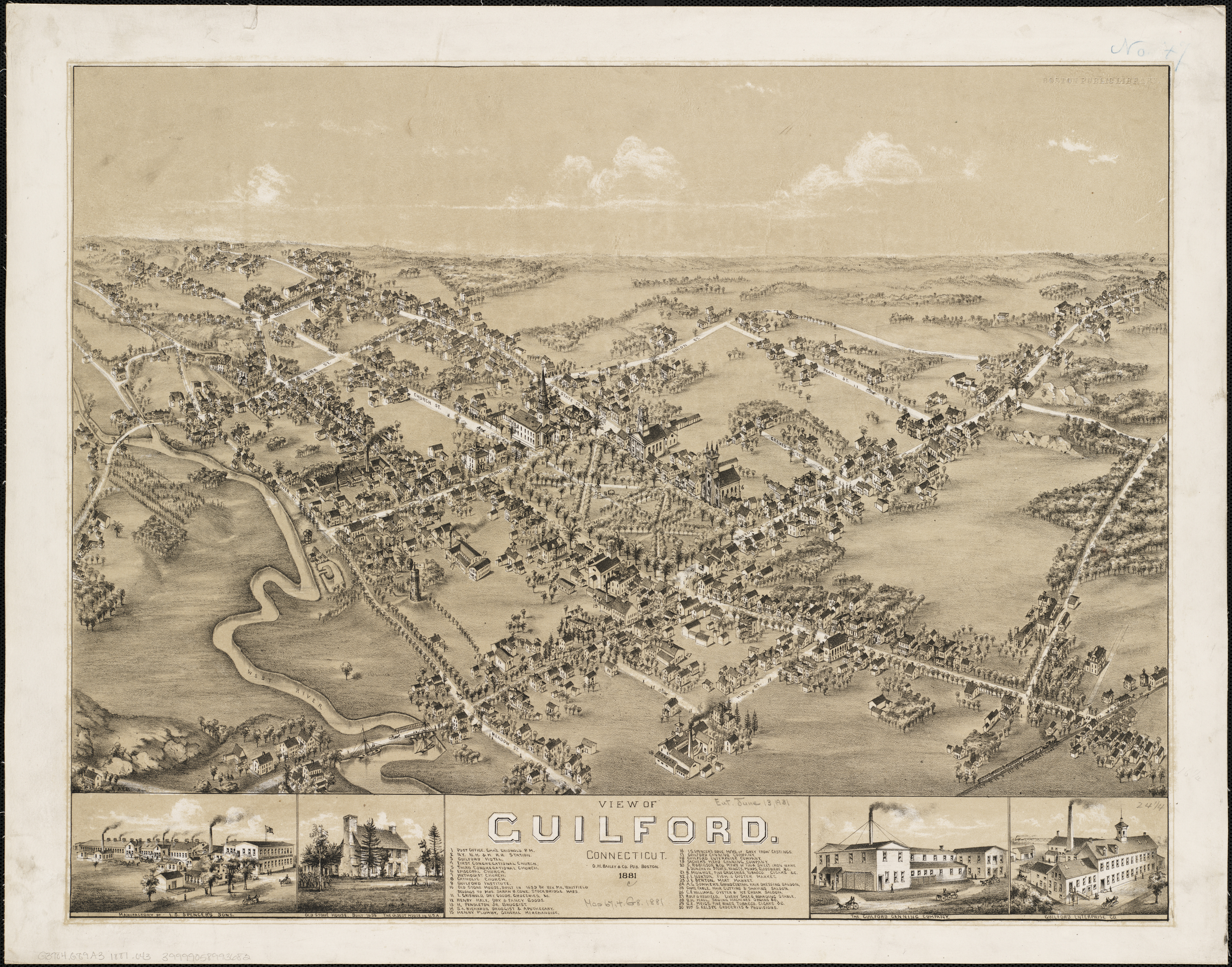
1881 bird's eye view of Guilford

Guilford is considered by some to have the third largest collection of historic homes in New England, with important buildings from the 17th, 18th, and 19th centuries. There are five historic house museums, including Dudley Farm and the Henry Whitfield House (1639), the oldest dwelling house in Connecticut and the oldest stone house built by English settlers in North America. The Comfort Starr House (1695) is one of the oldest wooden framed private dwellings in Connecticut, and one of the few houses remaining of the original signers who settled Guilford.

In June 1781, during the American Revolution, a skirmish was fought on Leete's Island between the Associated Loyalists and local militia under Captain Peter Vail.

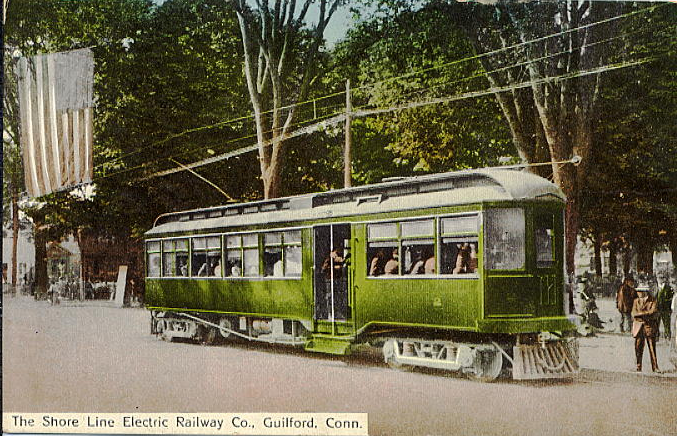
Guilford, c. 1900

== Geography ==
According to the United States Census Bureau, the town has a total area of 49.7 square miles (129 km^{2}), of which 47.0 square miles (122 km^{2}) is land and 2.7 square miles (6.9 km^{2} or 5.39%) is water.

The primary settlement in Guilford, known as Guilford Center, is located in the southern part of town around the intersection of U.S. Route 1 and Connecticut Route 77. It is served by three exits of Interstate 95, which passes just north of the town center. The Guilford Center census-designated place had a population of 2,597 at the 2010 census.

The northwest side of Guilford is flanked by the Metacomet Ridge, a mountainous trap rock ridgeline that stretches from Long Island Sound to nearly the Vermont border. Important features of the Metacomet ridge in Guilford include Totoket Mountain; its most notable peak, Bluff Head; and two eastern high points on the Totoket Mountain ridge named East Sugarloaf and West Sugarloaf. The 50-mile (80 km) Mattabesett Trail traverses Bluff Head; a shorter network of trails criss-cross the Sugarloaves. Guilford also contains the Westwoods Trail System which covers 39 miles (63 km) of trails on 1,200 acres (4.9 km^{2}) of land.

== Transportation ==
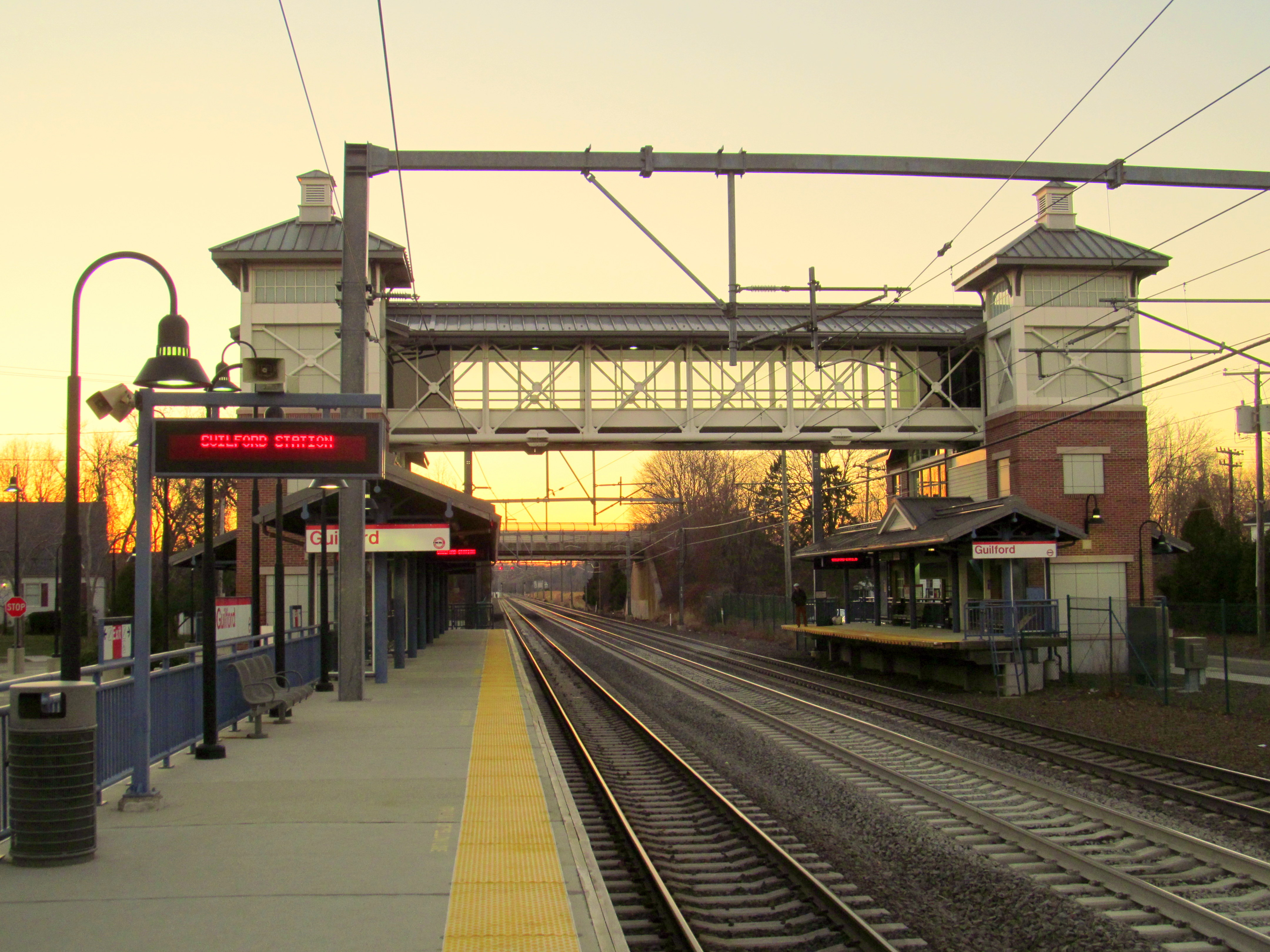
Guilford train station is served by Shore Line East

The Shore Line East train stops at Guilford station with service to Branford, East Haven, New Haven and New London, and the Connecticut Transit S bus travels between Guilford and New Haven several times each day.

=== Roads ===
I-95 runs through downtown Guilford where it has three interchanges. Exit 57 onto (Boston Post Road) US 1, exit 58 onto Church Street (Route 77), and exit 59 onto Goose Lane (connecting to US 1 and Route 146). Northbound it leads to Old Saybrook, New London, Providence, and Boston. Southbound it leads to New Haven, Bridgeport, Stamford, and New York City.

US 1, known locally as Boston Post Road, also runs through downtown Guilford, serving as the town's main commercial area. It connects to Interstate 95, Route 77, and Route 146. It follows a similar route to I-95, connecting to Boston to the North and New York City to the South.

Route 77 is the main route between downtown Guilford and the neighboring town of Durham. It begins at the town green at a junction with Route 146. From there it heads North through the town crossing US 1, Interstate 95, and Route 80. From there it passes through North Guilford and into Durham, ending just South of the Durham town center at a junction with Route 17.

Route 146 is a scenic coastal road connecting downtown Guilford to the neighboring town of Branford. It begins on the East side of town at a junction with US 1. From there it passes along the South side of the town green where it connects to the Southern terminus of Route 77. It continues along the coast, through the neighborhood of Sachem's Head and into Branford.

Route 80 cuts across the town, forming the dividing line between North and South Guilford. To the West it connects to New Haven, Foxon, and North Branford. In Guilford it has a junction with Route 77. To the East it passes through Madison, connecting to Killingworth and Deep River.

== Principal communities ==
- Guilford Center (Guilford Green)
- Leete's Island
- North Guilford
- Nut Plains
- Shell Beach
- Sachem's Head

Other minor communities and geographic features in Guilford are Guilford Lakes, Indian Cove, and Old Quarry.

== Demographics ==
Historical population
Census	Pop.	Note	%±
1820	4,131		—
1850	2,653		—
1860	2,624		−1.1%
1870	2,576		−1.8%
1880	2,782		8.0%
1890	2,780		−0.1%
1900	2,785		0.2%
1910	3,001		7.8%
1920	2,803		−6.6%
1930	3,117		11.2%
1940	3,544		13.7%
1950	5,092		43.7%
1960	7,913		55.4%
1970	12,033		52.1%
1980	17,375		44.4%
1990	19,848		14.2%
2000	21,398		7.8%
2010	22,375		4.6%
2020	22,073		−1.3%
U.S. Decennial Census

As of the census of 2000, there were 21,398 people, 8,151 households, and 6,039 families residing in the town. The population density was 454.8 inhabitants per square mile (175.6/km^{2}). There were 8,724 housing units at an average density of 185.4 per square mile (71.6/km^{2}). The racial makeup of the town was 96.04% White, 0.93% African American, 0.05% Native American, 1.65% Asian, 0.41% from other races, and 0.93% from two or more races. Hispanic or Latino of any race were 2.13% of the population.

There were 8,151 households, out of which 35.6% had children under the age of 18 living with them, 64.4% were married couples living together, 7.2% had a female householder with no husband present, and 25.9% were non-families. Of all households 21.6% were made up of individuals, and 8.6% had someone living alone who was 65 years of age or older. The average household size was 2.59 and the average family size was 3.04.

In the town, the population was spread out, with 25.4% under the age of 18, 4.4% from 18 to 24, 26.2% from 25 to 44, 31.2% from 45 to 64, and 12.8% who were 65 years of age or older. The median age was 42 years. For every 100 females, there were 92.8 males. For every 100 females age 18 and over, there were 89.5 males.

The median income for a household in the town was $76,843, and the median income for a family was $87,045 (these figures had risen to $90,026 and $104,852 respectively as of a 2007 estimate). Males had a median income of $60,623 versus $40,307 for females. The per capita income for the town was $37,161. About 2.3% of families and 3.1% of the population were below the poverty line, including 3.4% of those under age 18 and 3.8% of those age 65 or over.

== Government ==
Voter registration and party enrollment as of October 31, 2024
Party	Active voters	Inactive voters	Total voters	Percentage	Change from 2014
Democratic	6,383	410	6,793	37.67%	+4.8%
Republican	3,501	219	3,720	20.63%	-1.32%
Minor parties	397	26	423	2.35%	+1.73%
Unaffiliated	6,580	516	7,096	39.35%	-5.03%
Total	16,861	1,171	18,032	100%	

In the 2008 presidential election, Democrat Barack Obama received 61.02% of the town vote, against 38.06% for Republican John McCain. In 2016, Democrat Hillary Clinton carried the town with 59.2% over Republican Donald Trump with 37.1%. Joe Biden won the town with 64.68% of the vote in 2020 and Kamala Harris won with 64.40% in 2024. George H. W. Bush was the last Republican to win Guilford, receiving 55.87% of the vote in 1988.

== Economy ==
American Cruise Lines has its headquarters in Guilford. There are many small businesses throughout the town, including the shops on the Guilford Green.

== Education ==
=== Public schools ===
Guilford is served by the Guilford Public Schools district, which provides comprehensive education from kindergarten through high school. The district comprises four elementary schools, two middle schools, and a high school, offering a range of academic and extracurricular programs.

- Elementary schools: Guilford has four elementary schools: Calvin Leete Elementary School, A.W. Cox Elementary School, Melissa Jones Elementary School, and Guilford Lakes Elementary School.
- Middle schools: Baldwin Middle School serves students in grades five through six. Adams Middle School serves students in grades seven through eight.
- High school: Guilford High School, serving grades nine through twelve, offers a wide array of academic courses, including Advanced Placement (AP) and International Baccalaureate (IB) classes, and college preparatory programs.

=== Public library ===
The Guilford Free Library is a resource for the community, providing access to a vast collection of books, digital media, historical materials about Guilford's history and genealogy, and educational programs for all ages. The library hosts numerous events, workshops, and activities aimed at promoting literacy and lifelong learning.

== Parks and recreation areas ==
=== Town ===
The following parks are owned and operated by the town government:

- Bittner Park: 136 acres including a playground, a lighted softball field (Cash Mitchell Field), baseball and soccer fields, basketball and pickleball courts, hiking/horseback riding/cross country skiing trails, a skate park, public bathrooms, and a disc golf course
- Braemore Preserve: 95 acres with 8 miles of hiking trails, including a section of the Lone Pine Trail which connects it to Bluff Head and Northwoods and the James Valley Preserve
- Chaffinch Island Park: 22 acre park at the mouth of the West River with picnic tables, grills, and fishing access
- Chittenden Park: Softball and soccer fields, bocce courts, picnicking, and a boardwalk to Long Island Sound. This park is the southern terminus of the New England National Scenic Trail
- Daniel Avenue Beach: 3/4 acre unsupervised beach providing access to Indian Cove on Long Island Sound. Shellfishing is allowed by permit
- East River Preserve: 583 acres with 7.6 miles of hiking trails along the East River
- Grass Island: 30 acre park including the Grass Island Shack (a local landmark). There are no formal trails. It is accessible by road from Madison or by crossing the East River by boat from the Town Marina.
- Guilford Lakes Golf Course (9 holes)
- Guilford Marina: Small boat marina. Boat ramp and fishing access
- Jacobs Beach: 25 acre park on Long Island Sound, with a supervised beach, playground, splash pad, picnic area, pavilions, kayak racks, volleyball courts, half basketball court, and bathhouse
- James Valley Preserve: 75 acres with hiking trails (including a section of the Lone Pine Trail) that adjoins the Bluff Head and Northwoods property maintained by the land trust
- Lake Quonnipaug: Allowing access to the largest lake in Guilford, this property includes a 41-acre park with bathrooms, picnic tables, a pavilion, and a supervised beach. The lake is open for swimming, paddling, and fishing.
- Long Hill Park: 10 acre park with playing fields for baseball, football, soccer/lacrosse and field hockey
- Mill Pond: 1 acre park with picnic area and fishing access. Ice skating in the winter
- Nut Plains Park: 23 acres including a dog park, lacrosse fields, and a short trail
- Rollwood Park: 1 acre park with a picnic area, located across the street from the Henry Whitfield House. It includes the foundations and chimney of a house once belonging to Rollin S. Woodruff, the 62nd Governor of Connecticut
- Shell Beach: 1 acre unsupervised beach providing access to Long Island Sound. Shellfishing is allowed by permit
- Timberlands Preserve: 600 acres with 15 miles of trails featuring the Iron Stream, Upper Guilford Lake, and a section of the New England Trail
- Trolley Road: Small unsupervised beach, providing access to Long Island Sound. Shellfishing is available by permit
- Town Green: 7.7 acres in the town's historic district, surrounded by shops, churches, the town hall, and the Nathanael B. Greene Community Center (which has meeting rooms and event spaces)

=== Land Trust ===
The Guilford Land Conservation Trust (GLCT) manages the following properties for public use:

- Big Maple: 31 acres, 1.1 miles of trails, Chestnut Creek, and what may be one of the largest sugar maples in Connecticut
- Bluff Head and Northwoods: 870 acres with 14 miles of hiking trails, including a section of the New England Trail, a section of the Lone Pine Trail, Hemlock Brook, Myerhuber Pond, the Broomstick Ledges, and Bluff Head (the highest point of Totoket Mountain). This property adjoins James Valley Preserve, which is owned and managed by the Town of Guilford
- County Road Fields: 25 acres, no formal trails
- Dudley Barrows Woods: 120 acres with hiking trails and scenic vistas
- East River Woodlands: 106 acres with hiking trails near the East River
- Eastwoods: 95 acres with hiking trails (including a section of the New England Trail), adjoining East River Preserve (owned and managed by the Town of Guilford) as well as another GLCT property (Nut Plains Woods)
- Jared Eliot Preserve: 36 acres of farmland once owned by Jared Eliot, now features a short hiking trail along the West River
- Kampmeyer Preserve: 100 acres with hiking trails featuring Notch Hill Brook and the surrounding wetlands
- Meeting House Hill Preserve: 25 acres located across from the Meeting House Hill Historic District. This property is maintained for pollinators and field nesting birds and has no formal trails
- Munger Brook Preserve: 21 acres featuring a short hiking trail and the headwaters of Munger Brook
- Neck River North: A small preserve with a trail that provides access to Cockaponset State Forest in Madison as well as land owned by the Madison Land Trust
- Nut Plains Woods: 57 acres with hiking trails (including a section of the New England Trail), adjoining East River Preserve (owned and managed by the Town of Guilford) as well as another GLCT property (Eastwoods)
- Olmsted Outlook: A half acre park on the banks of the West River, close to the town center. It includes a historic sea wall, a lawn, flower beds, and a view of the West River and the surrounding Marshlands (which are also protected by the GLCT). The property is named for architect Frederick Law Olmsted, who visited Guilford in the 1830s, and may have taken some inspiration from the view over the West River when designing his later projects.
- Priscilla Otte Preserve: 32 acres with hiking trails, a stream, a cave, and a historic barn
- Spencer Creek Preserve: 11.5 acres with hiking trails and views of Spencer Creek and the West River
- Tanner Marsh Brook: 5 acres along the banks of the Tanner Marsh Brook, following its course from Tanner Marsh Road to the East River
- Westwoods: The largest trail system in Guilford with over 32 miles of hiking trails featuring caves, waterfalls, marshes, and Lost Lake. The property is connected to parts of Cockaponset State Forest

=== State forest ===
There are two parcels of Cockaponset State Forest in Guilford. One, just north of Route 80 contains a section of the New England Trail and connects to the town owned Timberlands Preserve to the south of Route 80. The other parcel adjoins several Land Trust properties, collectively making up Westwoods.

=== Other ===
There are three outdoor recreation areas in Guilford that are owned by other organizations and are open to the public:

- Genesee Recreation Area: Owned by the South Central Connecticut Regional Water Authority, this area is accessible by permit and contains around 12 miles of trails, including a section of the New England Trail. It also contains several foundations and stone walls that are the remnants of the Little Genesee Settlement, active between 1770 and 1875
- Salt Meadows Sanctuary: 111 acres with a 1 mile long trail, maintained by the Connecticut Audubon Society
- Sugarloaf Recreation Area: Owned by the South Central Connecticut Regional Water Authority, this area is accessible by permit and contains about 4.5 miles of trails

== Notable locations ==
Guilford, Connecticut is noted for its rolling farmland, its avoidance of the density and sprawl that has occurred from land use regulations of its neighboring communities, and its numerous historic homes and sites.

- Bishop's Orchards
- Rothberg Institute For Childhood Diseases
- Westwoods Trails: conservation area managed by the Guilford Land Conservation Trust

=== Historic structures and districts ===
In 1981, the Guilford Preservation Alliance identified 450 buildings deemed architecturally significant, ranging from the 17th to 20th centuries.

Building	Image	First built	National Register of Historic Places listed	Current use	Notes
Henry Whitfield House		1639	Yes	House museum	Oldest house in Connecticut and the oldest stone house in New England.
Acadian House		1670	Yes	Residential	One of Connecticut's oldest surviving houses. Notable for its later occupation by refugee Acadians following their 1755 deportation from Nova Scotia.
Elisha Pitkin House		1690	Yes	Residential	Moved to Guilford from East Hartford in 1955
Comfort Starr House		1695	No	Residential	Classic New England saltbox home.
Pelatiah Leete House		1710	Yes	Residential	Oldest surviving house associated with the locally prominent Leete family, who were among the founders of New Haven Colony.
Hyland House		1713	Yes	House museum	Open to the public as a museum since 1918.
Jared Eliot House		1723	Yes	Residential	Well-preserved example of period residential architecture
Thomas Burgis II House		1735	Yes	Residential	One of Guilford's finest and best-documented colonial-era houses
Sabbathday House		1735	Yes	Residential	One of two Sabbathday houses to survive in the town. Built for the purpose of sheltering church-going families between morning and afternoon services.
Griswold House		1764	Yes	House museum	Museum includes the saltbox house, a historic blacksmith shop, a barn with farm tools and implements, two corn cribs and a Victorian era three seat outhouse.
Falkner Island Light		1802	Yes	Lighthouse	Second-oldest extant lighthouse in Connecticut. Commissioned by Thomas Jefferson.
Medad Stone Tavern		1803	Yes	House museum	Example of early 19th-century Federal period architecture. Never used as a tavern.
First Congregational Church		1830	No	Church	Third church building for a congregation founded in 1643.

Historic districts include:

- Guilford Historic Town Center
- Dudleytown Historic District
- Meeting House Hill Historic District (North Guilford)
- Route 146 Historic District (Branford and Guilford)

=== Other notable structures ===
Building	Image	Built	Current use	Notes
Junior Olsen House		1951	Residential	Modernist home by sculptor and architectural designer Tony Smith. Old Quarry neighborhood.
Fred Olsen, Sr. House		1953	Residential	Modernist residential compound by sculptor and architectural designer Tony Smith. Old Quarry neighborhood.
"The spaceship"		1987	Condos	Unique condo building designed by architect Wilfred J. O. Armster.

== Notable people ==
- Wilfred J. O. Armster. (1938–2019), architect
- Humbert Allen Astredo (1929–2016), American stage, film, and television actor best known for the numerous roles he performed on the daytime Gothic horror soap opera Dark Shadows, most notably that of the warlock Nicholas Blair
- Abraham Baldwin (1754–1807), minister, patriot, politician, and founding father
- Robert Elliott De Forest (1845–1924), Democratic member of the United States House of Representatives, mayor of Bridgeport, Connecticut, member of the Connecticut Senate and Connecticut House of Representatives, born in Guilford
- Ronald Duman (1954–2020), neuroscientist died in Guilford
- Moses Gunn (1929–1993), American actor, resided in Guilford since the 1970s
- Fitz-Greene Halleck (1790–1867), American poet and author
- Samuel Johnson (1696–1772), American colonial intellectual and educator; first president of King's College (now Columbia University)
- Samuel Johnson Jun'r (1757–1836), schoolmaster and teacher of Fitz-Greene Halleck; as the compiler of A School Dictionary (1798), the first American lexicographer
- Edward Ruggles Landon (1813–1883), Connecticut politician and judge
- Edward Merwin Lee (1835–1913), attorney and Brevet Brigadier General in the Union Army during the Civil War
- William Leete (c. 1612–1683), Guilford town clerk, justice of the peace, Governor of the New Haven Colony (1661–1665), and Governor of the Colony of Connecticut (1676–1683)
- Leonard C. Lewin (1916–1999), author of The Report from Iron Mountain
- Frank Modell (1917–2016), cartoonist, died in Guilford
- Aldo Parisot (1918–2018), Brazilian-born American cellist and cello teacher
- Lavinia Stoddard (1787–1820), poet, school founder
- Shaumpishuh (d. 1686), sachem of Menunkatuck
- Henry Whitfield (c.1590-c.1657), Guilford founder and Puritan minister

=== Living ===
- Jeffrey Ambroziak, cartographer, inventor, and attorney
- Jamie Arentzen (b. 1970), American guitarist, musician; member of various rock bands including Sky Heroes, American Hi-Fi, Dream Club
- Will Aronson, Tony Award winning composer and writer for musical theatre
- Nick Benas (b. 1979) – United States Marine Corps veteran, author, martial arts instructor; author of bestselling books on resilience, stoicism and leadership. Raised in Guilford, Connecticut.
- Thom Brooks, political and legal philosopher
- Benjamin Chan, American scientist at Yale University
- Mickey Curry, Drummer for Bryan Adams
- David DeMille, physicist and Professor of Physics at University of Chicago.
- Joe Flood, musician and songwriter
- Nick Fradiani (b. 1985), American Idol season 14 winner, born in Guilford
- Adam Greenberg (b.1981), Major League Baseball player
- Peter Halley (b. 1953), American artist
- Timothy Mellon, heir
- Becki Newton, actress in Ugly Betty and How I Met Your Mother, grew up in Guilford and is a Guilford High School Alumna
- David Allen Sibley, ornithologist, author, and illustrator
- Jennifer Westfeldt, actress and screenwriter known for Kissing Jessica Stein, born in Guilford
- Carl Zimmer, science writer
