= Rothberg Institute for Childhood Diseases =

Non-profit organization

- Formation: 2002
- Founder: Jonathan Rothberg
- Type: 501(c)(3)
- Headquarters: Guilford, Connecticut
- Website: http://www.childhooddiseases.org/

The Rothberg Institute For Childhood Diseases is a non-profit organization dedicated to finding a cure for rare childhood diseases such as Tuberous Sclerosis Complex (TSC). The organization was founded by Jonathan Rothberg and his wife in 2002 after their son was born with TSC.

Located in Guilford, Connecticut, the organization was responsible for the CommunityTSC distributed computing project.

Dr. Rothberg graduated from Yale University in 1991.

== CommunityTSC ==
CommunityTSC Drug Design Optimization Lab (D2OL) was a distributed computing project developed by the Institute to test drug candidates interaction with a target molecule that is essential to the spread of the disease under scrutiny. By evaluating the energy level released by binding a small molecule drug candidate to the surface of a larger Target molecule (D2OL) determines the fitness of the particular candidate to a region of the Target structure known as the Active Site. This process is referred to as docking the drug candidate to the target. D2OL ended on April 15, 2009.
