= Sabbathday House (Guilford, Connecticut) =

Historic house in Connecticut, United States

- U.S. National Register of Historic Places
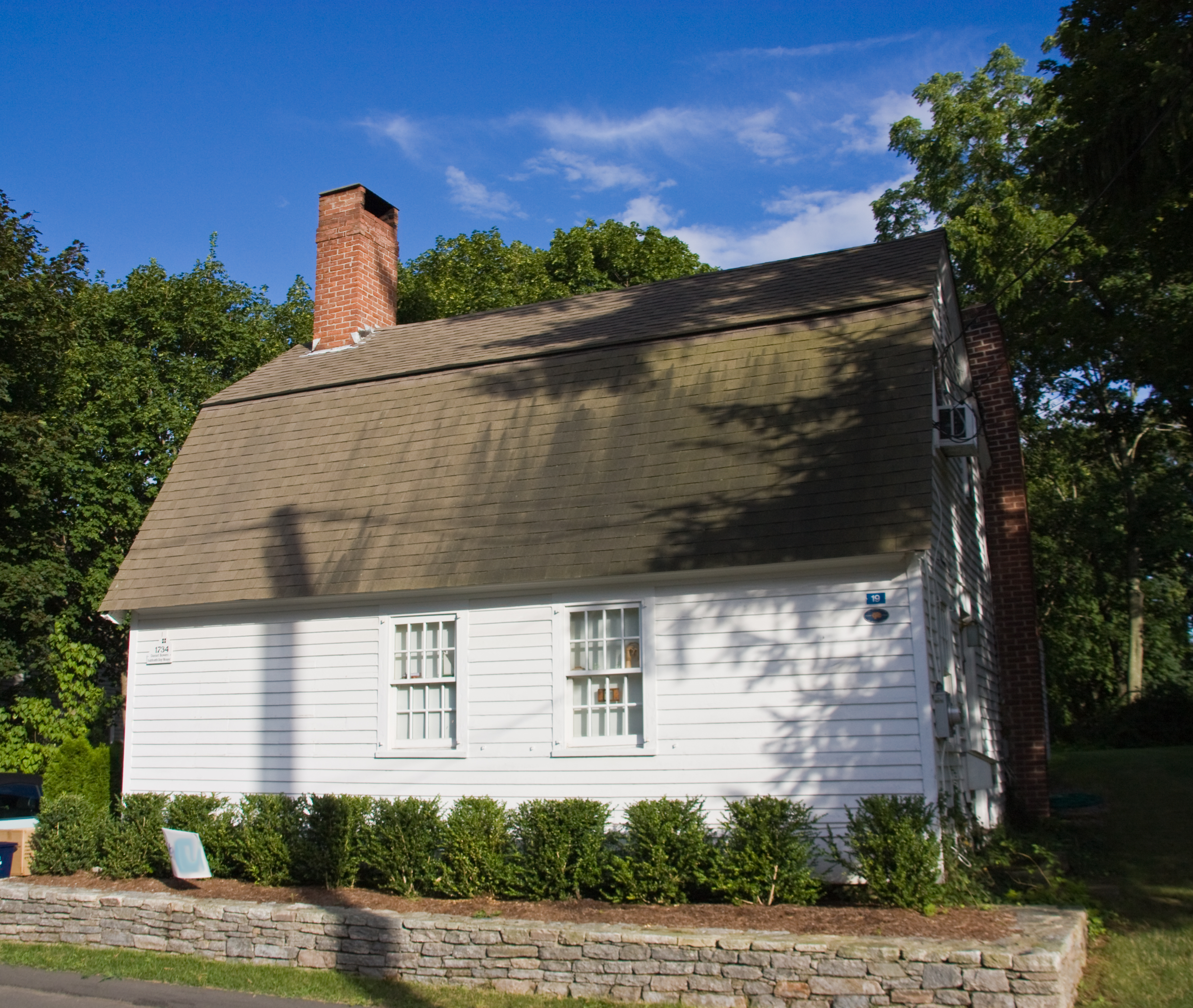

- Location within Connecticut Location within the United States
- Location: 19 Union Street, Guilford, Connecticut
- Coordinates: 41°17′07″N 72°40′50″W
- Area: less than one acre
- Built: 1735
- NRHP reference No.: 75001931
- Added to NRHP: October 10, 1975

The Sabbathday House, also known as the Daniel Bowen House, is a historic house at 19 Union Street in Guilford, Connecticut. Built about 1735, it is one two surviving houses in the town built for the purpose of sheltering church-going families between morning and afternoon services. The house was listed on the National Register of Historic Places in 1975.

== Description and history ==
The Sabbathday House is located in a residential setting a short way northeast of Guilford's town green, on the south side of Union Street between State Street and Market Place. Set close to the street, it is a 1 1/2-story wood-frame structure, finished in wooden clapboards and covered by a roof that is gambreled in the front and a shed roof in the rear. The front facade is relatively plain, with a pair of sash windows irregularly placed. The main entrance is on the right side, framed by simple moulding with a cornice above. A brick chimney rises at the peak of the roof on the left side, with a second chimney on the right side, set further back. An ell extends to the rear.

In colonial Guilford as in other communities, churchgoers attended both morning and afternoon services on Sundays. Families that traveled long distances to attend needed a place to rest in between these services. The town allocated several parcels in near the church for this purpose, and as many as thirty small houses were built for this purpose. This one was probably built in 1735 by Daniel Bowen, and is one of two Sabbathday houses to survive in the town.

== See also ==
- National Register of Historic Places listings in New Haven County, Connecticut
