= Saltbox house =

Building with a long, pitched roof that slopes down to the back

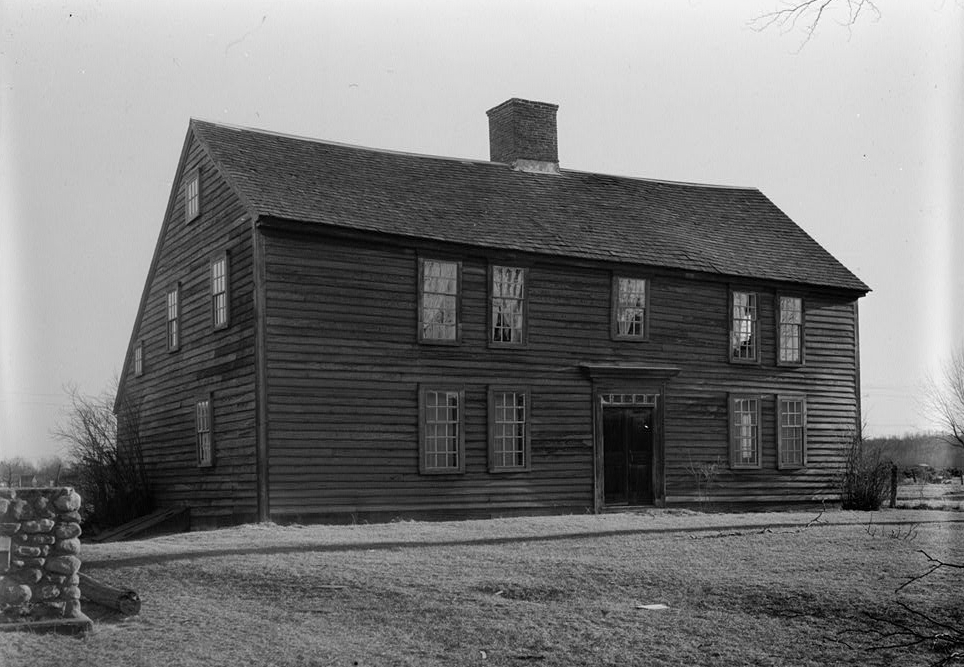
Thomas Lee House, East Lyme, Connecticut, c. 1660-1664

A saltbox house is a gable-roofed residential structure that is typically two stories in the front and one in the rear, so that the front roof is considerably shorter than the back one. It is a traditional New England-style of home, originally timber-framed, which takes its name from its resemblance to a type of slant-topped lidded wooden box in which salt was once kept.

The structure's unequal sides and long, low rear roofline are its most distinctive features. A flat front and central chimney are also recognizable traits.

== Origins ==
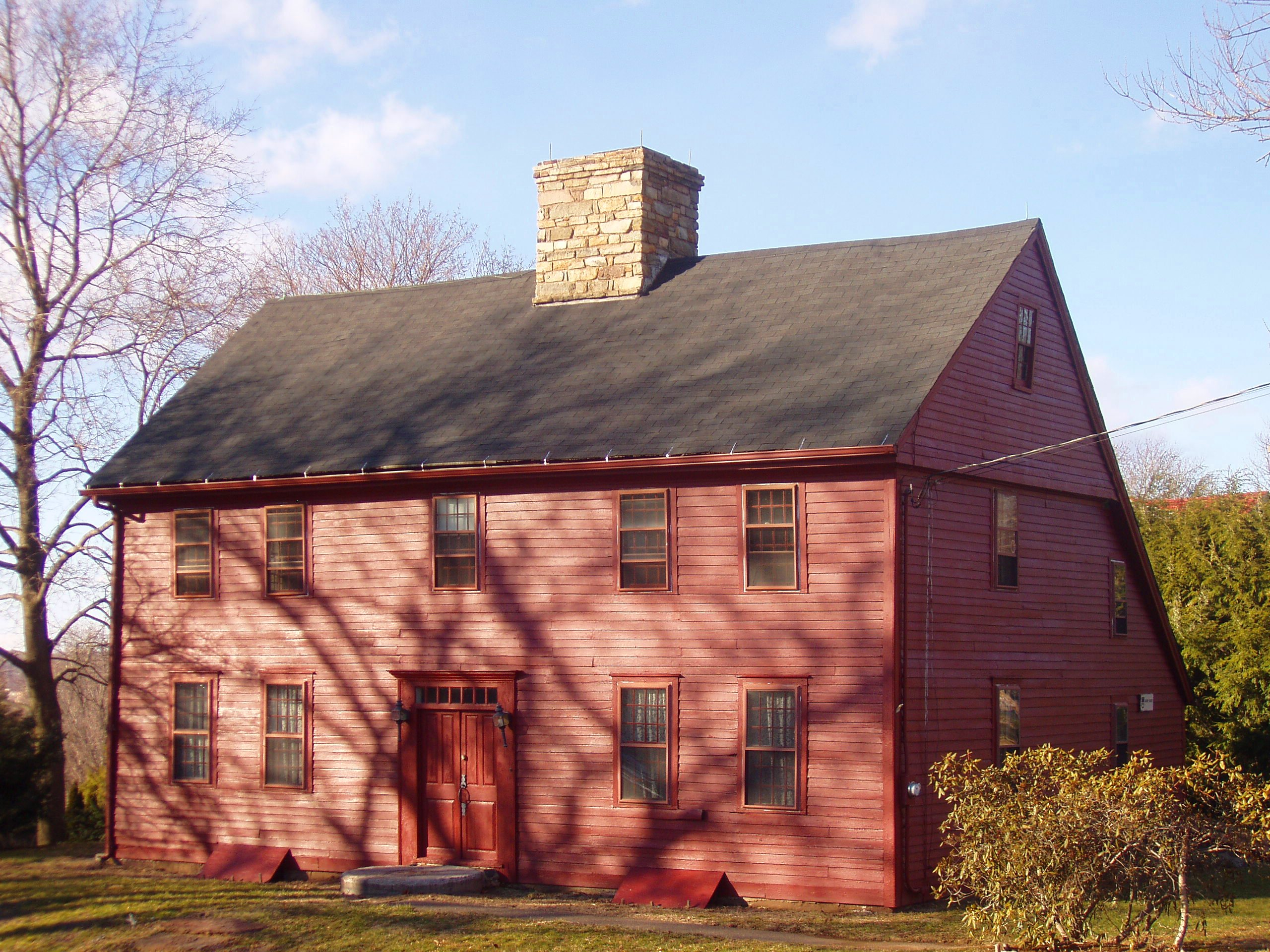
Nehemiah Royce House, Wallingford, Connecticut, c. 1672

The saltbox is an example of American colonial architecture, although it probably originated in Kent and East Anglia in the United Kingdom, coming across with the first wave of Puritans. Its shape evolved organically as an economical way to enlarge a house by adding a shed to a home's rear.

Original hand-riven oak clapboards are still in place on some of the earliest New England saltboxes, such as the Comfort Starr House and Ephraim Hawley House. Once part of their exteriors, they are preserved in place in attics that were created when shed-roofed additions were added onto the homes.

The style was popular for structures throughout the colonial period and into the early Republic for its ability to enlarge the footprint of an existing structure at a minimum of cost. It was most common in Massachusetts, the Connecticut Valley, and in the Western Reserve of Ohio in the period from 1620 to mid 1700s, but continued to be built until around 1820.

Saltbox homes can also be found in parts of Newfoundland and Labrador as well as in parts of Michigan's Keweenaw Peninsula.

== Catslide ==
The roof style is also known as a catslide roof – any roof that, in part, extends down below the main eave height, providing greater area under the roof. If the roof continues at the same pitch, it is considered a "continuous catslide". In the United States, the term is applied to roofs on houses in the Southeast, especially stretching from Maryland south and west through Kentucky, and from early colonial times to around 1910. The term was borrowed from 17th century England where it referred to a secondary roof, often at the side of a building. In the southern US, a catslide roof was usually covering a front or rear porch, often with a less steep pitch than the main roof.

The term is applied to any roof with different eave heights, such as a house with one and a half stories above ground in the front and one story in the rear. The catslide could cover an open patio with a lower ceiling than the house, or could continue almost to the ground, creating a limited height storage area. A front vestibule could have a small catslide roof perpendicular to the main roof. A dormer could be designed with a catslide.

== Construction ==
Characteristic of most early New England colonial houses, early saltboxes were timber framed. Also known as post-and-beam construction, the technique joins large pieces of wood with mortise and tenon joints, wooden pegs, braces, or trusses. Metal nails were sparingly used, as they were an expensive commodity at the time. The exterior of a saltbox was often finished with clapboard or another wooden siding. The Josiah Day House in West Springfield, Massachusetts, is constructed of brick.

== Images ==
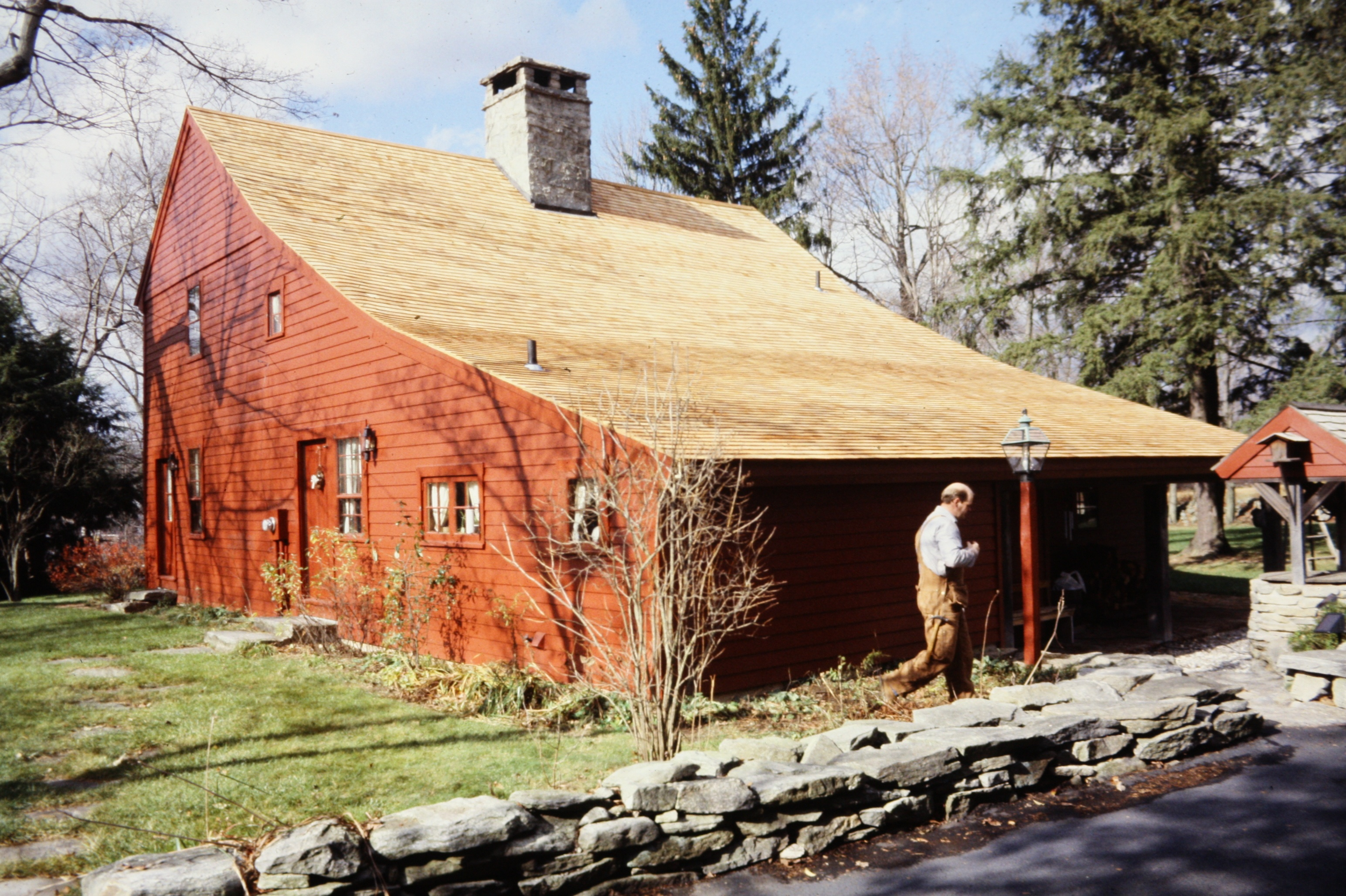
Multiple-pitched rear roof of Thomas Hawley House, Monroe, Connecticut

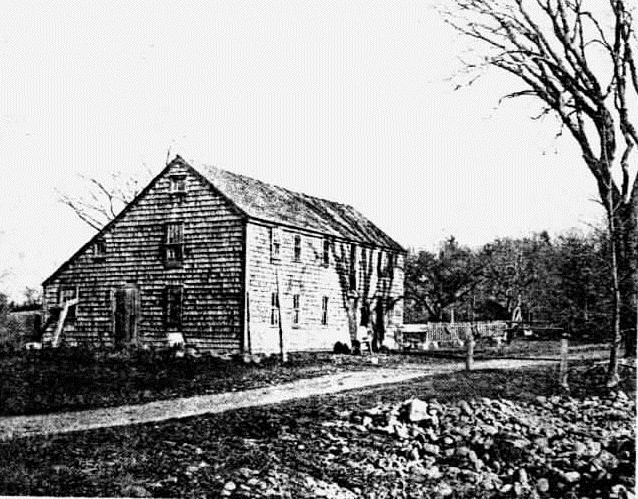
c. 1643 Edmund Rice homestead in Sudbury (now Wayland, Massachusetts), destroyed by fire c. 1912

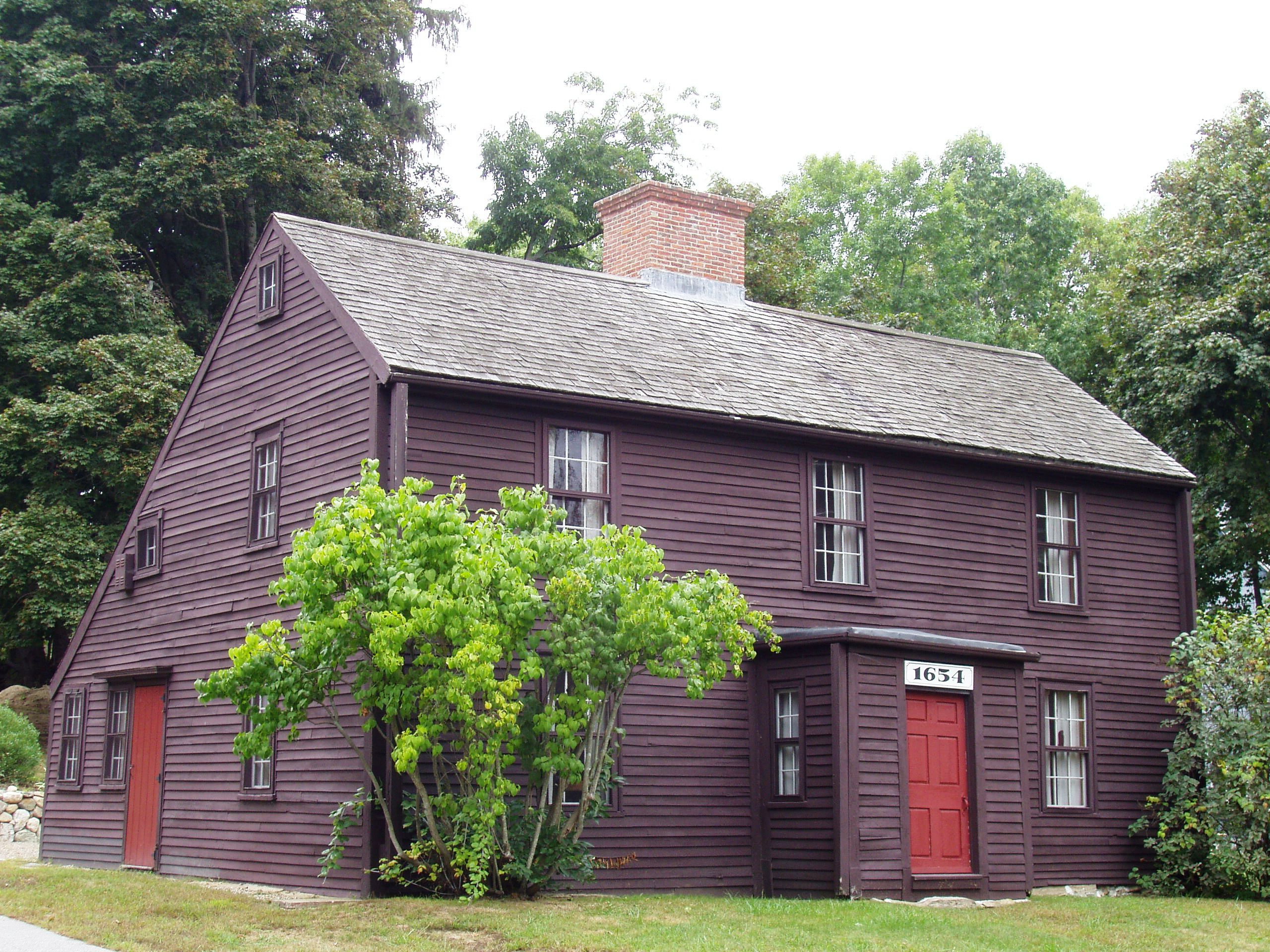
c. 1651 Macy–Colby House, Amesbury, Massachusetts

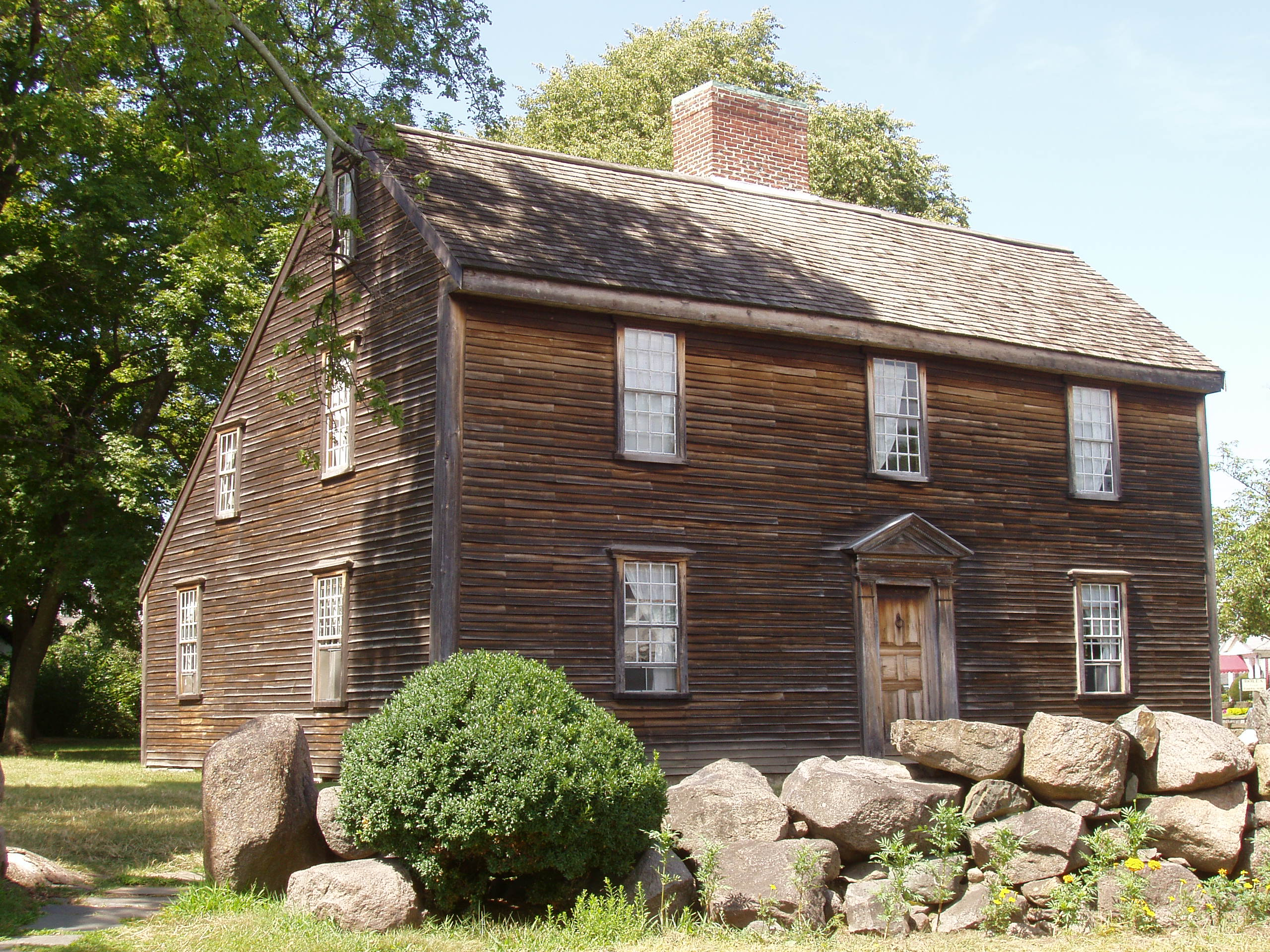
c. 1681 John Adams Birthplace, Quincy, Massachusetts

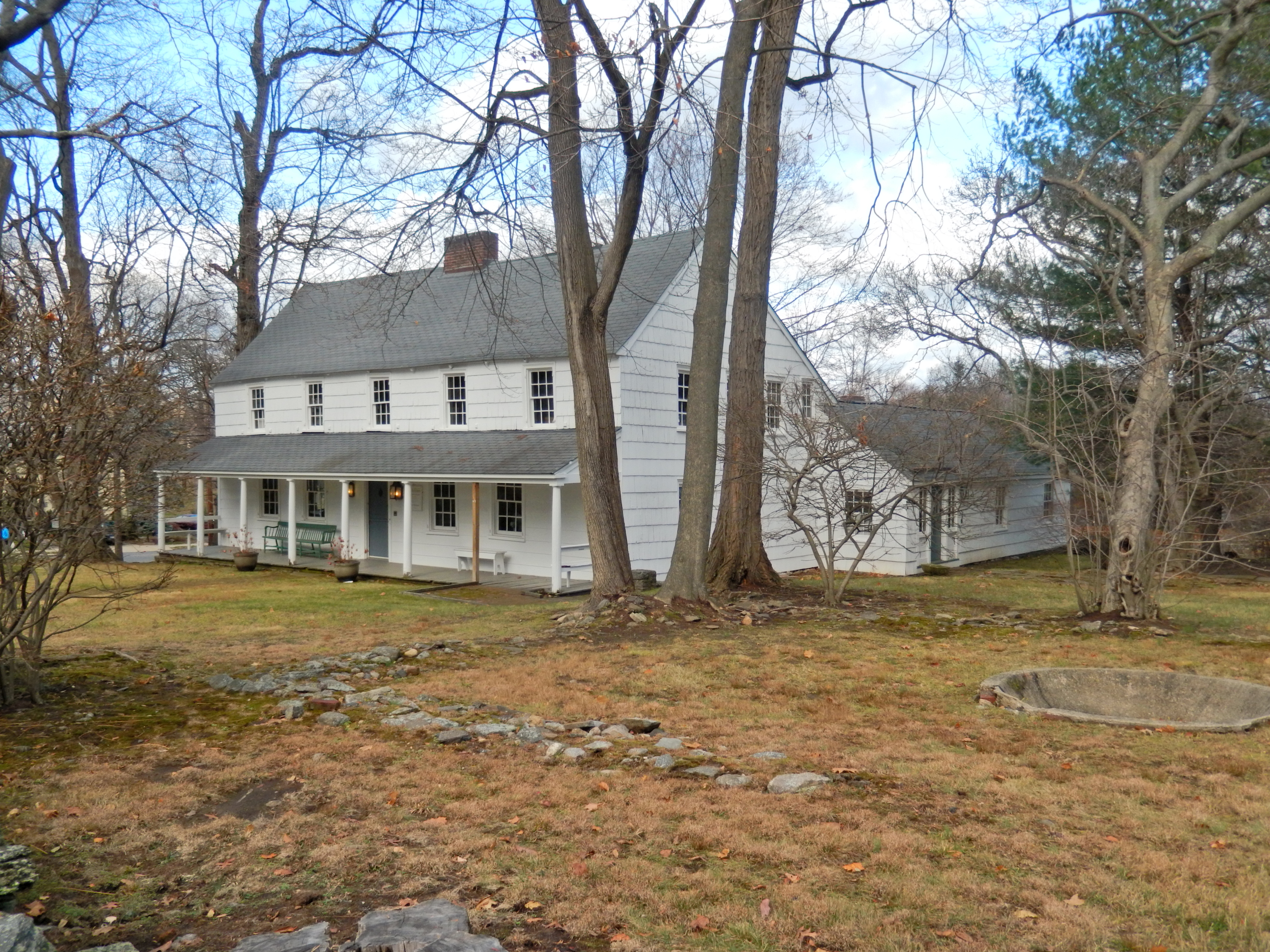
c. 1667-1670 Timothy Knapp House, Rye, New York

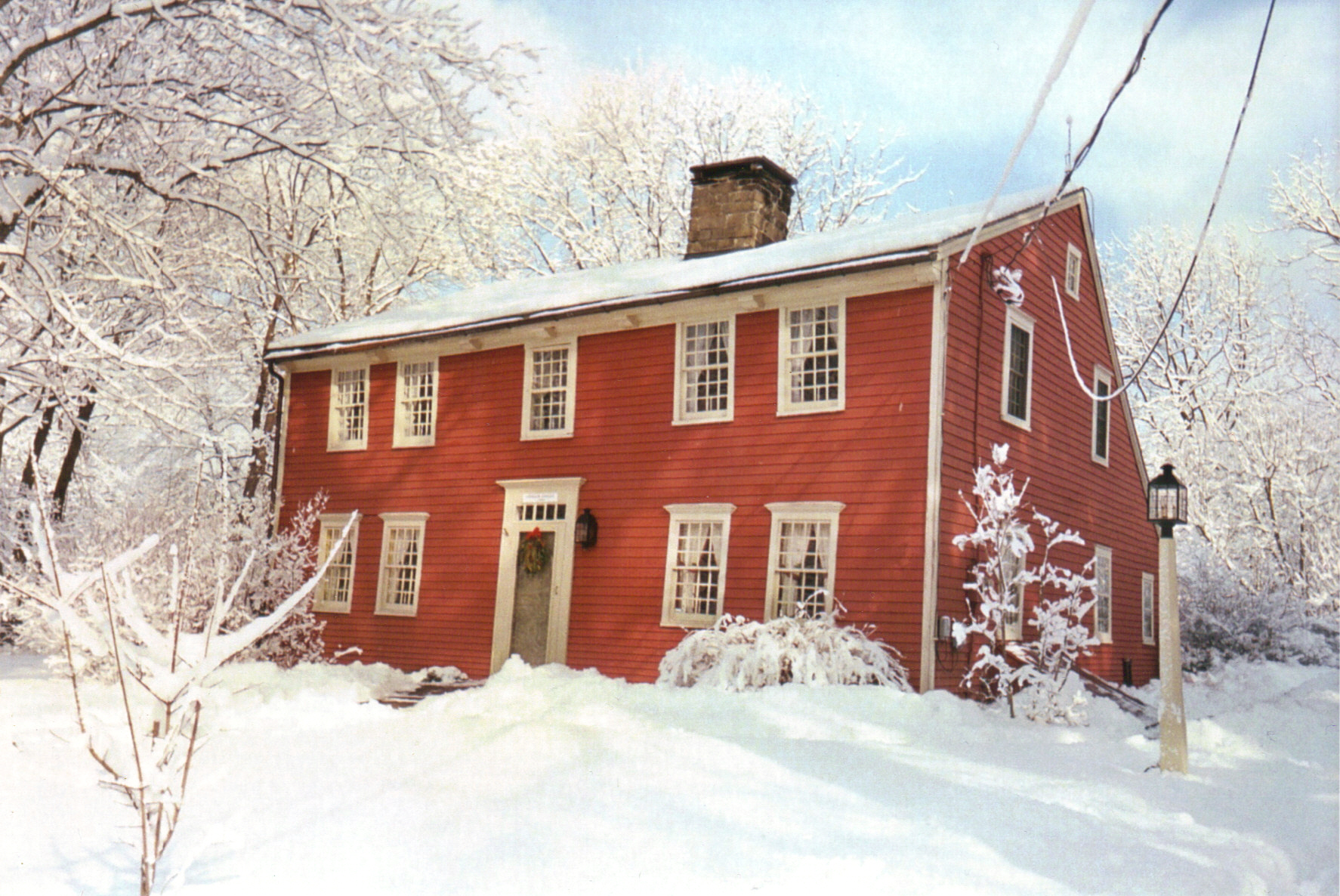
c. 1683 Ephraim Hawley House, Nichols, Connecticut

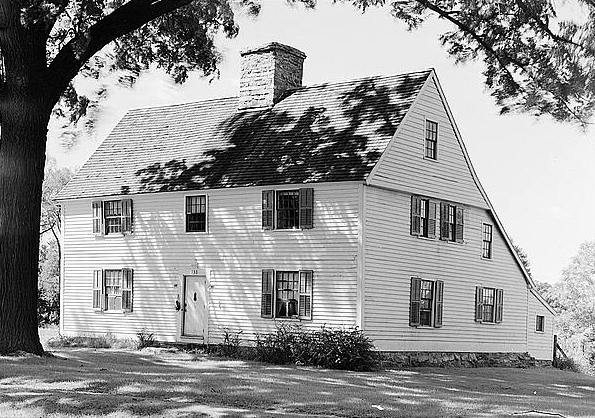
c. 1695 Comfort Starr House, Guilford, Connecticut

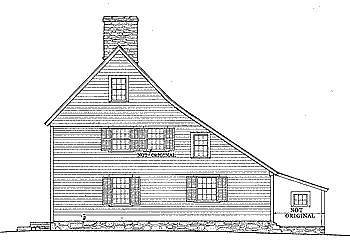
Side elevation of Comfort Starr House, illustrating the multiple-pitched roof line

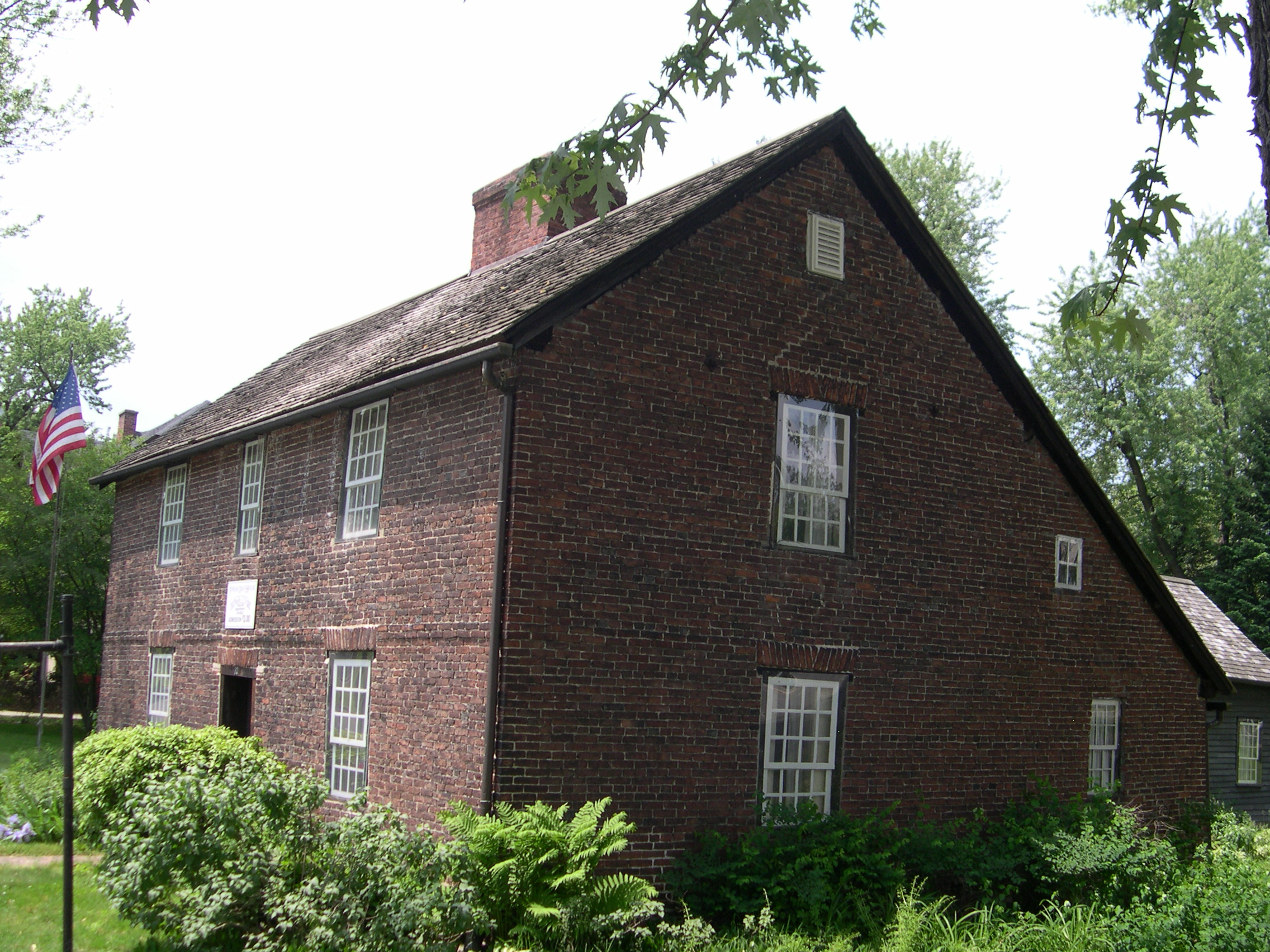
c. 1754 Brick Josiah Day House, West Springfield, Massachusetts

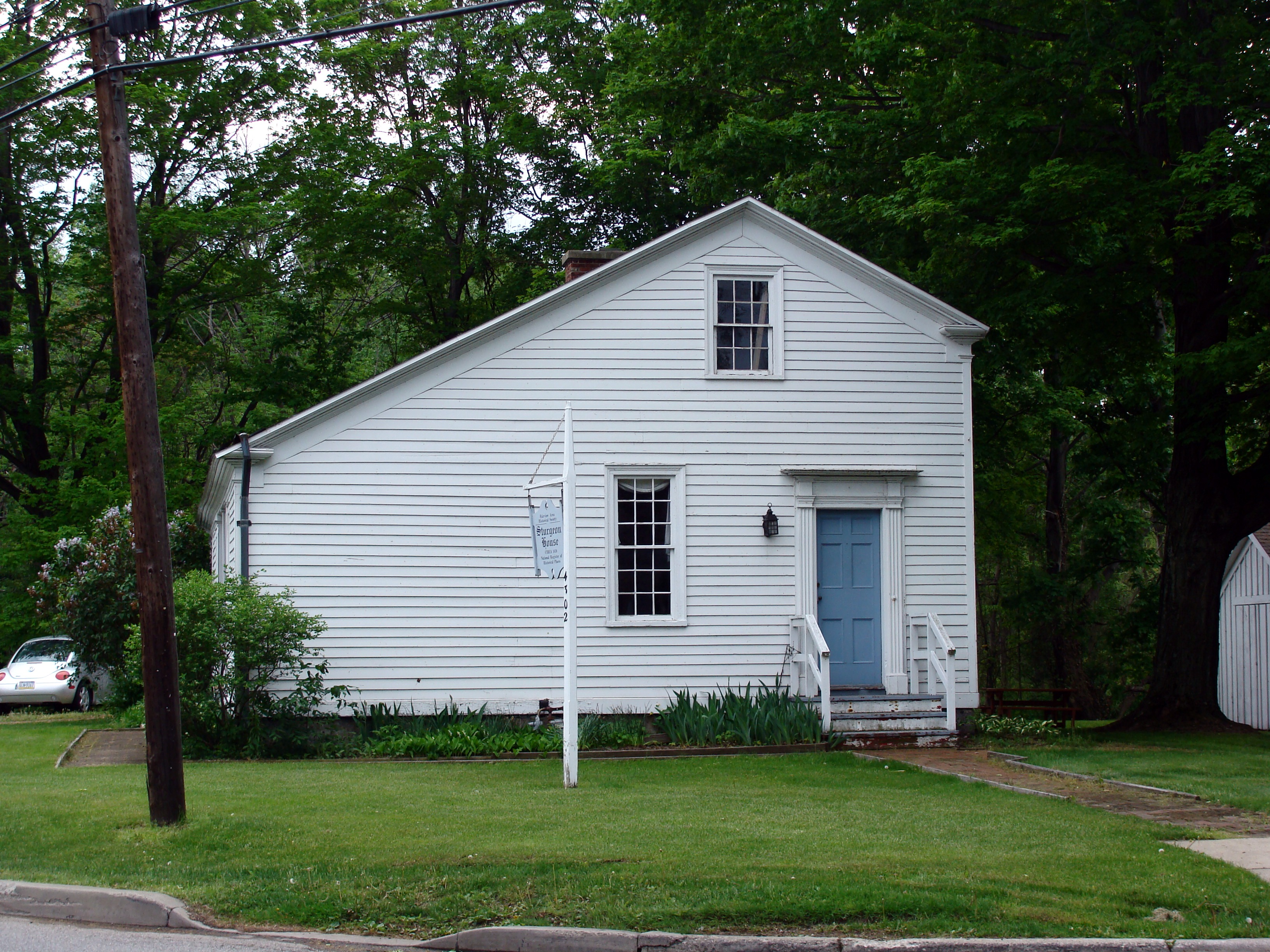
c. 1838, Sturgeon House, Fairview, Pennsylvania

== See also ==
- List of house types
- Cape Cod (house)
