= Henry Whitfield =

Henry Whitfield may refer to:

- Henry Whitfield (cricketer) (1903–1937), Australian cricketer
- Henry Whitfield (lawyer) (1619–1688), Irish politician
- Henry L. Whitfield (1868–1927), Governor of Mississippi
- Henry Wase Whitfield (1814–1877), commander of British troops in China
- Henry Whitfield (minister), a founder of Guilford, Connecticut
  - Henry Whitfield House
- Henry D. Whitfield, brother-in-law of Andrew Carnegie and architectural partner in Whitfield & King
