= Sheafe (surname) =

Sheafe is a surname. Notable people by that name include:

- James Sheafe (1755–1829), United States Representative and Senator from New Hampshire
- Alexander Sheafe, governor of the Bank of England from 1752 to 1754
- Thomas Sheafe (died 1639), canon of Windsor from 1614 to 1639

== See also ==
- Sheafe Baronets
