= Charles Lumley (MP) =

British politician (c. 1693 – 1728)

Charles Lumley (c. 1693 – 1728) was a British politician who sat in the House of Commons from 1727 to 1728. He was the fifth son of Richard Lumley, 1st Earl of Scarbrough, of Lumley Castle, county Durham, and Stanstead, near Chichester, Sussex, and his wife Frances Jones, daughter of Sir Henry Jones of Aston, Oxfordshire. He was the brother of James, John and Thomas Lumley, all MPs

Lumley was Equerry to the Prince of Wales from 1718 and then, from about 1726, groom of the bedchamber to George II as Prince of Wales and King. He was returned unopposed for Chichester at the 1727 British general election on the joint interests of his brother Lord Scarbrough and the Duke of Richmond.

Lumley died unmarried on 11 August 1728.

Parliament of Great Britain
Preceded by Lord William Beauclerk; Thomas Miller	Member of Parliament for Chichester; 1727–1728; With: Lord William Beauclerk	Succeeded by Lord William Beauclerk; James Lumley
