= Roger Fenwick =

Roger Fenwick may refer to:

- Roger Fenwick (Roundhead) (1632–1658), English lieutenant-colonel in the New Model Army
- Roger Fenwick (MP for Morpeth) (c. 1662 – by October 1701), English politician
