= Richard Lumley, 1st Earl of Scarbrough =

English army officer and politician (1650–1721)

The Right Honourable The Earl of Scarbrough PC
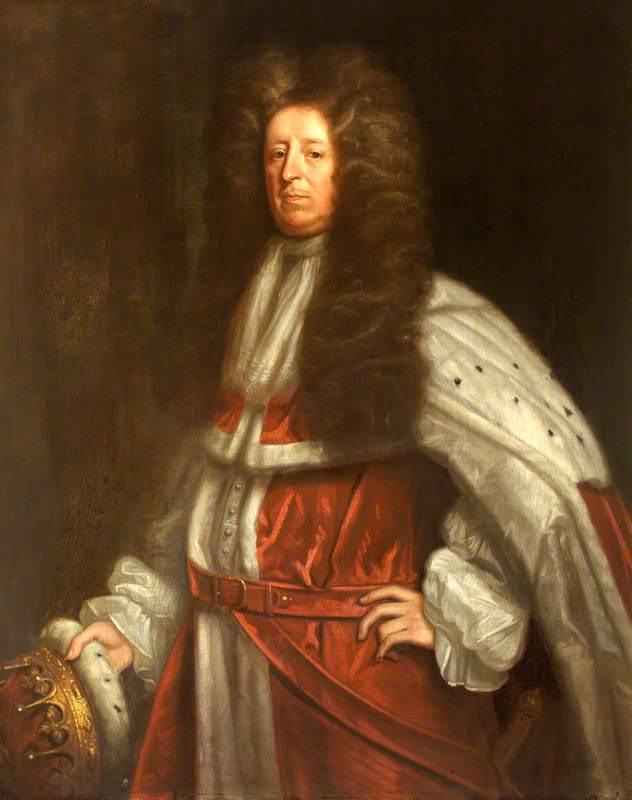
- Portrait in the style of Jonathan Richardson, 1690–1700

Chancellor of the Duchy of Lancaster
- In office 12 March 1716 – 19 June 1717
- Monarch: George I
- Preceded by: The Earl of Aylesford
- Succeeded by: Nicholas Lechmere

Personal details
- Born: 1650
- Died: 17 December 1721 (aged 70–71)
- Spouse: Frances Jones
- Children: 9, including Henry, Richard, Thomas, Charles, John, and James

Lieutenant-General Richard Lumley, 1st Earl of Scarbrough (c. 1650 – 17 December 1721) was an English army officer and Whig politician best known for his role in the Glorious Revolution.

== Origins ==
Lumley was the son of John Lumley and Mary Compton, and the grandson of Richard Lumley, 1st Viscount Lumley, and Frances Shelley. The Lumleys were an ancient family from the north of England. Richard became the 2nd Viscount Lumley (in the Irish peerage) on his grandfather's death in 1661/1662, his father having died in 1658. He was brought up as a Roman Catholic and was taken on the Grand Tour by a Catholic priest, Richard Lassels, but had turned Protestant by the time of his introduction into the House of Lords on 19 May 1685.

== Early career ==
Lumley attended the Duke of York on his way to Scotland in November 1679 and was a volunteer in the abortive expedition to Tangier in 1680. In the latter year, he was appointed Master of the Horse to Catherine of Braganza, whose Treasurer he later became in 1684. He was created Baron Lumley by Charles II on 31 May 1681. He played a prominent part in the suppression of the rebellion of the Duke of Monmouth, having been personally responsible (according to John Evelyn) at the head of the Sussex Militia for Monmouth's arrest, unarmed and bearded in a dry ditch covered with fern brakes. From 1685 to 1687, he was Colonel of the Queen Dowager's or 9th Regiment of Horse.

== Career following the Glorious Revolution ==
Lumley was one of the Immortal Seven, the English noblemen who invited William of Orange to invade England and depose his father-in-law, James II. He secured Newcastle for William in December 1688. After William became King, he appointed Lumley in rapid succession in 1689/90 as a Gentleman of the Bedchamber, a member of the Privy Council, Colonel of the 1st Troop of Horse Guards (until 1699), Viscount Lumley of Lumley Castle, Lord Lieutenant of Northumberland and Lord Lieutenant of Durham. Lumley was created Earl of Scarbrough on 15 April 1690.

Scarbrough took part in the Battle of the Boyne in 1690 and was afterwards in Flanders. He was appointed major-general in May 1692 and lieutenant-general on 4 October 1694, retiring from active service after the Treaty of Ryswick in 1697 (though he received a new commission as lieutenant-general of all the forces on 9 March 1701/2). He was Chancellor of the Duchy of Lancaster from 1716 to 1717. After his elevation, he significantly extended his family seat at Lumley Castle. He died of apoplexy in Gerard Street, Soho, on 17 December 1721.

== Family ==
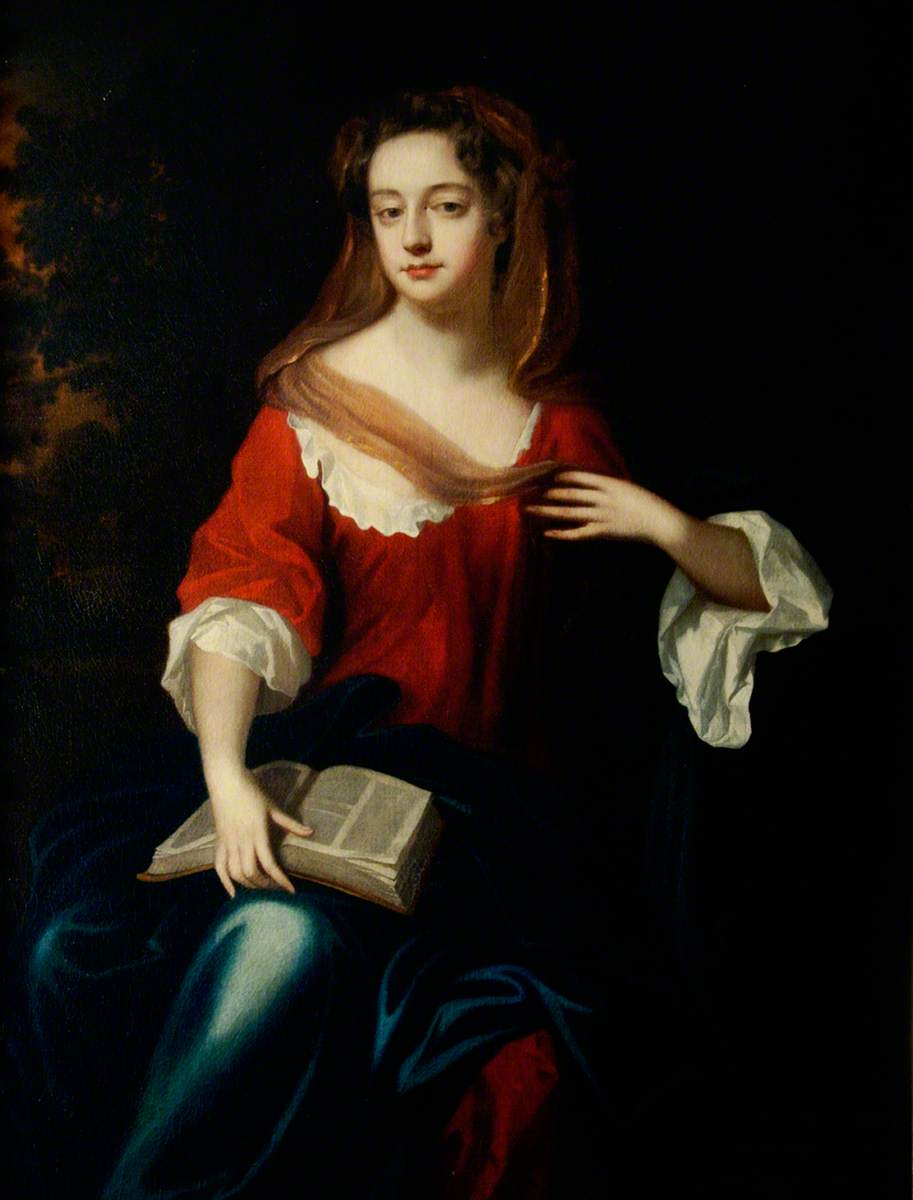
Frances, Countess of Scarborough

Lumley was married to Frances Jones (1665–1722), daughter of Sir Henry Jones of Oxfordshire. The Countess served as a Lady of the Bedchamber at the court of Queen Anne.

He and his wife had children:

- Henry Lumley, Viscount Lumley, (died 1710)
- Richard Lumley, 2nd Earl of Scarbrough, (1688 – 29 January 1739)
- Mary, (14 December 1690 – 12 December 1726), who married George Montague, 1st Earl of Halifax
- William, (died 9 April 1709)
- Thomas Lumley, 3rd Earl of Scarborough, (1691 – 15 March 1752)
- Charles Lumley (c.1693–1728)
- Ann (died 28 February 1740)
- John Lumley (c.1703–1739)
- James Lumley (c.1706–1766)

Military offices
New regiment	Colonel of The Queen Dowager's Regiment of Horse; 1685–1687	Succeeded by Sir John Talbot
Preceded by The Earl of Feversham	Captain and Colonel of His Majesty's Own Troop of Horse Guards; 1689–1699	Succeeded by The Earl of Albemarle
Honorary titles
Preceded by The Duke of Newcastle	Lord Lieutenant of Northumberland; 1689–1721	Succeeded by The Earl of Scarbrough
Preceded by The Duke of Newcastle	Custos Rotulorum of Northumberland; 1689–1721	Succeeded by The Earl of Scarbrough
Preceded by The Earl of Mulgrave	Vice-Admiral of Northumberland; 1689–1702	Succeeded by Mark Shafto
Preceded by The Earl of Mulgrave	Vice-Admiral of Durham; 1689–1702	Succeeded by The Lord Crew
Preceded by Nathaniel Crew	Lord Lieutenant of Durham; 1690–1712	Succeeded by The Lord Crew
Preceded by The Lord Crew	Vice-Admiral of Durham; 1710	Succeeded by Viscount Lumley
Preceded by The Lord Crew	Lord Lieutenant of Durham; 1715–1721	Succeeded by William Talbot
Political offices
Preceded by The Earl of Aylesford	Chancellor of the Duchy of Lancaster; 1716–1717	Succeeded by Nicholas Lechmere
Peerage of England
New creation	Earl of Scarbrough; 1690–1721	Succeeded by Richard Lumley
New creation	Viscount Lumley; 1689–1721	Succeeded by Richard Lumley
New creation	Baron Lumley (descended by acceleration); 1681–1715	Succeeded by Richard Lumley
Peerage of Ireland
Preceded by Richard Lumley	Viscount Lumley; 1663–1721	Succeeded by Richard Lumley
