= John Lumley (Arundel MP) =

British politician (c. 1703–1739)

John Lumley (c. 1703–1739) was a British Army officer, courtier and politician who sat in the House of Commons from 1728 to 1739.

Lumley was the sixth son of Richard Lumley, 1st Earl of Scarbrough and his wife Frances Jones, daughter of Sir Henry Jones of Oxfordshire. He joined the army and was cornet in the 7th Dragoons in 1721 and captain in 1723.

Lumley was appointed equerry to the King in 1727. At the 1727 British general election, he stood for Arundel on the family interest but came bottom of the poll. However, he was seated on petition as Member of Parliament for Arundel on 23 February 1728. Holding a court appointment, he voted consistently with the Government. In 1732, he became captain and lieutenant-colonel of the 2nd Foot Guards. He was returned unopposed as MP for Arundel at the 1734 British general election. Also in 1734, he became groom of the bedchamber to the Prince of Wales. He later became one of the Prince of Wales party when the Prince set up in opposition to his father King George II. The King referred to Lumley as ‘that stuttering puppy, Johnny Lumley’ being one of the ‘boobies and fools’ whom the Prince of Wales listened to. Lumley abstained from voting on the Spanish convention in October 1739.

Lumley died unmarried on 16 October 1739.

Parliament of Great Britain
Preceded by Sir John Shelley, Bt; The Viscount Gage	Member of Parliament for Arundel; 1728–1739; With: Sir John Shelley, Bt	Succeeded by Sir John Shelley, Bt; Garton Orme
