= Garton Orme =

British Member of Parliament (c1696-1758)

Garton Orme (c. 1696–1758) of Woolavington, near Midhurst, Sussex, was a British politician who sat in the House of Commons from 1739 to 1754. He left a grim reputation for wickedness.

Orme was the eldest surviving son of Robert Orme, of Woolavington, Sussex and his wife Dorothea Dawney, daughter of John Dawnay, 1st Viscount Downe. When his father died in 1711, and he succeeded to the Lavington estate, his neighbour, the Duke of Richmond took him up. He married Charlotte Hanway, daughter of Captain Jonas Hanway, RN in 1715. She died in January 1727, and on 4 March 1727 he married as his second wife Anne Lafitte, daughter of Rev. Daniel Lafitte of Bordeaux, vicar of Woolavington.

Orme was appointed Gentleman Usher to the Princess of Wales on her marriage in 1736 and retained the post for the rest of his life. He was returned unopposed as Member of Parliament for Arundel on his own interest at a by-election on 23 November 1739. He voted with the Opposition as a servant of the Prince of Wales. He was re-elected at the 1741 British general election after an expensive contest, spending money so freely that it was thought that the Prince was financing him. He consistently voted with the Leicester House party, although he was only a minor figure.

At the 1747 British general election Orme was again returned for Arundel, with Theobald Taaffe, defeating candidates supported by his old patron, the Duke of Richmond. The Duke unsuccessfully tried to induce his candidates to petition ‘against the bribery of Orme and Taaffe’. Learning of moves to turn him out at the next election, he wrote in 1748 to the Duke, suggesting that they should reach a mutually satisfactory arrangement relating to the borough. He became Gentleman in Waiting to the Prince. Soon afterwards he fell into financial difficulties. In 1750 a private Act was passed enabling him to sell or mortgage his estates and his daughter's portion to pay his debts. In 1752 he sold his East Dean estate for £12,000. He did not stand in the 1754 election.

Orme died on 20 October 1758 leaving one daughter by his first wife and an appalling reputation. According to tradition, he pushed his first wife down a well and when, in 1845, one of the Orme coffins was opened and found to be full of stones, the story was given some credence. It was also said that he hired a highwayman to waylay his daughter when she went to London to protest against his alienation of her patrimony. For many years it was a custom of the owners and heirs of Lavington to commemorate Orme by spitting when they reached the boundary of the East Dean estate.

Parliament of Great Britain
Preceded by Sir John Shelley, Bt; John Lumley	Member of Parliament for Arundel; 1739 –1754; With: Sir John Shelley, Bt 1739-1741; James Lumley 1741-1747; Theobald Taafe 1747-1754	Succeeded by Sir George Colebrooke, Bt; Thomas Griffin
