= George Fenwick (Parliamentarian) =

2nd Governor of Saybrook Colony
- In office 1639–1644
- Preceded by: John Winthrop the Younger
- Succeeded by: Theophilus Eaton (New Haven Colony)

Commissioner for Connecticut River Colony
- In office 1643–1645 Serving with Edward Hopkins, John Brown
- In office 1647–1648 Serving with Edward Hopkins, John Mason, William Whiting, John Brown, Roger Ludlow

Member of Parliament for Morpeth
- In office 1645–1648
- Preceded by: John Fenwick
- Succeeded by: Robert Mitford

Personal details
- Born: 1603? England
- Died: 1657 England
- Profession: Parliamentarian and governor

George Fenwick (1603?–1657), was an English Parliamentarian, and a leading colonist in the short-lived Saybrook Colony.

== Early life ==
Fenwick was the son of George Fenwick of Brinkburn, Northumberland, and Dorothy, daughter of John Forster of Newham, was born about 1603. Fenwick was called to the bar at Gray's Inn on 21 November 1631, and admitted ancient on 24 May 1650.

== Settlement in America ==
He took an active part in the scheme for colonising Connecticut, signed the agreement of the patentees with John Winthrop the Younger in 1635, and visited Boston in 1636. In 1639 he settled with his wife and family in the Saybrook Colony at the mouth of the Connecticut River, as agent for the patentees and governor of the fort of Saybrook. In 1642 upon the death of Native American leader, Wequash Cook, Fenwick took in Cook's son, Wenamoag, to raise, but it is unknown what happened to Wenamoag after Fenwick's wife died and Fenwick returned to England in 1645.

Letters written by him during his residence in America are printed in the Massachusetts Historical Collections, iv. 6, 365, v. 1, 223, and in the publications of the Prince Society, Hutchinson Papers, i. 120. At the meeting of the commissioners of the united colonies in 1643, Fenwick, as agent of the patentees, was one of the two representatives of Connecticut. On 5 December 1644 he sold the fort at Saybrook and its appurtenances to the Colony of Connecticut, pledging himself at the same time that all the lands mentioned in the patent should fall under the jurisdiction of Connecticut if it came into his power. The non-fulfilment of this promise led to numerous disputes, and in 1657 the colony refused to give his heirs possession of his estate until they paid 500£ for non-fulfilment of the agreement and gave an acquittance of all claims. Fenwick returned to England in 1645. While living at Saybrook he lost his first wife; her monument is said to be still extant there.

== Parliamentary career ==
On 20 Oct 1645 Fenwick was elected to the Long Parliament as member for Morpeth. During the Second English Civil War he commanded a regiment of northern militia, took part in the defeat of Sir Richard Tempest by Lambert, relieved Holy Island, and recaptured Fenham Castle. On the surrender of Berwick he became governor of that place, apparently at first as deputy for Sir Arthur Haslerig. Fenwick was appointed one of the commissioners for the trial of the king, but did not act. In 1650 he took part in Cromwell's invasion of Scotland, was made Governor of Leith and Edinburgh Castle in December 1650, and took Hume Castle in February 1651. He was also one of the eight commissioners appointed for the government of Scotland in December 1651, after the Tender of Union.

In the two Protectorate parliaments of 1654 and 1656 he represented Berwick, and was one of the members excluded from the second of those parliaments.

== Private life ==
Coat of Arms of George Fenwick

According to his monument in the parish church of Berwick, Fenwick died on 15 March 1657, and this is confirmed by the fact that a new writ for Berwick was moved on 26 March 1657. His will, signed 8 March 1657. In some accounts Fenwick is confused with Lieutenant-colonel Roger Fenwick, who was killed in the Battle of Dunkirk, 4 June 1658.

Fenwick was twice married: first, to Alice, daughter of Sir Edward Apsley of Thakeham, Sussex, and widow of Sir John Boteler of Teston, Kent (he died 2 August 1634). Secondly, to Catherine, eldest daughter of Sir Arthur Haslerig, born in 1635, who married, after the death of Fenwick, Colonel Philip Babington, and died in 1670.

== Notes ==
Political offices
Preceded by John Winthrop the Younger	Governor of the Saybrook Colony; 1639–1644	Colony merged with the Connecticut Colony
Parliament of England
Vacant Title last held by John Fenwick	Member of Parliament for Morpeth; 1640–1652; With: John Fiennes	Vacant Morpeth not represented in Barebones Parliament
Vacant Berwick-upon-Tweed not represented in Barebones Parliament	Member of Parliament for Berwick-upon-Tweed; 1654–1657	Succeeded by John Rushworth
