= James Lumley =

British politician (c. 1706–1766)

James Lumley (c. 1706 – 14 March 1766) was an English Member of Parliament and landowner.

Lumley was the seventh son of Richard Lumley, 1st Earl of Scarbrough and was educated at Eton College in 1718 and King's College, Cambridge in 1723. His biography in The History of Parliament describes him as "uncouth and illiterate".

Lumley was made a Groom of the Bedchamber to the Prince of Wales in 1728, and the following year was elected to Parliament for Chichester, succeeding his brother Charles. He did not stand for re-election in 1734, instead moving to the King's Household as one of the commissioners of the office of Master of the Horse. He was appointed Avener and Clerk Marshal to the King in 1735.

In 1740 his brother Lord Scarbrough died leaving him the Lumley estates in Sussex, and in 1741 Lumley was elected to Parliament for Arundel. He initially supported Robert Walpole, but voted against him in 1742 and thereafter with the opposition. He retired from Parliament in 1747.

Lumley never married. He died "heavily in debt", and left his Durham estates to his nephew Richard Lumley-Saunderson, 4th Earl of Scarbrough and his Sussex estates to his nephew George Montagu-Dunk, 2nd Earl of Halifax.

Parliament of Great Britain
Preceded by Charles Lumley; Lord William Beauclerk	Member of Parliament for Chichester; 1729–1734; With: Lord William Beauclerk 1729–1733; Sir Thomas Prendergast 1733–1734	Succeeded by James Brudenell; Thomas Yates
Preceded by Sir John Shelley; Garton Orme	Member of Parliament for Arundel; 1741–1747; With: Garton Orme	Succeeded by Garton Orme; Theobald Taaffe
Court offices
Vacant Title last held by Francis Negus	Avener and Clerk Marshal; 1734–1741	Succeeded by Edmund Charles Blomberg
