= Henry Lumley, Viscount Lumley =

British politician (c. 1685–1710)

Henry Lumley, Viscount Lumley (c. 1685 – 24 April 1710), of Stansted Park, Sussex and Lumley Castle, county Durham, was a British Whig politician who sat in the House of Commons from 1708 to 1710.

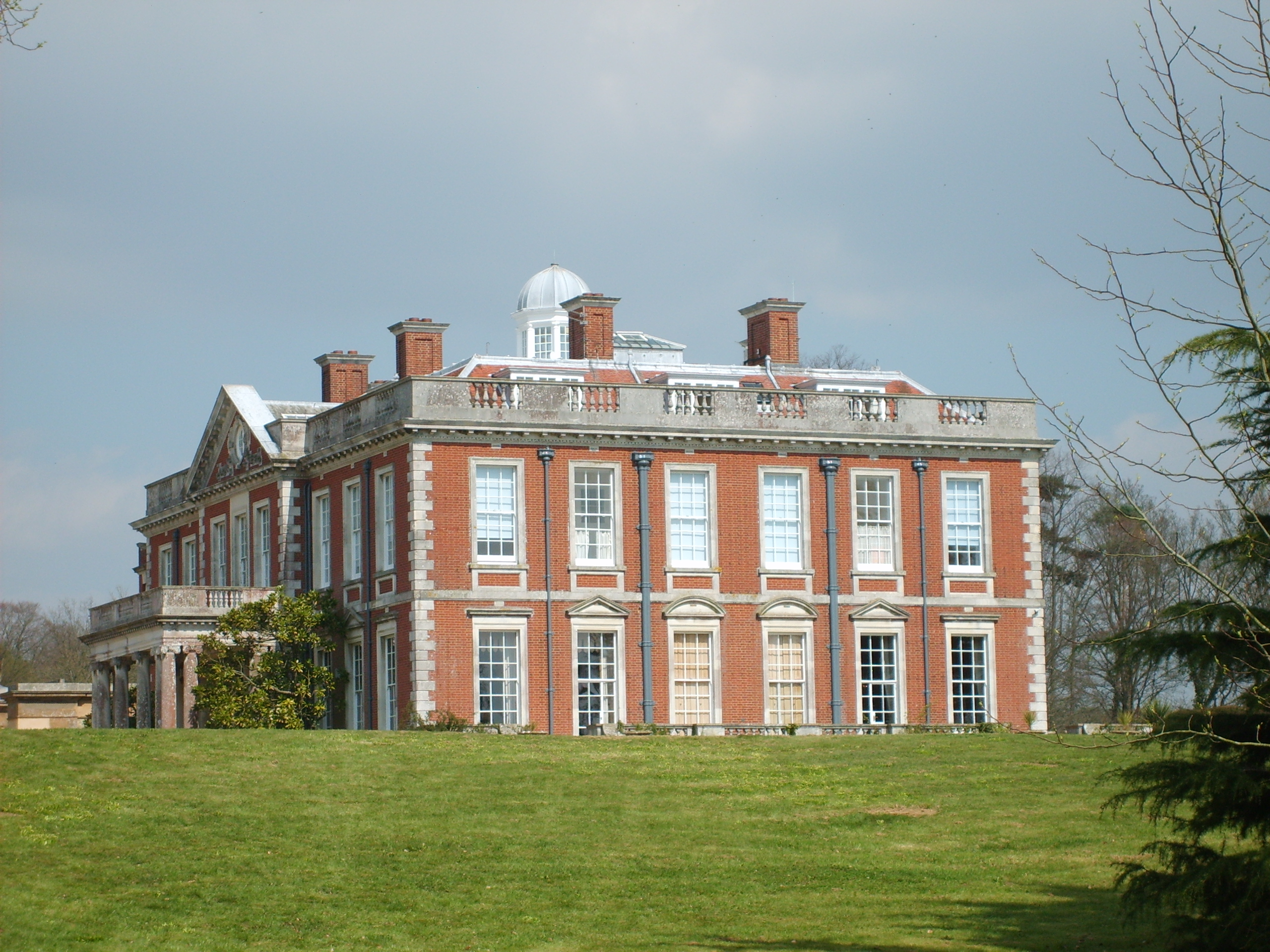
Stansted House

Lumley was the eldest son of Richard Lumley, 1st Earl of Scarbrough and his wife Frances Jones, daughter of Sir Henry Jones of Aston, Oxfordshire. He was educated at Eton College in 1698 and matriculated from King's College, Cambridge at Easter 1703. He became a Captain in the 1st Dragoon Guards in 1708.

Lumley was returned as Whig Member of Parliament for Arundel, near the family estates in Sussex, at a by-election on 7 December 1708. Early in 1710, he voted for the impeachment of Henry Sacheverell. His career was cut short due to his death by smallpox in 1710.

Lumley died unmarried on 24 April 1710 and was buried at St Martin-in-the-Fields. He was extremely small in stature, and was even referred to as a ‘pigmy’ by one contemporary. Alexander Pope, another small man, expressed regret on the death of Lumley, whom he considered a hero.

Parliament of Great Britain
Preceded by Sir Henry Peachey, Bt; The Viscount Shannon	Member of Parliament for Arundel; 1708–1710; With: The Viscount Shannon	Succeeded by The Earl of Thomond; Viscount Lumley
