= John Fenwick (MP for Morpeth) =

Royalist soldier and politician

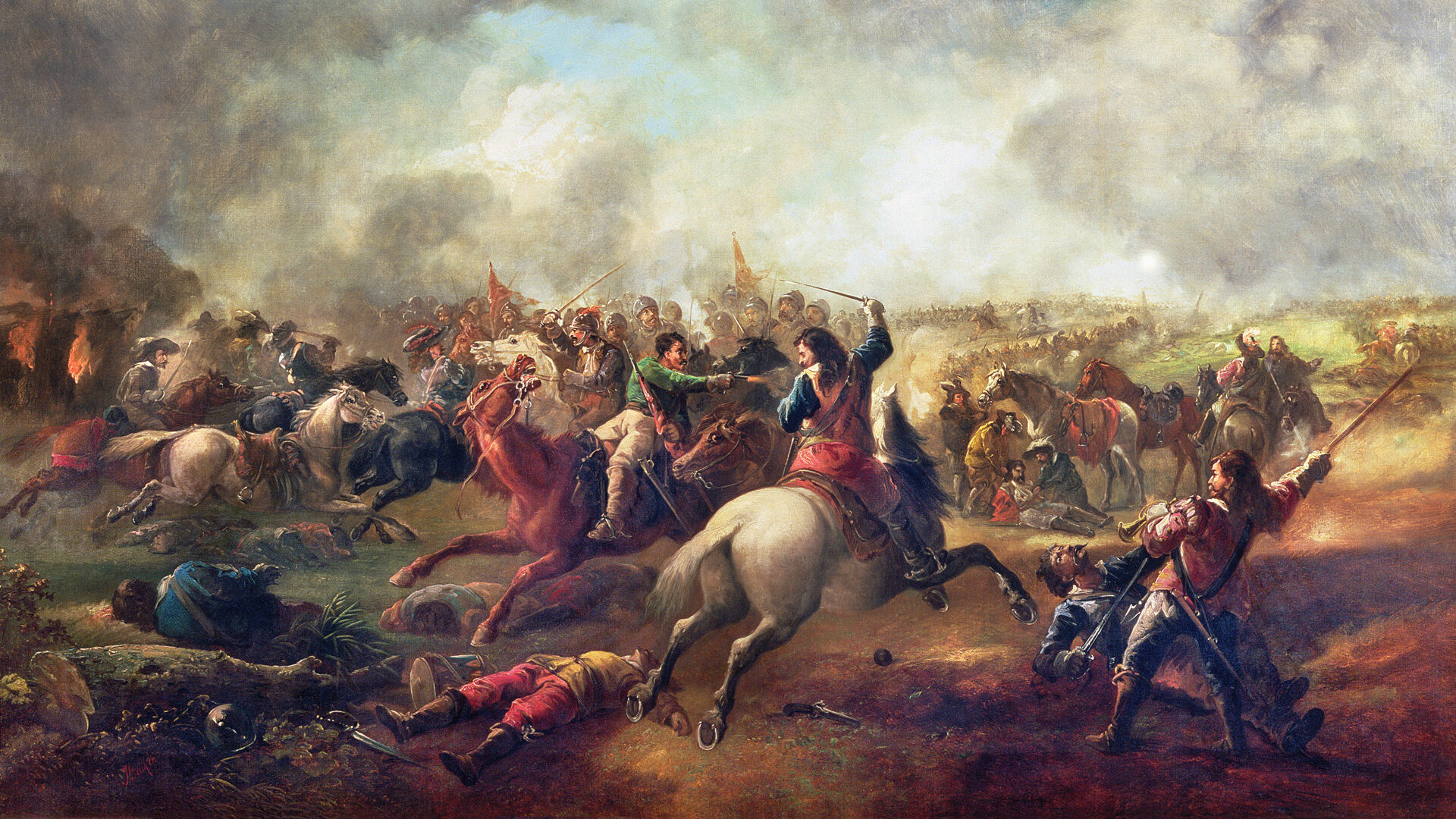
- Battle of Marston Moor, where Fenwick was killed on 2 July 1644

Member of Parliament for Morpeth
- In office November 1640 – January 1644 (excluded)

Personal details
- Born: 14 January 1602 Wallington Hall Yorkshire
- Died: 2 July 1644 (aged 42) Long Marston, North Yorkshire
- Spouse: Mary Selby
- Education: Trinity College, Cambridge
- Occupation: MP and soldier

Military service
- Allegiance: Royalist
- Rank: Colonel
- Unit: Colonel John Fenwick’s Troop of Dragoons
- Battles/wars: First English Civil War; Skirmish at Corbridge; Siege of Newcastle; Battle of Marston Moor †

John Fenwick (14 January 1602 to 2 July 1644) was a Member of Parliament from Northumberland, killed serving in the Royalist army during the First English Civil War.

== Personal details ==
John Fenwick was the only son of Sir John Fenwick, 1st Baronet of Wallington Hall, Northumberland, and his first wife Katherine (1584-1616), sister to Sir Henry Slingsby, executed in 1658 for his part in a Royalist conspiracy.

He married Mary, daughter of Sir George Selby, of Whitehouse, County Durham.

== Career ==
Fenwick matriculated from Trinity College, Cambridge at Easter 1628. He was admitted at Gray's Inn on 28 April 1630.

In November 1640, Fenwick was elected Member of Parliament for Morpeth, Northumberland in the Long Parliament. In early 1644, he raised a troop of dragoons for the Royalist Northern Army; and was excluded from Parliament on 22 January 1644.

His troop was at the siege of Newcastle, and a skirmish near Corbridge in 1644. He was killed at the Battle of Marston Moor on 2 July 1644.

== Sources ==
- Hodgson, John; Hodgson-Hinde, John (1827), A History of Northumberland: The topography and local antiquities, arranged in parishes, A History of Northumberland: In Three Parts, vol. 1, E. Walker, p. 256
- Willis, Browne (1750). Notitia Parliamentaria, Part II: A Series or Lists of the Representatives in the several Parliaments held from the Reformation 1541, to the Restoration 1660 ... London. pp. 240, 247.
- Plant, David. "Colonel John Fenwick's Troop of Dragoons". BCW Project.
- Scott, David (2004). "Slingsby, Sir Henry, first baronet". Oxford Dictionary of National Biography (online ed.). Oxford University Press. doi:10.1093/ref:odnb/25727. (Subscription, Wikipedia Library access or UK public library membership required.)

Parliament of England
Preceded by Sir Philip Mainwaring; Thomas Witherings	Member of Parliament for Morpeth; 1640–1644; With: Sir William Carnaby 1640–1642	Succeeded by John Fiennes; George Fenwick
