= Sir John Shelley, 4th Baronet =

British Whig politician

Sir John Shelley 4th Baronet (5 March 1692 – 6 September 1771) of Mitchelgrove, Sussex, was a British Whig politician who sat in the House of Commons between 1727 and 1747.

Shelley was the eldest son of Sir John Shelley, 3rd Baronet and his second wife Mary Gage, daughter of Sir John Gage, 4th Baronet, of Firle, Sussex. He succeeded his father to the baronetcy on 25 April 1703. He was a Roman Catholic, who conformed to Anglicanism in 1716. He married Catherine Scawen, daughter of Sir Thomas Scawen of Horton, Buckinghamshire on 21 May 1717. She died in September 1726 and he married as his second wife Margaret Pelham, daughter of Thomas Pelham, 1st Baron Pelham MP of Laughton, on 16 March 1727. Her brother was Thomas Pelham-Holles, 1st Duke of Newcastle.

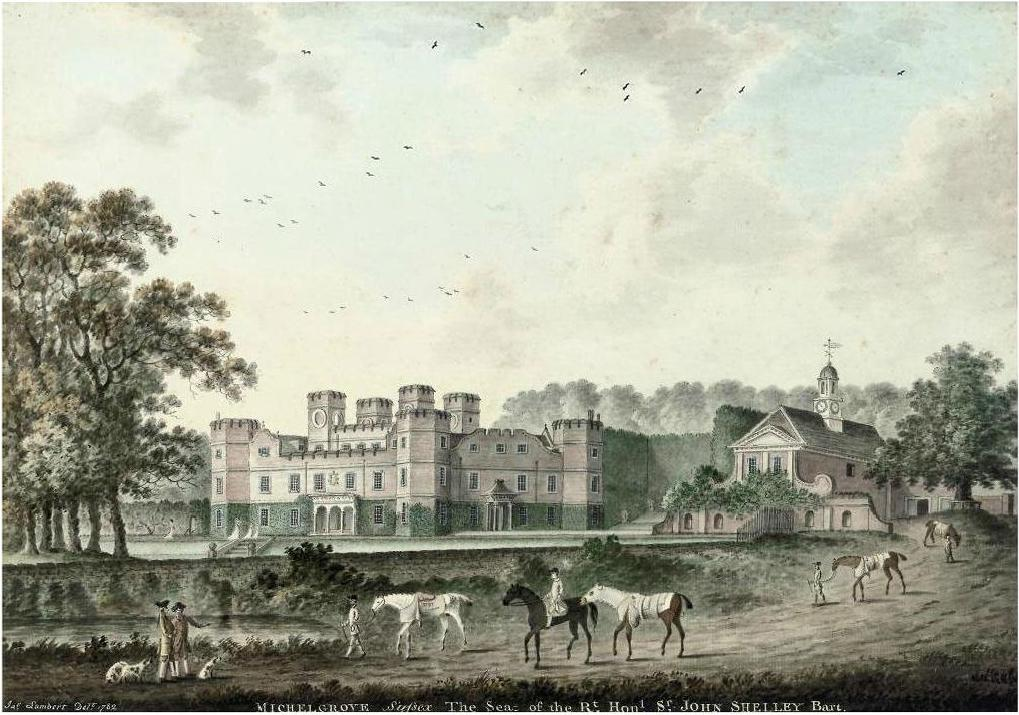
Mitchelgrove House

Shelley was elected Member of Parliament for Arundel at the 1727 general election. He supported the Government consistently throughout his parliamentary career. He was returned unopposed for Arundel at the 1734 general election but lost the seat in 1741. His brother-in-law, the Duke of Newcastle brought him in as MP for Lewes at a by-election on 6 December 1743. His wife sought an official post for her husband from her brother but nothing materialized. Questions were raised about his private life and he was dropped at the 1747 general election.

Shelley died on 6 September 1771. He had two daughters by his first wife, and a son and two daughters by his second wife. He was succeeded in the baronetcy by his son John. Henrietta, one of his daughters by his second wife Margaret, married George Onslow, 1st Earl of Onslow.

Parliament of Great Britain
| Preceded by Thomas Lumley; Joseph Micklethwaite | Member of Parliament for Arundel; 1727–1741; With: The Viscount Gage 1727-1728; John Lumley 1728-1739; Garton Orme 1739-1741 | Succeeded by James Lumley; Garton Orme |
| Preceded by Thomas Pelham; John Trevor | Member of Parliament for Lewes; 1743–1747; With: Sir Francis Poole | Succeeded by Thomas Sergison; Sir Francis Poole |
Baronetage of England
| Preceded by Sir John Shelley, 3rd Baronet | Baronet (of Michelgrove; 1703-1771 | Succeeded by Sir John Shelley, 5th Baronet |
