= Thomas Witherings =

Thomas Witherings (died 28 September 1651) was an English merchant and postal administrator who established the Royal Mail public letter service. He was a politician who sat in the House of Commons in 1640.

== Early life ==
Witherings was the second son of a Staffordshire family and his uncle Anthony Withering and brother were courtiers. He was harbinger to the Queen Henrietta Maria and may have had Roman Catholic leanings at the time, although later he was a Puritan. Witherings was admitted to the Worshipful Company of Mercers on 16 February 1625.

== Postmaster of Foreign Mails ==
In 1632, Charles I approved the appointment of Witherings as the Postmaster of Foreign Mails together with William Frizzell. Although the Postmaster was only responsible for official mail, it had become the practice to provide a service for City of London merchants dealing with the continent. In April 1633 Witherings was sent on a visit to the Calais and Antwerp to regularise the foreign mail service. However, by August 1633 rivalry had broken out between the two postmasters and both Witherings and Frizzell were suspended for a few months before being reinstated.

== Creation of state letter monopoly ==
In 1635 Witherings proposed to Charles's Council to "settle a pacquet post between London and all parts of His Majesty's dominions, for the carrying and recarrying of his subjects letters" To justify the expenditure Witherings included an argument that "anie fight at sea, anie distress of His Majestie's ships (which God forbid), anie wrong offered by anie nation to anie of ye coastes of England or anie of His Majestie's forts…the newes will come sooner than thought. In 1635 a state letter monopoly formally came into being and the public institution of the Post Office was created. It was used to raise revenues to sponsor state activities including war. The King's proclamation dated at Bagshot on 31 July 1635 which established the letter-office required Witherings to "settle a running post or two to run day and night between Edinburgh and Scotland and the City of London, to go thither and come back in six days". Under Witherings' organisation a public postal service was established with post offices connected by regular routes established, throughout the country, along the lines of communication used by the Tudor armies. Witherings opened the first post office at Bishopsgate Street in October 1635. The King charged Witherings with building six "Great Roads" to aid in the delivery of the post, of which the Great West Road was one. Postmasters on each road were required to provide horses for the mail at 2½d a mile and a conveyance tariff was fixed. Postage was paid on receipt of the letter by the addressee. Difficulties arose because Lord Stanhope held an overlapping position of Master of the Posts in England and Foreign Posts, and was responsible for the deputy postmasters that Withering had to use. This situation continued until Stanhope was dismissed in 1637.

== Parliamentary career and sequestration of his posts ==
In April 1640, Witherings was elected Member of Parliament for Morpeth in the Short Parliament. Also in April 1640, he was deprived of his position in charge of the post-office and letter-office for abuses in exercising his duties. Over the next two years a wrangle continued which concluded that the sequestration of Withering's post had been illegal, but the result was not to restore Withering but to assign them to the Earl of Warwick.

== Property ==
In 1644, Witherings was assessed by the Committee for the Advance of Money for £800, but ended paying £550. In 1646 Witherings purchased the Nelmes estate at Hornchurch from the Naunton family who as Royalists were suffering financial difficulties.

== Accusations ==
In April 1649 information was laid against Witherings that he had assisted George, Earl of Norwich in the 1648 Royalist insurrection in the county of Essex during the Second Civil War. He was imprisoned and his property seized, but he was released without charge and his property restored in May.

By 1649, Witherings had been reinstated as Postmaster of Foreign Mails and on 18 August 1649 he became Alderman for Bishopsgate ward.

In June 1651 the charges raised against him in 1649 were levelled against him again with further accusations. These were dismissed on 25 July 1651.

== Death and memorial ==
In August 1651, Witherings died on his way to worship in Hornchurch church. He was buried in the chancel and the inscription on his tablet recorded he was "second to none for unfathomed poilesicy, unparallelled sagacius and devining Genius; witness his great correspondence in all parts of ye Christian world". He left his estates at Nelmes to his nephew William Witherings.

== Family ==
Witherings married Dorothy Oliver, daughter of John Oliver of Wilbrougham. She brought him a reasonable fortune and £105 a year of her land was sold to help him procure the post of Postmaster.

== Notes ==
Parliament of England
Parliament suspended since 1629	Member of Parliament for Morpeth; 1640; With: Sir Philip Manwaring	Succeeded by Sir William Carnaby; John Fenwick
