= Henry Whitfield House =

Historic house in Connecticut

- U.S. National Register of Historic Places
- U.S. National Historic Landmark
- U.S. Historic district – Contributing property
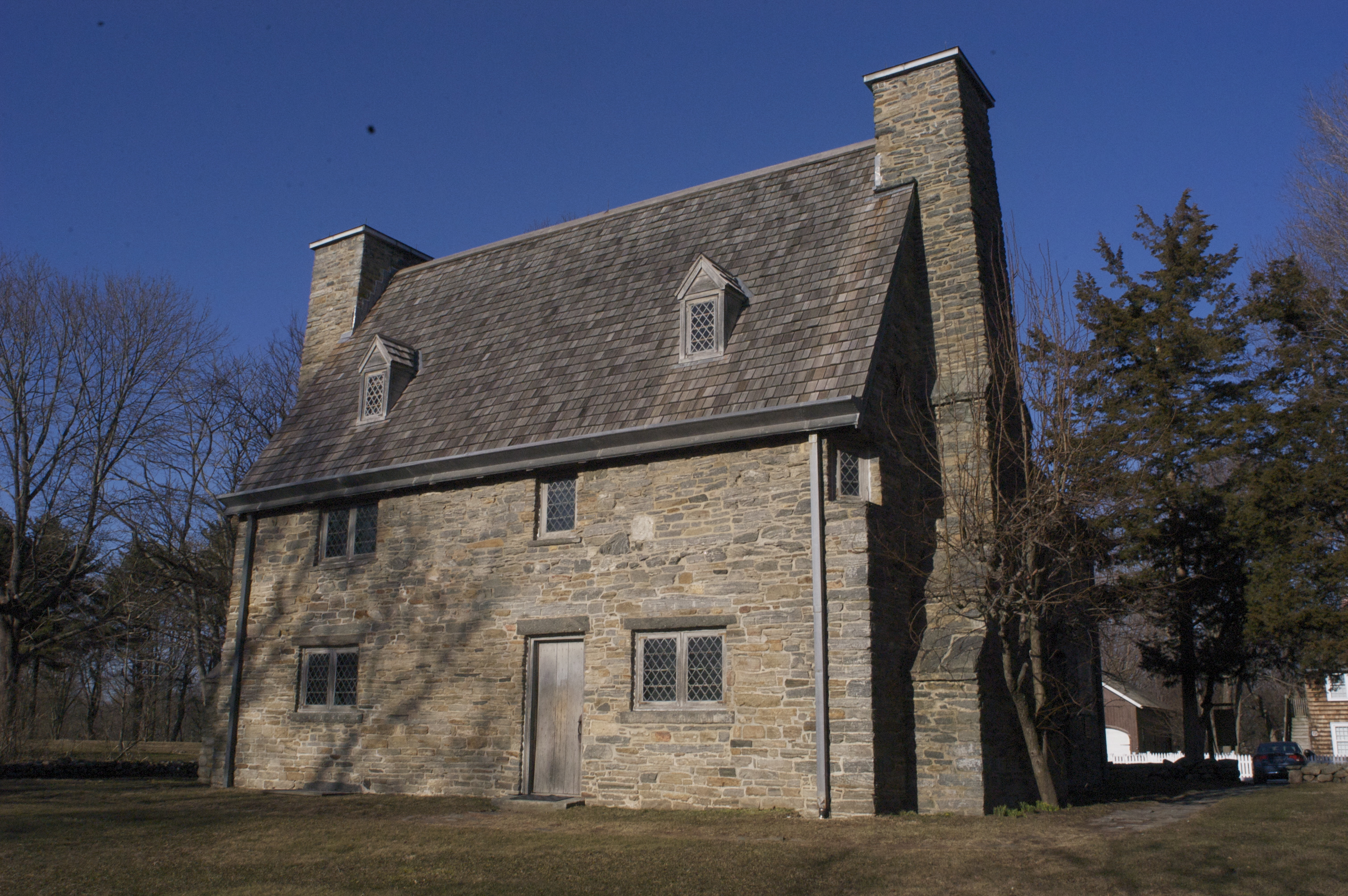
- Henry Whitfield House, the oldest house in Connecticut and the oldest stone house in New England

- Location within Connecticut Location within the United States
- Location: 248 Old Whitfield Street, Guilford, Connecticut
- Coordinates: 41°16′39.89″N 72°40′35.04″W
- Built: 1639
- Architectural style: American Colonial
- Part of: Guilford Historic Town Center (ID76001988)
- NRHP reference No.: 72001327

Significant dates
- Added to NRHP: November 27, 1972
- Designated NHL: September 25, 1997
- Designated CP: July 6, 1976

The Henry Whitfield House is a historic house located in Guilford, Connecticut, one-half mile south of the town green. Construction began in 1639, when a group of English Puritans, including Reverend Henry Whitfield and his family, entered into an agreement with the Menunkatuck band of the Quinnipiac tribe and renamed the area Guilford. It is the oldest house in Connecticut and the oldest stone house in New England. It also served as a fort to protect the community with its massive stone walls. Henry Whitfield was a Puritan minister who had come from England to flee religious persecution, and the settlers built the house for him. It was remodeled in 1868 and opened to the public in 1899 as the Henry Whitfield State Museum, the first Connecticut state museum. It was restored in 1902–04 and again in the 1930s, and it was declared a National Historic Landmark in 1997. It was named a State Archeological Preserve in 2006.

== Construction ==
The first settlers of the Guilford colony began construction of their minister's home in September 1639, shortly after their arrival in the area. However, they had begun construction too late in the year, and winter weather prevented them from finishing anything more than half of the great hall and the north fireplace. By the summer of 1640, the settlers had completed the rest of the hall, the second floor, and the attic, and Whitfield and his family moved in.

Accounts of the construction state that the local Menunkatuck Indians aided the settlers in the construction of the house by transporting stone from nearby quarries to the building site on hand barrows. The walls of the house were made nearly two feet thick because there was so much stone available for construction. The original mortar used to cement the stones was composed of yellow clay and crushed oyster shell, a technique developed by the lack of more conventional building materials. Inside the great hall, the "joists and rafters were hand-hewn oaken timbers; the inside partitions were formed by wide planks of pine or white wood joined with feathered edges."

== Purposes ==
The Whitfield House served primarily as the home for Henry Whitfield, Dorothy Shaeffe Whitfield, and their nine children. The house also served as a place of worship before the first church was built in Guilford, as a meetinghouse for colonial town meetings, as a protective fort for the settlers in case of attack, and as a shelter for travelers between the New Haven and Saybrook colonies. Today, it is a museum, a State Archeological Preserve, a National Historic Landmark, and a site listed on the National Register of Historic Places.

== Architecture ==
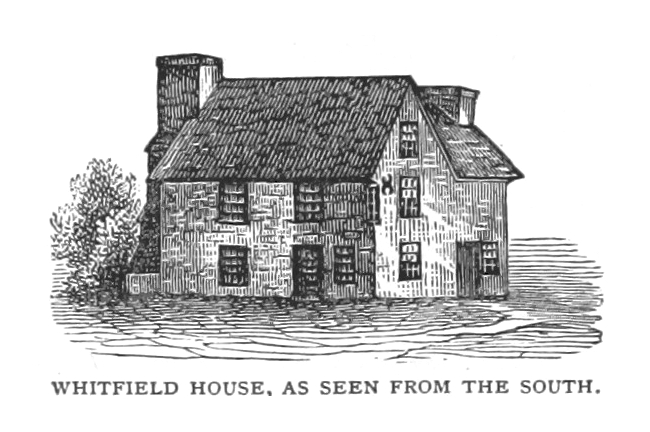
Seen from the South

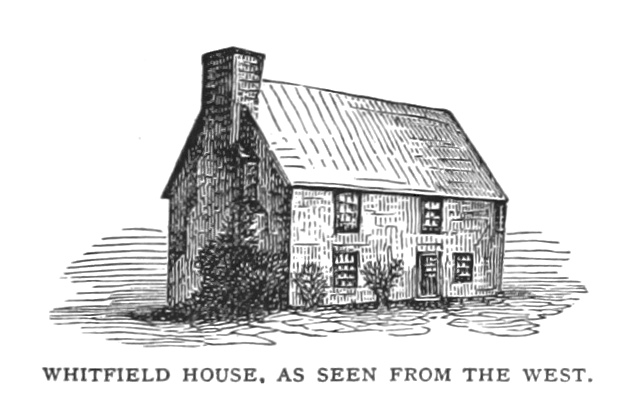
Seen from the West

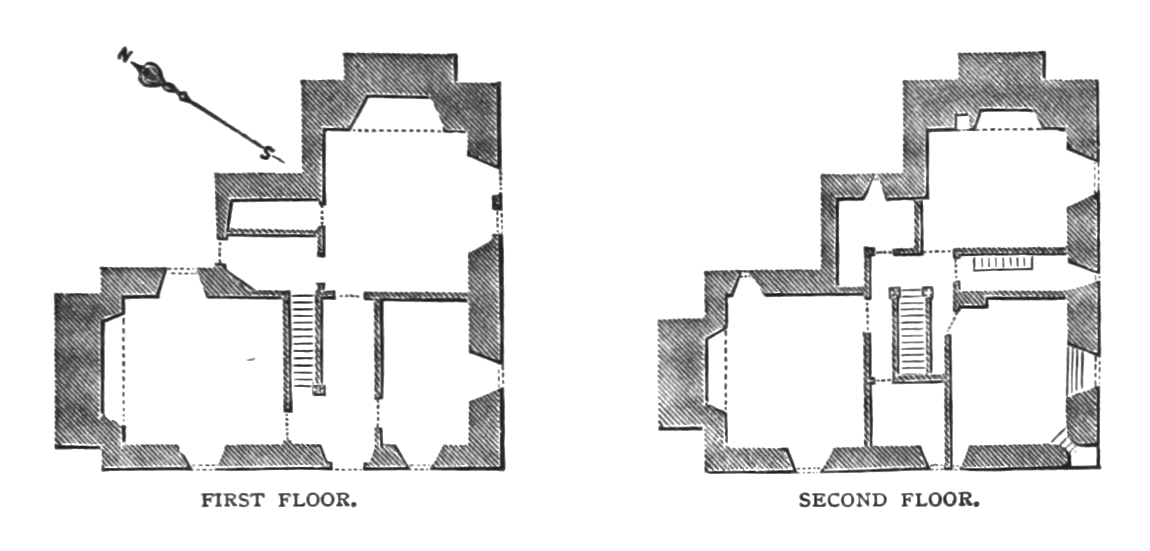
Floor plans

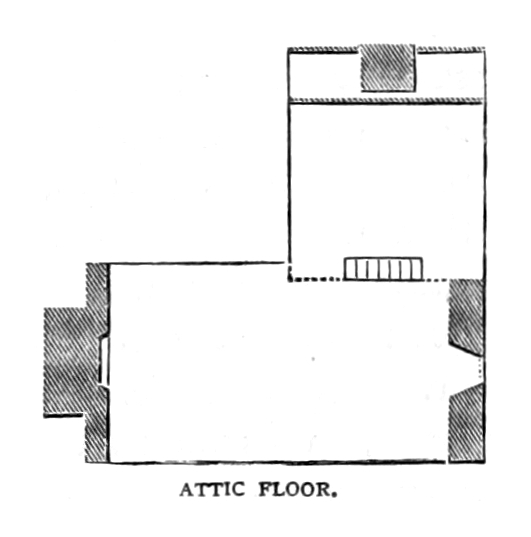
Attic floor

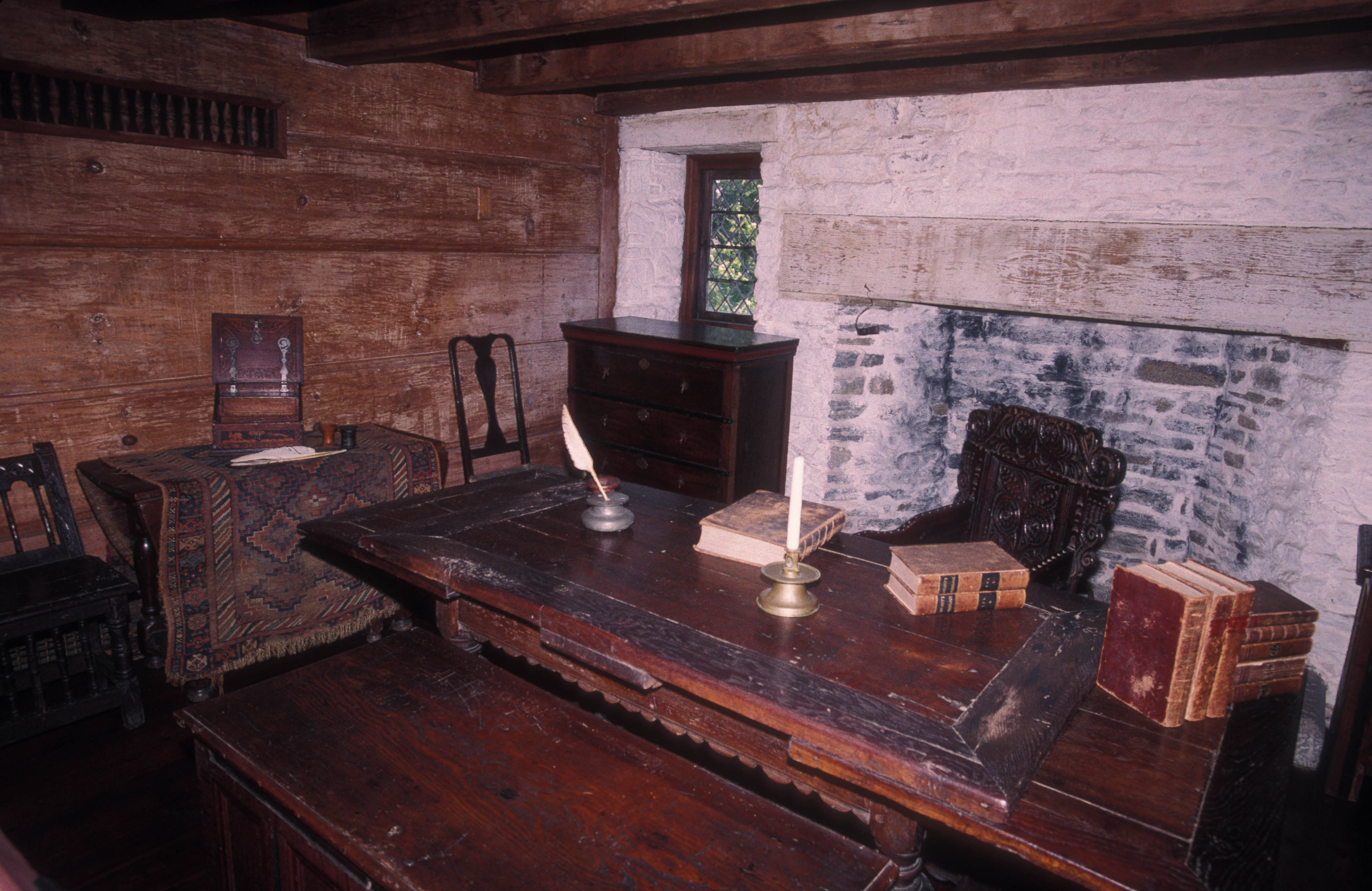
Interior view

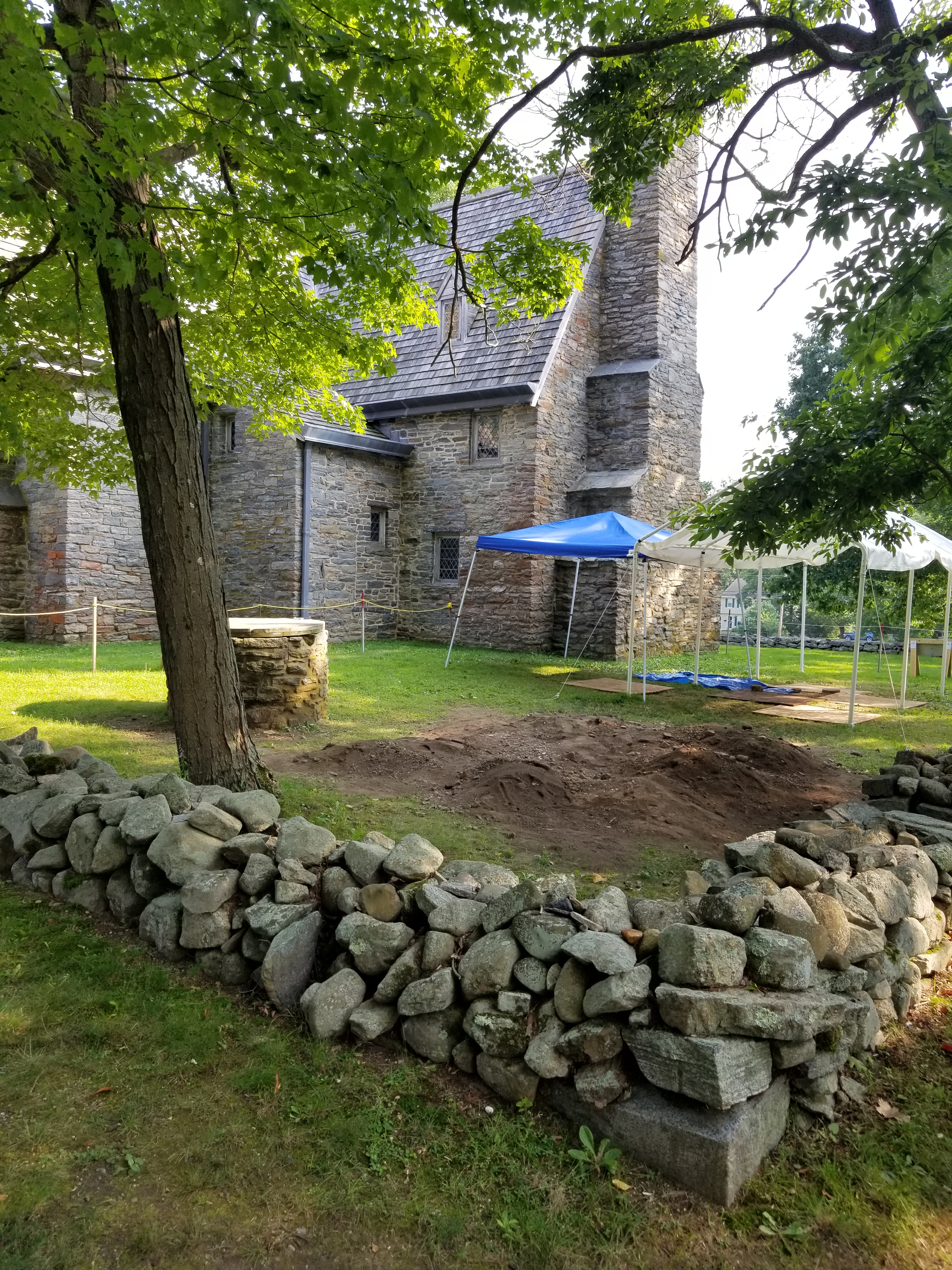
Archaeological dig adjacent to house

The architectural style of the Henry Whitfield house is unique for its time period and location. It is styled in the tradition of the estates of northern England and Scotland, rather than the lower English and London style found in the rest of New England. The settlers built large rooms, ignoring the fact that smaller rooms would be easier to heat. They also ignored the abundance of wood available to them to construct a home that was easily heated yet still sturdy.

The original floor plan of the house included a kitchen and great hall (which could be divided by partitions into two separate rooms) on the first floor, a stair tower leading to the second floor, three bedroom chambers on the second floor, and a small attic above the chambers. The great hall was probably the most used room in the house. It is 33 feet long and 15 feet wide and was built in a perpendicular ell to the rest of the house. This was the room used for church services, town meetings, feasts, and housing travelers. The Whitfield family slept on the second floor, with the room directly above the kitchen used for the younger children because it was kept the warmest in the winter by the rising heat from the kitchen fireplace. The original roof had a sixty degree pitch, though it has been steepened during the house's various restorations. It was constructed with six fireplaces, the largest of which is ten feet four inches across and is positioned on the north end of the great hall. This fireplace remains mostly unchanged today, other than the addition of an oak mantel and some masonry. The smaller five have been remodeled several times since their construction.

== Henry Whitfield ==
Henry Whitfield was one of Guilford's founders and its first minister. He was born sometime between June 8 and October 1, 1592 in Greenwich in the English county of Kent. His father Thomas Whitfield was wealthy and influential during the reigns of James I and Queen Elizabeth, and he was an eminent lawyer in the courts of Westminster in London. Henry's mother Mildred Manning was descended from the family of Geoffrey Chaucer.

Henry Whitfield attended New College, Oxford, where he befriended George Fenwick; Fenwick became one of the founders of Saybrook Colony near New Haven Colony. Whitfield initially studied law after graduation, but he found it undesirable and promptly changed his focus to ministry studies. He was ordained a minister of the Church of England in 1618 and soon took up the post of vicar of St. Margaret's Church in Ockley, Surrey, where he remained for the next 18 years. Contemporaries noted that people throughout the surrounding countryside converged to hear his sermons. He was known for being dignified, courteous, scholarly, eloquent, and gentle.

Whitfield married Dorothy Sheafe who was the daughter of Dr. Edmund Sheafe from the county of Kent. Henry and Dorothy had nine children together. It is believed that three of the children died before reaching adulthood. Under the rule of King Charles I, the Church of England persecuted Separatists and Puritans who opposed the liturgy and ecclesiastical structure of the English church. Whitfield's sympathies shifted to the Puritan movement following persecutions ordered by Archbishop William Laud. Laud established a network to spy on and break up nonconforming religious groups.

In 1633, Whitfield hosted a meeting in his home in Ockley to persuade John Cotton and Thomas Hooker to conform to Laud's dictates so that they could keep their positions in the church. Ultimately, Whitfield did not conform to the dictates and religious ceremonies required by Laud, and he published a book of religious persuasion and instruction entitled “Helps to Stir Up Christian Duties.” He was censured as a dissident by the High Commission Court in 1638, so he resigned from his post in Ockley.

In early 1639, Whitfield sold his estate and established plans to emigrate to America with his family and followers. He was an itinerant preacher, so he met many younger nonconformists who agreed with his teachings. He recruited 25 families, mostly farmers from Surrey and Kent, to travel to the New Haven colony. Also among the party was Edward Jones, an indentured builder who agreed to help the newcomers construct houses for three years in exchange for passage. Dorothy Whitfield's brother Jacob Sheafe and two of her sisters emigrated with them.

Upon arrival in June 1639, Whitfield consulted Fenwick and Reverend John Davenport, founder of the New Haven Colony, and purchased land from the Quinnipiac tribe halfway between the New Haven and Saybrook colonies. Quinnipiac land stretched from New Haven on the west to Madison on the east and north to Meriden. Each party in the land transaction was ignorant of each other's culture.

Whitfield and his followers started establishing the Guilford colony in September. They began constructing his house, although it was not finished until the following spring due to winter weather conditions. In the early years of the Guilford colony, Whitfield served as both the minister and community leader, delivering sermons, conducting marriage ceremonies, and settling civil disputes. In 1641, the colony of New Haven expanded to include Guilford as well as several other settlements under the New Haven General Court's jurisdiction. New Haven was officially recognized as a colony by the English Parliament under Oliver Cromwell. Beginning in 1642, several leaders of the New Haven Colony returned to England to join in the political struggles over religious freedom.

By the late 1640s, Whitfield was reconsidering whether to remain in the New World. Seven founding members of Guilford had died between 1646 and 1648, most of them young men. Political conditions in England had changed. Archbishop Laud represented King Charles I's unyielding religious policies, but he was arrested on charges of treason in 1641 and executed on January 10, 1645. By 1650, England had become more tolerant of religious differences and more attractive to New Englanders who were wearying of life in the wilderness. Many prominent citizens and clergymen were returning to England. Whitfield received invitations to return and he told his parish that he intended to leave. A public meeting was held in Guilford on February 20, 1649. Whitfield's reasons for wishing to leave were read in public. The assembly approved of inducements to encourage him to remain, including increasing his salary and exempting his two sons from guard duty (night watches to protect the town) for one year. In the end, Whitfield decided to return in spite of his flock's objections.

George Hubbard observed that Whitfield was not suited to life in the wilderness. His fragile body could not handle the harsh winters and physical labor, and these factors affected his health. Hubbard noted that Whitfield lost money on the Guilford venture, and colleagues in England were urging him to return. Whitfield left the colony and his followers on August 26, 1650. His son John accompanied him.

Dorothy and the majority of their children remained in Guilford. She continued to live in their stone house in Guilford and looked after their property. Three daughters were married in New England. Three children ultimately returned to England. Whitfield was reinstated in the Church. He died in 1657 and was buried in Winchester Cathedral on September 17. The entirety of his estate was left to Dorothy who returned to England in 1659. She died in 1669.

== Owners and residents ==
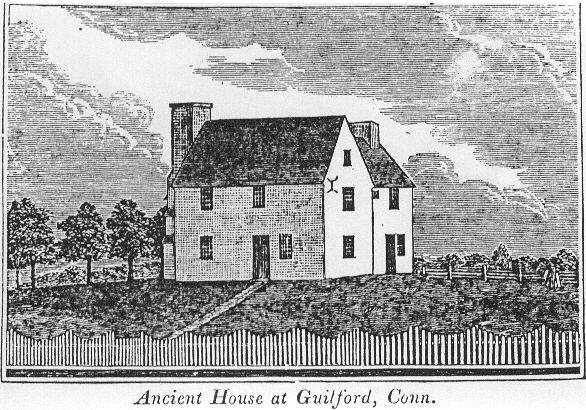
Whitefield House, pictured ca. 1836

The first residents of the house were Henry Whitfield, his wife, and their children, for whom the house was built. Throughout their occupancy, they extended their welcome to travelers, church-goers, and the rest of the citizens in the community. Henry Whitfield returned to England in 1650, but his wife Dorothy continued to live in the house, along with some of their children. Historical records suggest that John Winthrop the Younger, future Governor of Connecticut, expressed interest in purchasing the house, but he ended up moving to the New Haven Colony instead. Whitfield died in 1657, and the house was passed on to Dorothy. She returned to England in 1659, and the town of Guilford attempted to purchase the house as a grammar school for the settlement. The transaction never occurred because the town lacked sufficient funds. In September 1659, the house was sold to a London merchant named Major Robert Thompson. Thompson and his family remained in England throughout most of their ownership, which lasted over a century, renting the house to tenant farmers. The Thompson family sold the house to Guilford resident Wyllys Eliot on October 21, 1772, but Eliot sold it to Joseph Pynchon on November 6, 1772. Pynchon used the house as a summer home but was forced to flee back to England because of his loyalist sympathies at the onset of the American Revolution. He sold the house to Jasper Griffing on June 27, 1776, just a week before the signing of the Declaration of Independence. Griffing was a patriot from Long Island and a descendant of Guilford leader William Chittenden. The Griffing and Chittenden families owned the house for over a century, remodeling it in 1868. The Whitfield House became the property of the State of Connecticut on September 28, 1900, when Sarah Brown Cone sold it and the property for $8,500. The purchase was financed by "$3,500 from the State of Connecticut, $3,000 from the town of Guilford, between $500 and $1,000 from residents of Guilford, and as much from the members of the Connecticut Society of the Colonial Dames of America." It was transformed into a museum after several renovations and is now operated by the Connecticut Department of Economic and Community Development.

== Renovations ==
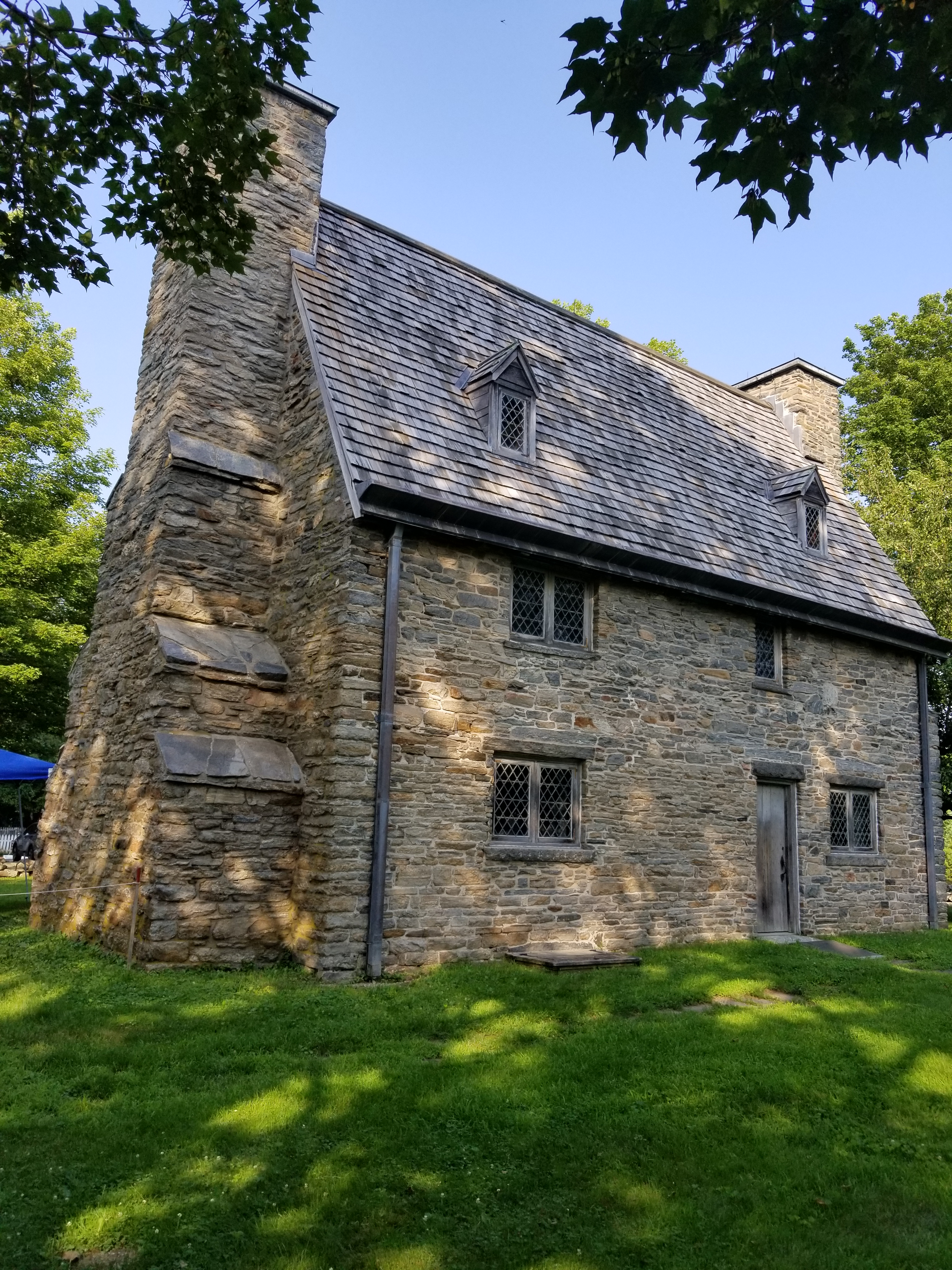
Restored house with two chimneys

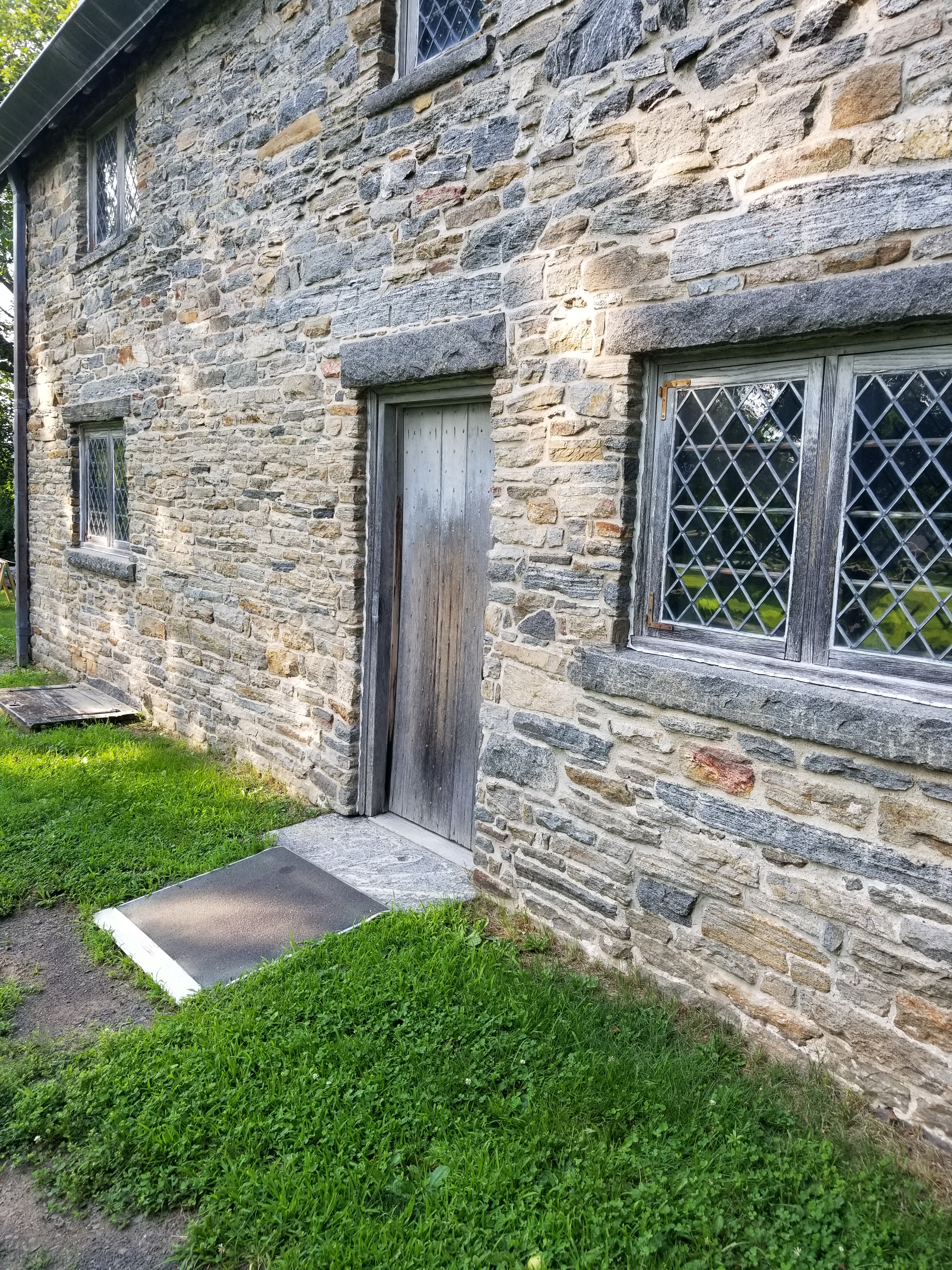
Repointed stone work at front entrance

Mary Chittenden remodeled the Whitfield House in 1868, using her inheritance from her late husband Henry Ward Chittenden. This initial renovation was directed by her son-in-law Henry D. Cone. The house's roof was beginning to cave in by 1868, and a large portion of the southern wall had collapsed. Several repairs were necessary in order to make the house habitable. During this time, much of the south wall was rebuilt, the south chimney was removed, the roof was rebuilt, and many of the interior walls were re-plastered. However, the house was not completely changed from its original state. Historical accounts from the Library of Congress state that "as much as half of the ancient wall was not disturbed, the larger part of that being north of the door." In addition, the original foundation remained unaltered.

The house as it appeared about the 1920s

The second major renovation occurred in 1902, shortly after the museum was opened, led by architectural historian Norman Isham. Isham's main purpose in the restoration was to make the house and museum attractive to visitors and suitable for tours. His renovation included a re-plastering and mortaring of the walls and ceilings, as well as the remodeling of the five smaller fireplaces of the house. Isham's restoration plan was based on what he stated to be "tradition, inherent reasonableness, and likeness to old English examples." His approach led to the criticism of many architectural experts, including the next renovator J. Frederick Kelly, who believed that Isham was more concerned with the aesthetics than the historical accuracy of the house.

The most extensive renovation occurred during the 1930s, directed by J. Frederick Kelly in order to conduct archeological and architectural analyses and to restore the house to its condition of 1639. Kelly had previous experience with the house through his conversion of one of the barns on the property to a caretaker's house in 1923. Kelly's restoration began with the reconstruction of the kitchen in 1930 and the rebuilding of the ell (the wing built perpendicular to the main house) in 1932. The external changes of the house included a steepening of the pitch of the roof, the construction of a chimney at the house's southern end, elimination of the stucco, and the creation of seventeenth century windows with diamond-shaped leaded glass panels. Interior restorations included the re-creation of a corner window facing the harbor, the restoration of the stair tower to the second floor, the rebuilding of the second floor (which had been essentially removed sometime during the 1700s), and the reconstruction of the partitions that had been used to separate the great hall into several rooms. The final cost of Kelly's restoration was $26,000, financed by the Federal government and individual patrons of the Colonial Dames of America, and it was completed on October 20, 1937.

== Museum ==
The Henry Whitfield House was formally opened as a museum in 1899, after the first official remodeling was completed, making it Connecticut's first state museum. The museum is operated by the Connecticut Department of Economic and Community Development. The creation of the museum reflected a trend toward nativism during the immigration influx in the early twentieth century. Some of the artifacts in the museum were found in the cellar, but many are not original to the house and were gathered from other historic sites of the same time period in order to show visitors what life was like for the early colonists of America. J. Frederick Kelly had also restored the house to the condition that it was in when it was built. On site, visitors are allowed to explore the house through either historian-guided or self-guided tours, as well as through interactive tours online at the museum's webpage. The museum gained national recognition when it was added to the National Register of Historic Places in 1972 and was declared a National Historic Landmark in 1997.

== See also ==
- Oldest buildings in America
- List of the oldest buildings in Connecticut
- List of sites administered by the Connecticut State Historic Preservation Office
- List of National Historic Landmarks in Connecticut
- National Register of Historic Places listings in New Haven County, Connecticut
