= Henry Jones of Oxfordshire =

English officer in the New Model Army

Henry Jones of Asthall Manor (died 1673), Oxfordshire was an officer in the New Model Army during the Interregnum. He transferred to the new small Royalist army of Charles II, serving as a Life Guard until he was dismissed after becoming a Roman Catholic. With King Charles's blessing he raised an English regiment of horse (cavalry) known as English Regiment of Light Horse in France for the French Army of Louis XIV. He was killed in action at the siege of Maastricht.

== Early life ==
Henry Jones was the son of Rice Jones (died probably by 1644) and his wife Jane daughter of Giles Bray of Harrington. (Note: "In 1612 Lenthall sold the manor to Rice Jones (d. 1615) and his son Rice, a minor. The younger Rice presumably came into possession in 1627 on achieving his majority and died probably by 1644. His son Henry was lord in 1654, when he made a conveyance probably in trust. He died in 1673 leaving a daughter, Frances, a minor, who in 1685 married Richard Lumley, Lord Lumley and from 1690 earl of Scarbrough. In 1687 they granted the manor apparently in trust, and in 1687–1688 sold several parcels including Stonelands and probably the manor house and some land. In 1688 they sold the manor, including land and quitrents, to Sir Edmund Fettiplace of Swinbrook, followed by more land in 1689".) (Note: "Jane Jones of Asthall, widow of Rice Jones the younger, was subsequently required to pay for ten months towards the maintenance of Gaunt House's new garrison".) (Note: "Rice Jones of Asthall; living 1634; mar. Jane da. of Giles Bray of Harrington in Com. Glouc. and had issue III. Sr. HENRY JONES of Asthall knt. will pr. 1673 (P.C.C.) had issue Frances bp. 26 Mar. 1666-7 1 Vis. Ox. p. 292".)

== Early military career ==
Jones (Note: "Sir Henry Jones, lord of Asthall Manor by 1654, fought for Oliver Cromwell in the late 1650s and was later a leading commander in Charles II's army, dying at the siege of Maastricht in 1673".) was a captain in, or possibly was major of, John Humphrey's regiment of foot in Barbados and Jamaica in 1655 and 1656. He was lucky to survive service in the West Indies.

== Battle of the Dunes ==
Jones and another officer, Colonel Drummond, accompanied Lord Fauconberg (a son-in-law of the Lord Protector Oliver Cromwell). Jones volunteered to join Sir William Lockhart's Brigade which fought alongside the French army at the siege of Dunkirk and at the Battle of the Dunes on 4 June 1658. (Note: Colonel Drummond was a Scottish officer who served in the English Army—some sources state Drummond was Major General. At the Battle of the Dunes, according to Edmund Ludlow's account it was Drummond on seeing the Lockhart's regiment having pursued the Spanish too far, rode up to the French horse, "and by reproaching them with treachery and negligence, procured a party of horse" to relieve the hard pressed English, and upon whose arrival "the English took fresh courage, renewed their attack, and killed a great number of the enemy". In this engagement Drummond had one horse shot from under him, and after remounting with difficulty, was pushed off by a pike, but he survived battle unharmed. His report to General George Monck is one of the primary sources of information about the battle and the gallant actions of Jones. Drummond was mortally wounded just over a week later when on 13 June 1658 (O.S.) as he led a storming party that captured an outlying "work" that command much of Dunkirk. He was "shot in the belly" and at first it was hoped that the wound was not fatal, but the expectation was that he would die; he did so on 28 June (O.S.).)

At the Battle of the Dunes Jones was attached to Lockhart's New Model Army regiment. The regiment was under the command of Lieutenant-Colonel Roger Fenwick when it attacked veteran Spanish soldiers ensconced on top of 150 feet (46 m) dune (sand-hill). The sides of the dune were so steep that attacking English had to scramble up on hands and knees. The English, after two volleys and push of pike, drove the Spanish from the crest of the dune and then pursued them down the far side. They were then in turn attacked by Anglo-Spanish cavalry who were unable to break the English formation and were themselves then driven off by French cavalry. By then all the regimental officers were either dead, or wounded. (Note: The performance of the Regiment won the red coated English Army renown throughout Europe.) Jones himself had been, shot through the shoulder and wounded in two other places, but this did not deter him from seizing a loose French cavalry horse and joining the French cavalry in the counter-attack on the Anglo-Spanish cavalry. However, Jones pursued the enemy too far and was captured.

Jones had displayed such valour in this action that on his release from a short captivity (he was part of a prisoner exchange), he was dubbed a knight bachelor by Oliver Cromwell on 17 July 1658 (this honour, like all Protectorate honours, passed into oblivion at the Restoration in May 1660), and was promoted to the lieutenant-colonelcy of John Hewson's infantry regiment.

Hampton Court, July 17.—His Highness [Oliver Cromwell] hath been pleased ... to confer the honor of Knighthood upon Henry Jones, Esq. a gentleman that hath given more then ordinary proofs of high courage in several services; particularly in the late battle near Dunkirk, where, as a volunteer, he performed service on foot, along with that gallant Gentleman Lieutenant-Colonel Roger Fenwick (who sustaining the first fury of the enemy, received his death's-wound, and lies asleep in the bed of honor) in which action the said volunteer was also wounded; and afterwards mounting himself he struck in with the French horse, and among them did farther service against the enemy; whereby he stands a noble example to the young gentry of England.

— Mercurius Politicus, July 15–22.

== Restoration ==
At the Restoration, he found his way into a lieutenant's commission in Lord Hawley's troop in the Royal Horse Guards, probably through the patronage and influence of George Monck and Sir William Lockhart. By 1665 he had risen to captain.

== Recusancy ==
In September 1667, Parliament passed an act that forbade Roman Catholics from being officers in the English Army. On the 26th of that month, all Roman Catholics officers were dismissed. Charles II recognised that many of the dismissed officers, or their fathers, had been devoted to the Royalist cause during the English Civil War and Interregnum. Appreciative of the loyalty they had shown, he made arrangements for these officers to enter service of the French Army, in Sir George Hamilton's regiment. Jones was one of those who left England for service abroad - reportedly, he converted to Roman Catholicism some time before the act of Parliament. He may have initially gone to Spain, but then became the lieutenant of Sir George Hamilton's Troop of English Gens d'Armes in the French army. However, he retained his troop in the Royal Horse Guards whilst in France.

== Regiment of Light Horse, and death ==
In 1671 Jones obtained permission to expand the Gens d'Armes into a full-sized light cavalry regiment under his own command. The regiment known as Sir Henry Jones's Regiment of Light Horse or the English Regiment of Light Horse in France was about 500 strong. Jones was its first colonel and Ferdinando Lyttelton its first lieutenant-colonel. Jones tried to recruit men from his own troop in the Royal Horse Guards; much to his annoyance, there were few volunteers. Jones was killed by a bullet through the throat whilst he was attending the Duke of Monmouth at the siege of Maastricht in 1673.

== Family ==
Jones married Frances, daughter of Henry Belasyse (1604–1647). They had a daughter and sole heir: Frances (born March 1667), who married Richard, Viscount Lumley.
