= Thomas Sheafe =

English Canon (died 1639)

Thomas Sheafe D.D. (d. 12 December 1639) was an English Canon who served as Canon of Windsor from 1614 to 1639.

== Family ==
He was the son of Thomas Sheafe, clothier of Cranbook in Kent. He married firstly to Mary Wilson, by whom at least, his daughter Dorothy who married the minister, Henry Whitfield.

His son, Revd Thomas Sheafe MD FRCP, was Gulstonian lecturer in 1641, of Binfield, Berkshire.

== Career ==
He was King's Scholar at Eton College and then educated at King's College, Cambridge where he graduated BA in 1585, MA in 1588 BD in 1595 and DD in 1606.

He was appointed:

- Rector of Welford and Withambrook, Berkshire 1597

He was appointed to the ninth stall in St George's Chapel, Windsor Castle in 1614, a position he held until 1639.

== Publications ==
- Vindiciae Senectutis, or a Plea for Old Age. Published in London 1639.
