= Henry Whitfield (minister) =

Puritan minister (c.1590-c.1657)

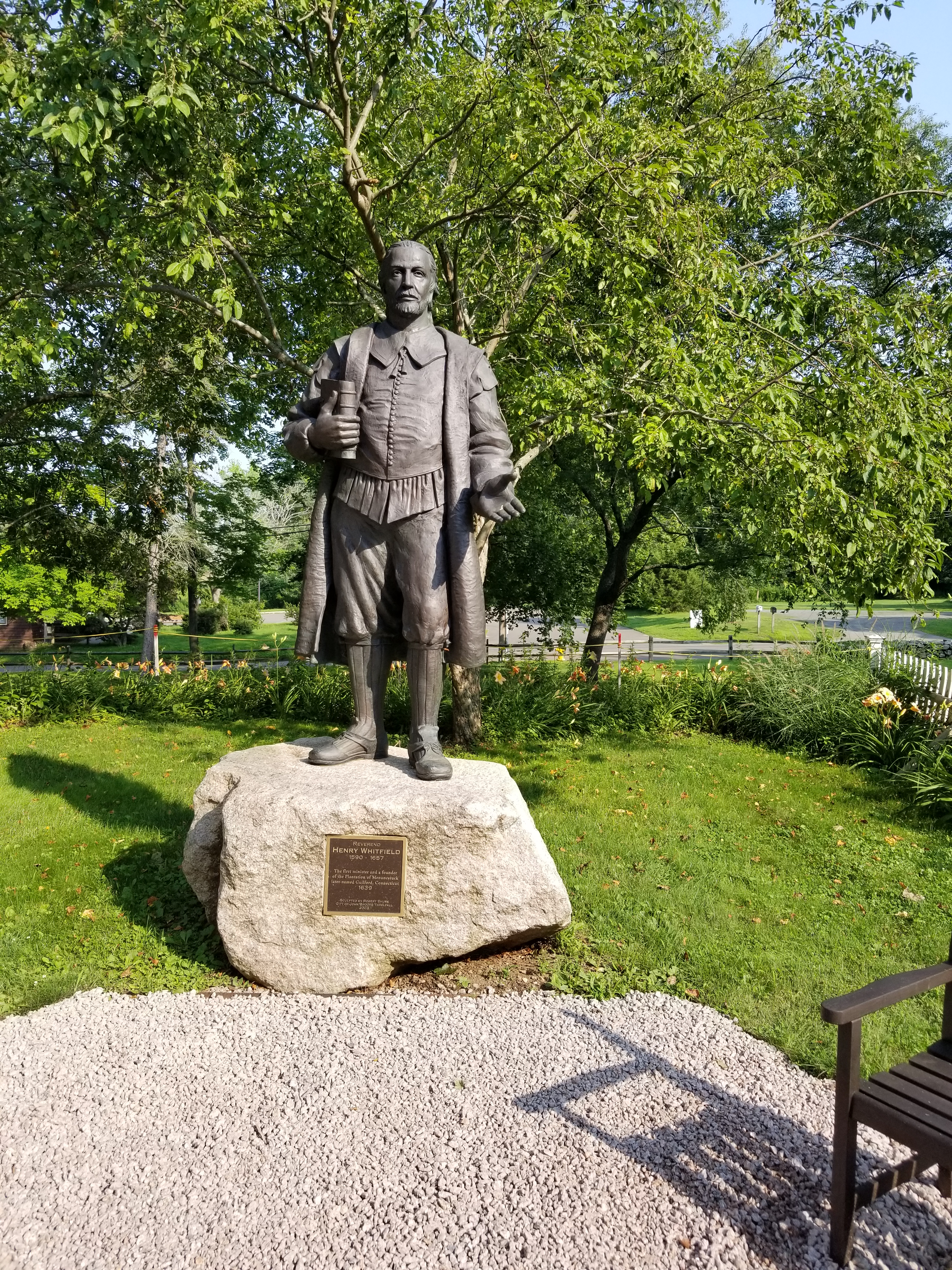
Statue of Whitfield at Henry Whitfield State Museum in Guilford, Connecticut

Coat of Arms of Henry Whitfield

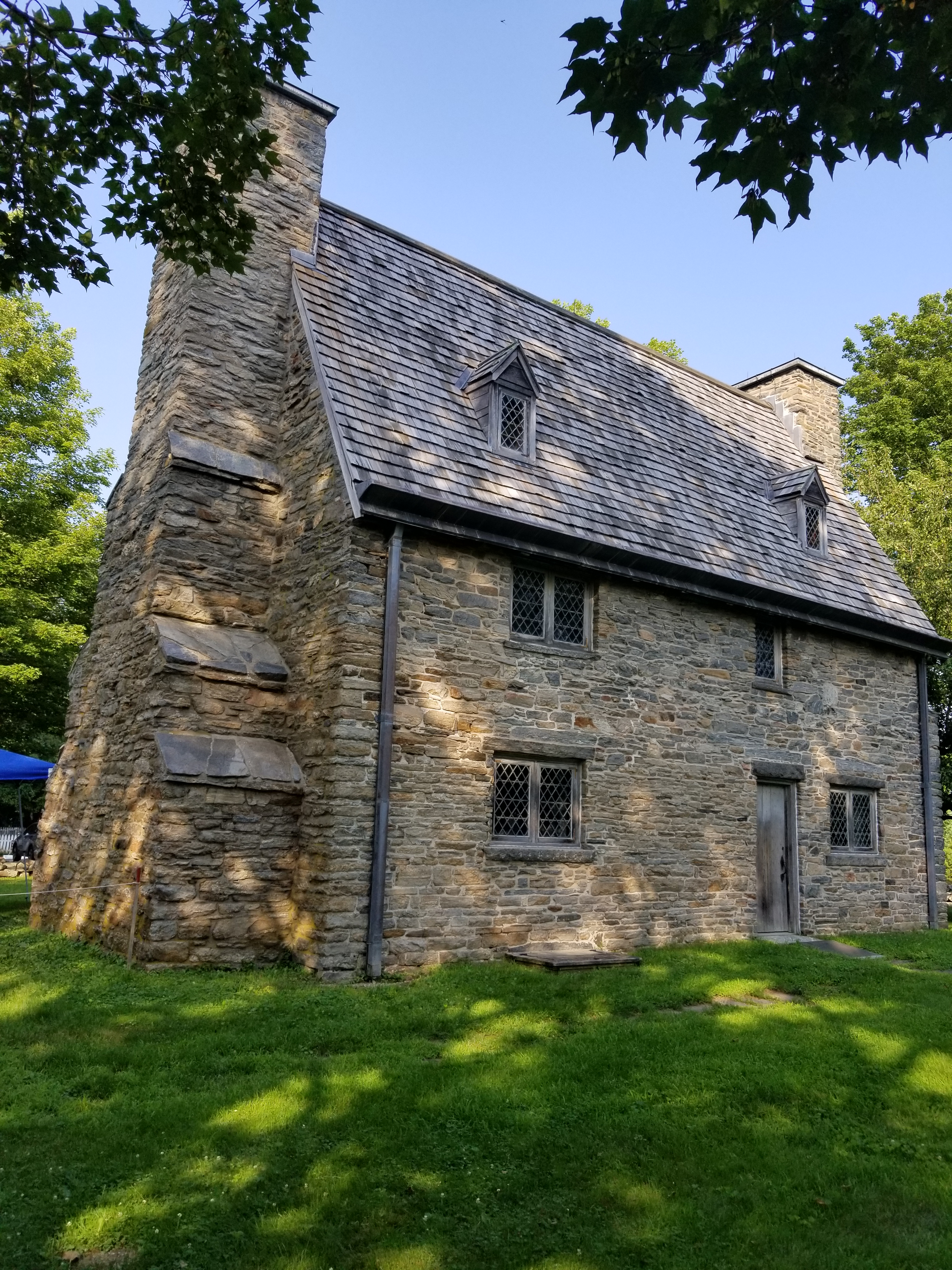
Henry Whitfield State Museum in Guilford, Connecticut

Henry Whitfield (c.1590-c.1657) was a Puritan minister who was a founder of Guilford, Connecticut and the first pastor there. His house, the Henry Whitfield House (c. 1639), is one of the oldest surviving American houses.

Henry Whitfield was born in Wadhurst, England around 1590 and attended Oxford University. He left the established Church of England and joined the Puritans and Independents as a pastor. He married Dorothy, daughter of Thomas Sheafe, by his first wife Mary Wilson (contract dated 1617). He migrated to New Haven, Connecticut in 1639 and signed the Guilford Covenant creating the town of Guilford on what was then called Menuncatuck with a deed from Wequash Cooke. Construction of his fortified stone house the Henry Whitfield House began around 1639 with assistance from the local Native Americans, and it is now the oldest stone house in the original thirteen states. Although Whitfield's family remained in Connecticut, Whitfield himself returned to England in 1650 died in Winchester in 1657.
