= Roger Fenwick (Roundhead) =

Roger Fenwick (1632–1658) was an English lieutenant-colonel in the New Model Army who was mortally wounded while leading his regiment at the Battle of the Dunes (1658). (Note: There was an English Colonel Fenwick who distinguished himself in the Irish wars called Roger Fenwick. "He appears to have ceome to Ireland with a regiment of foot about November 1646, and was killed at the battle of Scariffhollis on 21 June 1650.) (Note: Different sources describe him as a "Colonel of Horse" (cavalry) or as a Lieutenant-Colonel in Lockhart's regiment of foot and in acting command of the regiment at the Battle of the Dunes. The latter is the description used in a contemporary newspaper quoted in this article.)

== Biography ==
Fenwick was born on 18 March 1632. He was the son of Edward Fenwick of Staunton and his wife Sarah Nevill of Cheat, Yorkshire.

He was Lieutenant-Colonel of Lockhart's New Model Army regiment at the battle of the Dunes fought on 4/14 July 1658. He led Lockhart's regiment in an attack up the 150 feet (46 m) dune (sand-hill) which was defended by veteran Spanish soldiers, and the sides of which were so steep that attacking English had to scramble up on hands and knees. The English after two volleys and push of pike managed to drive the Spanish from the hill and then pursued them down the far side. They were then in turn attacked by cavalry who were unable to break the English formation and were themselves then driven off by French cavalry. All but two of the officers in the regiment that took part in the storming of the sand-hill were killed or wounded with Captain Henry Jones who had volunteered to accompany the regiment into battle taken prisoner. The performance of the Regiment won the English Army renown throughout Europe. A contemporary newspaper reported that:

Lieutenant-Col. Roger Fenwick, a gentleman of high courage and worth, who led the first forces up the sand-hill against the enemy, and notwithstanding the great advantages the enemies had in that place, did by his valour and gallant example, contribute very much to that great victory, is dead of his wounds, dying at Mardike the very day that the English took possession of Dunkirk, to which place his corpse is to be carried and will be honorably interred in the cathedral of that town.

— Mercurius Politicus, 17–24 June 1658.

== Literature ==
In his A poem on the death of his late Highness the Lord Protector, Andrew Marvell mentions Fenwick and the battle of the Dunes suggesting the victory was gained with the help of the Lord Protector Oliver Cromwell's prayers:

And where the shady mountain Fenwick scaled.
The sea between, yet hence his prayer prevailed.

== Sources cited ==
- Bulloch, Joseph Gaston Baillie (1901), A History and Genealogy of the Habersham Family, The R. L. Bryan company, p. 68
- Davis, Paul K. (1999), 100 Decisive Battles: From Ancient Times to the Present (illustrated, reprint ed.), Oxford University Press, p. 225, ISBN 9780195143669
- Firth, C.H. (1909), The last years of the Protectorate, vol. 2, London, New York: Longmans, Green, pp. 192–199
- Firth, C.H. (June 1926), "The Dictionary of National Biography", Historical Research, 4 (10): 48–61, doi:10.1111/j.1468-2281.1926.tb00412.x
- Historical Society of Pennsylvania (1925), The Pennsylvania Magazine of History and Biography, 49, Publication Fund of the Historical Society of Pennsylvania: 158
- Marvell, Andrew (2003), "A poem on the death of his late Highness the Lord Protector", in Smith, Nigel (ed.), The Poems of Andrew Marvell (illustrated, annotated ed.), Pearson Education, p. 309, ISBN 9780582077706
- Thurloe, John (1742), Birch, Thomas (ed.), A Collection of the State Papers of John Thurloe ...: 1658 to 1660, vol. 7, executor of F. Gyles, p. 158
