= National Register of Historic Places listings in Middletown, Connecticut =

This is a list of properties and historic districts in Middletown, Connecticut that are listed on the National Register of Historic Places. There are 36 in the city, which is a large portion of all NRHP listings in Middlesex County. There are 89 others in the county, listed here.

The Middletown listings are:

Contents: Counties and municipalities in Connecticut

Fairfield (city of Bridgeport | town of Greenwich | city of Stamford) | Hartford (city of Hartford | town of Southington | town of West Hartford | town of Windsor) | Litchfield | Middlesex (city of Middletown) | New Haven (city of New Haven) | New London | Tolland | Windham

This National Park Service list is complete through NPS recent listings posted August 14, 2026.

== Current listings ==
	Name on the Register	Image	Date listed	Location	City or town	Description
1	Alsop House	Alsop House	October 6, 1970 (#70000686)	301 High Street; 41°33′30″N 72°39′22″W	Middletown	Stately mansion built in "Greek-Tuscan Italianate" style in 1838-39, now owned by Wesleyan University. Designated a National Historic Landmark in 2009.
2	Arrawanna Bridge	Arrawanna Bridge	September 29, 2004 (#04001092)	Berlin Street at the Coginchaug River; 41°33′46″N 72°40′00″W	Middletown	An early reinforced concrete bridge, of elegant open spandrel design, blocked from use and deteriorating as of 2004 nomination.
3	Beman Historic District		June 9, 2026 (#100013098)	Cross Street, Knowles Avenue and Vine Street; 41°33′09″N 72°39′40″W	Middletown	
4	Broad Street Historic District	Broad Street Historic District	August 25, 1988 (#88001319)	Roughly bounded by High, Washington, Broad and Church Streets; 41°33′29″N 72°39′10″W	Middletown	
5	Church of the Holy Trinity and Rectory	Church of the Holy Trinity and Rectory	August 14, 1979 (#79002615)	381 Main Street and 144 Broad Street; 41°33′40″N 72°39′06″W	Middletown	
6	Coite-Hubbard House	Coite-Hubbard House	December 20, 1978 (#78002846)	269 High Street; 41°33′26″N 72°39′20″W	Middletown	
7	Connecticut General Hospital for the Insane	Connecticut General Hospital for the Insane	August 29, 1985 (#85001920)	Silver Street East of Eastern Drive; 41°33′10″N 72°37′47″W	Middletown	
8	Connecticut Valley Hospital Cemetery	Connecticut Valley Hospital Cemetery	August 2, 2018 (#100002718)	South of junction of Silvermine Road & O'Brien Drive; 41°33′12″N 72°37′11″W	Middletown	
9	The Eclectic House	The Eclectic House	January 2, 2013 (#12001111)	200 High Street Wesleyan University; 41°33′18″N 72°39′15″W	Middletown	
10	Highland Historic District	Highland Historic District	June 28, 1982 (#82003770)	Atkins Street and Country Club Road; 41°34′05″N 72°44′16″W	Middletown	
11	Nehemiah Hubbard House	Nehemiah Hubbard House	May 11, 1982 (#82003771)	Laurel Grove Road and Wadsworth Street; 41°32′17″N 72°40′52″W	Middletown	
12	Main Street Historic District (Middletown)	Main Street Historic District (Middletown)	June 30, 1983 (#83001275)	Roughly Main Street between College and Hartford Avenue; 41°33′45″N 72°38′56″W	Middletown	
13	Metro South Historic District	Metro South Historic District	January 24, 1980 (#80004064)	Main and College Streets; 41°33′27″N 72°38′49″W	Middletown	
14	Middletown Alms House	Middletown Alms House	April 29, 1982 (#82003772)	53 Warwick Street; 41°32′56″N 72°39′09″W	Middletown	
15	Middletown South Green Historic District	Middletown South Green Historic District	August 12, 1975 (#75001922)	Union Park Area, on South Main, Crescent, Pleasant, and Church Streets; 41°33′21″N 72°38′56″W	Middletown	
16	Old Middletown High School	Old Middletown High School	August 23, 1985 (#85001826)	251 Court Street; 41°33′30″N 72°39′13″W	Middletown	
17	Jacob Pledger House	Jacob Pledger House	March 15, 1982 (#82003773)	717 Newfield Street; 41°34′43″N 72°40′22″W	Middletown	
18	Plumb House	Plumb House	December 1, 1978 (#78002848)	West of Middletown at 872 Westfield Street; 41°33′49″N 72°42′06″W	Middletown	
19	Russell Company Upper Mill	Russell Company Upper Mill	February 6, 1986 (#86000150)	475 East Main Street; 41°32′37″N 72°38′20″W	Middletown	
20	Edward Augustus Russell House	Edward Augustus Russell House	April 29, 1982 (#82004336)	318 High Street; 41°33′32″N 72°39′20″W	Middletown	Later ΚΝΚ fraternity, now offices of University Relations, Wesleyan University
21	Samuel Wadsworth Russell House	Samuel Wadsworth Russell House	October 6, 1970 (#70000688)	350 High Street; 41°33′37″N 72°39′20″W	Middletown	Greek revival mansion, designed by Ithiel Town; now part of Wesleyan University.
22	Saint Luke's Home for Destitute and Aged Women	Saint Luke's Home for Destitute and Aged Women	April 29, 1982 (#82004337)	135 Pearl Street; 41°33′42″N 72°39′18″W	Middletown	
23	Sanseer Mill	Sanseer Mill	July 31, 1986 (#86002101)	282 Main Street Extension; 41°32′59″N 72°38′31″W	Middletown	
24	Starr Mill	Starr Mill	December 14, 1993 (#93001379)	Junction of Middlefield Street and Beverly Heights; 41°32′55″N 72°41′28″W	Middletown	
25	Starr Mill Road Bridge	Starr Mill Road Bridge	December 10, 1993 (#93001344)	Starr Mill Road across the Cochinaug River; 41°32′56″N 72°40′38″W	Middletown	
26	Town Farms Inn	Town Farms Inn	May 4, 1979 (#79002614)	Spring Street at River Road; 41°33′28″N 72°37′20″W	Middletown	
27	U.S. Post Office	U.S. Post Office	April 12, 1982 (#82004338)	291 Main Street; 41°33′36″N 72°39′01″W	Middletown	
28	Wadsworth Estate Historic District	Wadsworth Estate Historic District	July 25, 1996 (#96000775)	15, 30, 33, 59, 73, and 89 Laurel Grove Road, Wadsworth Falls State Park, and 421 Wadsworth Street; 41°32′02″N 72°40′44″W	Middletown	
29	William and Mary Ward House		July 27, 2021 (#100006787)	45 Paterson Drive; 41°31′03″N 72°39′19″W	Middletown	
30	Washington Street Historic District	Washington Street Historic District	May 9, 1985 (#85001018)	Roughly bounded by Washington and Main Streets, Washington Terrace, and Vine Street; 41°33′41″N 72°39′31″W	Middletown	
31	Seth Wetmore House	Seth Wetmore House	September 10, 1970 (#70000689)	CT 66 and Camp Road; 41°33′09″N 72°41′19″W	Middletown	
32	Wilcox, Crittenden Mill	Wilcox, Crittenden Mill	December 3, 1986 (#86003349)	234-315 South Main Street, Pameacha, and Highlands Avenues; 41°32′54″N 72°39′19″W	Middletown	
33	Captain Benjamin Williams House	Captain Benjamin Williams House	December 1, 1978 (#09000143)	27 Washington Street; 41°33′47″N 72°38′54″W	Middletown	
34	Woodrow Wilson High School	Woodrow Wilson High School	August 6, 1986 (#86002270)	Hunting Hill Avenue and Russell Street; 41°32′25″N 72°38′57″W	Middletown	
35	Xi Chapter, Psi Upsilon Fraternity	Xi Chapter, Psi Upsilon Fraternity	November 4, 2009 (#09000870)	242 High Street; 41°33′24″N 72°39′18″W	Middletown	
36	YMCA of Northern Middlesex County	YMCA of Northern Middlesex County	January 23, 2023 (#100008583)	99 Union Street; 41°33′24″N 72°38′48″W	Middletown	

== See also ==
- National Register of Historic Places listings in Middlesex County, Connecticut
