= Broad Street Historic District (Middletown, Connecticut) =

Historic district in Connecticut, United States

- U.S. National Register of Historic Places
- U.S. Historic district
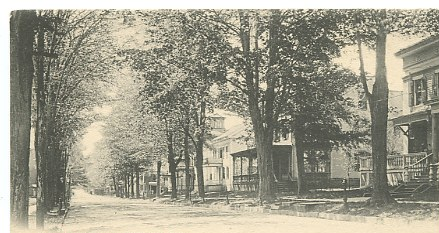
- Postcard view of Broad Street, 1905 postmark

- Location within Connecticut Location within the United States
- Location: Roughly bounded by High, Washington, Broad and Church Streets, Middletown, Connecticut
- Coordinates: 41.559°N 72.651°W
- Area: 27 acres (11 ha)
- Architect: Barzillai Sage
- Architectural style: Colonial, Federal
- NRHP reference No.: 88001319
- Added to NRHP: August 25, 1988

The Broad Street Historic District encompasses a well-preserved 19th-century residential area in Middletown, Connecticut, USA. Centered on Broad and Pearl Streets West of Main Street, the area was developed residential in response to local economic development intended to revitalize the city, whose port was in decline. The district includes the city's largest concentration of Greek Revival houses, and was listed on the National Register of Historic Places in 1988.

== Description and history ==
Middletown developed in the 18th century as a major port on the Connecticut River, but was in decline by the 1830s. Community leaders revitalized the local economy by founding Wesleyan University in 1831, and investing in textile and machine industries. The Wesleyan campus was laid out west of High Street, and the area between it and Main Street, originally open land used mainly for gardening, was developed residentially. Although there had been some houses built during the Federal period, the amount of housing stock in this area tripled between 1830 and 1850. The area was substantially built out by 1900, with only relatively minor additions and alterations since then.

The historic district is bounded on the north and south by Broad and Church Streets, and the west by High Street, and generally does not include buildings on those streets. Its Broad Street is its eastern boundary; it includes all of the houses on its west side, and only a few on the east side between Court and Washington Streets. College and Court Streets are the main cross streets in the district, and also including contributing properties.

== Broad Street Historic District inventory ==
According to the NRHP nomination, the district includes the following contributing properties:

- 9–11 Broad Street- 1820, Federal Style
- 15 Broad Street- 1880, Italianate
- 17 Broad Street- 1880, Italianate
- 23 Broad Street- c.1850, Queen Anne
- 25–27 Broad Street- c.1880, Queen Anne
- 51 Broad Street- c. 1850, Mid-19th century domestic, Henry Mansfield House
- Garage associated with 51 Broad Street
- 55 Broad Street- c.1910, Colonial Revival
- Garage associated with 55 Broad Street
- 59 Broad Street- c.1880, Queen Anne cross-gable
- Garage associated with 59 Broad Street
- 85 Broad Street- Queen Anne Style
- 89–91 Broad Street- 1840, Greek Revival, Crandall-Cornwell House
- 93–97 Broad Street- c.1840, Greek Revival, William Hubbard Atkins House
- 101 Broad Street- c.1840, Greek Revival, Enoch C. Ferre House
- Garage associated with 101 Broad Street
- 109 Broad Street- c.1845, Greek Revival, Samuel Stearns House
- 123 Broad Street- 1833 as Greek Revival church; Gothic Revival alteration 1875; modern additions 1970, 1986, Russell Library
- 138 Broad Street- 1883–1884, Stick Style, Joseph Elliott House
- 139 Broad Street- c.1860, Italianate, William Cooley, Jr. House
- Garage associated with 139 Broad Street
- 144 Broad Street- 1902–1903, Colonial Revival, Church of the Holy Trinity and Rectory. The rectory is also known as the Bishop Acheson House, and is now a retirement home operated by St. Luke's.
- 145 Broad Street- c.1880, Italianate
- Garage associated with 145 Broad Street
- 148 Broad Street- 1861, Victorian Italianate, Charles C. Hubbard House
- 151 Broad Street- c.1845, Greek Revival, Joseph Tobey House
- 148 College Street- 1822, Federal Style, First Randolph Pease House
- 151 College Street- 1832–1837, Greek Revival, Second Randolph Pease House
- 156–158 College Street- c.1880, 19th-century cross gable vernacular
- 157 College Street- 1840, Greek Revival
- 160 College Street- c.1775, Colonial, Hezekiah Hulbert Houser
- Garage associated with 160 College Street
- 161 College Street- 1840/1870, Greek Revival/Italianate
- Garage associated with 161 College Street
- 162–164 College Street- 19th-century vernacular
- Garage associated with 162-164 College Street
- 165 College Street- 1839 Greek Revival, c. 1880 Italianate alterations, Nathaniel Smith House
- 166–168 College Street- c. 1840 Greek Revival
- 169–171 College Street- 1839, Greek Revival, Davis Arnold House
- Garage associated with 169-171 College Street
- 170 College Street- c.1840, Greek Revival, Ezra Clark House
- Garage associated with 170 College Street
- 175 College Street- c.1825, Federal/Greek Revival,
- Garage associated with 175 College Street
- 180 College Street- c.1865, Italianate, Samuel T. Camp House
- 186 College Street- c.1870, Italianate
- Garage associated with 186 College Street
- 192 College Street- c.1880, Queen Anne
- Garage associated with 192 College Street
- 196 College Street- c.1870, Italianate, Theophilus Chandler House
- Garage associated with 196 College Street
- 200 College Street- c.1890, Queen Anne/Colonial Revival
- 201 College Street- c.1925, 20th-century institutional, Art Deco trim; condominiums 1982; Central School
- 208 College Street- 1765, moved to site c. 1830 from High Street, Colonial Gambrel, Joseph Hall House
- 212 College Street- 1886, 19th-century cross-gable
- Garage associated with 212 College Street
- 221–223 College Street- c. 1850/1870, Greek Revival/Italianate
- Garage associated with 221-223 College Street
- 229 Court Street- c. 1880, Queen Anne
- 234 Court Street- c. 1825–28, remodeled c. 1910, Colonial Revival, John & Susan Smith House
- 235 Court Street- c.1860, Greek Revival/Italianate
- 238 Court Street- c.1850, Greek Revival
- Garage associated with 238 Court Street
- 240–242 Court Street- c.1830, Georgian/Federal, Sage Russell House
- Garage associated with 240-242 Court Street
- 241 Court Street- c.1870, Mansard
- 250 Court Street- 1883–1884, Queen Anne/stick, J. Peters Pelton House
- Garage associated with 250 Court Street
- 251 Court Street- 1894–1896, Romanesque Revival converted to elderly housing 1980, Old Middletown High School (listed in its own right on the NRHP, reference number 85001826)
- 258 Court Street- 1880, Queen Anne, Eastlake detail, 1880
- Garage associated with 258 Court Street
- 264 Court Street- 1873, Mansard, Haskell-Vinal House
- Garage associated with 264 Court Street
- 267 Court Street- c.1870, Italianate
- 268 Court Street- c.1920, Jacobean Revival
- Garage associated with 268 Court Street
- 271 Court Street- c.1840, Greek Revival, Samuel Breese House
- Garage associated with 271 Court Street
- 279 Court Street- 1814, Federal, Oliver D. Beebe House
- 285 Court Street- 1911, Georgian Revival, Parsonage, First Congregational Church (since at least the 1970s, Wesleyan University English Department)
- (no number) Pearl Place- c.1860, 19th-century cross-gable
- 11 Pearl Street- 1874, Italianate, Camp/Wilcox House
- 12 Pearl Street- c.1850, Greek Revival cottage
- 15 Pearl Street- 1838, Greek Revival cottage, George E. Barrows House
- Garage associated with 15 Pearl Street
- 16 Pearl Street- 1839, Greek Revival cottage, Zebulon H. Baldwin House
- Garage associated with 16 Pearl Street
- 20 Pearl Street- c. 1840/1870, Greek Revival/Mansard,
- 24 Pearl Street- c. 1870, Mansard
- 28 Pearl Street- c. 1840, Greek Revival, Charles Brewer House
- Garage associated with 28 Pearl Street
- 59 Pearl Street- 1884, Queen Anne
- 60 Pearl Street- c. 1840, Greek Revival
- Garage associated with 60 Pearl Street
- 63 Pearl Street- c. 1900, Queen Anne/Colonial Revival
- Garage associated with 63 Pearl Street
- 64 Pearl Street- c. 1880, Queen Anne
- 66 Pearl Street- 1889, 19th-century domestic
- Barn/garage associated with 66 Pearl Street
- 70 Pearl Street- c. 1840, Greek Revival
- 73 Pearl Street- 1813, Federal, Starr/Russell House
- 74 Pearl Street- 1890, Queen Anne
- Garage associated with 74 Pearl Street
- 77 Pearl Street- 1900/1930 Queen Anne/Colonial Revival, Russell Carriage House
- 78 Pearl Street- 1886, James C. Hubbard House
- 80 Pearl Street- 1889, Queen Anne
- Garage associated with 80 Pearl Street
- 86 Pearl Street- 1889, Queen Anne
- Garage associated with 86 Pearl Street
- 90 Pearl Street- 1889, Queen Anne
- Garage associated with 90 Pearl Street

== Pictures ==
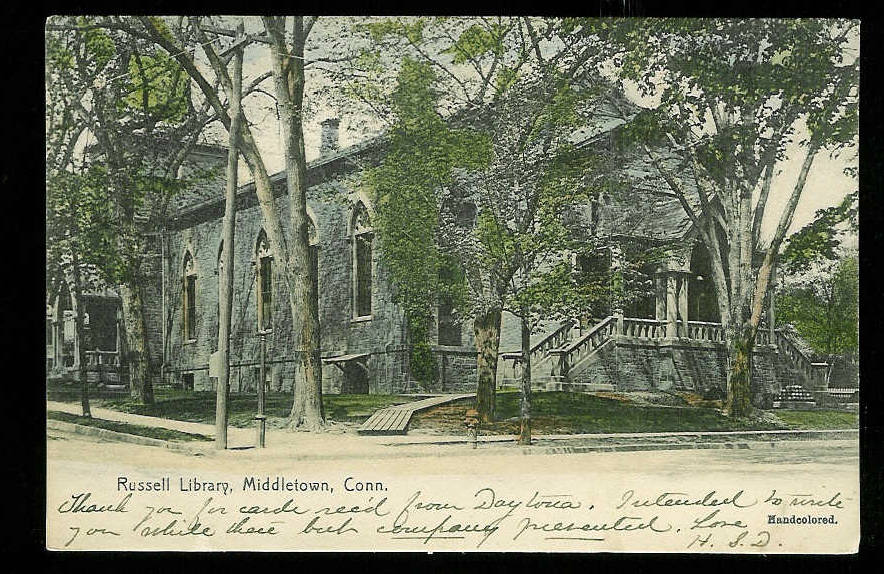
Russell Library, ca. 1906

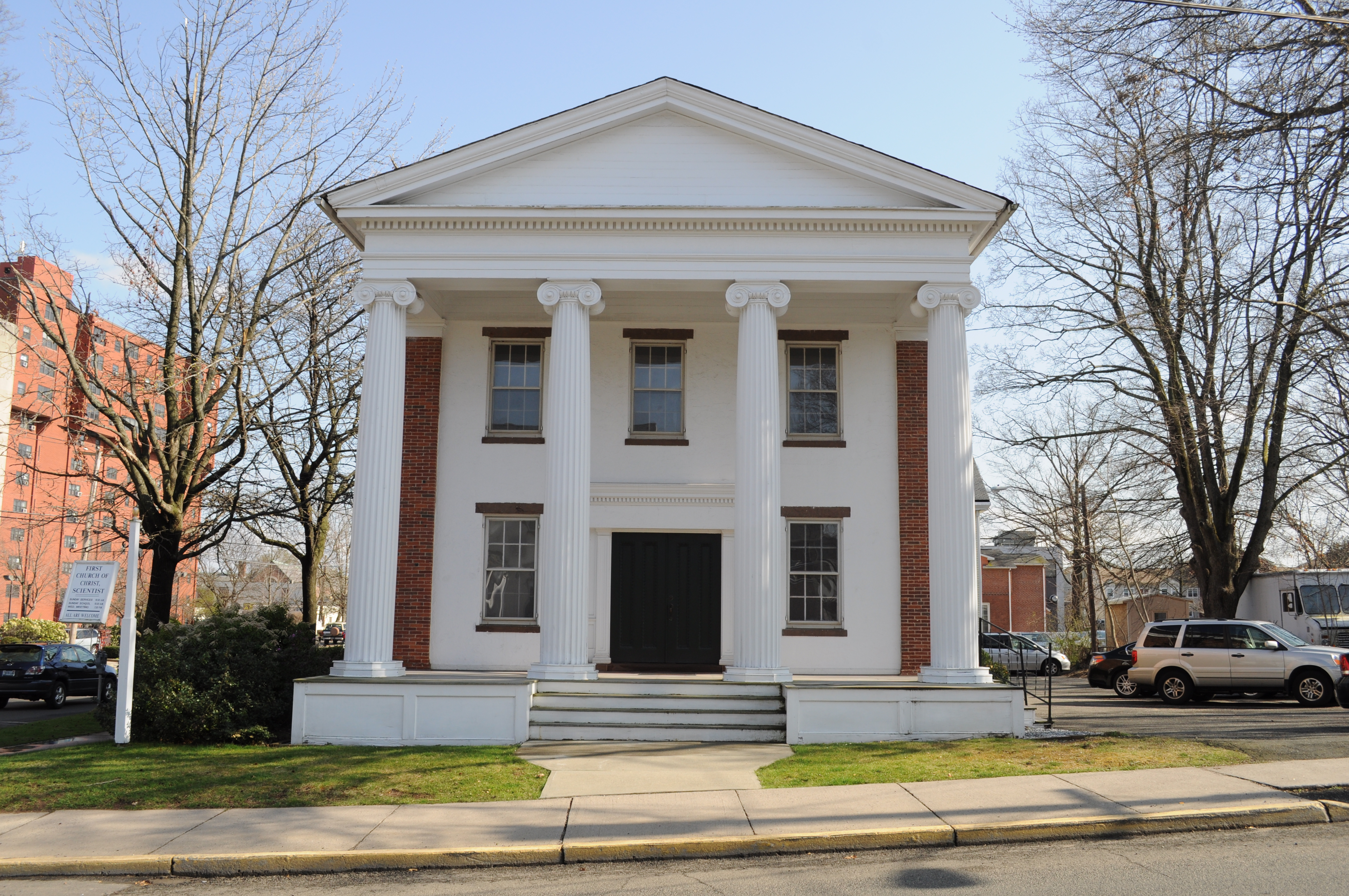
151 College Street, Second Randolph Pease House, now First Church of Christ Scientist, 2012

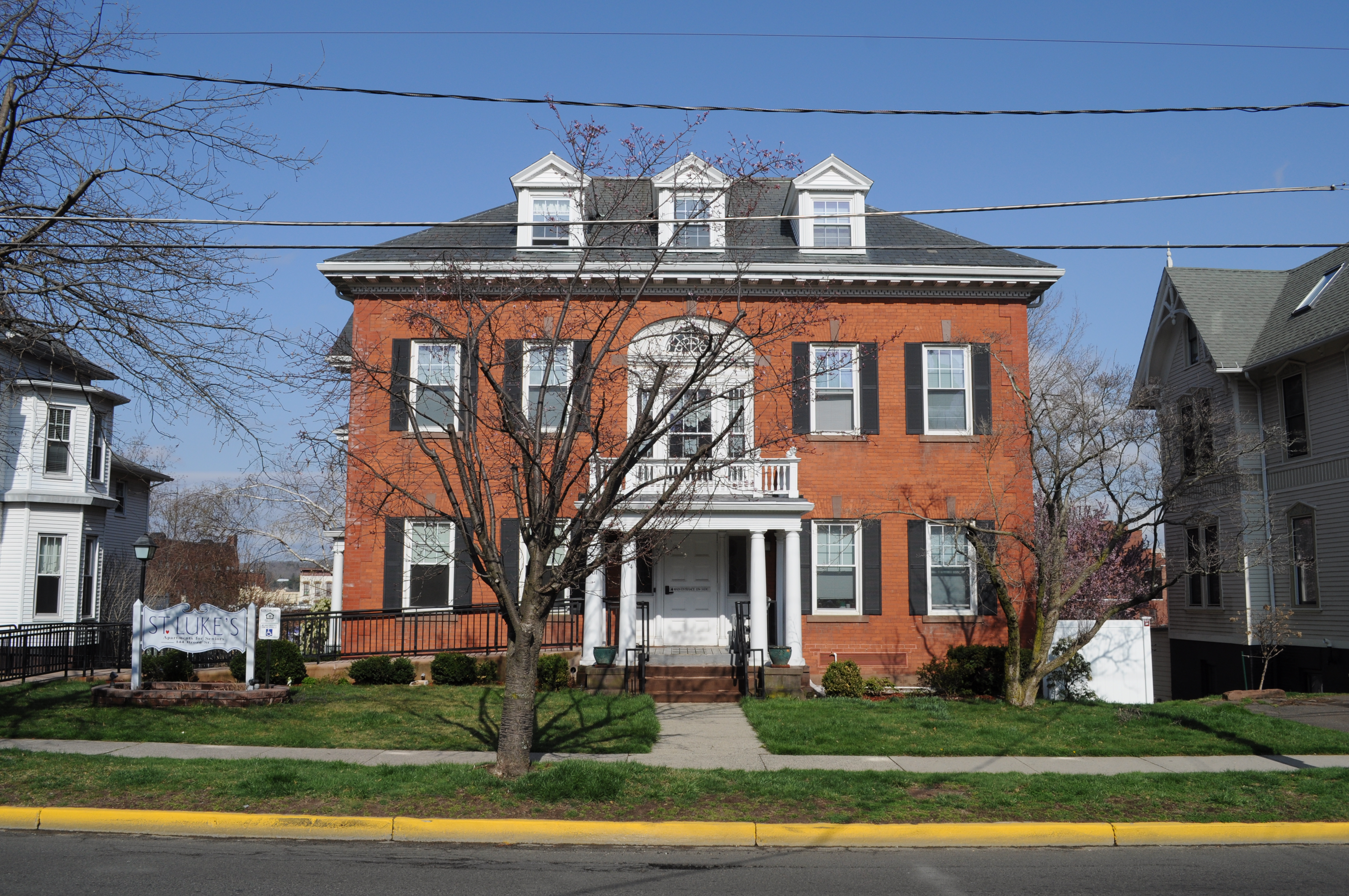
144 Broad Street, former rectory of the Church of the Holy Trinity, now elderly residential apartments

== See also ==
- National Register of Historic Places listings in Middletown, Connecticut
