= Wetmore House =

Wetmore House may refer to:

- Wetmore House (Piedmont, California), listed on the National Register of Historic Places in Alameda County, California
- Seth Wetmore House, Middletown, Connecticut, listed on the National Register of Historic Places in Middlesex County, Connecticut
- Wetmore House (Warren, Pennsylvania), listed on the National Register of Historic Places in Warren County, Pennsylvania
