= Pledger =

Pledger is a surname. Notable people with the surname include:

- Adrian Pledger (born 1976), American basketball player
- Alex Pledger (born 1987), New Zealand basketball player
- Bill Pledger (1852–1904), lawyer
- David Pledger, Australian artist
- Malcolm Pledger (born 1948), British Royal Air Force air chief marshal
- Orpheus Pledger (born 1993), Australian actor
- Shirley Pledger, New Zealand mathematician and statistician
- Warren Jackson Pledger, American molecular biologist

== See also ==
- Jacob Pledger House, a landmark in Connecticut
