= Russell Company Upper Mill =

- U.S. National Register of Historic Places
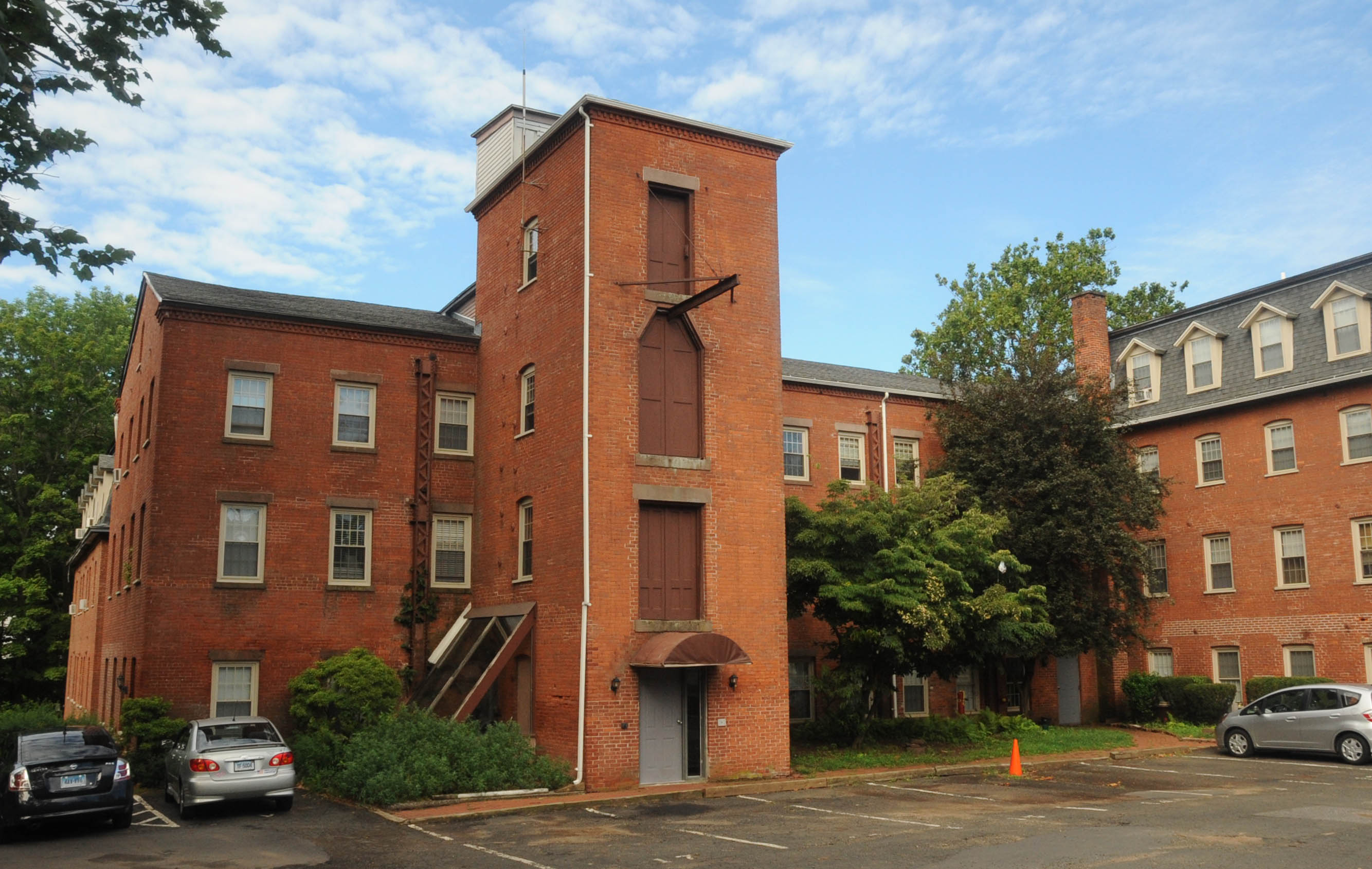
- In 2016

- Location within Connecticut Location within the United States
- Location: 475 East Main Street, Middletown, Connecticut
- Coordinates: 41°32′37″N 72°38′20″W
- Area: 1 acre (0.40 ha)
- Built: 1836
- NRHP reference No.: 86000150
- Added to NRHP: February 6, 1986

The Russell Company Upper Mill is an historic structure in Middletown, Connecticut, at the junction of Russell Street and East Main Street in South Farms, at the end of East Main Street's commercial and industrial development areas. Built in 1836, it is listed on the National Register of Historic Places. There is a small pond to the south. Small businesses border the street to the north, followed by the buildings of Russell Manufacturing Company, the area's most dominant feature. Russell Street crosses Sumner Brook nearby and ascends to a large residential district to the west. The mill is currently a condo-apartment complex.

== Significance ==
This factory was erected by the Russell Manufacturing Company in 1836, and is the oldest surviving textile mill building in the city. It was incorporated in 1834 by Samuel Russell, Samuel Hubbard. In 1841 it was the first site where elastic webbing was produced on power looms. By 1896, it manufactured a wide variety of woven products and was the nation's largest manufacturer of suspenders. Approximately 900 workers were employed in the company's seven mills.

The original brick structure, identified as the "Webb Mill" on the 1859 Walling map, runs parallel to Sumner Brook. A mill race once flowed through it. The long main factory section has a gabled roof trimmed by a corbeled brick cornice moulding. The exterior has vertical metal supports that reinforce the brick walls. The two mansard roofed ells, added prior to 1874, have a number of gabled dormers. A smokestack and decorative towers that crowned different parts of the roof were removed after 1896.

The building, and nearby dam and pond, reflect South Farms' early industrial history. The Russell Manufacturing Company's success transformed the area into a thriving city district. Three company factories bordered the brook here in 1850; today, only this structure remains.

== See also ==
- Sanseer Mill another mill owned by Russell in Middletown, Connecticut
- National Register of Historic Places listings in Middletown, Connecticut
