= Coite–Hubbard House =

Historic house in Connecticut, United States

- U.S. National Register of Historic Places
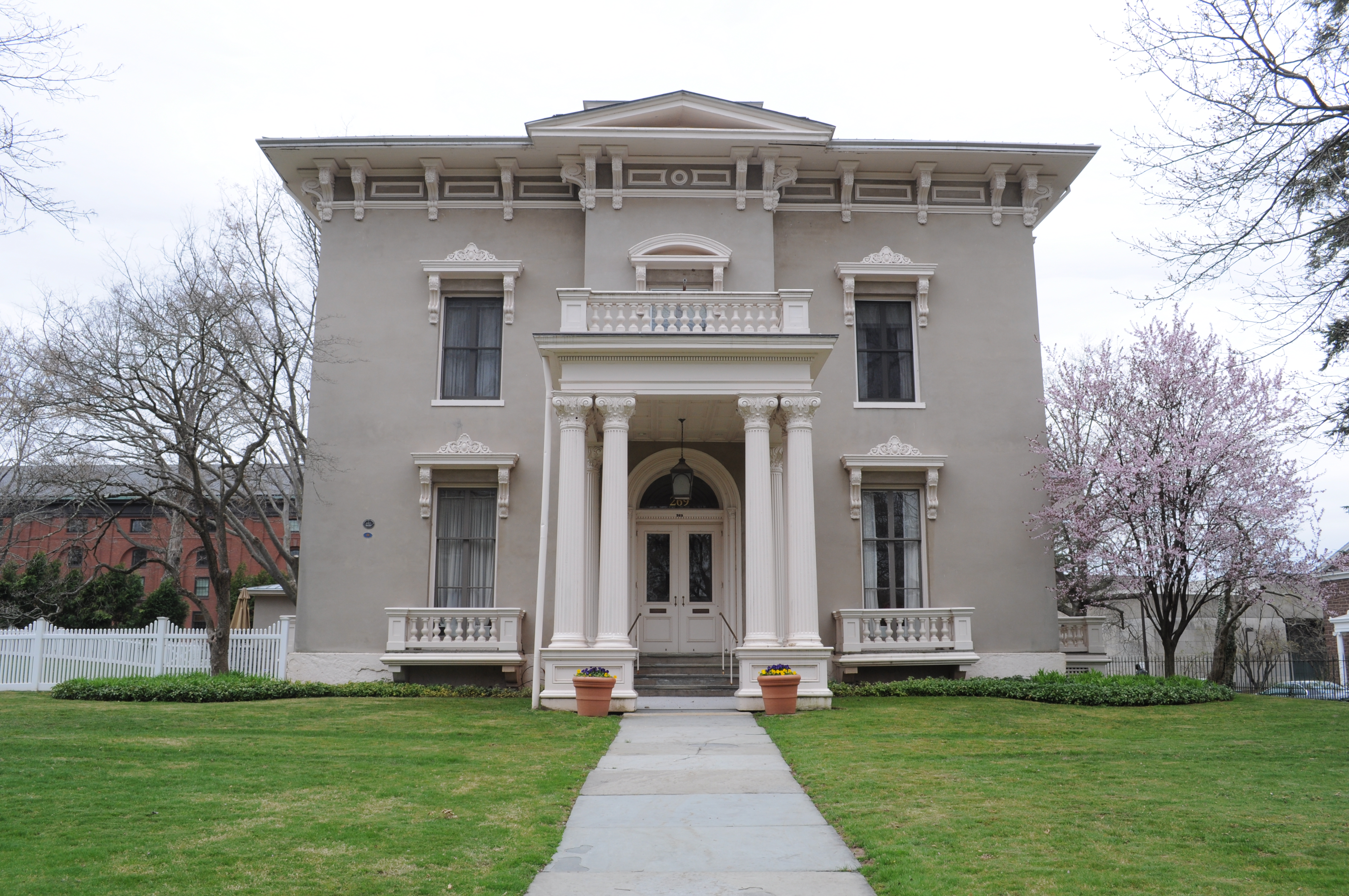

- Location within Connecticut Location within the United States
- Location: 269 High Street; Middletown, Connecticut
- Coordinates: 41°33′26″N 72°39′20″W
- Area: 1 acre (0.40 ha)
- Built: 1856
- Architectural style: Italianate
- NRHP reference No.: 78002846
- Added to NRHP: December 20, 1978

The Coite–Hubbard House is a historic house at 269 High Street in Middletown, Connecticut, United States. Built in 1856, it is a prominent local example of high-style Italianate architecture. Since 1904, it has served as the official residence of the president of Wesleyan University. It was listed on the National Register of Historic Places in 1978.

== Description ==
The house faces east to the Connecticut River from the southwest corner of High Street and Wyllys Avenue. High Street between Church and Washington Streets was the most prestigious residential area in Middletown during the 19th century, and is now a part of the Wesleyan University campus. It is of a symmetrical cube form with a projecting pavilion, prominent porte cochere, and elaborate scrolled brackets beneath the eaves of the roof and cupola. The treatment of the windows is similarly elaborate with heavy flat pediments supported on consoles. There are elaborate crestings in the window pediments of the front facade. The entrance to the house is distinguished by the porte cochere with paired columns and a balustrade.

== Significance ==
This house was built in 1856 by Gabriel Coite, on the site of a house formerly owned by gun maker Simeon North. Coite was a partner in his father's business in Brooklyn, New York, until he retired to Middletown in 1853. In 1860 he was elected State Senator; and in 1862 became treasurer of the State and moved to Hartford. In 1863, the house was acquired by Mrs. Jane Miles Hubbard, widow of Samuel D. Hubbard. Hubbard was co-founder of the Russell Manufacturing Company, builder of the Mansion block, and a Postmaster General. Wesleyan University purchased the property from Mrs. Hubbard's heirs in 1904 for use as the President's residence. Since then Presidents Raymond, Shanklin, Olin, McConaughy (later Governor of Connecticut), Butterfield, Etherington, Campbell, Chase, Bennet, and Roth have occupied the house.

The large scale of this house, together with its elaborate decorative treatment, makes it one of the most sophisticated examples of its style in Middletown. Its site is at the highest elevation on Main Street, and thereby complements the imposing qualities of the architecture.

== See also ==
- National Register of Historic Places listings in Middletown, Connecticut
