= Town Farms Inn =

- U.S. National Register of Historic Places
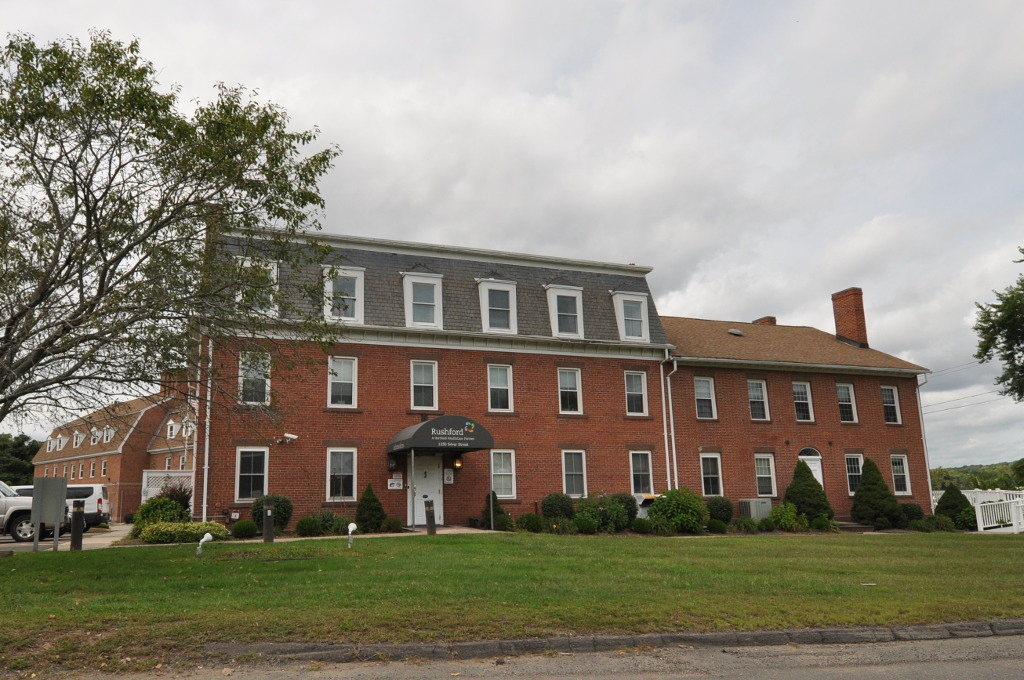

- Location within Connecticut Location within the United States
- Location: Spring Street at River Road, Middletown, Connecticut
- Coordinates: 41°33′28″N 72°37′20″W
- Area: 4.3 acres (1.7 ha)
- Built: c.1839 and 1891
- Architectural style: Federal
- NRHP reference No.: 79002614
- Added to NRHP: May 4, 1979

The Town Farms Inn is a historic poor farm on Silver Street at River Road in Middletown, Connecticut. It was listed on the National Register of Historic Places in 1979. The poor farm provided employment and food for indigent people. (A similar town farm was operated in Hartford, on land now part of the Sigourney Square District.)

There are two principal buildings. The older structure dates back to the late 1830s and is a 2 1/2-story, Federal style house built of brick. It measures 36 feet (11 m) by 34 feet (10 m). The exact date of construction is not known, but the date 1839 is carved into a flagstone in the front walk, and the style of construction is consistent with architecture in the late 1830s. The second building was built in 1891. It is also built of brick on brownstone foundations and measures 52 feet (16 m) by 34 feet (10 m). Between the two buildings, there were 14 rooms on the first floor, 29 rooms on the second, and three on the third floor. The back yard contains a long brick outbuilding, which is one story high and has a pitched roof. The total area of the nominated property is 4.3 acres (1.7 ha).

The inn was originally built as a farmhouse by Thomas Griswold Mather, who married his first cousin Jane Ann Mather in 1834. His wife died in 1853, at which point he sold the farm and the buildings to the town of Middletown. At that time, there were 35 acres (14 ha) in the farm, with an additional 16 acres (6.5 ha) in a wood lot. The town operated it as a poor farm until 1946. By that time, town farms had been superseded by other social agencies. The town sold the property, and the new owners established a restaurant.

== See also ==
- National Register of Historic Places listings in Middletown, Connecticut
