= Edward Augustus Russell House =

Historic house in Connecticut, United States

- U.S. National Register of Historic Places
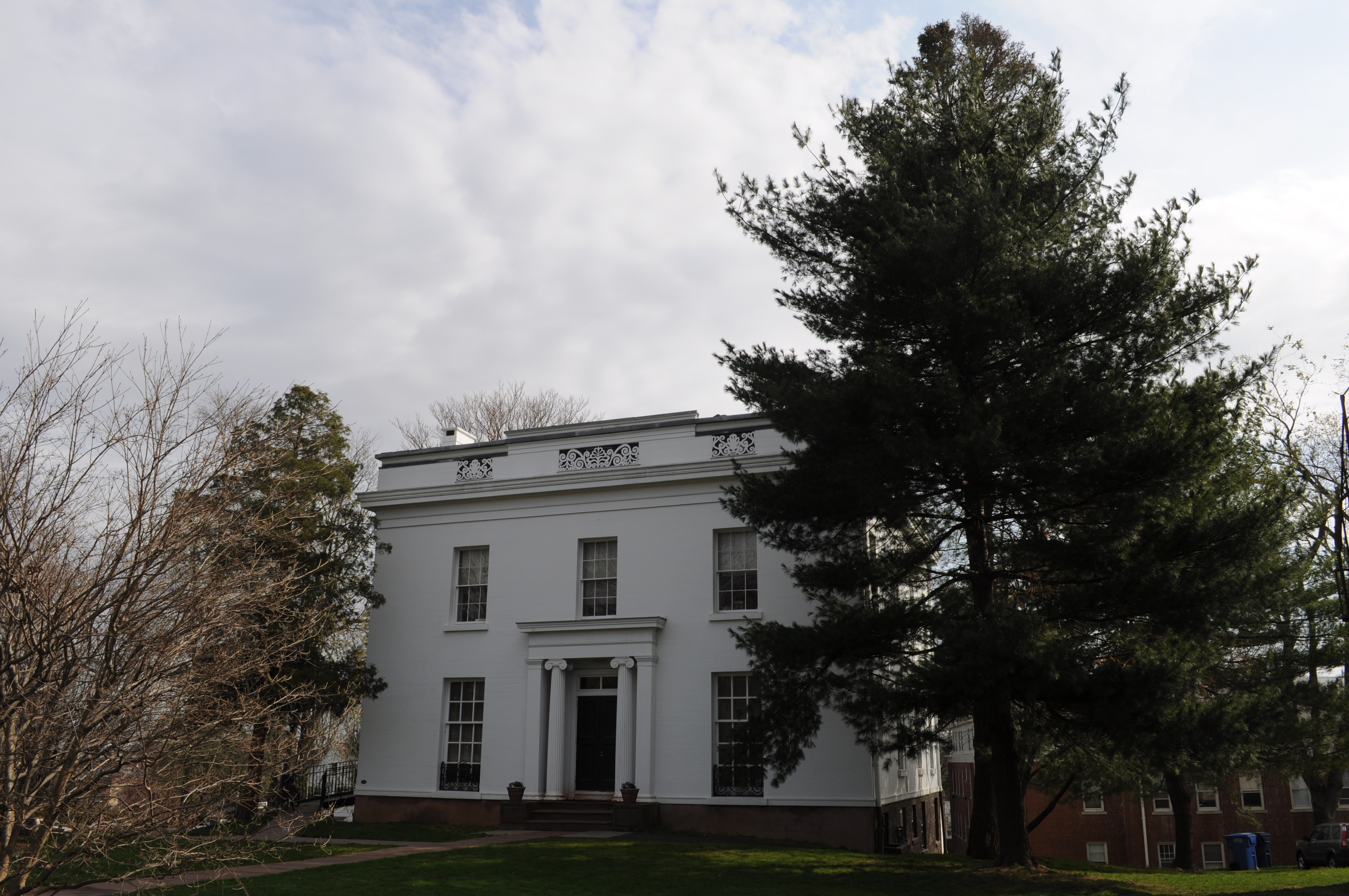
- Photographed in 2012

- Location within Connecticut Location within the United States
- Location: Middletown, Connecticut
- Coordinates: 41°33′31.78″N 72°39′19.51″W
- Built: 1842
- Architect: I. Towns or A.J. Davis
- Architectural style: Greek Revival, Italianate
- NRHP reference No.: 82004336
- Added to NRHP: April 29, 1982

The Edward Augustus Russell House is a Greek Revival house on the Wesleyan University campus in Middletown, Connecticut, USA. The house, at 318 High Street, faces west from the east side of High Street north of the corner at High and Court Streets. A large wooded lawn extends to the Honors College (Russell House 1828) property to the north. High Street between Church and Washington Streets was the most prestigious residential area in Middletown during the 19th century. It was later home to the Kappa Nu Kappa (ΚΝΚ) Fraternity of Wesleyan University. The structural system consists of load-bearing masonry with a flat roof, and materials include brick and flushboarding walls and a brownstone foundation.

== Significance ==
This house was built in 1841-1842 for Edward A. Russell (1797–1874) on a portion of the Russell family estate. Edward Russell worked in the foreign mercantile trade until he returned to Middletown in 1838. He later served as mayor, state representative and national convention delegate.

Edward A. Russell had personal contact with the firm of Town and Davis while supervising the building of the well-known Greek Revival Russell House (1828) for his younger brother, Samuel W. Russell. Thus it is possible that Edward retained the services of this firm when his house was built. Such a possibility is reinforced by early photographs showing the original proportions and decoration. These indicate that the house was a sophisticated and high style example of Greek Revival, and stylistically close to the DeRham Brevoort House (attributed to Davis) in New York City and "Highwood", Henry Whitney's estate in New Haven (1835–1836) by Town and Davis.

Edward Russell's grand-nephew, Richard L. deZeng (1847–1932), occupied the house until his death in 1932. Wesleyan purchased the property from the administrators of the estate of E.A. Russell and then sold it to Alpha Sigma Delta Alumni Association, Inc. in 1934. At this time the structure was altered for use as a fraternity house.

The heavy cornice at the top of the building was lowered to the second floor and windows were placed above the cornice to form a full third floor. Window cornices were removed and new window openings cut in the south facade. The second and third floors were divided into three room suites; however, the first floor remains largely unaltered.

This house was the last example of Greek Revival architecture to be built in the prestigious area of High Street.

== Current use and condition ==
The house is currently used for lectures, concerts, and other special events, and is preserved in good condition. See https://web.archive.org/web/20081205093534/http://www.wesleyan.edu/eventscheduling/therussellhouse.html

== See also ==
- National Register of Historic Places listings in Middletown, Connecticut
