= Berlin Steel =

Steelmaking company

The Berlin Steel Construction Company, doing business as Berlin Steel, is a metal fabrication company with headquarters in Connecticut and Virginia. Berlin Steel is the successor to Berlin Iron Bridge Company, and is credited as the architect of many historical bridges from the early 20th century, at least three of which have been listed on the National Register of Historic Places.

== History ==
In 1900, after the American Bridge Company acquired Berlin Iron Bridge Company, executives Daniel Bradley, George Sage, and Seymour Robinson split from American Bridge to form the Berlin Construction Company. The new company built dozens of iron and steel bridges in the style of the Berlin Iron Bridge Company up until the 1930s, when the company shifted their focus to miscellaneous and structural metals.

In 1962, the company was renamed Berlin Steel Construction Company.

== Works ==
- Two Cent Bridge (1903), the only surviving toll footbridge and one of oldest surviving wire-cable steel suspension bridges in the U.S.; spans the Kennebec River between the city of Waterville and the town of Winslow in Kennebec County, Maine. NRHP-listed.
- Mount Orne Covered Bridge
- Starr Mill Road Bridge
- Taylor Street Bridge
