= Arrawanna Bridge =

- U.S. National Register of Historic Places
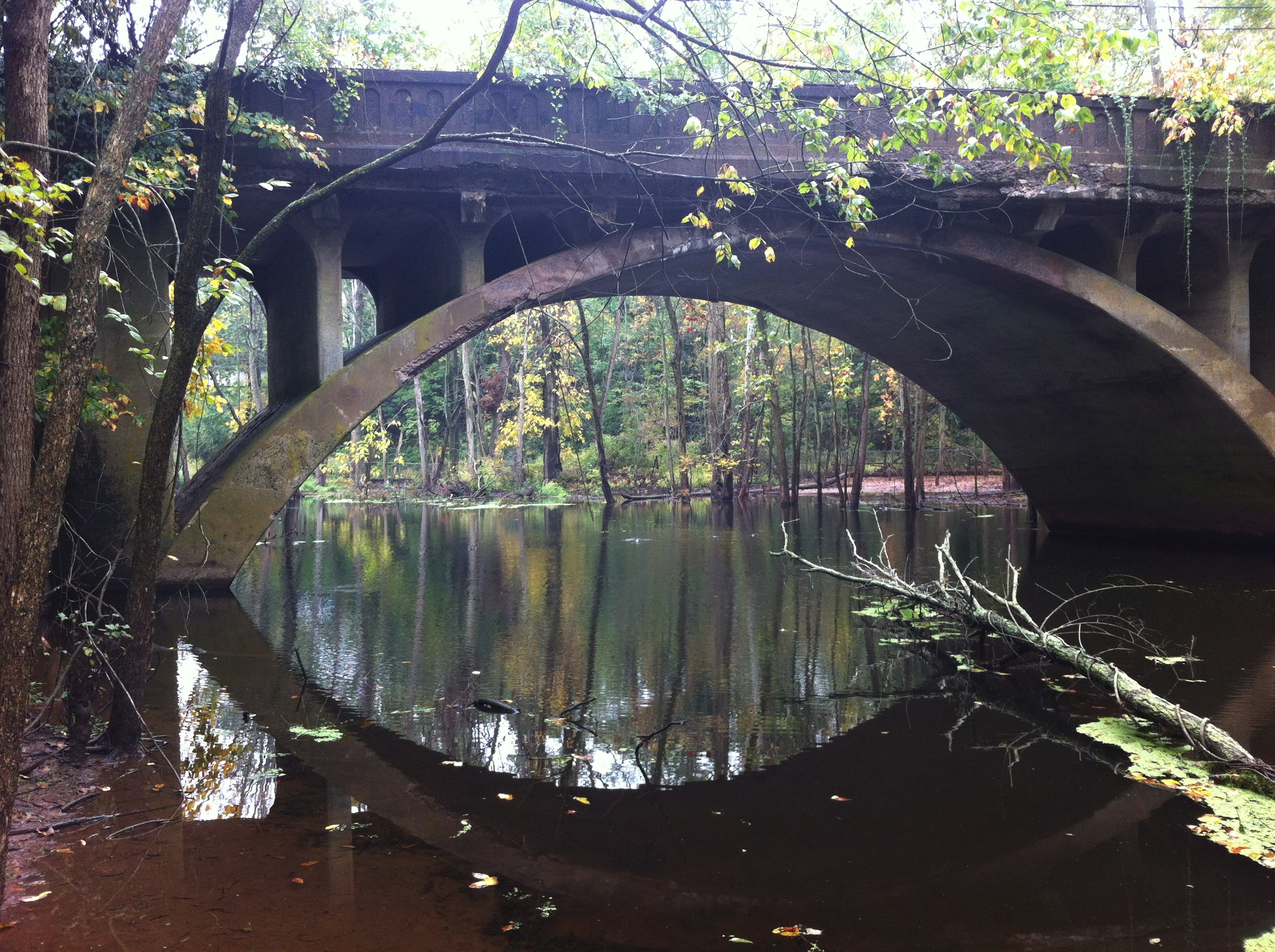

- Location within Connecticut Location within the United States
- Location: Berlin Street at Coginchaug River, Middletown, Connecticut
- Coordinates: 41°33′46″N 72°40′0″W
- Area: less than one acre
- Built: 1918
- Architect: Connecticut Highway Department
- Architectural style: open-spandrel concrete arch
- NRHP reference No.: 04001092
- Added to NRHP: September 29, 2004

The Arrawanna Bridge is a historic bridge, spanning the Coginchaug River near Berlin Street in Middletown, Connecticut, USA. Built in 1918, it is an early example in the state of an open-spandrel concrete arch bridge, and is one of the state's oldest bridges. It was listed on the National Register of Historic Places in 2004. The bridge is now closed to all traffic.

== Description and history ==
The Arrawanna Bridge is located west of downtown Middletown, beyond the western end of Berlin Street, which now terminates before the bridge. The bridge is an open-spandrel structure built out of reinforced concrete, with a total length of 55 feet (17 m) and an arch height of 19 feet (5.8 m). The arch is 20 feet (6.1 m) wide, with the concrete road deck supported by eight 12-inch walls rising from various points on the arch. The roadway has sidewalls 3 feet (0.91 m) high, ending at elevated piers.

The bridge was built in 1918 and designed by the Connecticut Highway Department. The bridge is one of the oldest surviving structures of Connecticut's state highway department, and is the only barrel-arch design of the state's six open-spandrel bridges. "Even as a near ruin, it adds to our appreciation of the high level of technical expertise shown by the state's first bridge engineers, and it recalls the very first years of state-highway bridge construction in Connecticut."

At the time it was built, reinforced concrete was a relatively new material for bridge construction. The bridge was featured in the 1918 annual report of the Connecticut Highway Department. The bridge is owned by the city of Middletown.

Berlin Street was at that time the major route leading north from downtown Middletown. In 1974, a new alignment of Connecticut Route 3 bypassed Berlin Street to the west, and the bridge was closed. By 2003, the bridge was deteriorating in place, with shrubs growing in the roadway.

== See also ==
- National Register of Historic Places listings in Middletown, Connecticut
- List of bridges on the National Register of Historic Places in Connecticut
