= Washington Street Historic District (Middletown, Connecticut) =

Historic district in Connecticut, United States

- U.S. National Register of Historic Places
- U.S. Historic district
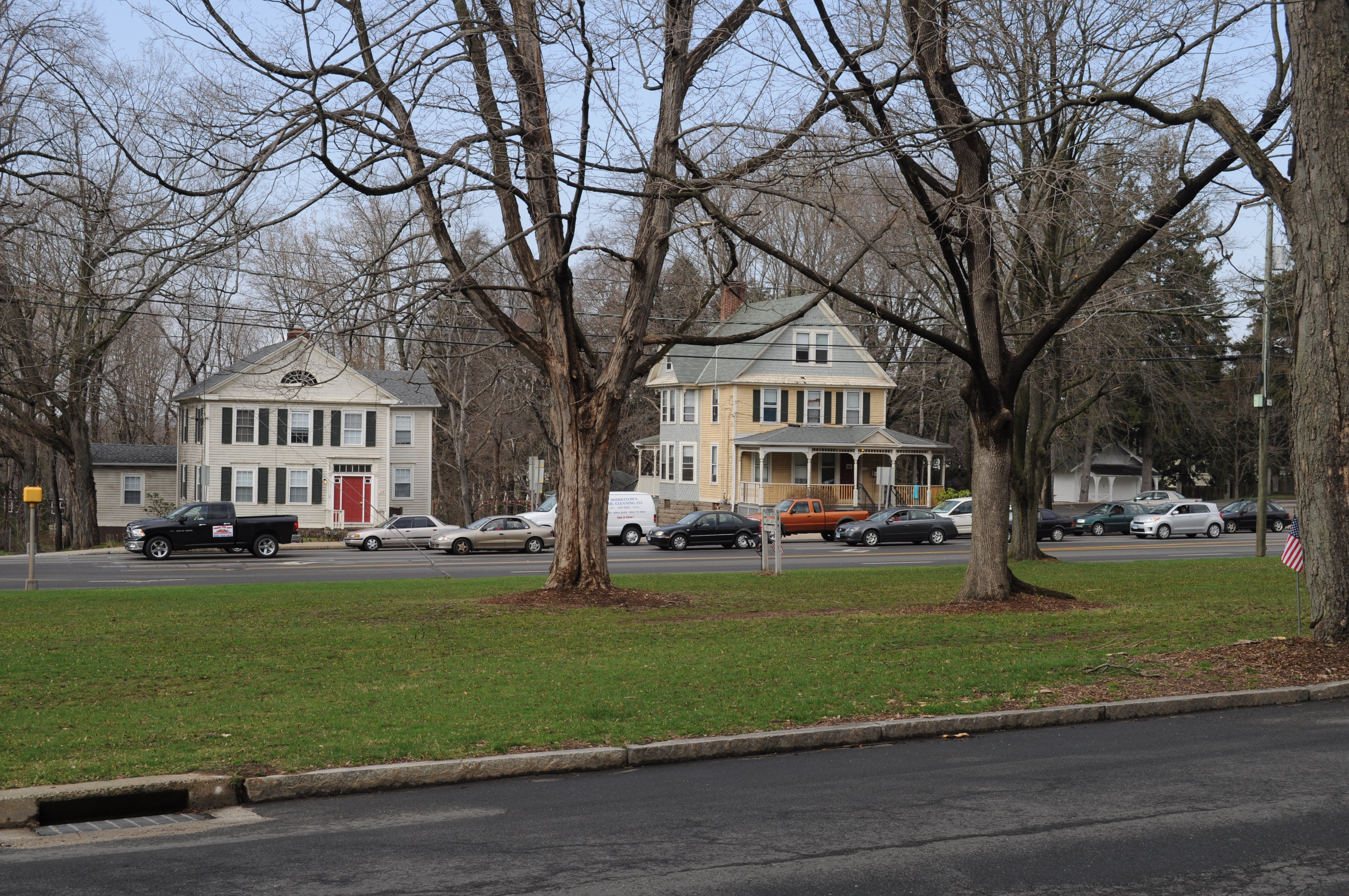
- Two houses in the Washington Street Historic District. The house on the left, 324 Washington Street, is the Henry Aston House.

- Location within Connecticut Location within the United States
- Location: Roughly bounded by Washington and Main Streets, Washington Terrace and Vine Street, Middletown, Connecticut
- Coordinates: 41°33′41″N 72°39′31″W
- Area: 31 acres (13 ha)
- Built: 1752&endash1931
- Architect: Multiple
- Architectural style: Late 19th and 20th Century Revivals, Greek Revival, and Late Victorian
- NRHP reference No.: 85001018
- Added to NRHP: May 9, 1985

The Washington Street Historic District encompasses a residential area of Middletown, Connecticut that has a long history as a fashionable and desirable neighborhood. Extending along Washington Street and Washington Terrace between Main and Jackson Streets, the area has a broad diversity of residential architecture dating from 1752 to 1931, reflecting the city's patterns of growth. The district was listed on the National Register of Historic Places in 1985.

== Description and history ==
Middletown was established in the 17th century as a mainly agrarian community, and developed as a major regional port in the mid-18th century, with shipping extending along the east coast and to the West Indies. During this period, merchants and ship captains built fashionable houses along Washington Street, which was then known as Boston Road. It was renamed in honor of George Washington after his visit in 1789. The city continued to flourish as a maritime center until the War of 1812. Investment then began into various industrial manufacturing concerns, which brought the city out of its decline in the second half of the 19th century and powered it into the mid-20th century. The residential architecture of Washington Street is reflective of the changing fortunes of the city.

The district is centered on the five-acre Washington Terrace Park. In addition to the park, the district also includes the West Burying Ground and 32 contributing buildings dating from 1752 to 1931 with examples of Late 19th and 20th Century Revivals, Greek Revival, and Late Victorian architecture. The district is mostly linear along Washington Street (Route 66) bounded on the west by Jackson Street and on the east by Main Street. Some of the buildings in the district are now owned by and part of Wesleyan University.

Although it is mainly residential, the district includes two churches. One is St. Sebastian Church, a Mediterranean Revival structure built by Italian masons to resemble a church in Melilli, Sicily. The other church, built to house a Lutheran congregation in 1958, is not historically significant.

== See also ==
- National Register of Historic Places listings in Middletown, Connecticut
