= Saint Luke's Home for Destitute and Aged Women =

- U.S. National Register of Historic Places
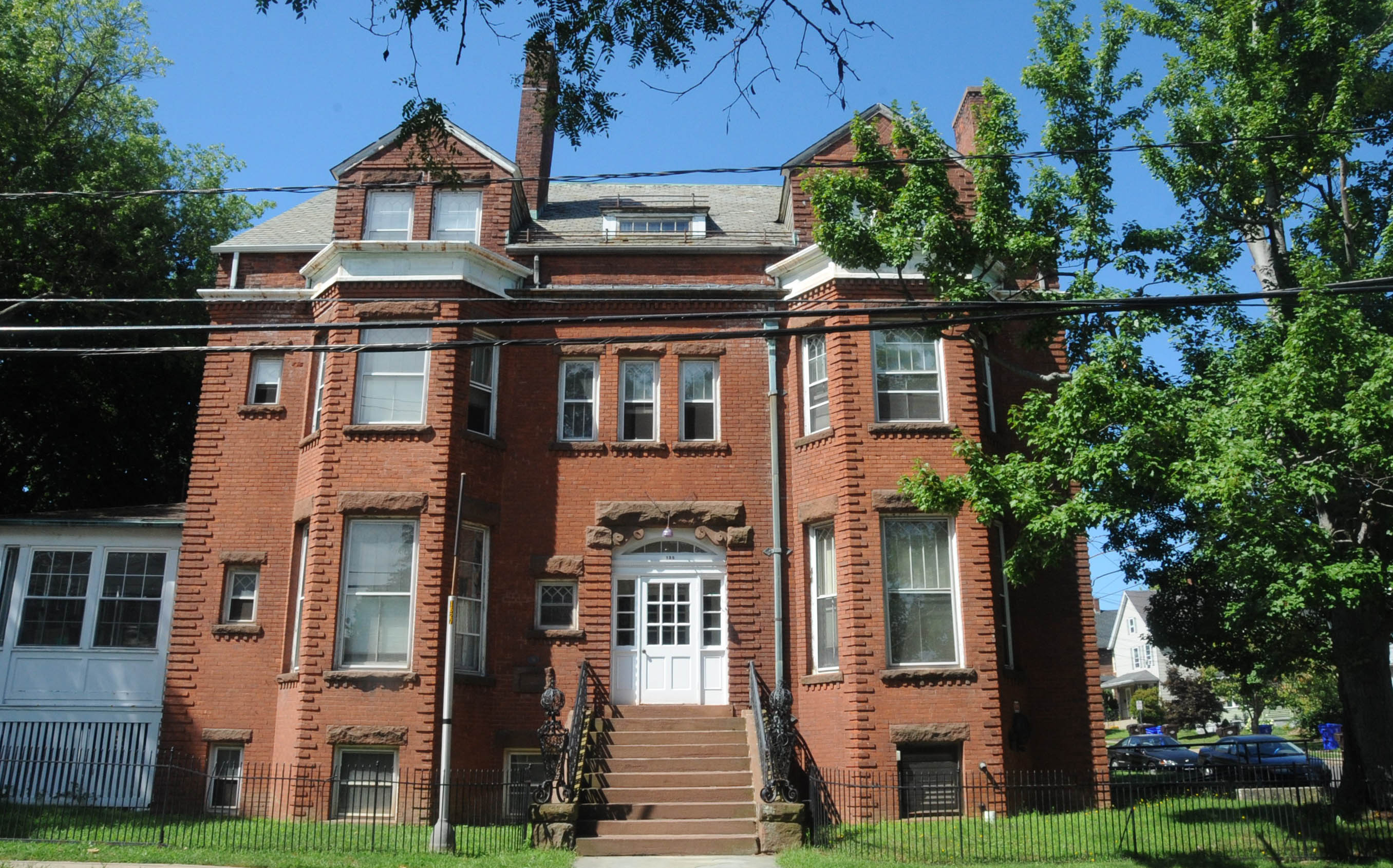
- In 2016

- Location within Connecticut Location within the United States
- Location: 135 Pearl Street, Middletown, Connecticut
- Coordinates: 41°33′42″N 72°39′17.5″W
- Area: 0.3 acres (0.12 ha)
- Built: 1892
- Architectural style: Victorian Institutional, Academic Classicism details with Brick walls, Brownstone Foundation, and a Slate Roof
- NRHP reference No.: 82004337
- Added to NRHP: April 29, 1982

St. Luke's Home for Destitute and Aged Women was incorporated by an act of the Connecticut State Assembly on June 22, 1865. For twenty-seven years the home was conducted in an old house on the southwest corner of Court and Pearl Street. in 1892 a large legacy enabled a new home to be erected at the present site at Pearl and Lincoln Streets. Comfortable quarters are provided for fourteen women. Members of the Church of the Holy Trinity played a large part in establishing the endowment; frequently the current rector of that church serves as president of the Board of Trustees.

The substantial brick building looks like a carefully designed apartment house, rather than an institution. At three-and-a-half stories tall, the first floor is partly below ground level. A long run of brownstone steps leads to a center entrance door on the second floor level. Two bay window piers flank the front entrance, capped off above the roof line by gable-roofed dormers. Decorative elements such as the wrought iron fence, ivy on the facade, and quoin-like brick projections on all corners add a picturesque quality to the building.

The large brick institutional building dominates the area by its mass and corner siting at Pearl and Lincoln Streets in Middletown's residential North End. It forms a dividing line between large structures to the south towards Washington Street and more modest late Victorian era worker homes to the north.

== See also ==
- National Register of Historic Places listings in Middlesex County, Connecticut
