= Sanseer Mill =

- U.S. National Register of Historic Places
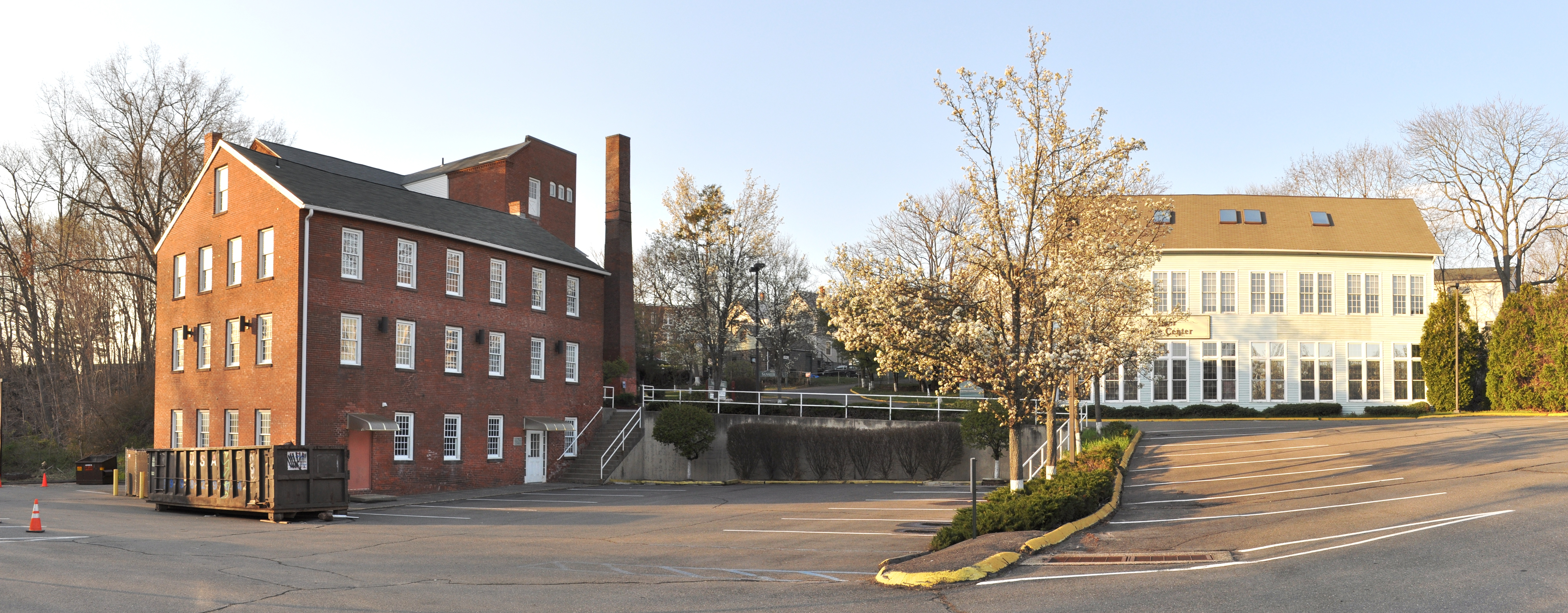
- Panoramic view of Sanseer Mill, 2012

- Location within Connecticut Location within the United States
- Location: 282 Main Street Extension, Middletown, Connecticut
- Coordinates: 41°32′59″N 72°38′31″W
- Area: 4 acres (1.6 ha)
- Built: 1845
- NRHP reference No.: 86002101
- Added to NRHP: July 31, 1986

The Sanseer Mill is a historic 19th-century mill at 282 Main Street Extension in Middletown, Connecticut. It was added to the United States National Register of Historic Places in 1986.

== Relationship to surroundings ==
This large brick structure is one of three industrial buildings that share a secluded, well-kept site in South Farms district. Separated from Main Street Extension by trees and undergrowth, the landscaped grounds are behind a row of East Main Street buildings. This, the largest structure, adjoins a brick building south; nearby to the east is a large barn-like structure.

Since redeveloped during the 1980s, the address of the complex is 282 Main Street Extension. The previous entrance to East Main Street still exists as an exit.

== Significance ==
This large brick building was constructed probably a short time after the Russell Manufacturing Company obtained the property in 1884. The site, formerly developed by the Sanseer Manufacturing Company, includes a brick building which had been that company's main shop, built in 1845. The Russell Manufacturing Company, established in 1834, produced a great variety of cotton and elastic woven goods. By 1894, it was the nation's largest manufacturer of suspenders, employing 900 workers in the company's seven groups of mills. This mill, powered by steam, probably housed weaving looms as did the other two buildings nearby. These structures formed the company's Sanseer Mill complex. In 1937, Philip Bliss purchased the property, which primarily used the property for office and storage space for the P&H Bliss Company.

The structure has two dominant vertical elements: a four-story stairwell extends from the middle of one side and a tall rectangular stack stands close by. The main entrance displays a small wooden portico. Its columns and plain entablature, painted white, contrast with the building's brick walls.

This structure, one of the least altered early mills in the area, reflect the substantial development South Farms underwent following the American Civil War. During the late 19th century, the district experienced marked industrial and residential growth, primarily influenced by the success of the Russell Manufacturing Company.

== Current Use and Condition ==
The Sanseer Mill was redeveloped into modern office space in the early 1980s. During the 1990s to 2003, the building was owned by Whitney Garlinghouse, owner of The Garlinghouse Company, an architectural house plan company, which housed its offices in the complex. The old buildings were maintained in original condition at great expense. The property was purchased by Dinar Chaudhury in 2006.

As of 2011, the complex is partially occupied by numerous tenants, including John Conroy, DMD of Conroy Orthodontics, Anthony Onofrio, DMD and Pamela Moore, DMD of Middlesex Dental Associates, Roger Lane, DC of the Middletown Chiropractic Center, Jeffrey Palmer, OD and Dorothy Robison Collins, OD of the Palmer Eyecare Center, New England Residential Services, RaMa Luna Yoga Studio, and New England Geosystems, LLC (GIS consultants). In 2021, Life Finishing School replaced RaMa Luna Yoga Studio on the third floor of building C. In 2023 the Pieper Veterinary Group moved into two of units.

== See also ==
- Russell Company Upper Mill another mill owned by Russell in Middletown
- National Register of Historic Places listings in Middlesex County, Connecticut
