= Wilcox, Crittenden Mill =

- U.S. National Register of Historic Places
- U.S. Historic district
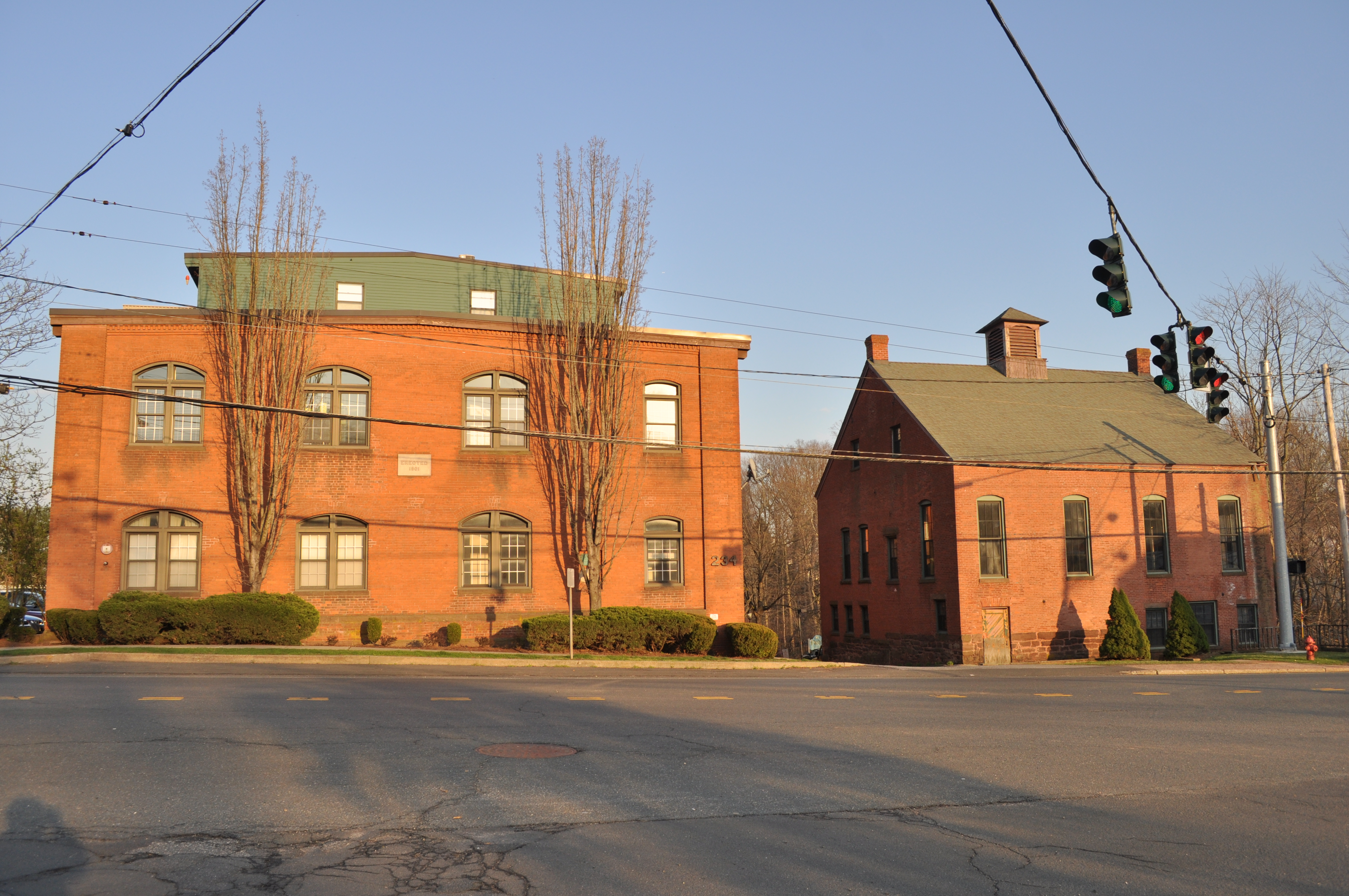
- Mill B (left) and Mill A (right), photographed 2012

- Location within Connecticut Location within the United States
- Location: 234-315 South Main Street, Pameacha, and Highlands Avenues, Middletown, Connecticut
- Coordinates: 41.5499°N 72.6501°W
- Area: 17 acres (6.9 ha)
- Built: 1814
- NRHP reference No.: 86003349
- Added to NRHP: December 3, 1986

The Wilcox, Crittenden Mill, also known as Wilcox, Crittenden Mill Historic District, is a 17-acre (6.9 ha) property in Middletown, Connecticut that was listed on the National Register of Historic Places in 1986. It was the location of the Wilcox, Crittenden company, a marine hardware firm. The historic district listing included four contributing buildings and three other contributing sites.

== Buildings ==
The mill complex consists of four surviving mill buildings, built between 1814 and 1917, and foundational remnants of others, as well as two brownstone dams. Mill A, built in 1814 to house weaving operations, was converted into an office when larger facilities were built. Mill B, located to its north, is 247 feet (75 m) long, and was built between 1901 and 1912. Mill C is a concrete block structure built in 1907, and is 350 feet (110 m) long. Mill D stands across the ravine of Pamachea Creek from Mill C, and is the youngest of the four buildings.

== Relationship to surroundings ==
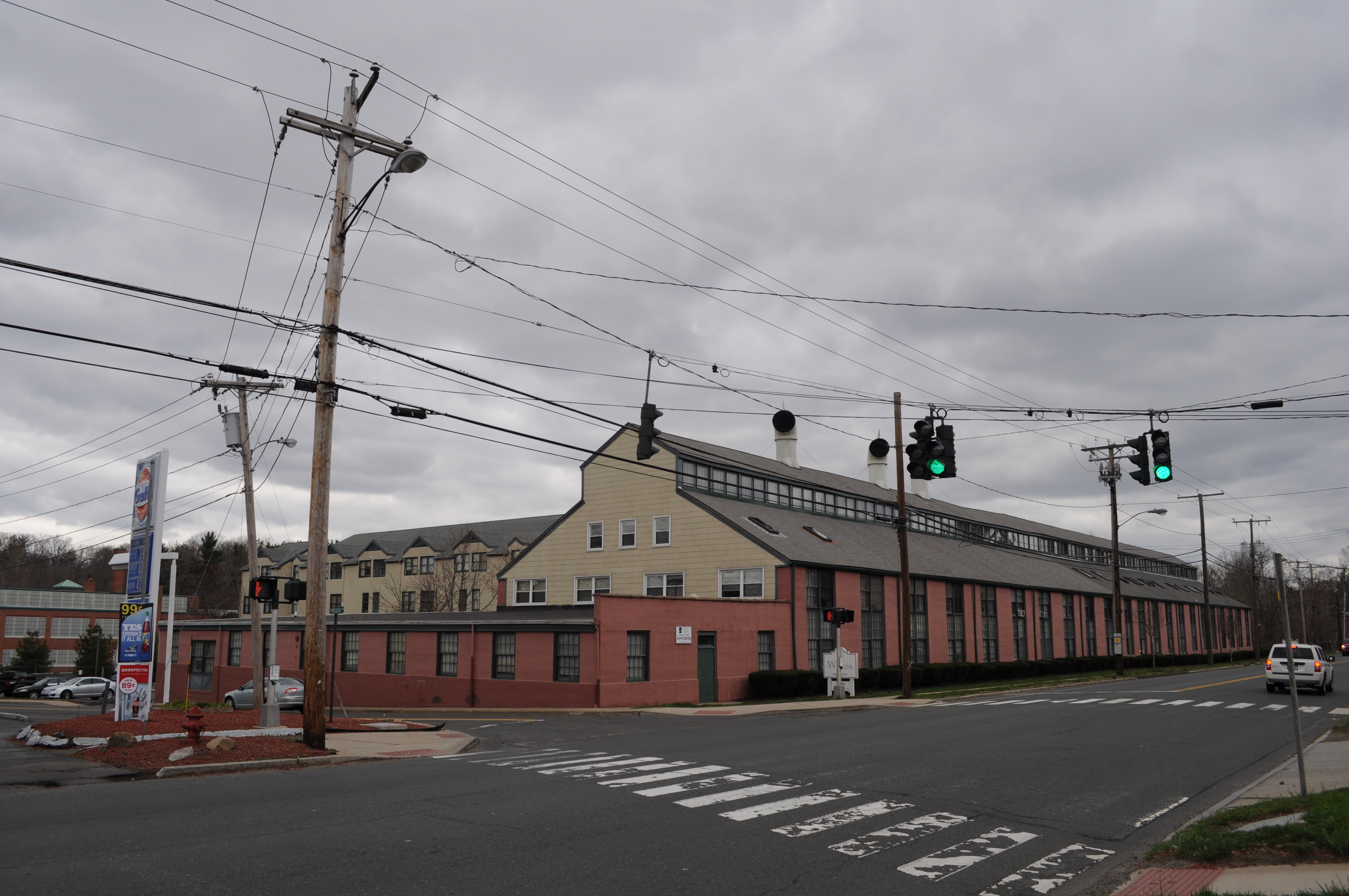
Mill C, photographed 2012

This building is sited on the north bank of Pameacha Creek. It is located in a commercial and industrial area and faces the busy intersection of Warwick and South Main Streets. Nearby are related, later factory buildings. A modern solar-energized bank is located across the intersection to the west.

== Significance ==
The main part of this structure was erected in 1814 by John Watkinson as a woolen factory. Pamecha Creek was a prime source of water power in Middletown; a mill had occupied this site since the 1650s. Following Watkinson's death in 1836, this building was occupied by another woolen business, known as The Pamecha Manufacturing Company.

In 1849 William Walter Wilcox, a young and aggressive factory worker, went into business with Ira Penfield, his employer. Together they continued manufacturing Penfield's recently patented grommet (a small metal device used in the raising and lowering of sails) in the basement of this building, and established the firm of Penfield and Wilcox. Wilcox then went on the road, successfully selling this new device, and establishing a coast-to-coast reputation. When Penfield retired in 1857, Wilcox took in Joseph Hall Jr. as a partner and the firm known as Wilcox and Hall was established. Hall left the business in 1867. in 1869 the firm acquired the name by which it has been known for over one hundred years, The Wilcox, Crittenden and Company. The firm's prominent managers at this time were William Walter Wilcox, Albert R. Crittenden (a former Middletown Mayor), E. Bound Chaffee, and Homer Churchill. This firm brought force and strength to the ships' chandlery business. They constructed additions to the existing structures to meet their rapidly growing needs. Their success was attributed to honesty, paying close attention to the business and having a good understanding of maritime needs.

On a summer night in 1907 a devastating fire attacked the premises. Virtually every building and its contents on Pamecha ravine was destroyed, except for a small brick structure and the addition to the south. This determined firm rebuilt within two years, without losing a customer or laying off an employee. Except for this building and a slightly larger and later structure on the south side of the Pamecha Creek, all the structures related to the firm were built after the 1907 fire.

This 2 1/2-story brick structure displays some of its early exterior features; brownstone sills and lintels, and two corbelled chimneys. The windows on the west facade were lengthened, the brownstone lintels removed and replaced by segmental-arched brick lintels. The cupola was replaced. The wing, attached to its south wall, probably dates from the late 19th century. More decorative, it displays corbelled brick work and an unusual arched window on the west facade. A large mural of a clipper ship is painted on the south wall.

The Pamecha Creek played an important role in Middletown's early manufacturing operations. The many water-powered factories located on its banks were largely responsible for this city's industrial prosperity in the early nineteenth century. This building is one of the few survivors of that prosperous era.

The site is additionally significant as an archeological site. Not only has it been in continuous use since 1650, but documents indicate that much of the machinery and tools damaged in the 1907 fire were not removed from the steep ravine.

== Current use and condition ==
Three of the four surviving mill buildings have been converted to apartments. Mill B and the rather small Mill A are a condominium; Mill C on the other side of South Main Street is low-income housing).

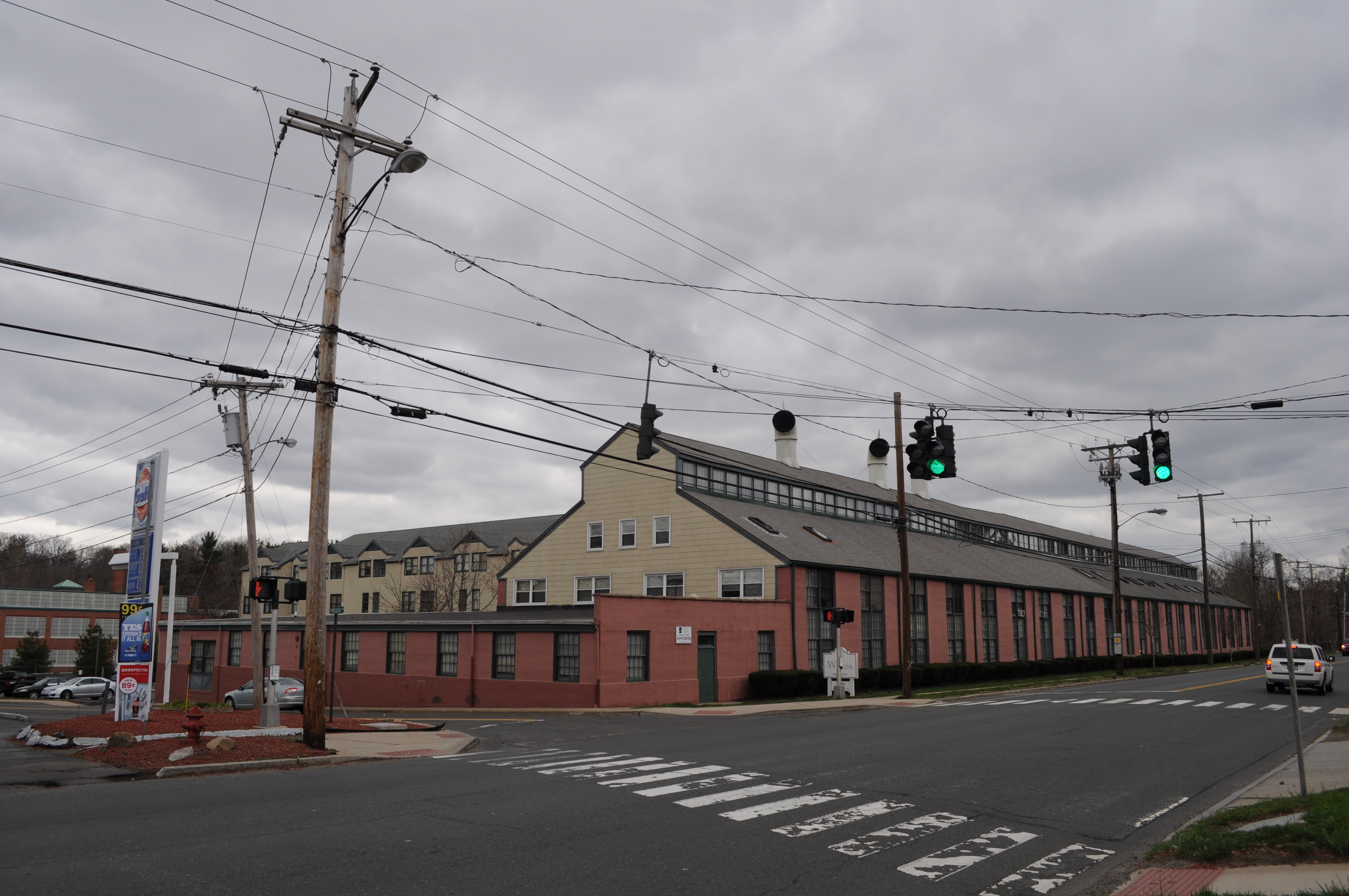
Mill C: galvanizing and forge shop built 1907, now low-income housing.

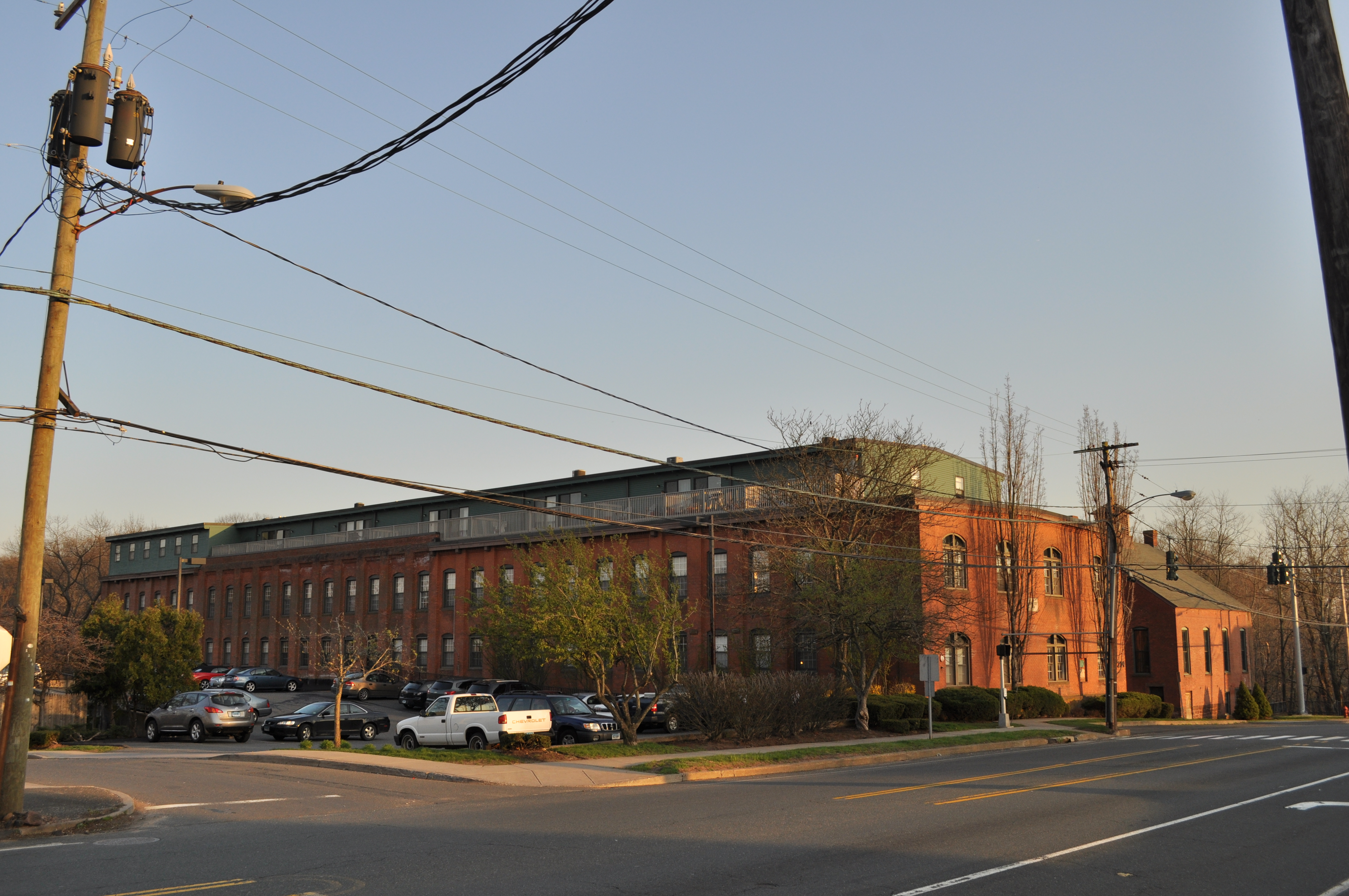
Mill B (left, built in stages 1901-1912) and Mill A (right, built 1814). Now condominiums.

== See also ==
- National Register of Historic Places listings in Middletown, Connecticut
