= Captain Benjamin Williams House =

Historic house in Connecticut, United States

- U.S. National Register of Historic Places
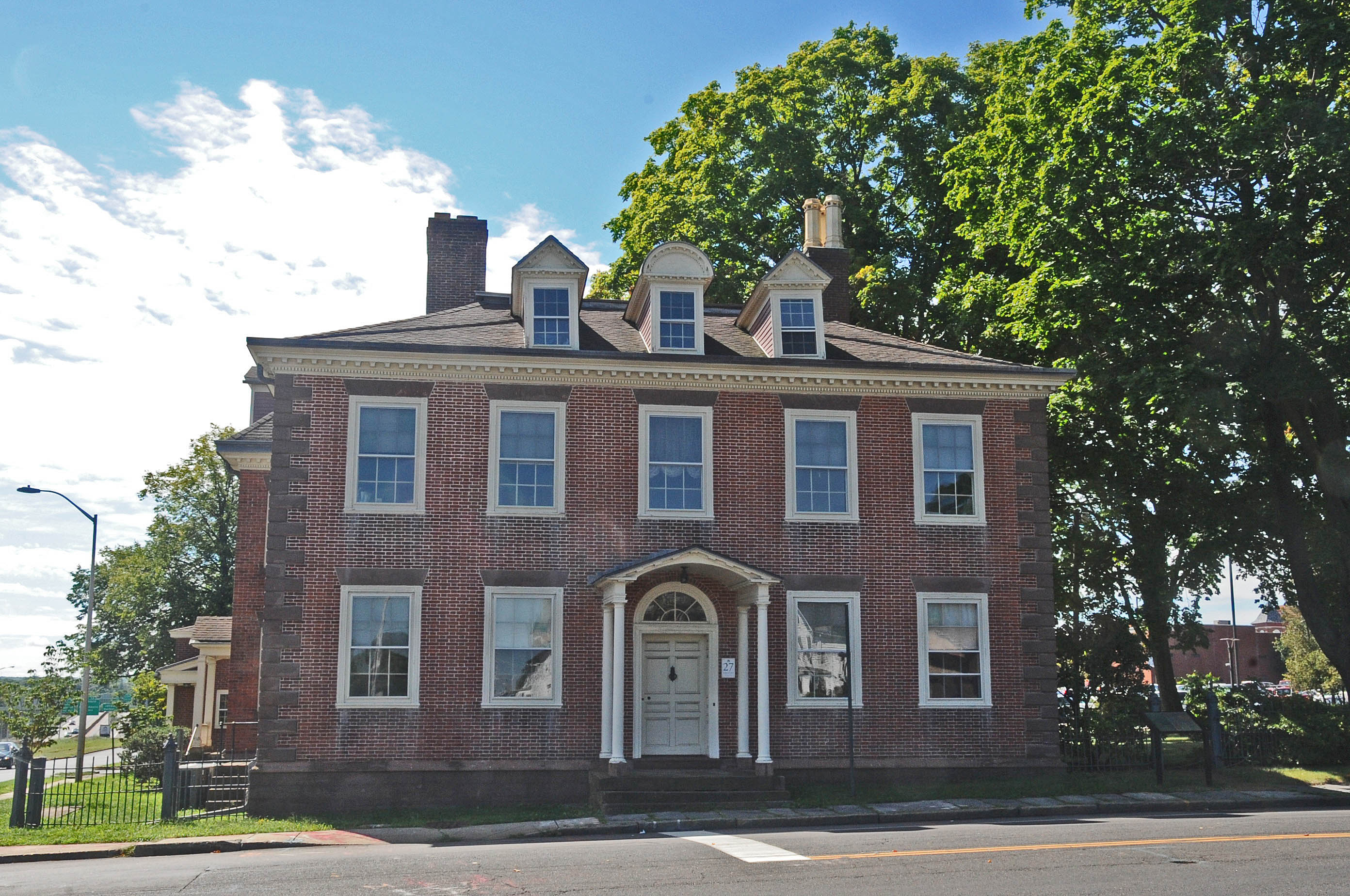
- 2016 photo

- Location within Connecticut Location within the United States
- Location: 27 Washington Street, Middletown, Connecticut
- Coordinates: 41°33′46.81″N 72°38′54.34″W
- Area: 0.75 acres (0.30 ha)
- Built: c. 1797
- Architectural style: Georgian
- NRHP reference No.: 09000143
- Added to NRHP: December 1, 1978

The Captain Benjamin Williams House, also known as deKoven House or DeKoven Community Center, is a historic house at 27 Washington Street in Middletown, Connecticut. Built in the late 18th century, it is a particularly fine example of late Georgian architecture, and was listed on the National Register of Historic Places in 1978. It is now owned and operated by the Rockfall Foundation and operated as a community center.

== Description and history ==
The Captain Benjamin Williams House stands just east of downtown Middletown, at the southwest corner of Washington Street and deKoven Drive. It is an L-shaped two-story brick structure, its original main block set close to Washington Street and facing north. It is covered by a hip roof, with two chimneys rising behind the main ridge line. The main facade is five bays wide, with a symmetrical placement of sash windows around the centered entrance. Windows are capped by brownstone lintels, and the building corners are finished with brownstone quoining. The main entrance features a doorway with half-round fanlight, and a gabled portico supported by slender round columns. The main roof's cornice has dentil moulding, and its front face is pierced by three dormers, with peaked or semicircular gables.

The house was built in the 1790s for Benjamin Williams, a well-to-do sea captain (Middletown was then a major shipping center in trade with the West Indies). Williams died in 1812, and his heirs sold the house to Henry deKoven. It remained in the hands of his descendants until 1942, during which time it was converted to professional use. It underwent a major restoration by architectural historian J. Frederick Kelly shortly before its donation to the Rockfall Foundation. The property was renovated later in the 20th century with architectural work by Jeffrey Dale Bianco, AIA.

It is "Middletown Heritage Trail Site 4" in a walking trail.

== See also ==
- National Register of Historic Places listings in Middletown, Connecticut
