= Middletown Alms House =

- U.S. National Register of Historic Places
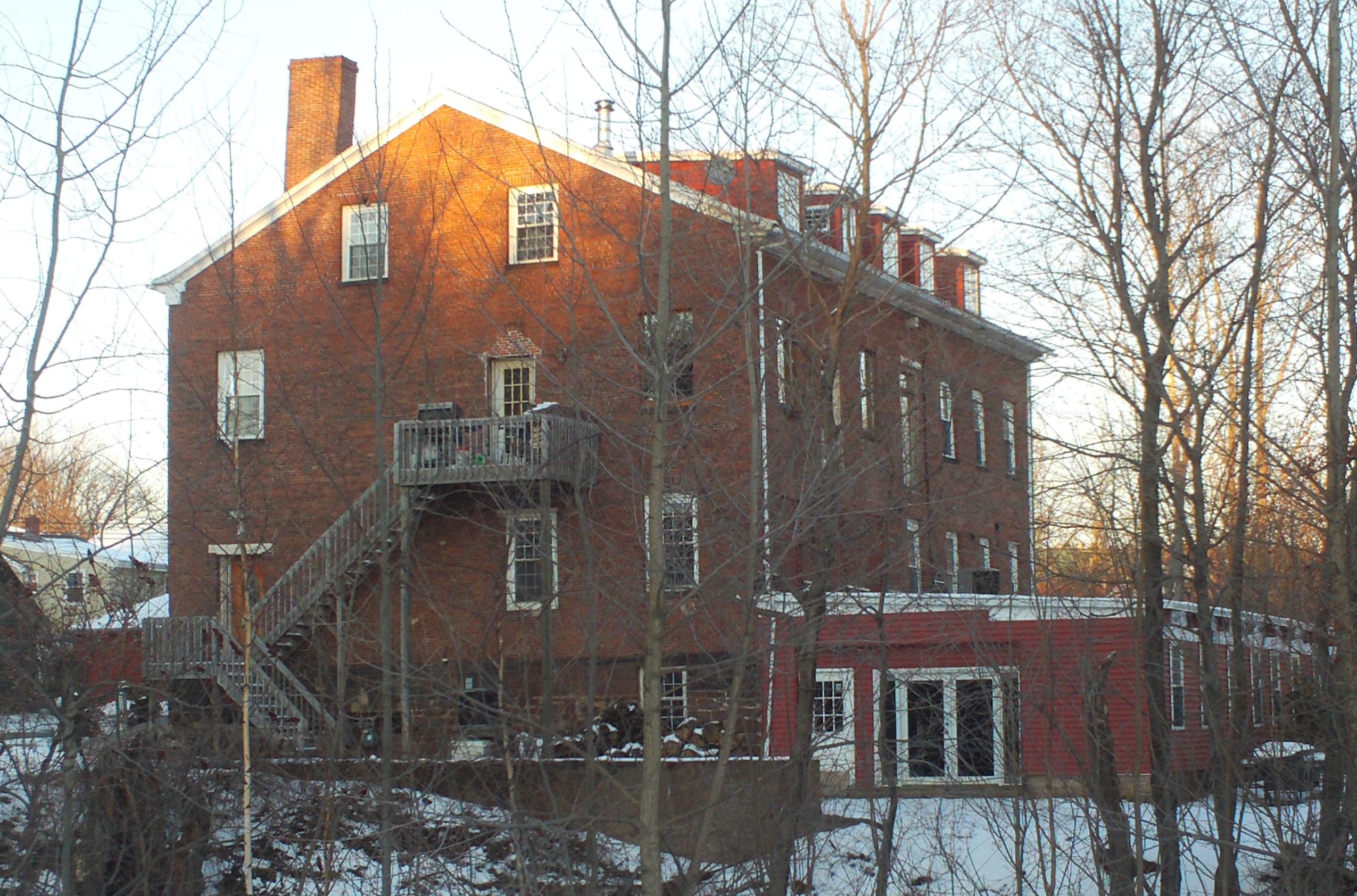

- Location within Connecticut Location within the United States
- Location: 53 Warwick Street, Middletown, Connecticut
- Coordinates: 41°32′56″N 72°39′9″W
- Area: 1.3 acres (0.53 ha)
- Built: 1813–1814
- NRHP reference No.: 82003772
- Added to NRHP: April 29, 1982

The Middletown Alms House is a historic building at 53 Warwick Street in Middletown, Connecticut, constructed in 1813–1814. It was originally used as a poorhouse and is the oldest surviving building built for housing the poor in Connecticut, as well as one of the oldest such in the United States. One of the largest structures of the Federal period in Middletown, it was listed on the National Register of Historic Places in 1982.

== History ==
The Town of Middletown built the Alms House in 1814 to house the town's poor. Many of the people housed there were required to work, either in the Alms House or in a local industrial business.

The building at 53 Warwick Street served as a poorhouse until 1853, when the institution was moved to the Middletown Town Farms facility on Silver Street in the town's South Farms district.

Shortly after, the Hubbard and Curtis Hardware Company occupied the building. This company, which manufactured tools, hardware, and wood-burning stoves, had its principal place of commerce on Main Street (359 Main Street) and manufactured its goods in this building. In the early 20th century, Fred I. Hodge, Sr. owned the Middletown Fire Arms and Specialty which manufactured valve wheels and guns. The Middletown Rifle Club had a rifle range in the basement and Hodge also repaired automobiles there. By 1981, C.B. Stone Inc., a home heating oil dealer, had occupied the building since the early 1930s. It is currently used for offices.

== Description ==
The three-and-a-half-story building is constructed in the Federal style and made of brick with Flemish bond and a brownstone foundation with an asphalt shingle roof. The architect and builder are unknown. A graphic depiction on an 1825 map indicates that the building was originally embellished by a segmental arch over the entrance door and a classical cupola. A central, slightly projecting, pavilion is still discernible. The building has a structural system of load-bearing masonry with a gable roof.

Located to the north on the premises, facing Warwick Street, is a late-Victorian brick residence. This substantial structure, once owned by Mayor Leo B. Santangelo, displays intricate stickwork on the veranda, and decorative brickwork, and is in relatively original condition. The southeast section of this structure is supported by large brownstone blocks. These blocks are the remains of a jail which was built on the Alms House grounds in 1846. It was a small facility, containing only twelve cells, with the principal jail being in Haddam.

This structure, which faces north, sits on a 1.3 acres (0.53 ha) lot on the south side of residential Warwick Street. It is set back from the road behind two late-19th-century houses. A large oak tree to the west shades it.

== See also ==
- National Register of Historic Places listings in Middletown, Connecticut
