= Taylor Street Bridge =

Coordinates: 44°15′35″N 72°34′48″W

The Taylor Street Bridge is a Parker through truss bridge that crosses the Winooski River in Montpelier, Vermont. It was built in 1929 by the Berlin Construction Company. The bridge is listed on the National Register of Historic Places.
