= Plumb House (Middletown, Connecticut) =

Historic house in Connecticut

- U.S. National Register of Historic Places
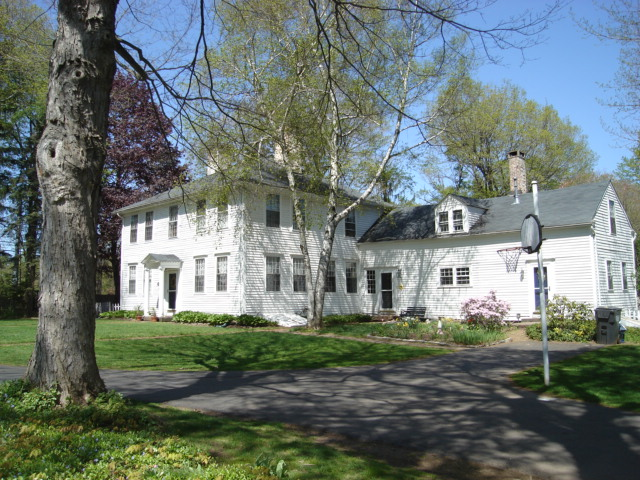

- Location within Connecticut Location within the United States
- Location: Middletown, Connecticut
- Coordinates: 41°33′49″N 72°42′6″W
- Built: 1738
- Architect: Plumb, James
- Architectural style: Georgian
- NRHP reference No.: 78002848
- Added to NRHP: December 01, 1978

The Plumb House is a historic house at 872 Westfield Street in Middletown, Connecticut, USA. It was built in 1804 by James Plumb, and is exceptionally well preserved. It was listed on the National Register of Historic Places in 1978.

The house is built with clapboard sidings, a brownstone foundation and an asphalt shingle roof. It has a wood frame, with post and beam construction and a hip roof. The architect and builder are unknown. Historically and currently it has been a private residence.

== Significance ==
James Plumb, a well-to-do farmer in Westfield, built this house in 1804 on land inherited from his father, Samuel Plumb. The house remained in the Plumb-Barry family until 1888; since then it has passed through a succession of owners while retaining its traditional residential usage.

This finely-scaled Federal style frame house is of a central hall plan; its exterior displays a symmetrical five-bay facade with hip roof and twin chimneys. A denticulated main cornice and delicate window caps add decorative interest to the facade, while attention is drawn to the entrance by a columned porch with cove ceiling. The possibility exists that the northeast kitchen wing is Samuel Plumb's own dwelling house, built around 1740, and relegated to a minor role as an attached dependency by the subsequent construction of James Plumb's "Mansion House".

The large original condition of this house, together with its distinctive appearance and compatible site, makes it a notable example of early Federal style architecture in Middletown.

== Relationship to surroundings ==
This house faces south from the northeast corner of Westfield and East Streets. Tall shade trees shield the house from the nearby roads. Neighboring structures date from post-World War II development of this formerly rural area.
