= Old Middletown High School =

- U.S. National Register of Historic Places
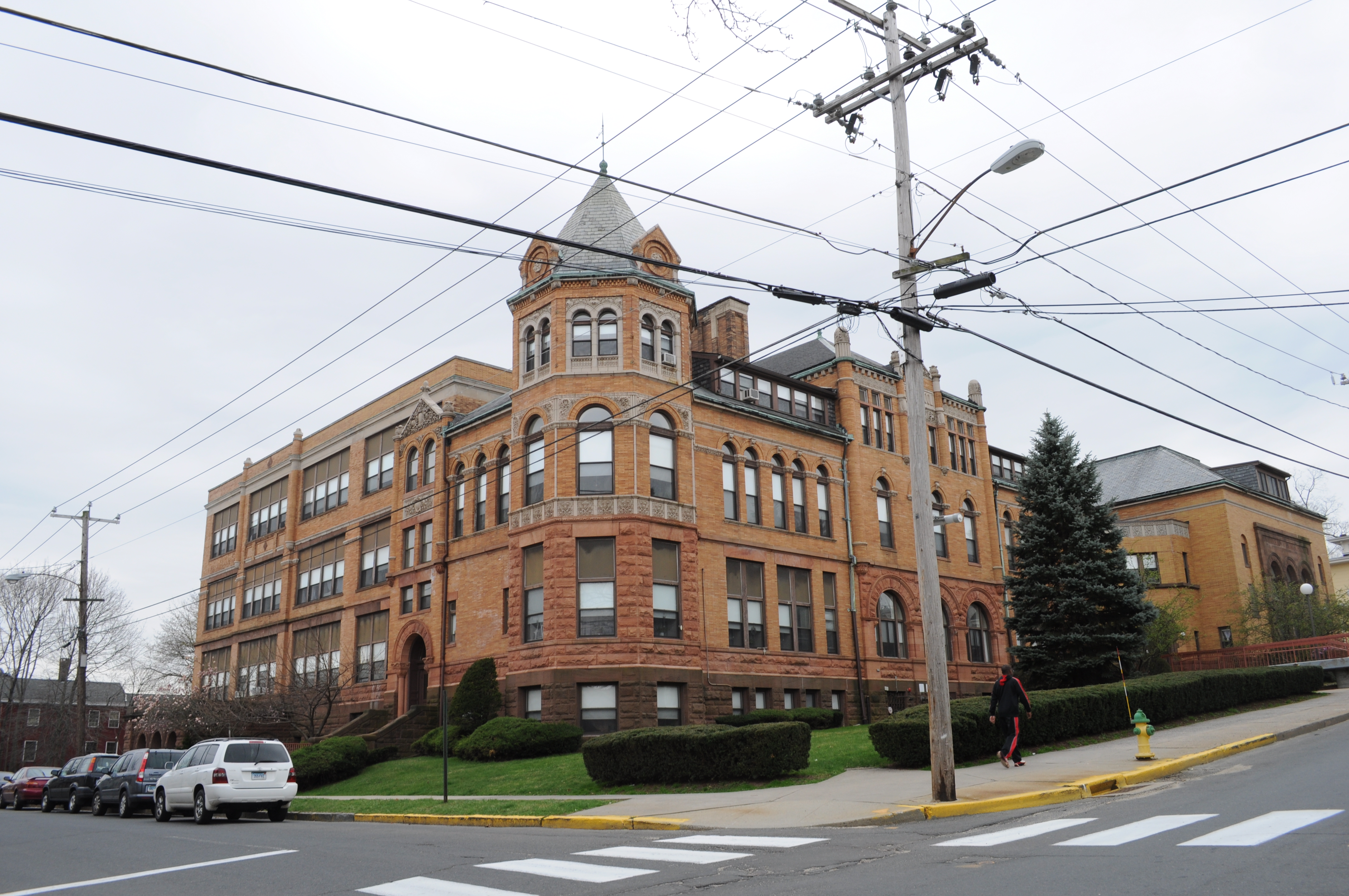
- Location: 251 Court Street, Middletown, Connecticut
- Coordinates: 41.5588°N 72.6532°W
- Built: 1894 - 1896; Jasper Tryon (carpenter); Watson Tryon & Son (masons)
- Architect: Curtis & Johnson, Hartford
- Architectural style: Romanesque Revival
- NRHP reference No.: 85001826
- Added to NRHP: August 23, 1985

The Old Middletown High School building in Middletown, Connecticut, in the United States, occupies the southwest corner of Court and Pearl streets. It is situated in a modestly scaled 19th century urban residential neighborhood. Although integrated into its surroundings, the old high school stands out because of its size and Romanesque Revival style.

== Significance ==
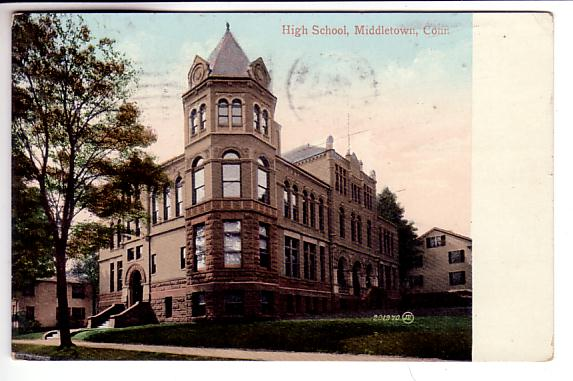
From a postcard sent in 1909

Built in 1894-1896, this building was Middletown's second high school. The Hartford firm of Curtis & Johnson designed the structure in Romanesque Revival style. The building for which no expense was spared in materials or design, set an innovative standard for the educational facilities of its day.

The use of different materials (Pompeian brick, brownstone, and terra cotta) produces a rich textural effect on the exterior. A turret on the northeast corner, the use of round compound arches, and an overall asymmetrical plan are typical of Romanesque Revival.

In 1912 a large wing designed by Charles Scranton Palmer of Meriden was added to the south side of the building. This wing closely repeated the materials and stylistic elements of the existing structure. A second large wing containing a library, auditorium, and gymnasium was added to the west side in 1931. Although it incorporates some Romanesque details such as sound compound arched windows and utilized materials compatible to the original, the overall impression is of a separate and distinct construction.

The old high school is one of the few monumental civic buildings of the 19th century remaining in Middletown and the only one of the Romanesque style. It ceased operation as a high school in 1973.

== Current use and condition ==
In 1978 the high school was converted into elderly housing apartments and the structure remains in good condition.

In 2007 Middletown High School #2 off of Newfield Street was replaced by MHS #3 that was built in front of MHS #2 before #2 was torn down. The old building is still elderly housing on the corner of Court and Pearl Streets.

== See also ==
- National Register of Historic Places listings in Middletown, Connecticut
