= Church of the Holy Trinity and Rectory (Middletown, Connecticut) =

Historic church in Connecticut, United States

- Church of the Holy Trinity and Rectory (Bishop Acheson House)
- U.S. National Register of Historic Places
- U.S. Historic district – Contributing property
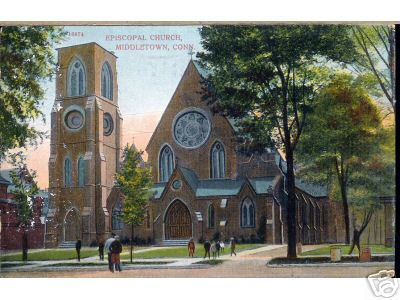

- Location within Connecticut Location within the United States
- Location: 381 Main Street(church) and 144 Broad Street(rectory), Middletown, Connecticut
- Coordinates: 41.562321°N 72.651001°W
- Built: 1870-1874 (church), 1902-1903 (rectory)
- Part of: Main Street Historic District (ID83001275)
- NRHP reference No.: 79002615

Significant dates
- Added to NRHP: September 14, 1979
- Designated CP: June 30, 1983

The Church of the Holy Trinity is an historic Episcopal church at 381 Main Street in Middletown, Connecticut. Completed in 1874, it is one of the city's finest examples of Gothic Revival architecture. Its nearby former rectory, also known as the Bishop Acheson House, is one of its finest Colonial Revival houses. The two buildings were listed on the National Register of Historic Places in 1979.

The church reported 275 members in 2015 and 127 members in 2025. Plate and pledge income for the congregation in 2025 was $203,658 with average Sunday attendance (ASA) of 66. This was a relative decrease from ASA of 98 persons reported in 2015.

== Church ==
=== Relationship to surroundings ===
This Gothic church at 381 Main Street faces east from the west side of Main Street on the central block between Court and Washington streets. it is set back from the street with a lawn in front. Its substantial appearance, emphasized by the sombre tones of the heavy brownstone construction, contrasts greatly with the flat facades and brightly decorated storefronts on Main Street.

=== Significance ===
The Episcopal Church in Middletown had its beginnings as early as 1724. Unlike many Colonial Anglican churches, it was firmly committed to the patriot cause during the American Revolution. This is the third meeting house of the parish, which was formally established as Christ Church in 1750. Several of its ministers have become bishops, including Abraham Jarvis, John Williams, and Edward Campion Acheson, father of Dean Acheson.

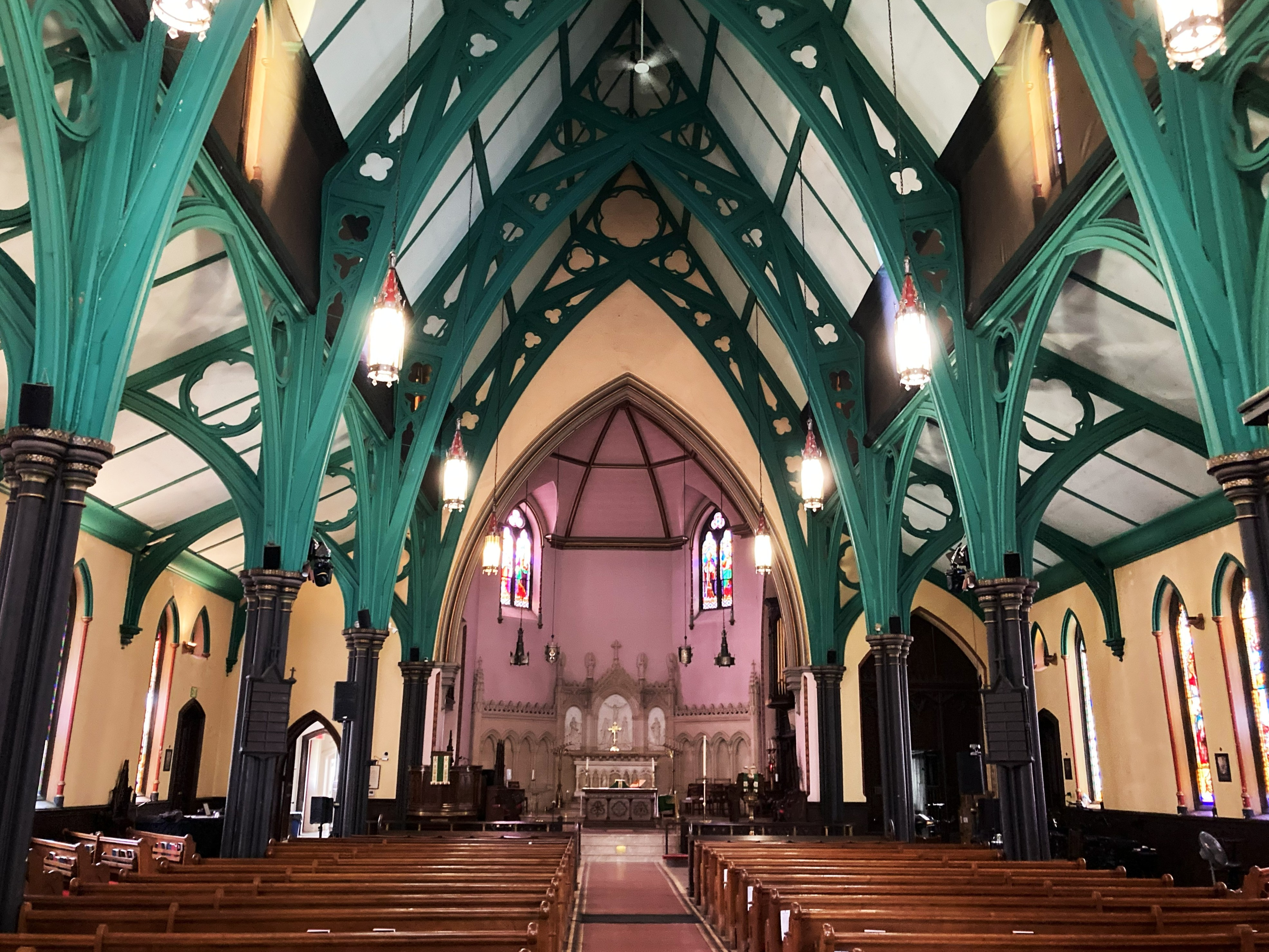
Church interior (2025)

The church was built in 1870–1874. Henry Dudley was the architect and the firm of McConochie, Moor and Mylechreest was the prime contractor. Constructed of local brownstone, this church displays a symmetrically arranged facade with a buttressed bell tower at the southeast corner. A large rose tracery window is the dominant decorative feature of this facade, which also displays arched and lancet windows. The tower lacks a spire but features narrow arched windows which emphasize its verticality, and echo the fenestration of the facades. The interior displays elaborate tracery trusses support on cast iron posts. The present altar and reredos were added around 1892 and were designed by Charles Haight of New York.

In the two decades following the American Civil War, a number of institutional buildings were constructed in the Gothic Revival style in Middletown. The design of this church is representative of that pattern.

Historical depictions of the church

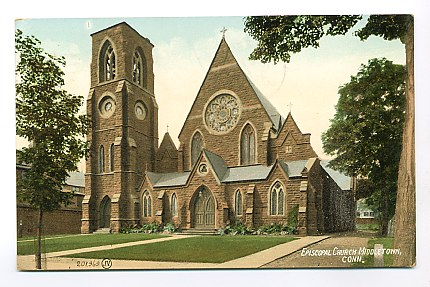
From a postcard sent in 1910

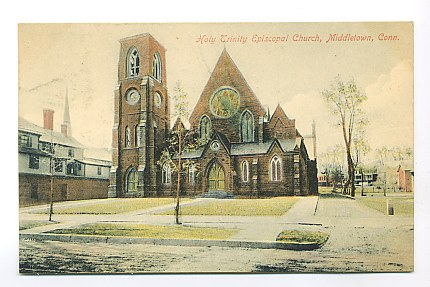
A more distant and perhaps earlier view (note the smaller trees) of the church than the first postcard, although this postcard was also sent in 1910

=== Current use and condition ===
The church continues to be used as a church and is in good condition. The restoration of most of the stained glass windows was completed in 2011. Its current rector is the Rev. Mary Russell Barnett. The church has an established partnership with Ekklesia Contemporary Ballet, a professional dance company composed of artist-theologians.

== Rectory ==
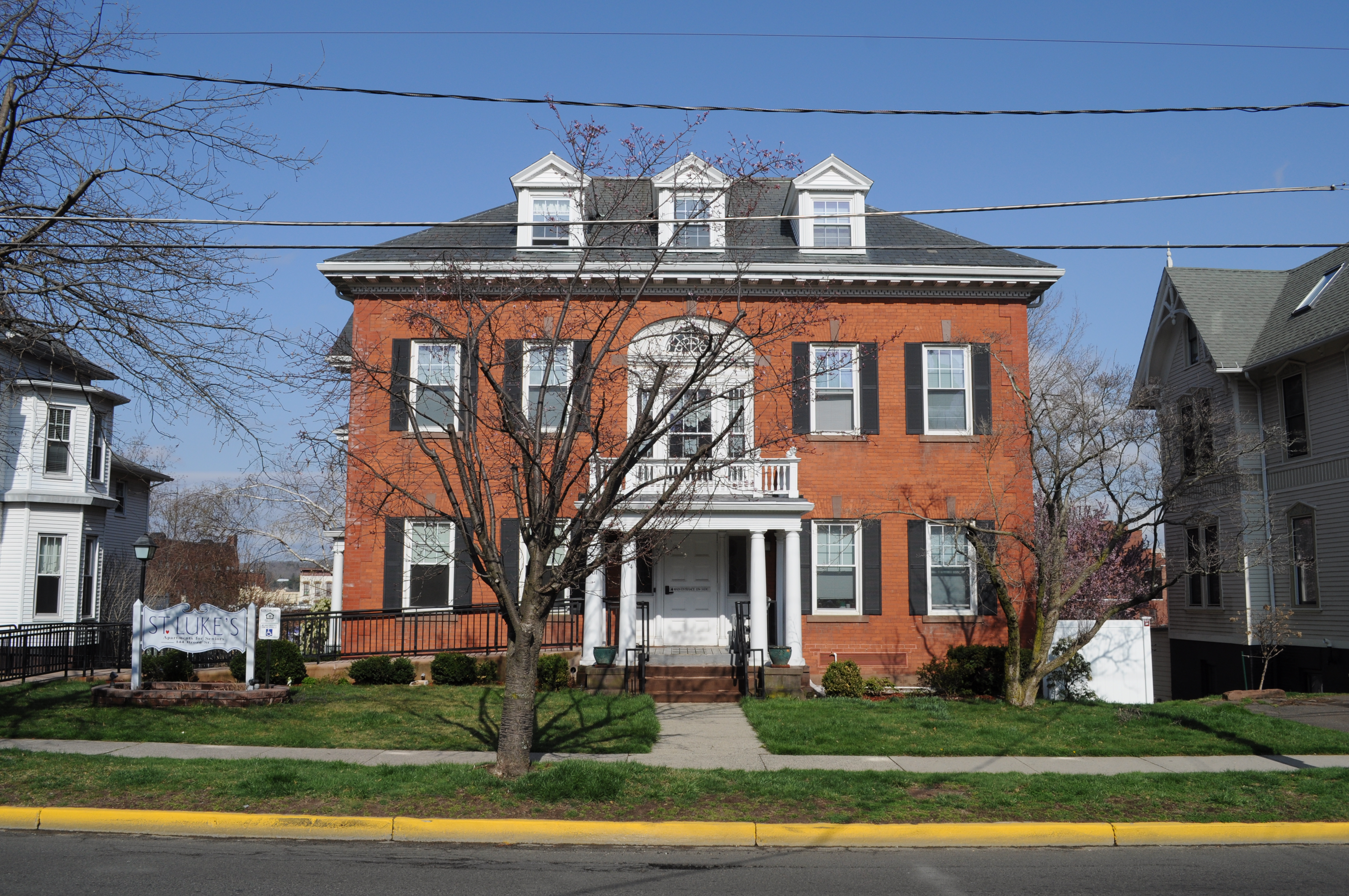
144 Broad Street, Middletown, Connecticut (2012)

The former rectory at 144 Broad Street, also known as the Bishop Acheson House, is now St. Luke's Housing for the Elderly. It is of the Colonial Revival style and was built in 1902–1903. The builder and architect are not known.

=== Relationship to surroundings ===
This large house is set back from the street on a large, well landscaped lot. The street is primarily residential with mid to late 19th century houses. Nearby are two small commercial buildings and the Gothic Revival Russell Library.

=== Significance ===
This house, built in 1902, was the third rectory of the Holy Trinity Church. The Reverend Edward Campion Acheson, the eighteenth rector of the church, was the first occupant. His son, Dean Acheson, served as Secretary of State under President Harry S. Truman. Upon the Reverend Mr. Acheson's resignation from the pulpit in 1915 he became the sixth Bishop of Connecticut. The house no longer serves as a rectory for Holy Trinity Church.

This large house is an excellent example of the Georgian Revival style, with well executed details: six column entrance portico with balustrade; Palladian window; and modillioned cornice.

=== Current use and condition ===
The building has been converted into an elderly residential apartments run by St. Luke's. The property is in very good condition.

== See also ==
- Broad Street Historic District (Middletown, Connecticut)
- National Register of Historic Places listings in Middletown, Connecticut
