= Jacob Pledger House =

Historic house in Connecticut, United States

- U.S. National Register of Historic Places
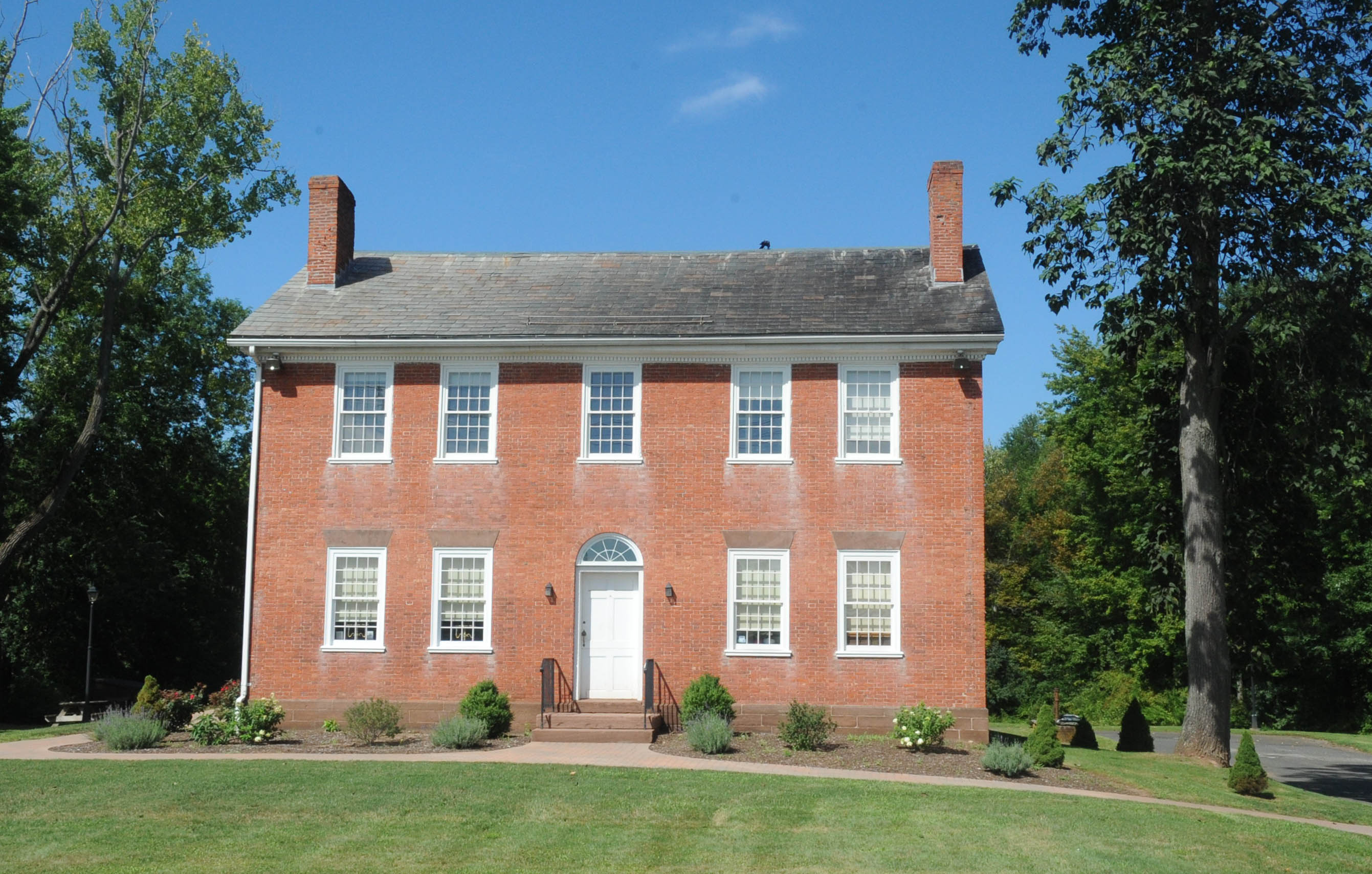
- In 2016

- Location within Connecticut Location within the United States
- Location: 717 Newfield Street; Middletown, Connecticut
- Coordinates: 41°34′43″N 72°40′22″W
- Area: 1.5 acres (0.61 ha)
- Built: 1803
- Architectural style: Federal
- NRHP reference No.: 82003773
- Added to NRHP: March 15, 1982

The Jacob Pledger House is a historic house at 717 Newfield Street in Middletown, Connecticut. Built in 1803, it is one of only five surviving brick Federal style houses in the city. It was listed on the National Register of Historic Places in 1982. It now houses professional offices.

== Description ==
The Jacob Pledger House is located in northern Middletown, on the west side of Newfield Street at its junction with La Rosa Lane. It is a 2 1/2-story masonry structure, built out of red brick and covered by a gabled roof with end chimneys. Its main facade is five bays wide, with symmetrically arranged windows and a center entrance. Ground floor windows are topped by brownstone lintels, and the entrance has a half-round transom window. The interior of the house has a number of original architectural features, most notably including its carved wooden staircase.

The house was built in 1803 by Jacob Pledger, on 80 acres (32 ha) of land originally belonging to his father-in-law. Pledger was an English immigrant who worked as an agent for a local brewery. The property was roughly bisected by Newfield Street, and remained in agricultural use until after World War II. Pledger sold the property in 1813 to Samuel Miller, whose descendants kept the property until 1953, when it was sold to the city for development. The city subsequently sold the house with covenants to protect its historic features.

== See also ==
- National Register of Historic Places listings in Middletown, Connecticut
