= Seth Wetmore House =

Historic house in Connecticut, United States

- U.S. National Register of Historic Places
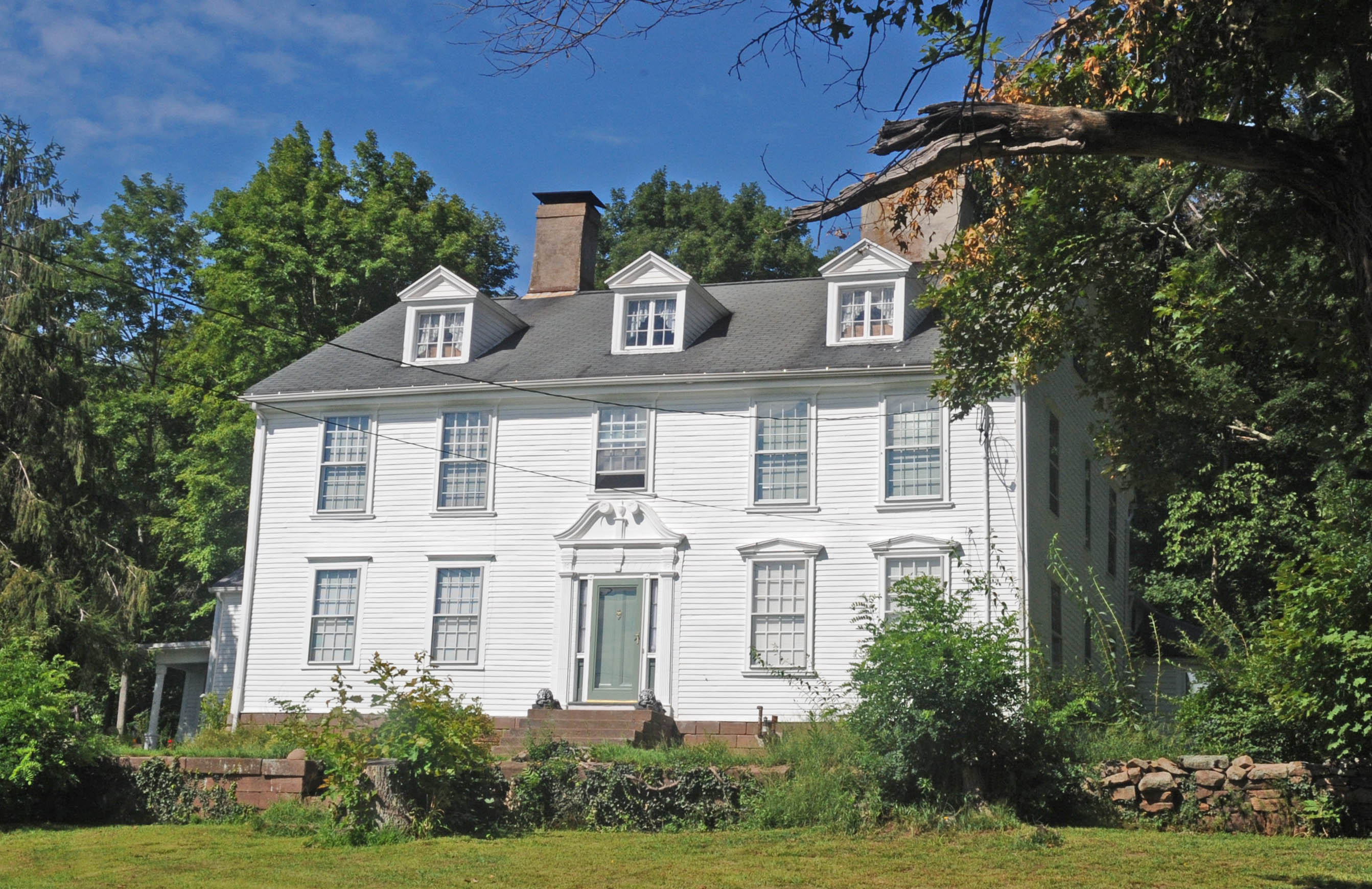
- In 2016

- Location within Connecticut Location within the United States
- Location: CT 66 and Camp Road, Middletown, Connecticut
- Coordinates: 41°33′9″N 72°41′19″W
- Area: less than one acre
- Built: 1742
- NRHP reference No.: 70000689
- Added to NRHP: September 10, 1970

The Seth Wetmore House is a residence built in the Center-Hall Colonial style in 1746 at 1066 Washington Street, Middletown, Connecticut. It was built of Clapboard siding, Brownstone foundation with asphalt shingle roof using a structural system of wood frame, post and beam with gable roof. It was added to the National Register of Historic Places on September 10, 1970.

== Relationship to Surroundings ==
This center-hall Colonial house faces east from the northwest corner of Washington Street Extension and Camp Street. From this site on the east slope of a ridge it commands a long view east. Although Washington Street Extension passes close by on the southwest, the house is obscured from view by thickly planted trees.

== Significance ==
Judge Seth Wetmore (1700–1788) built this house in 1746. Judge Wetmore served as deputy to the General Assembly for forty-eight terms, and was Judge of the County Court at Hartford. One of the local mansions of its day, it remains an example of Georgian architecture in Middletown. The interior features detailed appointments; the northeast parlor includes decoration such as a corner shell cupboard with sun-burst ornamentation, marbleized fluted pilasters on either side of the fireplace opening, and an overmantel painting. The woodwork in this room remains in its original condition.

Although the builder of this house is unknown, it is evident that he was a master joiner. A house recorded in a Colonial Dames monograph (William Cooper House, destroyed 1930d) bears such marked similarities to this house that it is likely they were built by the same man.

This house remained in the Wetmore family for over two hundred years, and there are many traditions concerning the house including visits by Jonathan Edwards, Timothy Dwight IV, Aaron Burr and General Lafayette. A large hemlock on the property is said to have been planted by Judge Wetmore's daughter Lucy.

The Judge Seth Wetmore House is significant for its long association with the Wetmore family and as Middletown's finest example of Georgian Colonial architecture.

== See also ==
- National Register of Historic Places listings in Middletown, Connecticut
