= Starr Mill =

- U.S. National Register of Historic Places
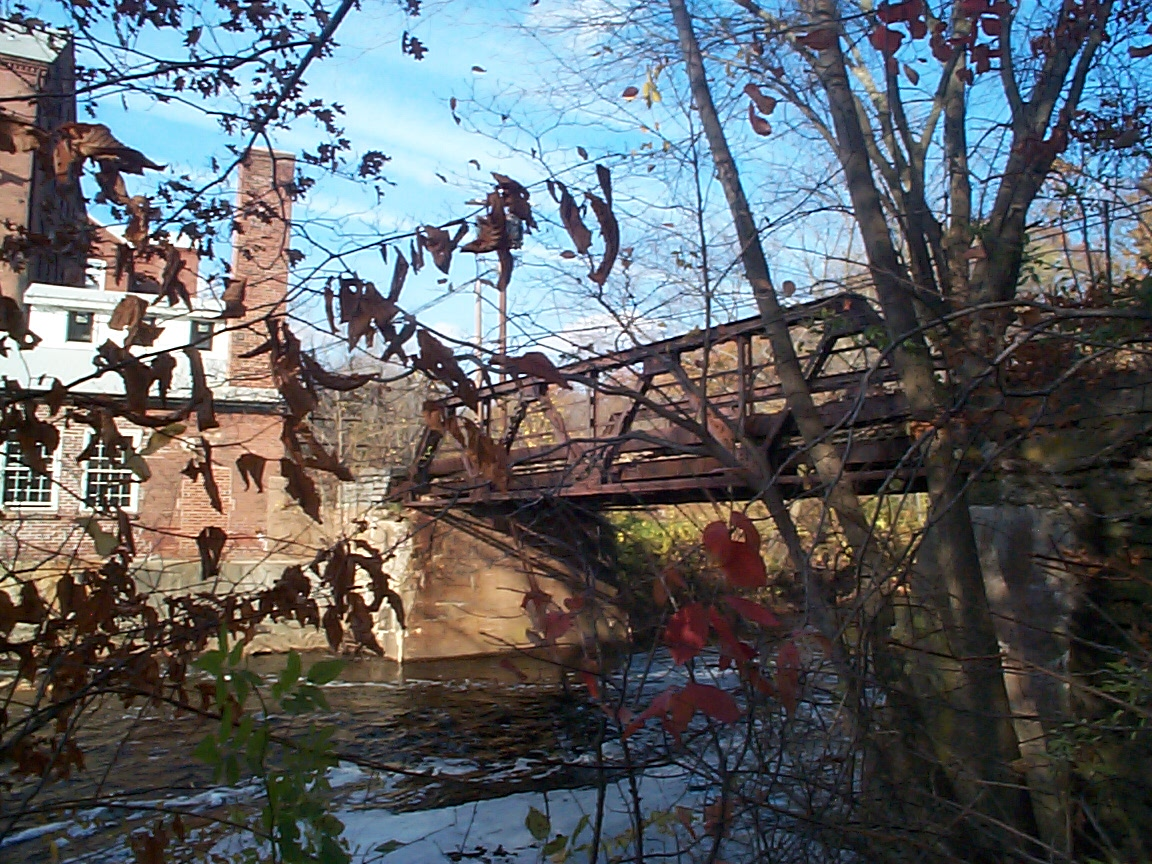
- Location: Junction of Middlefield Street and Beverly Heights; Middletown, Connecticut
- Coordinates: 41.5493°N 72.6770°W
- NRHP reference No.: 93001379
- Added to NRHP: December 14, 1993

Two 19th-century factory buildings are sited on a bank beside Starr Mill pond on Beverly Heights just off Middlefield Street. Each building is 3½ stories tall, and overlooks a picturesque pond and woods to the west; a parking lot packed with trucks and industrial equipment on the south; and nineteenth century housing on Beverly Heights to the north.

== Significance ==
Nathan Starr, Sr., a scythe manufacturer, purchased land on the West (no Coginchaug) River in Staddle Hill in 1799. Joined by his son, Nathan Jr. in 1812, Starr began the first of a long series of government contracts to produce swords, pistols, and eventually rifles. They constructed a factory here in 1812, which is probably the easternmost building sited by the pond. After Nathan Sr's death in 1821, his son carried on the business until 1845. During this period some 70,000 arms of varied kinds were made here, as well as a number of commemorative swords for national heroes, such as Andrew Jackson.

From 1845 to 1864 the factory was relatively inactive. In the latter year the Russell Manufacturing Company bought the property; in 1865 they erected the building immediately to the west of the original plant in a similar height, scale, material, and style. This was an auxiliary operation, complementing the main South Farms factories; Russell conducted manufacturing here for some ninety years. A plumbing products firm and then a lighting fixture company ran short-lived manufacturing operations here; the facilities were vacant in the late 1960s. Joseph J. Vinci bought the property in 1971. Several small businesses currently operate here, including a cabinetmaker, garment shop and welding outfit.

The Starr Mill is an archetypical nineteenth-century mill: a tall, many-windowed brick building beside a mill pond. There have been few major exterior alterations. Rounded-arched brownstone sluiceways (now bricked up) run beneath the building. On each end of the building three gable end chimney stacks terminate in the attic. Artifacts from former functions of the mill abound. A late 19th-century turbine lies in the water near the southeastern corner of the earlier building.

This complex is a well-preserved and significant industrial site which has been successfully adapted to light manufacturing uses. The buildings are presently used for mixed use of retail, office, artist studios, professional service space and storage. The structures are well maintained.

== See also ==
- Starr Mill Road Bridge
- National Register of Historic Places listings in Middlesex County, Connecticut

== Sources ==
- Middletown, Connecticut Historical and Architectural Resources. Volume II, Card Number 8. Roger Sherman. September, 1978.
