= Starr Mill Road Bridge =

- U.S. National Register of Historic Places
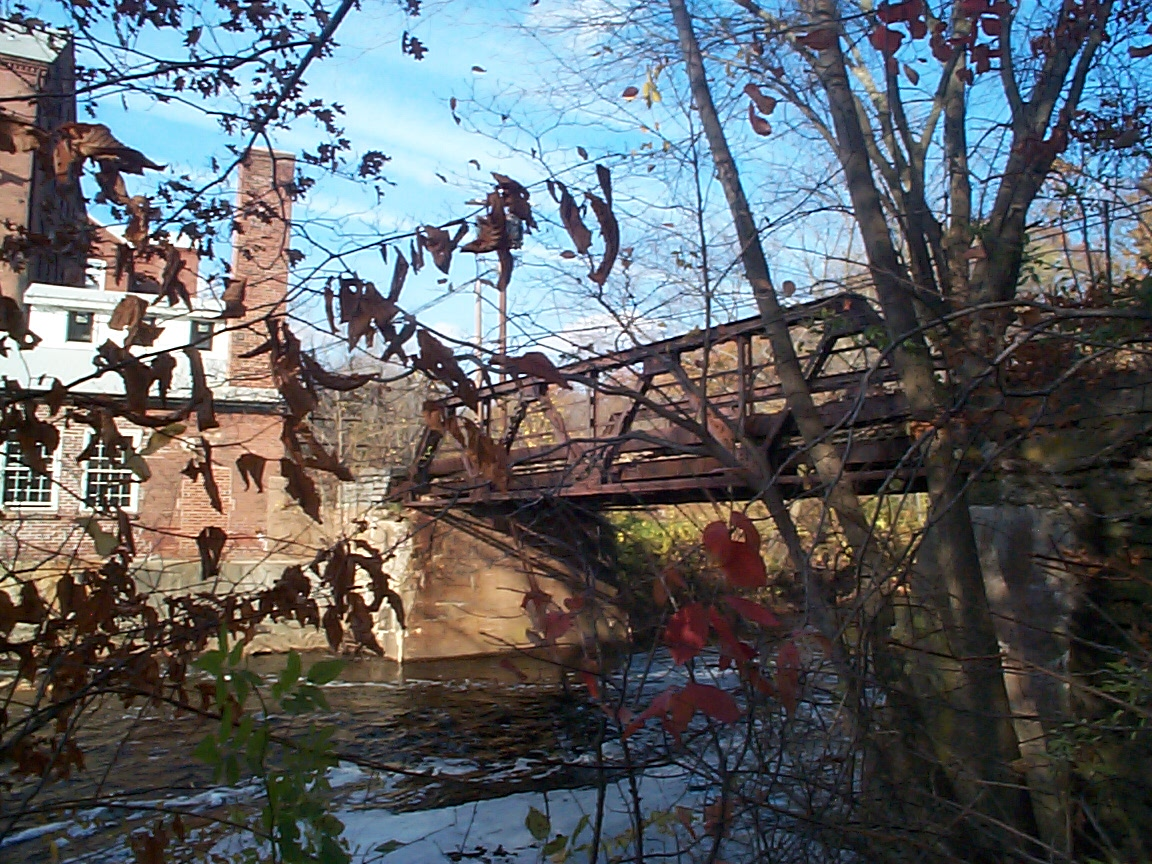
- Starr Mill Bridge spanning the Coginchaug River
- Location: Starr Mill Road across the Cochinaug River; Middletown, Connecticut
- Coordinates: 41.54899°N 72.67667°W
- Area: less than one acre
- Built: 1927
- Architectural style: Warren through truss
- NRHP reference No.: 93001344
- Added to NRHP: December 10, 1993

The Starr Mill Road Bridge is a historic bridge in Middletown, Connecticut. It is a single span Warren through truss bridge, spanning the Coginchaug River near the Starr Mill complex on the west bank of the river. Built in 1927 by the Berlin Construction Company, it is one of a shrinking number of period metal truss bridges in the state. The bridge was listed on the National Register of Historic Places in 1993. It is closed to all forms of passage.

== Description and history ==
The Starr Mill Road Bridge is located in western Middletown, spanning the Coginchaug River just below (east of) the Starr Mill dam. It is accessible via Middlefield Road (Connecticut Route 157) on the south, and Beverly Heights, the mill access road, on the north. The bridge is 46 feet (14 m) long with a roadway 14 feet (4.3 m) wide, and stands about 12 feet (3.7 m) above the river on concrete abutments, which were poured over rubble abutments of earlier bridges. The bridge deck and structure are in deteriorating condition.

The bridge was built by the city in 1927, as a part of a bridge-building program in the outer portions of the city. The bridge was constructed by the Berlin Construction Company, one of Connecticut's leading bridge makers of the early 20th century. The company was created by principals of the Berlin Iron Bridge Company after that company was merged into the American Bridge Company, and continued to be a major regional supplier of bridge trusses until they were broadly supplanted in road engineering practices by steel girder bridges. The bridge has an unusual combination of riveted and bolted joints, an indication of the difficulty of performing riveting in the field.

== See also ==
- National Register of Historic Places listings in Middlesex County, Connecticut
- List of bridges on the National Register of Historic Places in Connecticut
