= Preserve at Sharp Mountain =

The Preserve at Sharp Mountain may refer to:

== Places ==
- The Preserve, a 963-acre open space preserve in Connecticut USA.

== See also ==
- Sharp Mountain, in eastern central Pennsylvania USA.
