= Col. Asa Platt House =

Historic house in Connecticut, United States

- U.S. National Register of Historic Places
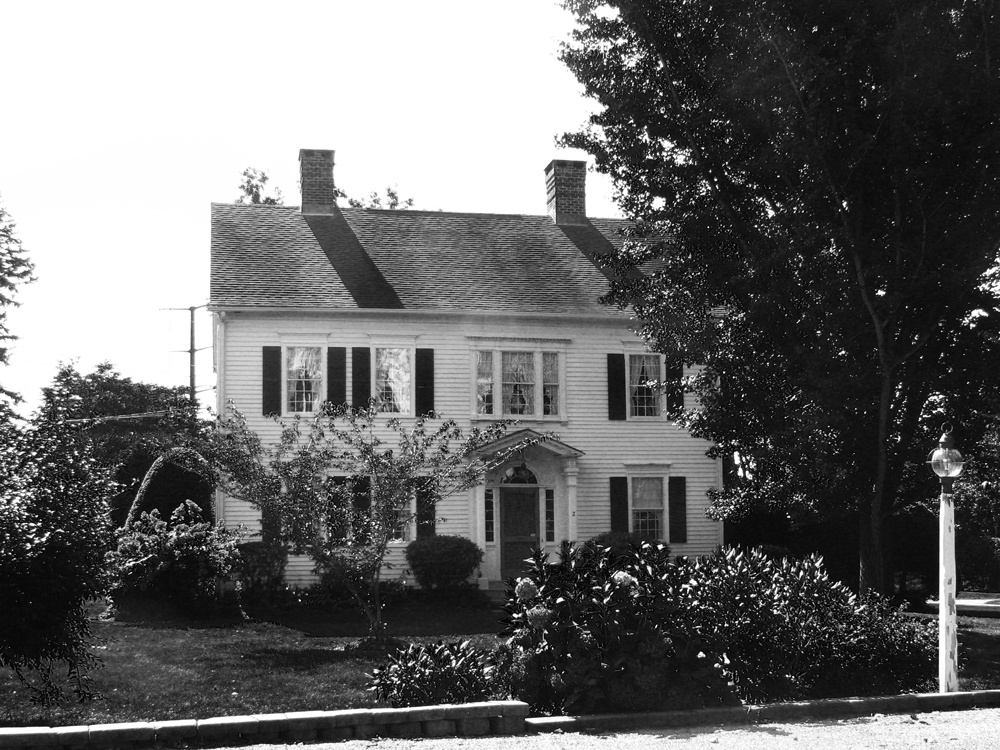

- Location within Connecticut Location within the United States
- Location: 2 Tyler City Road, Orange, Connecticut
- Coordinates: 41°17′12″N 73°00′41″W
- Area: 1.8 acres (0.73 ha)
- Built: 1811
- Built by: David Hoadley (attributed)
- Architectural style: Federal
- NRHP reference No.: 02001630
- Added to NRHP: December 31, 2002

The Colonel Asa Platt House is a historic house at 2 Tyler City Road in Orange, Connecticut. Built about 1811, it is a high-quality example of Federal period architecture, which is likely the work of New Haven builder David Hoadley. It was listed on the National Register of Historic Places in 2002.

== Description and history ==
The Colonel Asa Platt House stands in a predominantly suburban residential area northeast of the town center of Orange, at the southwest corner of Tyler City Road and Racebrook Road (Connecticut Route 114). It is a 2 1/2-story wood-frame structure, with a gabled roof, two interior chimneys, and a clapboarded exterior. The main facade is four bays wide, with an irregular arrangement consisting of two closely spaced windows bays on the left half, a single window bay on the right, and the main entrance set off-center between these groupings. It is framed by sidelights, pilasters, and a half-round transom window, and is sheltered by a gabled portico supported by chamfered square posts. Above the entrance is a three-part window with narrow sash windows on either side of a larger central one. Its elements are articulated by slender pilasters, and both the sill and cornice of the grouping are bracketed. The fine woodwork continues inside, with arched openings framing the staircase and hall, and original builtin cabinetry.

The house was probably built not long after Asa Platt purchased the land on which it stands in 1810. Passed to his unmarried daughters, it was eventually taken by the town for taxes, and served for a time as its poor farm. In 1847, the town sold it to William Russell, in whose family it remained in the late 20th century. The house's design is attributed to David Hoadley on account of its exceptionally fine detailing and workmanship, and by comparison to the few documented residential works of the builder.

== See also ==
- National Register of Historic Places listings in New Haven County, Connecticut
