= 2018 Food City 300 =

22nd race of the 2018 NASCAR Xfinity Series

Race details
- Race 22 of 33 of the 2018 NASCAR Xfinity Series
- Date: August 17, 2018
- Official name: 37th Annual Food City 300
- Location: Bristol, Tennessee, Bristol Motor Speedway
- Course: Permanent racing facility
- Course length: 0.533 miles (0.858 km)
- Distance: 310 laps, 165.23 mi (265.912 km)
- Scheduled distance: 300 laps, 159.9 mi (257.334 km)
- Average speed: 82.306 miles per hour (132.459 km/h)

Pole position
| Driver | Kyle Busch | Joe Gibbs Racing |
- Time: 15.389

Most laps led
| Driver | Kyle Larson | Chip Ganassi Racing |
- Laps: 202

Winner
| No. 42 | Kyle Larson | Chip Ganassi Racing |

Television in the United States
- Network: NBCSN
- Announcers: Rick Allen, Jeff Burton, Steve Letarte, Dale Earnhardt Jr.

Radio in the United States
- Radio: Performance Racing Network

The 2018 Food City 300 was the 22nd stock car race of the 2018 NASCAR Xfinity Series season, and the 37th iteration of the event. The race was held on Friday, August 17, 2018, in Bristol, Tennessee at Bristol Motor Speedway, a 0.533 miles (0.858 km) permanent oval-shaped racetrack. The race was extended from its scheduled 300 laps to 310 laps due to a NASCAR overtime finish. At race's end, Kyle Larson of Chip Ganassi Racing would be able to hold off Joe Gibbs Racing driver Christopher Bell and JR Motorsports driver Justin Allgaier on the overtime restart to win his 12th NASCAR Xfinity Series win and his fourth and final win of his part-time season. Bell and Allgaier would fill the podium, finishing second and third, respectively.

== Background ==
The layout of Bristol Motor Speedway, the venue where the race was held.

The Bristol Motor Speedway, formerly known as Bristol International Raceway and Bristol Raceway, is a NASCAR short track venue located in Bristol, Tennessee. Constructed in 1960, it held its first NASCAR race on July 30, 1961. Despite its short length, Bristol is among the most popular tracks on the NASCAR schedule because of its distinct features, which include extraordinarily steep banking, an all concrete surface, two pit roads, and stadium-like seating. It has also been named one of the loudest NASCAR tracks.

=== Entry list ===
| # | Driver | Team | Make | Sponsor |
|---|---|---|---|---|
| 0 | Garrett Smithley | JD Motorsports | Chevrolet | Flex Tape |
| 00 | Cole Custer | Stewart-Haas Racing with Biagi-DenBeste | Ford | Haas Automation |
| 1 | Elliott Sadler | JR Motorsports | Chevrolet | OneMain Financial "Lending Done Human" |
| 01 | Vinnie Miller | JD Motorsports | Chevrolet | Flex Glue |
| 2 | Matt Tifft | Richard Childress Racing | Chevrolet | Nexteer |
| 3 | Ty Dillon | Richard Childress Racing | Chevrolet | Cabela's, Bass Pro Shops |
| 4 | Ross Chastain | JD Motorsports | Chevrolet | Flex Seal |
| 5 | Michael Annett | JR Motorsports | Chevrolet | Pilot Flying J |
| 7 | Justin Allgaier | JR Motorsports | Chevrolet | Brandt Professional Agriculture |
| 8 | Ray Black Jr. | B. J. McLeod Motorsports | Chevrolet | Isokern Fireplaces & Chimmeys |
| 9 | Tyler Reddick | JR Motorsports | Chevrolet | Food City "Value. Everyday." |
| 11 | Ryan Truex | Kaulig Racing | Chevrolet | LeafFilter Gutter Protection |
| 12 | Austin Cindric | Team Penske | Ford | Pirtek |
| 13 | Timmy Hill | MBM Motorsports | Toyota | MBM Motorsports |
| 15 | B. J. McLeod | JD Motorsports | Chevrolet | JD Motorsports |
| 16 | Ryan Reed | Roush Fenway Racing | Ford | DriveDownA1C.com |
| 18 | Kyle Busch | Joe Gibbs Racing | Toyota | NOS Energy Drink |
| 19 | Brandon Jones | Joe Gibbs Racing | Toyota | Juniper Networks |
| 20 | Christopher Bell | Joe Gibbs Racing | Toyota | Rheem |
| 21 | Daniel Hemric | Richard Childress Racing | Chevrolet | South Point Hotel, Casino & Spa |
| 22 | Joey Logano | Team Penske | Ford | Snap-on |
| 23 | Chase Elliott | GMS Racing | Chevrolet | Ollie's Bargain Outlet |
| 35 | Joey Gase | Go Green Racing with SS-Green Light Racing | Chevrolet | Sparks Energy |
| 36 | Alex Labbé | DGM Racing | Chevrolet | DGM Racing |
| 38 | Jeff Green | RSS Racing | Chevrolet | C2 Freight Resources |
| 39 | Ryan Sieg | RSS Racing | Chevrolet | Cook's Comfort Systems |
| 40 | Chad Finchum | MBM Motorsports | Toyota | Smithbilt Homes, The Preserve |
| 42 | Kyle Larson | Chip Ganassi Racing | Chevrolet | DC Solar |
| 45 | Josh Bilicki | JP Motorsports | Toyota | Prevagen |
| 51 | Jeremy Clements | Jeremy Clements Racing | Chevrolet | RepairableVehicles.com |
| 52 | David Starr | Jimmy Means Racing | Chevrolet | Chasco |
| 55 | Bayley Currey | JP Motorsports | Toyota | Prevagen |
| 60 | Chase Briscoe | Roush Fenway Racing | Ford | Ford |
| 66 | Carl Long | MBM Motorsports | Chevrolet | CrashClaimsR.Us |
| 74 | Stephen Leicht | Mike Harmon Racing | Chevrolet | Shadow Warriors Project, Horizon Transport |
| 76 | Spencer Boyd | SS-Green Light Racing | Chevrolet | Grunt Style "This We'll Defend" |
| 78 | Jairo Avila Jr. | B. J. McLeod Motorsports | Chevrolet | CorvetteParts.net, ART General Contractor |
| 89 | Morgan Shepherd | Shepherd Racing Ventures | Chevrolet | Visone RV, Racing with Jesus |
| 90 | Josh Williams | DGM Racing | Chevrolet | Sleep Well Sleep Disorder Specialists |
| 93 | J. J. Yeley | RSS Racing | Chevrolet | RSS Racing |
Official entry list

== Practice ==
=== First practice ===
The first practice session would occur on Thursday, August 16, at 10:05 AM EST, and would last for 50 minutes. Kyle Larson of Chip Ganassi Racing would set the fastest time in the session, with a time of 15.442 and an average speed of 124.259 miles per hour (199.975 km/h).

| Pos. | # | Driver | Team | Make | Time | Speed |
|---|---|---|---|---|---|---|
| 1 | 42 | Kyle Larson | Chip Ganassi Racing | Chevrolet | 15.442 | 124.259 |
| 2 | 18 | Kyle Busch | Joe Gibbs Racing | Toyota | 15.474 | 124.002 |
| 3 | 20 | Christopher Bell | Joe Gibbs Racing | Toyota | 15.503 | 123.770 |
Full first practice results

=== Second and final practice ===
The second and final practice session, sometimes referred to as Happy Hour, would occur on Thursday, August 16, at 1:35 PM EST, and would last for 50 minutes. Christopher Bell of Joe Gibbs Racing would set the fastest time in the session, with a time of 15.603 and an average speed of 122.976 miles per hour (197.911 km/h).

| Pos. | # | Driver | Team | Make | Time | Speed |
|---|---|---|---|---|---|---|
| 1 | 20 | Christopher Bell | Joe Gibbs Racing | Toyota | 15.603 | 122.976 |
| 2 | 42 | Kyle Larson | Chip Ganassi Racing | Chevrolet | 15.616 | 122.874 |
| 3 | 18 | Kyle Busch | Joe Gibbs Racing | Toyota | 15.628 | 122.780 |
Full Happy Hour practice results

== Qualifying ==
Qualifying was held on Friday, August 17, at 3:40 PM EST. Since Bristol Motor Speedway is under 2 miles (3.2 km), the qualifying system was a multi-car system that included three rounds. The first round was 15 minutes, where every driver would be able to set a lap within the 15 minutes. Then, the second round would consist of the fastest 24 cars in Round 1, and drivers would have 10 minutes to set a lap. Round 3 consisted of the fastest 12 drivers from Round 2, and the drivers would have 5 minutes to set a time. Whoever was fastest in Round 3 would win the pole.

Kyle Busch of Joe Gibbs Racing would win the pole, setting a time of 15.389 and an average speed of 124.686 miles per hour (200.663 km/h).

No drivers would fail to qualify.

=== Full qualifying results ===
| Pos. | # | Driver | Team | Make | Time (R1) | Speed (R1) | Time (R2) | Speed (R2) | Time (R3) | Speed (R3) |
|---|---|---|---|---|---|---|---|---|---|---|
| 1 | 18 | Kyle Busch | Joe Gibbs Racing | Toyota | 15.617 | 122.866 | 15.367 | 124.865 | 15.389 | 124.686 |
| 2 | 20 | Christopher Bell | Joe Gibbs Racing | Toyota | 15.796 | 121.474 | 15.629 | 122.772 | 15.476 | 123.986 |
| 3 | 42 | Kyle Larson | Chip Ganassi Racing | Chevrolet | 15.591 | 123.071 | 15.660 | 122.529 | 15.514 | 123.682 |
| 4 | 22 | Joey Logano | Team Penske | Ford | 15.880 | 120.831 | 15.544 | 123.443 | 15.515 | 123.674 |
| 5 | 2 | Matt Tifft | Richard Childress Racing | Chevrolet | 15.647 | 122.631 | 15.593 | 123.055 | 15.557 | 123.340 |
| 6 | 1 | Elliott Sadler | JR Motorsports | Chevrolet | 15.888 | 120.770 | 15.687 | 122.318 | 15.586 | 123.110 |
| 7 | 19 | Brandon Jones | Joe Gibbs Racing | Toyota | 15.927 | 120.475 | 15.611 | 122.913 | 15.602 | 122.984 |
| 8 | 3 | Ty Dillon | Richard Childress Racing | Chevrolet | 15.698 | 122.232 | 15.714 | 122.108 | 15.667 | 122.474 |
| 9 | 00 | Cole Custer | Stewart-Haas Racing with Biagi-DenBeste | Ford | 15.736 | 121.937 | 15.648 | 122.623 | 15.675 | 122.411 |
| 10 | 7 | Justin Allgaier | JR Motorsports | Chevrolet | 15.735 | 121.945 | 15.717 | 122.084 | 15.764 | 121.720 |
| 11 | 21 | Daniel Hemric | Richard Childress Racing | Chevrolet | 15.755 | 121.790 | 15.672 | 122.435 | 15.785 | 121.558 |
| 12 | 11 | Ryan Truex | Kaulig Racing | Chevrolet | 15.848 | 121.075 | 15.768 | 121.689 | 15.808 | 121.382 |
Eliminated in Round 2
| 13 | 60 | Chase Briscoe | Roush Fenway Racing | Ford | 16.060 | 119.477 | 15.768 | 121.689 | — | — |
| 14 | 9 | Tyler Reddick | JR Motorsports | Chevrolet | 16.035 | 119.663 | 15.769 | 121.682 | — | — |
| 15 | 23 | Chase Elliott | GMS Racing | Chevrolet | 15.949 | 120.308 | 15.820 | 121.290 | — | — |
| 16 | 16 | Ryan Reed | Roush Fenway Racing | Ford | 16.006 | 119.880 | 15.824 | 121.259 | — | — |
| 17 | 12 | Austin Cindric | Team Penske | Ford | 15.865 | 120.945 | 15.874 | 120.877 | — | — |
| 18 | 4 | Ross Chastain | JD Motorsports | Chevrolet | 16.018 | 119.790 | 15.935 | 120.414 | — | — |
| 19 | 51 | Jeremy Clements | Jeremy Clements Racing | Chevrolet | 16.078 | 119.343 | 15.958 | 120.241 | — | — |
| 20 | 36 | Alex Labbé | DGM Racing | Chevrolet | 16.031 | 119.693 | 15.992 | 119.985 | — | — |
| 21 | 39 | Ryan Sieg | RSS Racing | Chevrolet | 16.096 | 119.210 | 16.059 | 119.484 | — | — |
| 22 | 5 | Michael Annett | JR Motorsports | Chevrolet | 15.796 | 121.474 | — | — | — | — |
| 23 | 15 | B. J. McLeod | JD Motorsports | Chevrolet | 16.143 | 118.863 | — | — | — | — |
| 24 | 8 | Ray Black Jr. | B. J. McLeod Motorsports | Chevrolet | 16.249 | 118.087 | — | — | — | — |
Eliminated in Round 1
| 25 | 0 | Garrett Smithley | JD Motorsports | Chevrolet | 16.282 | 117.848 | — | — | — | — |
| 26 | 35 | Joey Gase | Go Green Racing with SS-Green Light Racing | Chevrolet | 16.284 | 117.833 | — | — | — | — |
| 27 | 78 | Jairo Avila Jr. | B. J. McLeod Motorsports | Chevrolet | 16.286 | 117.819 | — | — | — | — |
| 28 | 90 | Josh Williams | DGM Racing | Chevrolet | 16.323 | 117.552 | — | — | — | — |
| 29 | 38 | Jeff Green | RSS Racing | Chevrolet | 16.342 | 117.415 | — | — | — | — |
| 30 | 40 | Chad Finchum | MBM Motorsports | Toyota | 16.389 | 117.079 | — | — | — | — |
| 31 | 13 | Timmy Hill | MBM Motorsports | Toyota | 16.530 | 116.080 | — | — | — | — |
| 32 | 52 | David Starr | Jimmy Means Racing | Chevrolet | 16.542 | 115.996 | — | — | — | — |
| 33 | 93 | J. J. Yeley | RSS Racing | Chevrolet | 16.646 | 115.271 | — | — | — | — |
Qualified by owner's points
| 34 | 01 | Vinnie Miller | JD Motorsports | Chevrolet | 16.720 | 114.761 | — | — | — | — |
| 35 | 76 | Spencer Boyd | SS-Green Light Racing | Chevrolet | 16.779 | 114.357 | — | — | — | — |
| 36 | 66 | Carl Long | MBM Motorsports | Chevrolet | 16.793 | 114.262 | — | — | — | — |
| 37 | 45 | Josh Bilicki | JP Motorsports | Toyota | 17.027 | 112.692 | — | — | — | — |
| 38 | 55 | Bayley Currey | JP Motorsports | Toyota | 17.060 | 112.474 | — | — | — | — |
| 39 | 74 | Stephen Leicht | Mike Harmon Racing | Chevrolet | 17.091 | 112.270 | — | — | — | — |
| 40 | 89 | Morgan Shepherd | Shepherd Racing Ventures | Chevrolet | 17.460 | 109.897 | — | — | — | — |
Official qualifying results
Official starting lineup

== Race results ==
Stage 1 Laps: 85

| Pos. | # | Driver | Team | Make | Pts |
|---|---|---|---|---|---|
| 1 | 42 | Kyle Larson | Chip Ganassi Racing | Chevrolet | 0 |
| 2 | 3 | Ty Dillon | Richard Childress Racing | Chevrolet | 0 |
| 3 | 23 | Chase Elliott | GMS Racing | Chevrolet | 0 |
| 4 | 22 | Joey Logano | Team Penske | Ford | 0 |
| 5 | 00 | Cole Custer | Stewart-Haas Racing with Biagi-DenBeste | Ford | 6 |
| 6 | 2 | Matt Tifft | Richard Childress Racing | Chevrolet | 5 |
| 7 | 9 | Tyler Reddick | JR Motorsports | Chevrolet | 4 |
| 8 | 7 | Justin Allgaier | JR Motorsports | Chevrolet | 3 |
| 9 | 1 | Elliott Sadler | JR Motorsports | Chevrolet | 2 |
| 10 | 21 | Daniel Hemric | Richard Childress Racing | Chevrolet | 1 |

Stage 2 Laps: 85

| Pos. | # | Driver | Team | Make | Pts |
|---|---|---|---|---|---|
| 1 | 42 | Kyle Larson | Chip Ganassi Racing | Chevrolet | 0 |
| 2 | 7 | Justin Allgaier | JR Motorsports | Chevrolet | 9 |
| 3 | 23 | Chase Elliott | GMS Racing | Chevrolet | 0 |
| 4 | 11 | Ryan Truex | Kaulig Racing | Chevrolet | 7 |
| 5 | 1 | Elliott Sadler | JR Motorsports | Chevrolet | 6 |
| 6 | 9 | Tyler Reddick | JR Motorsports | Chevrolet | 5 |
| 7 | 20 | Christopher Bell | Joe Gibbs Racing | Toyota | 4 |
| 8 | 19 | Brandon Jones | Joe Gibbs Racing | Toyota | 3 |
| 9 | 5 | Michael Annett | JR Motorsports | Chevrolet | 2 |
| 10 | 3 | Ty Dillon | Richard Childress Racing | Chevrolet | 0 |

Stage 3 Laps: 130

| Fin | St | # | Driver | Team | Make | Laps | Led | Status | Pts |
|---|---|---|---|---|---|---|---|---|---|
| 1 | 3 | 42 | Kyle Larson | Chip Ganassi Racing | Chevrolet | 310 | 202 | running | 0 |
| 2 | 2 | 20 | Christopher Bell | Joe Gibbs Racing | Toyota | 310 | 18 | running | 39 |
| 3 | 10 | 7 | Justin Allgaier | JR Motorsports | Chevrolet | 310 | 0 | running | 46 |
| 4 | 9 | 00 | Cole Custer | Stewart-Haas Racing with Biagi-DenBeste | Ford | 310 | 5 | running | 39 |
| 5 | 4 | 22 | Joey Logano | Team Penske | Ford | 310 | 2 | running | 0 |
| 6 | 6 | 1 | Elliott Sadler | JR Motorsports | Chevrolet | 310 | 12 | running | 39 |
| 7 | 22 | 5 | Michael Annett | JR Motorsports | Chevrolet | 310 | 0 | running | 32 |
| 8 | 15 | 23 | Chase Elliott | GMS Racing | Chevrolet | 310 | 2 | running | 0 |
| 9 | 14 | 9 | Tyler Reddick | JR Motorsports | Chevrolet | 310 | 0 | running | 37 |
| 10 | 5 | 2 | Matt Tifft | Richard Childress Racing | Chevrolet | 310 | 0 | running | 32 |
| 11 | 21 | 39 | Ryan Sieg | RSS Racing | Chevrolet | 310 | 0 | running | 26 |
| 12 | 18 | 4 | Ross Chastain | JD Motorsports | Chevrolet | 309 | 0 | running | 25 |
| 13 | 19 | 51 | Jeremy Clements | Jeremy Clements Racing | Chevrolet | 308 | 0 | running | 24 |
| 14 | 17 | 12 | Austin Cindric | Team Penske | Ford | 308 | 0 | running | 23 |
| 15 | 8 | 3 | Ty Dillon | Richard Childress Racing | Chevrolet | 307 | 0 | running | 0 |
| 16 | 25 | 0 | Garrett Smithley | JD Motorsports | Chevrolet | 305 | 0 | running | 21 |
| 17 | 16 | 16 | Ryan Reed | Roush Fenway Racing | Ford | 304 | 0 | running | 20 |
| 18 | 26 | 35 | Joey Gase | Go Green Racing with SS-Green Light Racing | Chevrolet | 304 | 0 | running | 19 |
| 19 | 23 | 15 | B. J. McLeod | JD Motorsports | Chevrolet | 304 | 0 | running | 18 |
| 20 | 27 | 78 | Jairo Avila Jr. | B. J. McLeod Motorsports | Chevrolet | 304 | 0 | running | 17 |
| 21 | 32 | 52 | David Starr | Jimmy Means Racing | Chevrolet | 303 | 0 | running | 16 |
| 22 | 12 | 11 | Ryan Truex | Kaulig Racing | Chevrolet | 302 | 0 | running | 22 |
| 23 | 20 | 36 | Alex Labbé | DGM Racing | Chevrolet | 301 | 0 | running | 14 |
| 24 | 11 | 21 | Daniel Hemric | Richard Childress Racing | Chevrolet | 300 | 0 | crash | 14 |
| 25 | 35 | 76 | Spencer Boyd | SS-Green Light Racing | Chevrolet | 299 | 0 | running | 12 |
| 26 | 29 | 38 | Jeff Green | RSS Racing | Chevrolet | 298 | 0 | fuel pump | 11 |
| 27 | 38 | 55 | Bayley Currey | JP Motorsports | Toyota | 288 | 0 | running | 0 |
| 28 | 28 | 90 | Josh Williams | DGM Racing | Chevrolet | 278 | 0 | suspension | 9 |
| 29 | 7 | 19 | Brandon Jones | Joe Gibbs Racing | Toyota | 260 | 0 | suspension | 11 |
| 30 | 30 | 40 | Chad Finchum | MBM Motorsports | Toyota | 195 | 0 | crash | 7 |
| 31 | 39 | 74 | Stephen Leicht | Mike Harmon Racing | Chevrolet | 192 | 0 | overheating | 6 |
| 32 | 34 | 01 | Vinnie Miller | JD Motorsports | Chevrolet | 179 | 0 | transmission | 5 |
| 33 | 36 | 66 | Carl Long | MBM Motorsports | Chevrolet | 174 | 0 | suspension | 4 |
| 34 | 13 | 60 | Chase Briscoe | Roush Fenway Racing | Ford | 142 | 0 | crash | 3 |
| 35 | 37 | 45 | Josh Bilicki | JP Motorsports | Toyota | 102 | 0 | transmission | 2 |
| 36 | 1 | 18 | Kyle Busch | Joe Gibbs Racing | Toyota | 74 | 69 | crash | 0 |
| 37 | 24 | 8 | Ray Black Jr. | B. J. McLeod Motorsports | Chevrolet | 36 | 0 | engine | 1 |
| 38 | 31 | 13 | Timmy Hill | MBM Motorsports | Toyota | 22 | 0 | overheating | 1 |
| 39 | 40 | 89 | Morgan Shepherd | Shepherd Racing Ventures | Chevrolet | 12 | 0 | vibration | 1 |
| 40 | 33 | 93 | J. J. Yeley | RSS Racing | Chevrolet | 9 | 0 | brakes | 1 |
Official race results

| Previous race: 2018 Rock N Roll Tequila 170 | NASCAR Xfinity Series; 2018 season | Next race: 2018 Johnsonville 180 |
