= Russell Military Academy =

Mid-1800s college/military preparatory school

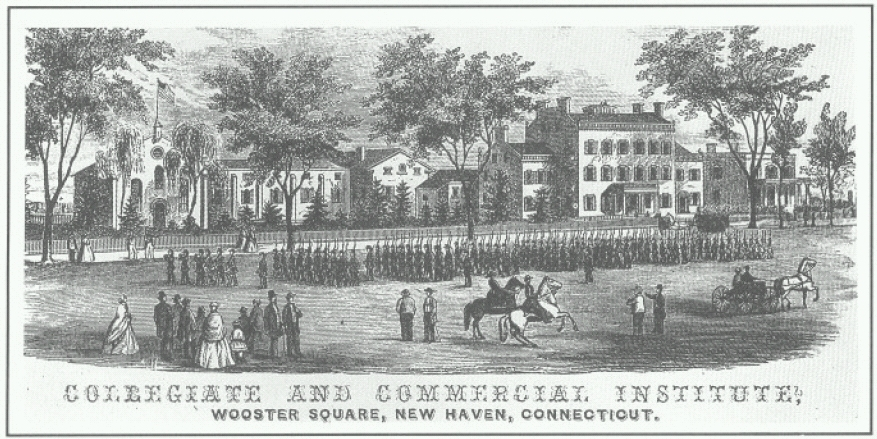
New Haven Collegiate and Commercial Institute in 1860

The New Haven Collegiate and Commercial Institute (later to be popularly known as the Russell Military Academy) was founded by Stiles French in 1834 and is a defunct military academy and college preparatory school that "fitted" students to apply for entrance to nearby Yale or West Point, as well as offering classes in business skills like book-keeping. The school was located at Wooster Square in New Haven, Connecticut, United States, about a mile from the Yale campus.

Founded by Stiles French after the break-up of Round Hill School, where he had been a faculty member, the school took over the large building formerly occupied by the Young Ladies Institute, opened in 1830 by Ray Palmer and E. A. Andrews, on the east side of Wooster Square, where Sarah Porter (later to found Miss Porter's School), and General Russell's future wife were students. Although Stiles French and his son Truman French continued to be involved with the school for many years, it was taken over in September 1836 by William Huntington Russell, a recent Yale graduate and school teacher who later became a well-known citizen of Connecticut as a non-practicing graduate of the Yale Medical School and as a representative of New Haven in the state legislature of Connecticut. Russell at first leased the school from the Frenches and eventually bought it outright.

Charles Ray Palmer, writing in 1908 when the school was long closed and the derelict and decrepit main building, constructed in 1829 for the use of the Young Ladies Institute, was still standing, gives the following description. "The structure was of brick and consisted of a main building of three or three and one-half stories with two wings of two stories, the whole frontage being about one hundred feet. The interior arrangements were on a liberal scale, and well adapted to the purpose for which they were designed." The lot was deep and over time Russell added additional buildings and a chapel, while he lived in a house on an adjoining lot. The boys drilled in Wooster Park across the street. Most of the school's students were local New Haven residents, but as the number of boarding students increased Russell rented a nearby house and converted it into a dormitory, and some students found accommodations in New Haven boarding houses. It was difficult for Russell to enforce school discipline on the boys who lived off campus in boarding houses and some boys took to smoking, drinking and carousing at night with Yale students. In the mid-1850s the school's population was 130 students and 12 instructors, the majority of the instructors being recent Yale graduates.

Although the school was opened as a family school for older boys, both day students and boarding, under the leadership of Russell it gradually assumed the character of a military school while continuing to offer both a traditional classical curriculum in Latin and Greek and a modern English language curriculum including courses in natural science, mathematics, history, and modern languages. The school's curriculum centered on a three-year course for older boys preparing for college. Not all of the boys were prepping for college and there were classes in practical skills like surveying, and courses for students preparing for a business career, but all students participated in daily military drill wearing cadet uniforms. The school eventually became known familiarly as the Russell Military Academy. In 1862 Russell, who was active in the recruitment and organizing of Connecticut regiments, received a political appointment to the post of adjutant-general of the Connecticut state militia, with the rank of major general, and was thenceforth popularly known as "General Russell," and the school as "General Russell's school" or "General Russell's military academy."

By about 1840, Russell introduced a very thorough military drill and discipline into his school. He foresaw the American Civil War in the future and wanted to make sure his boys were prepared to fight for the Union. During the American Civil War, the school of 130 to 160 pupils furnished more than one hundred officers for the Union Army, as well as many drill masters and volunteers. A small number of the school's graduates chose to fight for the South, including William Eugene Webster, the grandson of Noah Webster, who joined Lee's army in Virginia as a lieutenant, while his brother, his classmate at the Collegiate and Commercial Institute, served on the opposite side of the battlefield as a lieutenant in McClellan's Union army. Although the Websters were a New Haven family loyal to the Northern cause, the boys' mother, a grand-daughter of Martha Washington, was a proud Virginia belle loyal to the South. Their parents quarreled and separated over the war, the older boy siding with his mother and the younger sticking with his father. Lt. William E. Webster was killed in the fighting at the epic Seven Days Battle east of Richmond in 1862, and his brother, after heroic labors as the acting head of a company of engineers on the Union side in the same battle, fell mortally ill of exposure and died 43 days later.

By the time of Russell's death in 1885, the school had become well known and had graduated around 4,000 boys. Since the Collegiate and Commercial Institute, inspired by the example of Round Hill, was one of the first schools in the United States to introduce physical training in a school and to start a gymnasium, these features attracted many boys from every part of the country. A detailed account of the gymnasium, with a floor plan and drawings of the equipment, appeared in The American Journal of Education in 1860.

The school closed for good, without fanfare, shortly after Russell's death.

On May 30, 1879, Society of Kappa Psi, which later became Kappa Psi pharmaceutical fraternity, was started on the campus of Russell Military Academy by F. Harvey Smith.

== Notable alumni ==
- Leonard Woolsey Bacon, Congregationalist clergyman
- Thomas Gray Bennett, president of the Winchester Repeating Arms Company
- Frank Howe Bradley, geologist
- E. Warren Clark, American educator in Meiji Japan
- Ira Davenport, New York congressman
- Charles DeKay, author, editor, critic
- William Wade Dudley, politician
- Daniel Cady Eaton, botanist
- Carlos French, Connecticut congressman
- Bertram Goodhue, architect
- William Henry Goodyear, first curator of the Metropolitan Museum of Art
- Ethan Allen Hitchcock, Secretary of the Interior
- Henry Holt, publisher
- Bronson Howard, dramatist
- Brayton Ives, financier
- Charles D. Lanier, financier
- Fred Ewing Lewis, Pennsylvania congressman
- Selden E. Marvin, Adjutant General of New York
- George Anderson Mercer, lawyer and Confederate Army lieutenant
- Victor H. Metcalf, Secretary of the Navy, Secretary of Commerce and Labor
- William Chester Minor, lexicographer
- Frederic Courtland Penfield, diplomat
- Morton F. Plant, financier
- John Addison Porter, secretary to president William McKinley
- Raphael Pumpelly, geologist and explorer
- Col. Thomas E. Rose, Union officer and mastermind of the Libby Prison Escape
- Eugene Schuyler, diplomat, scholar, writer, explorer
- Charlemagne Tower Jr., diplomat
- William Wirt Winchester, treasurer and chief shareholder in the Winchester Repeating Arms Company

== Notable faculty ==
- Franklin Bowditch Dexter
- Charles Pomeroy Otis
