= Tangoe =

American expense management software company

Tangoe, Inc.
- Type: Private
- Founded: February 14, 2000; 26 years ago in Orange, Connecticut
- Headquarters: Indianapolis, Indiana, United States
- Key people: James Parker, CEO
- Website: tangoe.com

Tangoe, Inc. is an American provider of technology expense management software, specialising in telecom expense management, managed mobility services and cloud cost management. Founded in 2000 and headquartered in Orange, Connecticut, the company serves enterprise customers seeking to manage and reduce expenditure on telecommunications, mobile devices and cloud services. Tangoe had its initial public offering in 2011 and was taken private by Marlin Equity Partners in 2017 for $242.6 million.

== History ==
The company was founded in 2000 and had its initial public offering in 2011. The company was then taken private in 2017 by Marlin Equity Partners for $242.6 million in cash. Tangoe was then combined with another Marlin portfolio company, Asentinel.

=== SEC Fraud Probe ===
On September 4, 2018, the SEC brought charges for improperly recognizing approximately $40 million in revenue by violating provisions of the federal securities laws. A settlement of $1.5 million in penalties for the company, as well as an additional $100,000, $50,000, and $20,000 in penalties was reached between the former CEO, former CFO, and former Vice President of Finance respectively. On September 10, 2020, the SEC obtains final judgment against the remaining defendant and former Senior VP, Donald J. Farias, for an additional $20,000 in penalties and bars him serving as an officer or director of a public company for five years.

== Acquisitions ==
In 2009, Tangoe acquired InterNoded Inc, a mobile device managed services provider.

In 2018, the company acquired mobility management company MOBI Wireless Management.
