= Frank Howe Bradley =

American geologist

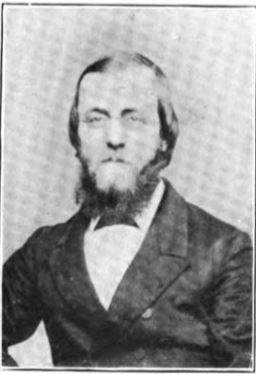
Frank Howe Bradley

Frank Howe Bradley (September 20, 1838 – March 27, 1879) was an American geologist.

Bradley, son of Abijah and Eliza Collis (Townsend) Bradley, was born in New Haven, Conn., September 20, 1838.

He graduated from Yale College in 1863. Through his undergraduate course he was partially employed in teaching in Gen. Russel's Collegiate and Commercial Institute in New Haven, at which school he was himself fitted for college. In the year 1863-4 he taught in Hartford, Conn., and spent the next year as a student in the Chemical Laboratory of the Sheffield Scientific School. His tastes early led him to the study of geology, and up to this time his vacations had been largely spent in the field in making collections of fossils. In the summer of 1865 he went to the Isthmus of Darien, and spent a year in that vicinity, obtaining large collections of corals and other zoological specimens, partly for the Yale Museum. During 1867 and 1868, he was assistant geologist in the Illinois survey, and in November of the latter year, became Professor of Natural Sciences in Hanover College, at Hanover, Ind. In September 1869, he left this position to accept the Professorship of Mineralogy and Geology in East Tennessee University, at Knoxville, and while there made some valuable geological explorations, which included the discovery of the fern named for him, Asplenium bradleyi. He resigned this position in 1875, with the hope of so adding to his resources that he might be able with freedom to pursue his favorite science; and to this end he undertook the development of a gold mine in Northern Georgia, where he met his death from the falling of a bank in a gold mine, near Nacoochee, Ga., March 27, 1879

Professor Bradley was married, July 15, 1867, to Sarah M. Bolles; she survived him, with one daughter, two children having died earlier, and one on the day of his own death.
