= Russell Library =

Russell Library may refer to:

- Richard B. Russell Library for Political Research and Studies, on the campus of the University of Georgia in Athens
- Russell Library (Middletown, Connecticut), a Gothic Revival building near the Church of the Holy Trinity and Rectory
- Russell Library (St Patrick's College), Maynooth, Ireland
