= Stiles French =

American educator (1801–1881)

- Born: December 6, 1801; Bethany, Connecticut, U.S.
- Died: May 9, 1881 (aged 79); New Haven, Connecticut, U.S.
- Education: Yale College
- Occupation: Educator
- Children: 2

Stiles French (December 6, 1801 – May 9, 1881) was an American teacher and founder of the New Haven Collegiate and Commercial Institute, later known as the Russell Military Academy.

== Early life ==
Stiles French was born on December 6, 1801, in Bethany, a parish of Woodbridge, Connecticut, to Anna (née Johnson) and David French. At the age of 17, he taught at a district school and in the spring of 1823, he prepared for college. He graduated from Yale College in 1827. Following graduation, he pursued advanced scientific studies at Yale for two or three years.

== Career ==
French was a math teacher at "New Haven Gymnasium" from the spring of 1828 to the spring of 1831. He then became a mathematics teacher at Round Hill School in Northampton, Massachusetts, and remained there for two years. In August 1833, he established the Collegiate and Commercial Institute at Wooster Square in New Haven with his brother Truman French. He remained with the school for 12 years and it was later sold to William Huntington Russell and became the Russell Military Academy. He also helped layout Wooster Square and its park. He later established the Classical and Scientific School for Boys on Wall Street in New Haven. The school was a preparatory school for Yale and the U.S. Military and Naval Academies. He remained with that institution for over 25 years. Around 1875, French retired and moved to Northampton. He returned to New Haven in 1880.

== Personal life ==
French married twice. He had a son and daughter with his second wife. His son Charles drowned in 1869 while attending Yale College.

French died of a kidney disease on May 9, 1881, at his home on Trumbull Street in New Haven.
