= Wheeler-Beecher House =

- U.S. National Register of Historic Places
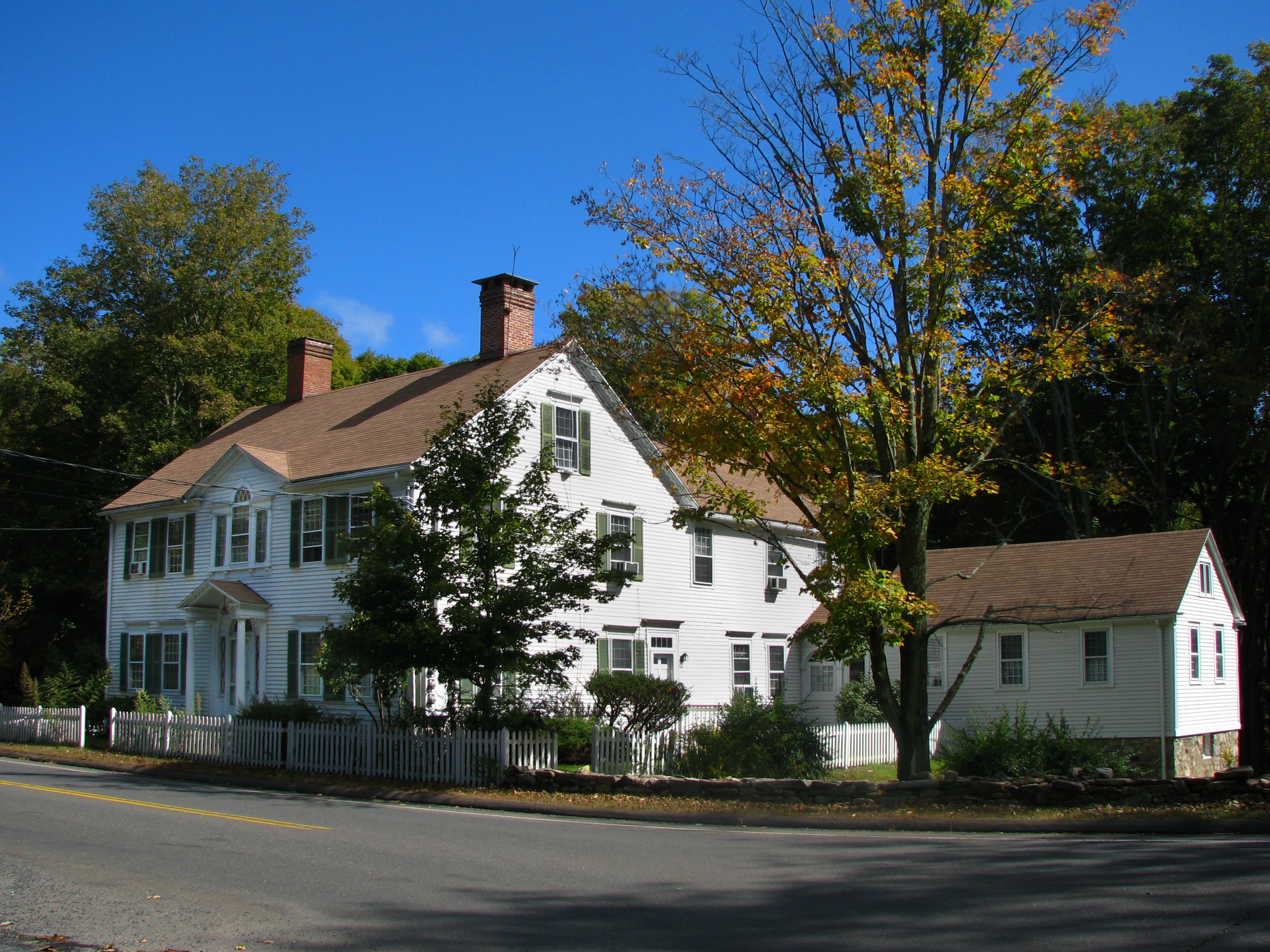

- Location within Connecticut Location within the United States
- Location: 562 Amity Road, Bethany, Connecticut
- Coordinates: 41°25′42″N 72°59′44″W
- Area: 1.5 acres (0.61 ha)
- Built: 1807
- Architect: Hoadley, David
- Architectural style: Federal
- NRHP reference No.: 77001400
- Added to NRHP: July 15, 1977

The Wheeler-Beecher House is a historic house at 562 Amity Road Connecticut Route 63 in Bethany, Connecticut. Built in 1807, it is a good example of Federal period architecture, designed by New Haven architect David Hoadley. The house was listed on the National Register of Historic Places in 1977.

== Description and history ==
The Wheeler-Beecher House stands in the rural community of Bethany, at the northeast corner of Amity Road (Connecticut Route 63) and Hilldale Road. It is a 2 1/2-story wood-frame structure, with a gabled roof and clapboarded exterior. An integral two-story ell extends to the rear, and the roof is pierced by a pair of brick chimneys. The main facade is five bays wide, with the main entrance in the center bay. It is flanked by sidelight windows and topped by a radiating fanlight with scalloped trim. The entry is sheltered by a gabled portico with an open pediment and side entablatures supported by round columns. Above the entry is a Palladian window, its elements separated by narrow pilasters. Its side windows are topped by corniced entablatures; the remaining front windows are simple sash windows topped by cornices. The interior follows a typical center hall plan, which has been partly compromised by a historical conversion of the building into apartments.

The house was built in 1807 for Darius Beecher, about whom little is known. It was designed and built by David Hoadley a builder and designer from New Haven who is best known in the region for his churches. For much of the 19th century the house was owned by the Wheeler family. It was also historically used as a gathering place: the second floor of the ell houses a ballroom which was used by local churches for events.

== See also ==
- National Register of Historic Places listings in New Haven County, Connecticut
