= Wooster Island =

Island in Orange, Connecticut, U.S.

Wooster Island is an island in the Housatonic River in Orange, Connecticut.

The island is uninhabited, but is used for duck hunting. Fishing is legal and considered safe, though shellfishing is not allowed or recommended due to contamination and oxygen depletion. The southernmost tip of the island is considered the northernmost limit of salt water in the river.

== Physical characteristics ==
41°16′50″N 73°04′58″W

- The island is approximately half-way north of Great Flat Island in Milford, and south of Two Mile Island in Shelton.
- Elevation: ~39 feet (12 m)
- The water quality surrounding the island is known to contain Escherichia coli.

== Transportation ==
All transportation to and from the island is by boat. It is illegal to operate a boat from the northern to southern tip of the island at speeds greater than "Slow-No-Wake".
