= Samuel Wadsworth Russell House =

Historic house in Connecticut, United States

- Samuel Russell House
- U.S. National Register of Historic Places
- U.S. National Historic Landmark
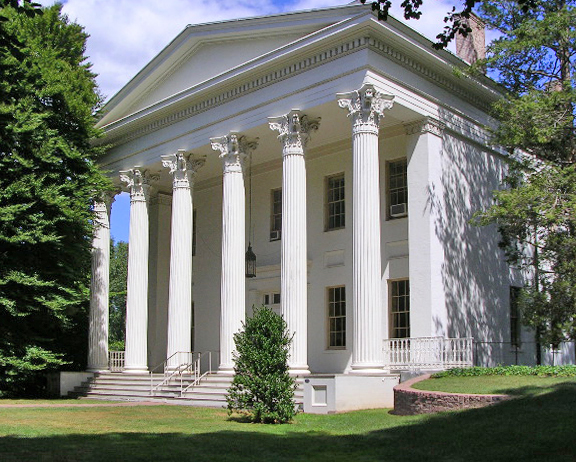
- Samuel Russell House

- Location within Connecticut Location within the United States
- Location: 350 High Street, Middletown, Connecticut
- Coordinates: 41°33′36.88″N 72°39′20.01″W
- Area: 2 acres (0.81 ha)
- Built: 1828
- Architect: Ithiel Town; David Hoadley
- Architectural style: Greek Revival
- NRHP reference No.: 70000688

Significant dates
- Added to NRHP: October 6, 1970
- Designated NHL: August 7, 2001

The Samuel Russell House is a neoclassical house at 350 High Street in Middletown, Connecticut, built in 1828 to a design by architect Ithiel Town. Many architectural historians consider it to be one of the finest Greek Revival mansions in the northeastern United States. Town's client was Samuel Russell (1789-1862), the founder of Russell & Company, the largest and most important American firm to do business in the China trade in the 19th century.

The house was listed on the National Register of Historic Places in 1970, and designated as a National Historic Landmark in 2001. It has been owned by Wesleyan University since 1937 and now houses the Department of Philosophy.

== Description and significance ==
This building was erected in 1828 for Samuel Russell (1789–1862). Russell founded the trading firm of Russell & Company in Canton, China, after serving there as trading representative of the Providence, Rhode Island firm of Edward Carrington & Company. Between 1818 and 1831 Russell made his fortune in the illegal yet highly profitable importation of Turkish and Bengal opium into the port of Canton, and the exportation of fine teas and silks from there to Europe and the United States. In 1828 when his house was built, Russell was in Canton. His friend Samuel D. Hubbard worked with his wife, Mrs. Russell, to supervise the construction of the house. In 1831 Russell returned to Middletown and his new home, where he resided until his death in 1862.

The Russell House was designed by Ithiel Town, one of the period's foremost architects and major proponent of the Greek Revival style in America. David Hoadley (of Curtis and Hoadley), a prominent New Haven builder-architect, supervised the construction. The house has the form of a Greek temple with six full-height Corinthian columns supporting a heavy entablature and low flushboarded pediment. The front (west) wall has five bays with recessed panels between the first and second story windows except in the center bay, where pilasters support a high entablature over the double entrance door. This doorway is surrounded by side and overlights whose frames are decorated with fretwork. The windows on the two-bay side facades are separated vertically by panels like those on the front. Stucco scribed to resemble large-block ashlar covers the brick masonry walls. The house has a brownstone foundation supporting load-bearing masonry walls and a gable roof.

An antemion decorative motif is used on the portico column capitals, front corner pilasters, and in the attic window screen covers. The heavy entablature has three bands in the architrave; a band of foliated molding under the plain frieze; and a denticulated cornice defined by a bead and reel molding and an elaborate crown molding. Around 1855 the rear portico was enclosed and is now divided by six pilasters (originally square pillars) into five bays of windows with small protruding balconies in the end bays. A two-story north wing, added around 1855, is attributed to Alexander Jackson Davis, a former partner of Ithiel Town. Although not consistent with the symmetry of the whole, it is treated sympathetically through the use of identical pilasters and entablature.

The Russell estate occupied all of the block bounded by High, Court, Pearl and Washington streets. Extensive grounds behind Russell House, sloping down to Pearl Street, were planted with formal gardens, which included boxwood imported from England and plants brought from China by Samuel Russell. A double stair of intricate ironwork was added to the rear of the house at the time the portico was enclosed. It leads from the first floor down to the garden lawn.

The interior is divided by a spacious center hall with two rooms on either side. A stairway with landing is at the end of the hall. The four chimney stacks are placed in the outside wall of each of the rooms off the hall. The south parlors communicate through a set of folding doors, while the original north rooms have been opened up to provide a single large space.

Close attention to detail characterizes the decorative treatment throughout the interior. Trompe-l'œil wall paintings simulate panelling on the walls of the north main rooms, entrance hall, and stairwell. Similarly elaborate decoration is seen in the marble fireplaces, with Ionic columns supporting the mantelpieces, and in the recessed panelling of the doors and folding window shutters. A wide frieze and deep cornice of decorative plaster define the high ceilings of the interior.

The Russell House represents a significant stage in the development of Greek Revival architecture in America. In his work Town and Davis, Architects, Roger Hale Newton mentions the Russell House as "indicative of the hand of Town in its undeniable sophistication." Professor Talbot Hamlin places its design "in the richest Greek vein" and also states that "its Corinthian columns and open plan are urban and magnificent rather than in the simple old tradition." Newton elaborates on the latter point when he says that the communicating suite of parlors with their grand scale "may have reflected an urban development quite contrary... to the prevailing modern provincial places."

The Russell House demonstrates an early attempt by Ithiel Town to match the sophisticated design of an imposing Greek temple form with a compatible interior plan suited to living and entertaining on a grand scale. This plan was used in Town and Davis' later work in New York. Its successful application to the temple form provided a basis for vernacular interpretations of the Greek Revival style, which dominated residential construction until the advent of picturesque architecture.

== Relationship to surroundings ==
The mansion faces west from the southeast corner of High and Washington Streets. The large scale of execution and the imposing qualities of the architecture enable this building to dominate the surrounding area. High Street during the 19th and early 20th centuries was the most prestigious residential area in Middletown. It is now part of the campus of Wesleyan University.

== Current use and condition ==
After the Russell family retained the house for five generations, in 1937 Thomas Macdonough Russell, Jr. deeded it to Wesleyan University. The building was used as Honors College until 1996. The building is currently used as a special events facility and as the home of the University's Philosophy department.

== See also ==
- List of National Historic Landmarks in Connecticut
- National Register of Historic Places listings in Middlesex County, Connecticut

== Sources ==
- Middletown, Connecticut Historical and Architectural Resources. Volume III, Card Number 135. John Reynolds. July 1978.
