= Henry F. Miller House =

Historic house in Connecticut, United States

- U.S. National Register of Historic Places
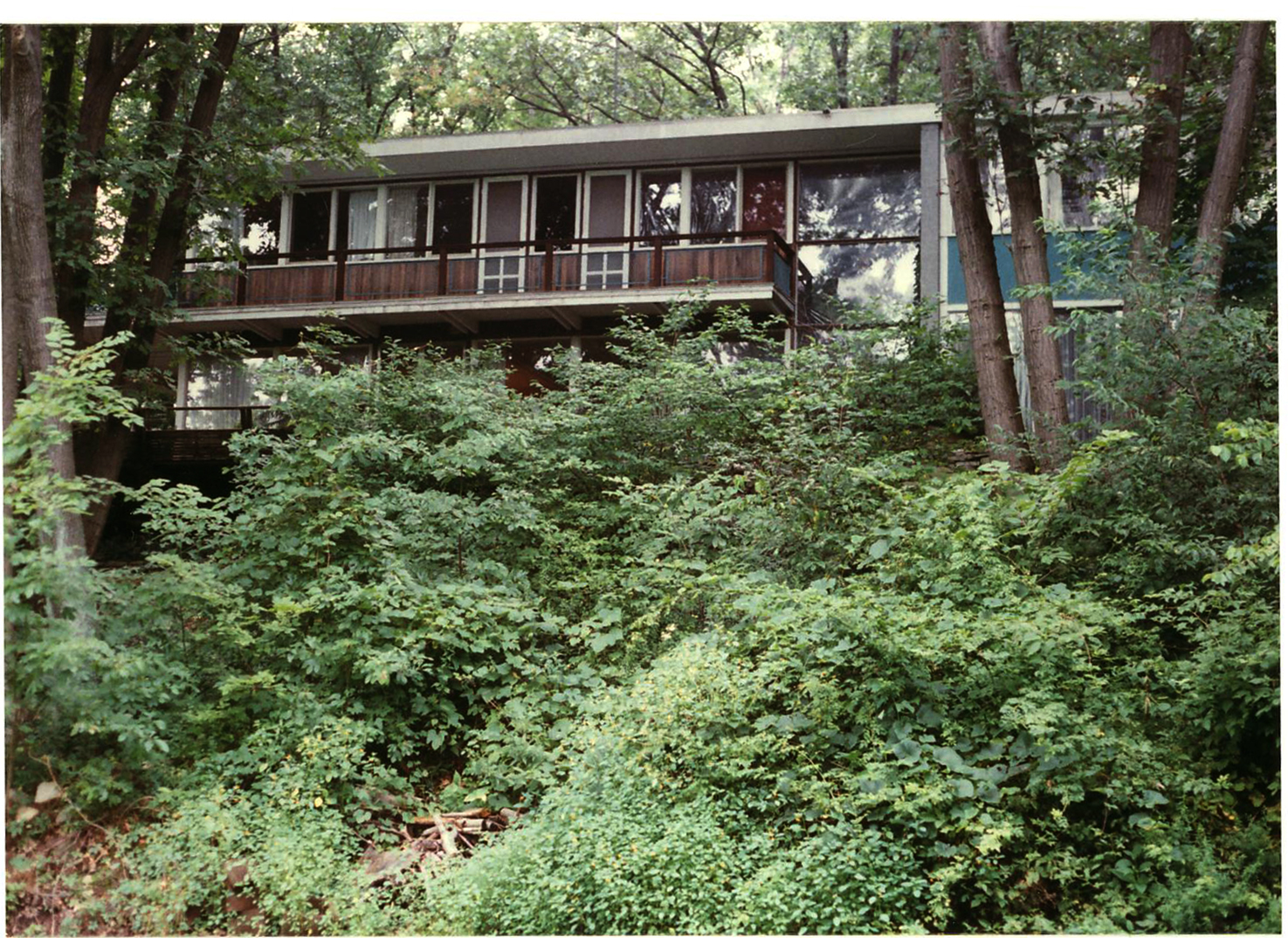

- Location within Connecticut Location within the United States
- Location: 30 Derby Avenue CT 34, Orange, Connecticut
- Coordinates: 41°18′1.5″N 72°59′14.68″W
- Built: 1949
- Architect: Henry F. Miller (Anthony Concelmo, builder)
- Architectural style: International Style
- NRHP reference No.: 01000399
- Added to NRHP: April 25, 2001

The Henry F. Miller house is an international style house at 30 Derby Avenue CT 34, in Orange, Connecticut on the United States National Register of Historic Places. The house was designed and built in 1948-1949 by Henry F. Miller as a thesis project for a Master of Architecture at the Yale School of Architecture. The house was one of the areas first modern houses and was featured in the New Haven Register as "The House of Tomorrow". It was open to visitors for a few weeks after completion to raise funds for the New Haven Boy's Club. It was viewed with "wild anticipation," and about 25,000 people paid a small admission to see it. The house was also covered in House Beautiful as part of a series on "The New American Style."

This house embodies many characteristics of the International Style, as adapted to the single-family suburban house, including an open plan with movable walls, flat roof, inclusion of modern conveniences, careful attention to environmental and functional considerations, avoidance of ornament, and extensive use of glass. The house was designed to take full advantage of its unique site on the side of a hill. Connecticut has an unusually large concentration of international style houses, including the most famous, Johnson's Glass House. Originally developed in Europe as a new system of building that took advantage of modern technological advances and embraced an unornamented, machine-made esthetic transcending regional or national characteristics, the International Style absorbed some natural materials and regional features in the years just before and after World War II.

The following information was a portion of the National Register of Historic Places application form compiled by Christopher Wigren, Architectural Historian, Connecticut Trust for Historic Preservation, Vice President.

== Background ==
Miller was an architecture student at Yale and chose to design a modern house for his thesis project. Upon completion, Miller and his wife lived in the house. As their family grew the Millers added a new master bedroom, study, and playroom in 1959, but the addition carefully followed the lines and style of the original.

In the New Haven area, George Kreye, a professor of German at Yale, had designed an international style house in 1935. Of the postwar houses, the Miller house was one of the first, but others soon joined it. Also in Orange was the Clark house, designed by Marcel Breuer and completed in 1951, utilizing the rough fieldstone and binuclear plan that were typical of Breuer's work at that time. In other New Haven suburbs, modern houses were built by young architects like Peter Hale, Carlton Granberry, King-lui Wu and Robert Coolidge or by established architects like Douglas Orr who adopted Modernism. Vincent Scully designed his own house in Woodbridge.

The Miller house helped the spread of Modern architecture in Connecticut and the United States. Yale was one of the leading architecture schools in promoting the Modern movement, and its faculty and students made the New Haven area a center of post-war Modernism in Connecticut and the United States.

In the House Beautiful article on the Miller house as part of that magazine's ongoing coverage of what it called "the New American Style", the article stressed economy and technology in addition to aesthetics. Its opening also suggests the difficulty of convincing average Americans to consider Modern architecture:

The American Dream: — as much luxury as possible — for as little money as possible. Like all

dreams, this one won't come true by just wishing. You have to do what this Connecticut family did — work at it. They parked their prejudices, studied all the advanced techniques in home building, and applied them. Result: 2,152 sq ft (199.9 m^{2}). of luxury for $25,000.

In 1985, the Miller house was included in an exhibition at the Yale School of Architecture called "Ten Years Out." The exhibition showed buildings designed by alumni of the school in their first ten years after graduation. The Miller house was the earliest work in the show.

== International style characteristics ==
The house embodies many distinctive characteristics of postwar International Style architecture:

- post and beam frame: creates flexible interior and frees structure from cladding. Makes possible large expanses of glass, since the walls do not support the structure.
- extensive use of glass: in large fixed sheets, operable windows, and glazed doors—to make the interior light and airy and to provide visual connection to outdoors.
- simple, geometric shapes: including a flat roof.
- untraditional plan: main living spaces on lower level to take advantage of hillside location and allow easy access to terraces. Bathroom divided into three compartments — for tub, toilet, and sink — to allow simultaneous use by more than one person. Planning for privacy: few, small windows toward street; orientation to rear of lot (different from conventional plans, which faced living room toward street).
- integration of structure and site: house is sited on small buildable portion of a lot, on brink of hill leading down to wetlands. Living spaces open to terrace and deck for outdoor living; on upper level, balcony provides further outdoor spaces. Large windows provide sense of connection between interior and exterior as does design of planting bed at foot of stairs. Fences and dividers screen carport from guests' entry and service yard from living spaces. Existing vegetation saved wherever possible and other landscaping executed in naturalistic style to blend with surroundings.

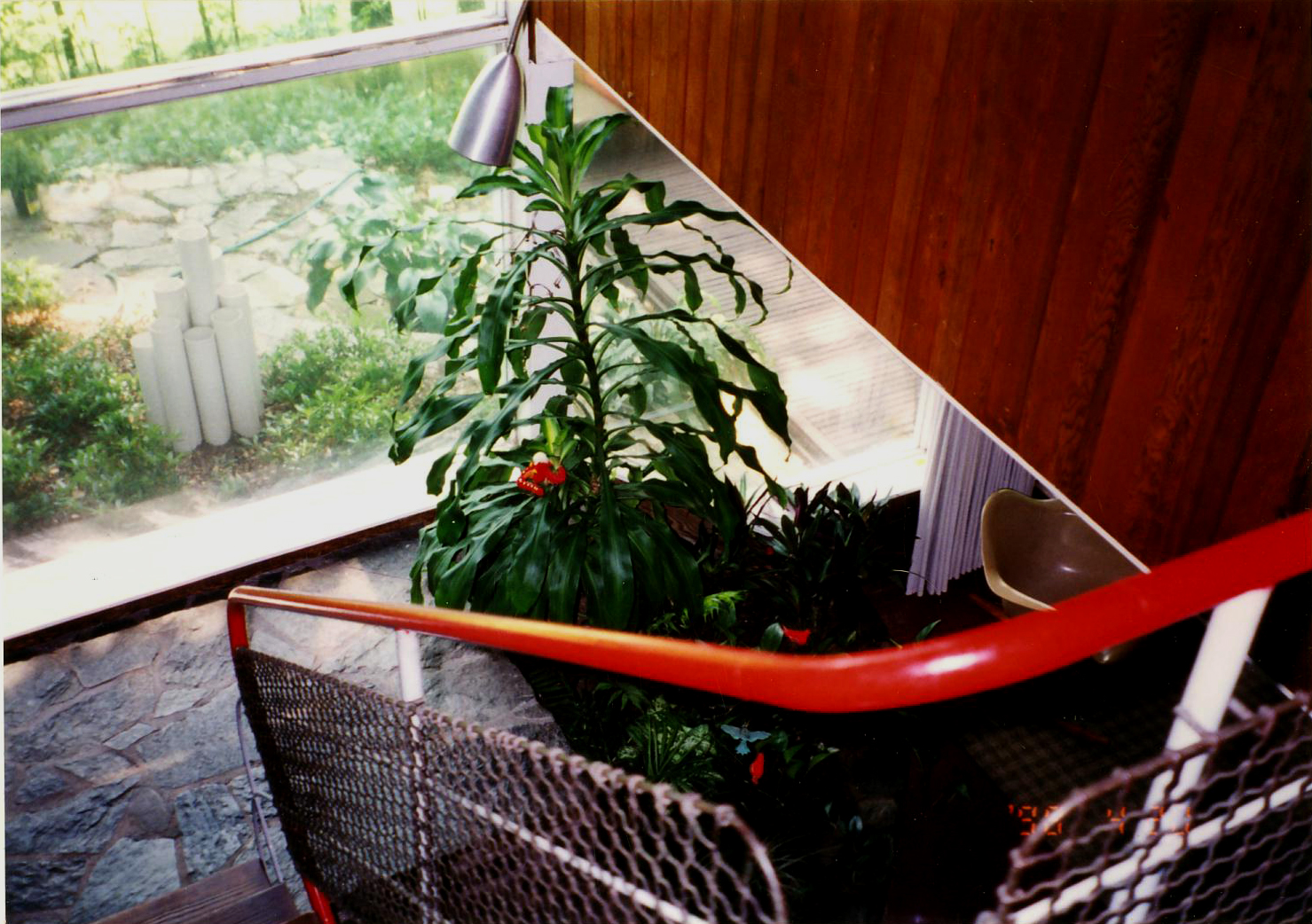
View of stair from above.

- planning to take advantage of climate: windows face south, with shading computed to allow sunlight into the house in winter, but not in summer. Solid or nearly solid walls facing north, to provide protection from winter winds. Placement of windows and doors to allow cross ventilation. The roof has a parapet that allows it to be flooded in the summer, providing additional cooling.
- extensive storage space: Examples include shallow shelves for cans in kitchen and movable storage walls containing drawers as well as hanging space, which double as room dividers.
- innovative technology: built-in watering system for indoor planting bed. Intercom between kitchen and front door, with electric latch that allows front door to be opened without coming upstairs. Radiant heating in the floor, eliminating radiators in the lower level.
- aesthetics: a sense of openness and space achieved by the use of large windows, open plan, simple forms and the open stairwell, with its large window, open treads, and light rail. Moldings and ornament are eliminated.

== Henry F. Miller ==
Henry F. Miller was born in 1916 in South Dartmouth, Massachusetts and grew up in New York City. He received a Bachelor of Arts degree from Yale University in 1938. At Yale, he was on the editorial staff of campus humor magazine The Yale Record. After serving in the Army in World War II, he returned to Yale, graduating with a Bachelor of Architecture in 1948. Miller taught at Yale for a year, and then joined the firm of Harold H. Davis in New Haven (later known as Davis Cochran Miller Baerman Noyes). The firm worked on a wide variety of projects, particularly educational, public and commercial facilities. In 1974 Miller left the firm to serve as Associate Director of Facilities Planning for Yale University. He retired in 1990.

Miller became a Fellow of the American Institute of Architects in 1972. Historic preservation became a special interest, and he served as Connecticut State Preservation Coordinator on the national AIA Historic Resources Committee. In addition, Miller was a member of the boards of the New Haven Colony Historical Society, the New Haven Preservation Trust and the Connecticut Trust for Historic Preservation, and served on the Connecticut State Historic Preservation Board.

== See also ==
- National Register of Historic Places listings in New Haven County, Connecticut
