= Orange Center Historic District (Orange, Connecticut) =

Historic district in Connecticut, United States

- U.S. National Register of Historic Places
- U.S. Historic district
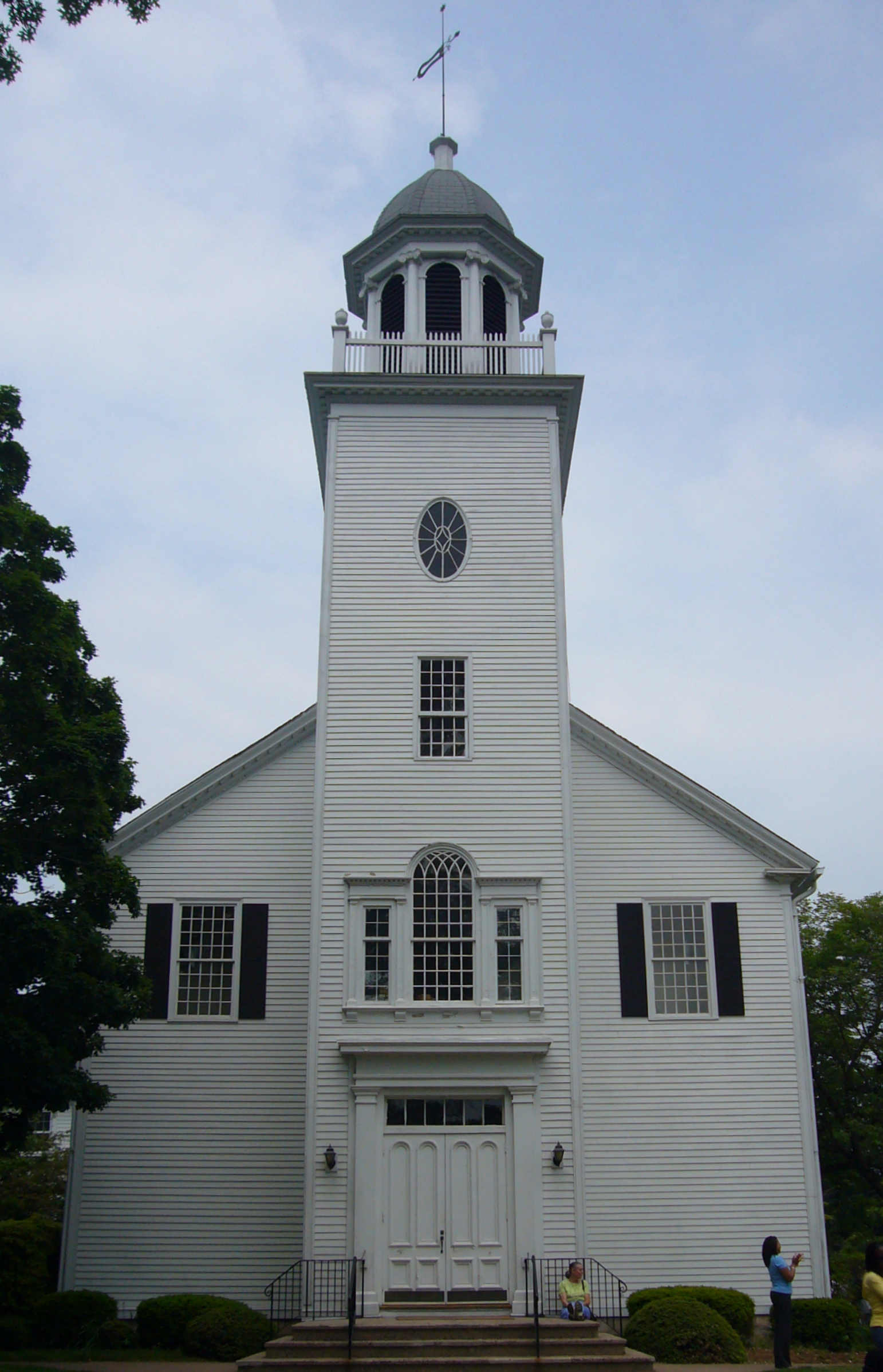
- Orange Congregational Church

- Location within Connecticut Location within the United States
- Location: Roughly Orange Center Road from Orange Cemetery to Nan Drive, Orange, Connecticut
- Coordinates: 41°16′36″N 73°1′40″W
- Area: 195 acres (79 ha)
- Built: 1810
- Architect: Hoadley, David
- Architectural style: Greek Revival, Late Victorian, Federal
- NRHP reference No.: 89001089
- Added to NRHP: August 10, 1989

The Orange Center Historic District encompasses the historic town center of Orange, Connecticut. Centered on the town green at the Junction of Meetinghouse Lane and Orange Center Road CT 152, it has retained its character as a 19th-century agrarian town center despite significant 20th-century suburbanization around it. Originally established as a local historic district in 1978, it listed on the National Register of Historic Places in 1989.

== Description and history ==
Orange was originally part of Milford, and was first settled in the late 17th century. It grew as a collection of dispersed farm properties through the 18th century, and in 1791 a common area, part of which survives as the town green, was set aside. A Congregational parish was authorized in 1804, prompting the construction of the present church. The town was separate incorporated in 1822. Growth of the town center was modest, because it was bypassed by major transportation routes.

The Orange Congregational Church, designed by David Hoadley and built in 1810 on the town green, is a centerpiece of the district. This Federal style church features a Palladian window, domed belfry and a painted black oval "window" on the front tower. The district also includes the Stone-Otis House (Federal with Greek Revival portico), built circa 1830 (now a museum) and The academy, a schoolhouse built in 1878 with stick style elements, including an elaborate gable screen, also now a museum. The district includes examples of Greek Revival, Late Victorian, and Federal architecture.

== See also ==
- National Register of Historic Places listings in New Haven County, Connecticut
