= William Andrew House =

Historic house in Connecticut, United States

- U.S. National Register of Historic Places
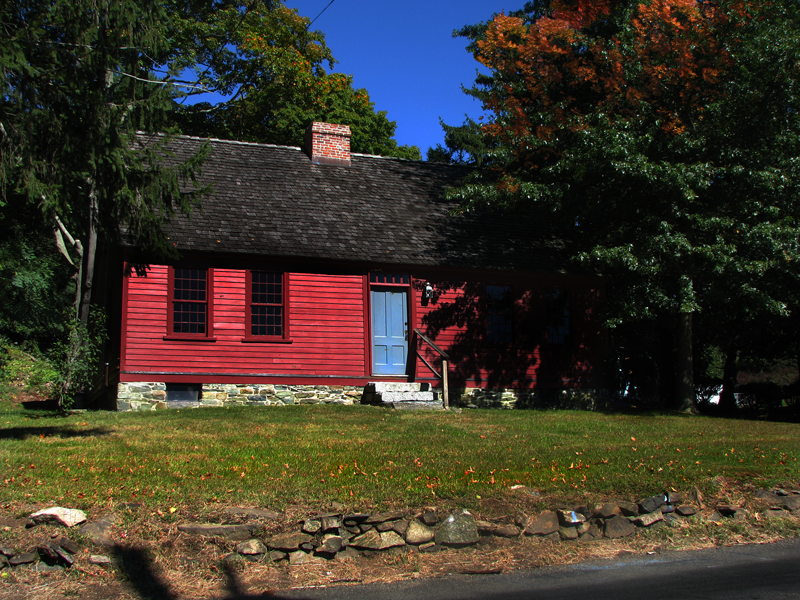

- Location within Connecticut Location within the United States
- Location: 131 Old Tavern Road, Orange, Connecticut
- Coordinates: 41°15′55″N 73°0′44″W
- Area: 1 acre (0.40 ha)
- Built: 1775
- Architectural style: Georgian
- NRHP reference No.: 02001695
- Added to NRHP: December 27, 2002

The William Andrew House, also known as the Richard Bryan House or the Bryan-Andrew House, is a historic house museum at 131 Old Tavern Road in Orange, Connecticut. Built either about 1750 or 1775, it is a well-preserved local example of Georgian colonial residential architecture, and is Orange's oldest surviving building. It was listed on the National Register of Historic Places in 2002. It is now a house museum operated by the local historical society.

== Description and history ==
The William Andrew House is located in southern Orange, on the north side of Old Tavern Road near its crossing of the Indian River. It is a 1 1/2-story wood-frame structure, with a gabled roof, central chimney, and clapboarded exterior. It includes a finely detailed front cornice, feather-edged sheathing, and hand-split lath laboriously installed without nails. The main facade is five bays wide, with a central entrance topped by a multilight transom window. The interior retains original period finishes, and exposes hand-hewn framing and finish elements. Leanto sections extend the house to the rear.

According to one source, the house was built about 1750 for the Bryan family, early settlers in North Milford. Another claims it was more likely built about 1775 for William Andrew, with earlier dates confusing this house for an older one that is no longer standing. The house later served as housing for dairy farm employees and was ultimately bought by the Town of Orange in 2000 to be restored for use as a museum.

== See also ==
- National Register of Historic Places listings in New Haven County, Connecticut
