= Orange, Connecticut =

- Town
- Town of Orange
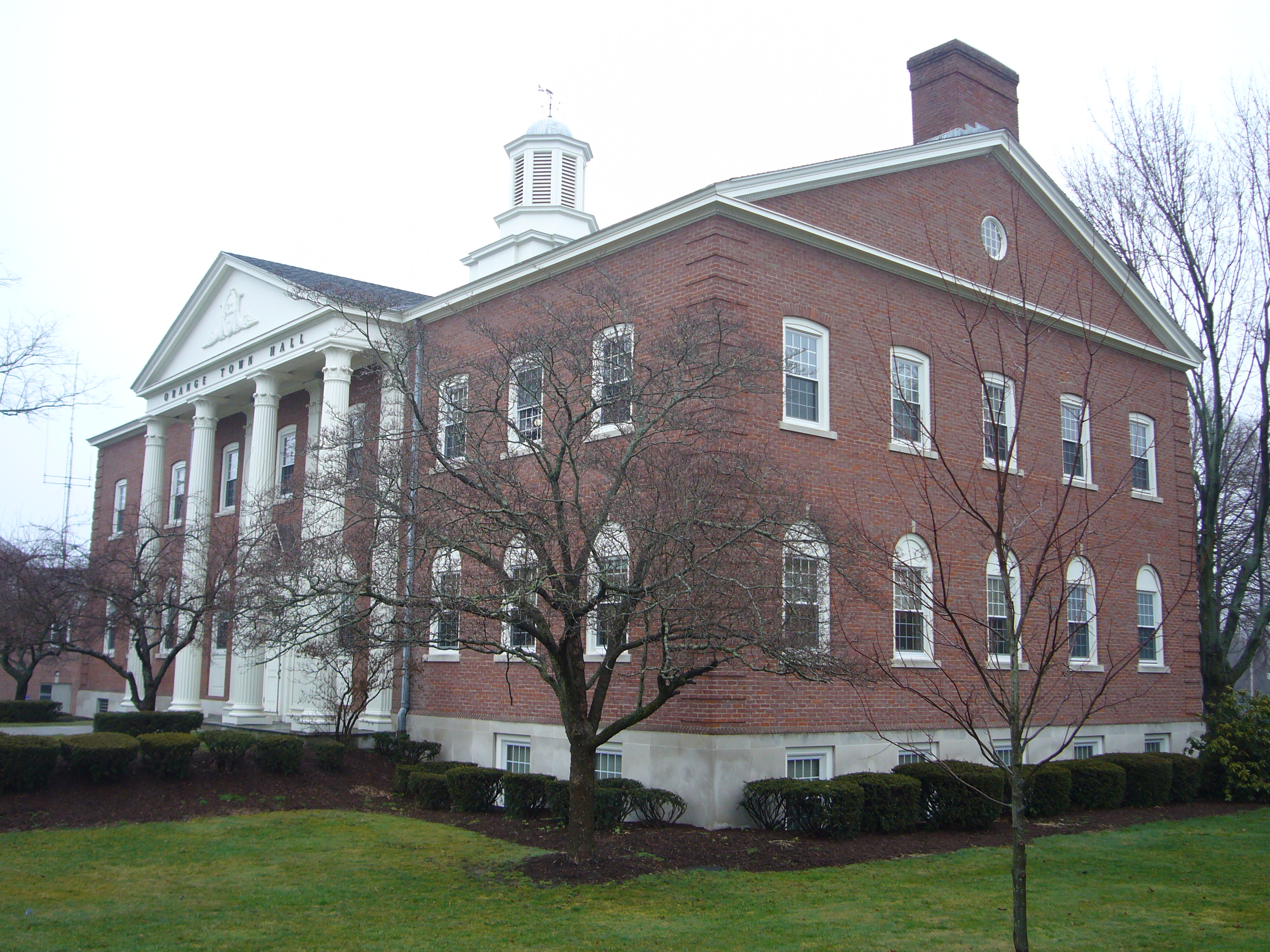
- Orange Town Hall

- Flag Seal

- Coordinates: 41°16′46″N 73°01′31″W
- Country: United States
- U.S. state: Connecticut
- County: New Haven
- Region: South Central CT
- Incorporated: 1822

Government
  - Type: Selectman-town meeting
  - First selectman: James M. Zeoli (R)
  - Selectmen: Ralph Okenquist (R); John Carangelo (R); Judy W. Williams (R); Connor Deane (D); Mitchell R. Goldblatt (D)

Area
  - Total: 17.4 sq mi (45.1 km^{2})
  - Land: 17.2 sq mi (44.5 km^{2})
  - Water: 0.23 sq mi (0.6 km^{2})
- Elevation: 213 ft (65 m)

Population (2020)
  - Total: 14,280
  - Density: 831/sq mi (321/km^{2})
- Time zone: UTC-5 (Eastern)
  - Summer (DST): UTC-4 (Eastern)
- ZIP code: 06477
- Area codes: 203/475
- FIPS code: 09-57600
- GNIS feature ID: 0213485
- Website: www.orange-ct.gov

Orange is a town in New Haven County, Connecticut, part of the South Central Connecticut Planning Region. The population was 14,280 at the 2020 census. The town is governed by a Board of Selectmen.

== History ==
The Paugussett and Algonquian people previously inhabited the region that is now Orange. In 1639, Rev. Peter Prudden purchased the land from the Native Americans for six coats, ten blankets, one kettle, twelve hatchets, twelve hoes, two dozen knives and a dozen small mirrors. When originally settled by English colonists, Orange was the northern and eastern district of the now neighboring city of Milford; however, by 1822, the population of the area had grown to the point where residents desired to form their own separate community, thus forming the town of Orange.

The town is named after William III of England, who was Prince of Orange from birth. William is remembered for succeeding James II, deposed in the Glorious Revolution of 1688. James II had been considered a despot in Connecticut; he had famously and unsuccessfully commissioned Edmund Andros to seize Connecticut's Charter.

The town continued to grow throughout the 19th century. As early as 1848, a separation of Orange and West Haven was considered. It was not until 1921 that the two were officially separated by act of the Connecticut General Assembly and the new city of West Haven was formed out of the southeastern portion of Orange. This left Orange a largely rural town, as the bulk of the urbanized population was ceded to West Haven. In the post-war years, however, Orange began suburbanizing at a rapid pace.

Early roads through the area included the Boston Post Road (now Route 1) and the Derby Turnpike (now Route 34). The turnpike was originally an Indian path. A toll road through Orange, from New Haven to Derby, was built starting in 1800. The toll house was located in Orange; tolls ended in 1887. The New Haven and Derby Railroad ran through Orange starting in 1871, with a station in Orange. At its peak, there were eleven trains per day in each direction along with one freight train. The advent of a trolley from New Haven to Derby (starting in 1904 and running until 1937) hastened the end to rail service (in 1925). Later, the construction of Route 15 (Wilbur Cross Parkway) and Interstate 95 brought highways through the area.

Orange station is a planned stop on Metro-North Railroad's New Haven Line. Construction has been on hold since late 2017.

== Geography ==
According to the United States Census Bureau, the town has a total area of 17.4 square miles (45.1 km^{2}), of which 17.2 square miles (44.5 km^{2}) is land and 0.2 square miles (0.6 km^{2}), or 1.38%, is water. It is bordered on the south by Milford, on the east by West Haven, on the north by New Haven, Woodbridge and Derby and on the west by the Housatonic River and Shelton. The town limits include Wooster Island in the Housatonic River. The Wepawaug, Indian and Oyster rivers flow through the town.

== Demographics ==
Historical population
Year	Pop.	±%
1830	1,341	—
1840	1,329	−0.9%
1850	1,476	+11.1%
1860	1,974	+33.7%
1870	2,634	+33.4%
1880	3,341	+26.8%
1890	4,537	+35.8%
1900	6,995	+54.2%
1910	11,272	+61.1%
1920	16,614	+47.4%
1930	1,530	−90.8%
1940	2,009	+31.3%
1950	3,032	+50.9%
1960	8,547	+181.9%
1970	13,524	+58.2%
1980	13,237	−2.1%
1990	12,830	−3.1%
2000	13,233	+3.1%
2010	13,956	+5.5%
2020	14,280	+2.3%

As of the census of 2000, there were 13,233 people, 4,739 households, and 3,895 families residing in the town. The population density was 770.0 inhabitants per square mile (297.3/km^{2}). There were 4,870 housing units at an average density of 283.4 per square mile (109.4/km^{2}). The racial makeup of the town was 94.08% White, 0.79% Black or African American, 0.08% Native American, 3.84% Asian, 0.01% Pacific Islander, 0.32% from other races, and 0.88% from two or more races. Hispanic or Latino of any race were 1.44% of the population.

There were 4,739 households, out of which 35.1% had children under the age of 18 living with them, 73.1% were married couples living together, 6.7% had a female householder with no husband present, and 17.8% were non-families. 15.7% of all households were made up of individuals, and 10.0% had someone living alone who was 65 years of age or older. The average household size was 2.77 and the average family size was 3.09.

In the town, the population was spread out, with 24.6% under the age of 18, 4.3% from 18 to 24, 24.5% from 25 to 44, 26.7% from 45 to 64, and 19.9% who were 65 years of age or older. The median age was 43 years. For every 100 females, there were 94.5 males. For every 100 females age 18 and over, there were 91.1 males.

The median income for a household in the town was $79,365, and the median income for a family was $88,583. Males had a median income of $58,946 versus $41,563 for females. The per capita income for the town was $36,471. About 2.1% of families and 2.5% of the population were below the poverty line, including 1.4% of those under age 18 and 4.3% of those age 65 or over.

Registration and Party Enrollment Statistics as of October 17, 2025
Party	Active voters	Inactive voters	Total voters	Percentage
Republican	2,813	73	2,886	25.3%
Democratic	2,926	100	3,026	26.5%
Unaffiliated	5,207	132	5,339	46.8%
Minor parties	150	6	156	1.4%
Total	11,096	311	11,407	100%

== Economy ==
Orange is the home of the North American headquarters of Pez candies. It is also the home of the headquarters of Avangrid and its subsidiaries Southern Connecticut Gas and The United Illuminating Company.

Tangoe, Inc., a provider of telecommunications management software, was formerly headquartered in Orange. Orange was the home of the US headquarters of Saab-Scania from 1972 until 1992 when the company relocated to Norcross, Georgia. From 1973–2010, Hubbell, a manufacturer of electrical products, was headquartered in Orange. In 2013, the University of New Haven purchased the former Hubbell headquarters buildings to redevelop as a graduate school campus. Yale's West Campus is located on the Orange-West Haven town line, on a 136-acre property that was formerly occupied by Bayer. In 2013, the Yale School of Nursing relocated to a building on the Yale West Campus that is mostly on the Orange side of the town border.

About three percent of the 17 square miles in the town is farmed. Field View Farm, one of the oldest businesses in the United States, has been operated by the Hine family since 1639. Orange was also formerly home to the Everett B. Clark Seed Company which eventually joined forces with other local seed growers to form Asgrow, now a division of Bayer.

The town has extensive retail development along the Boston Post Road corridor.

During the Cold War, Orange was a location for the permanent deployment of Nike missiles for the defense of Greater New Haven. The former site of the Nike missiles has since (from the late 1950s onward) been the home of the 103rd Air Control and Warning Squadron, later to become the 103rd Tactical Control Squadron and as it remains today the 103rd Air Control Squadron, a part of the Connecticut Air National Guard.

== Arts and culture ==
=== Events ===
Orange exhibits its rural roots at the annual Orange Country Fair. This event originally ran from 1898 to 1912 and was revived in 1975. It has continued since then featuring horse, oxen and tractor pulls as well as exhibits of animals, flowers, fruits, vegetables and baked goods. In early August, the town also promotes the Orange Volunteer Fireman's Carnival, which raises funds to support the volunteer fire department. Both events are held at the fairgrounds at High Plains Community Center near the center of town.

Orange was the site of one of the earliest computer camps, held at the local Amity Jr. High School in 1977.

In the early nineteenth century, settlers from Orange founded Orange, Ohio, then part of Connecticut's Western Reserve.

On March 15–17, 2009, Orange hosted the 2009 ConnJam, a Boy Scout event in which over 3,000 Boy Scouts from the Connecticut Yankee Council attended events and camped over the weekend.

=== On the National Register of Historic Places ===
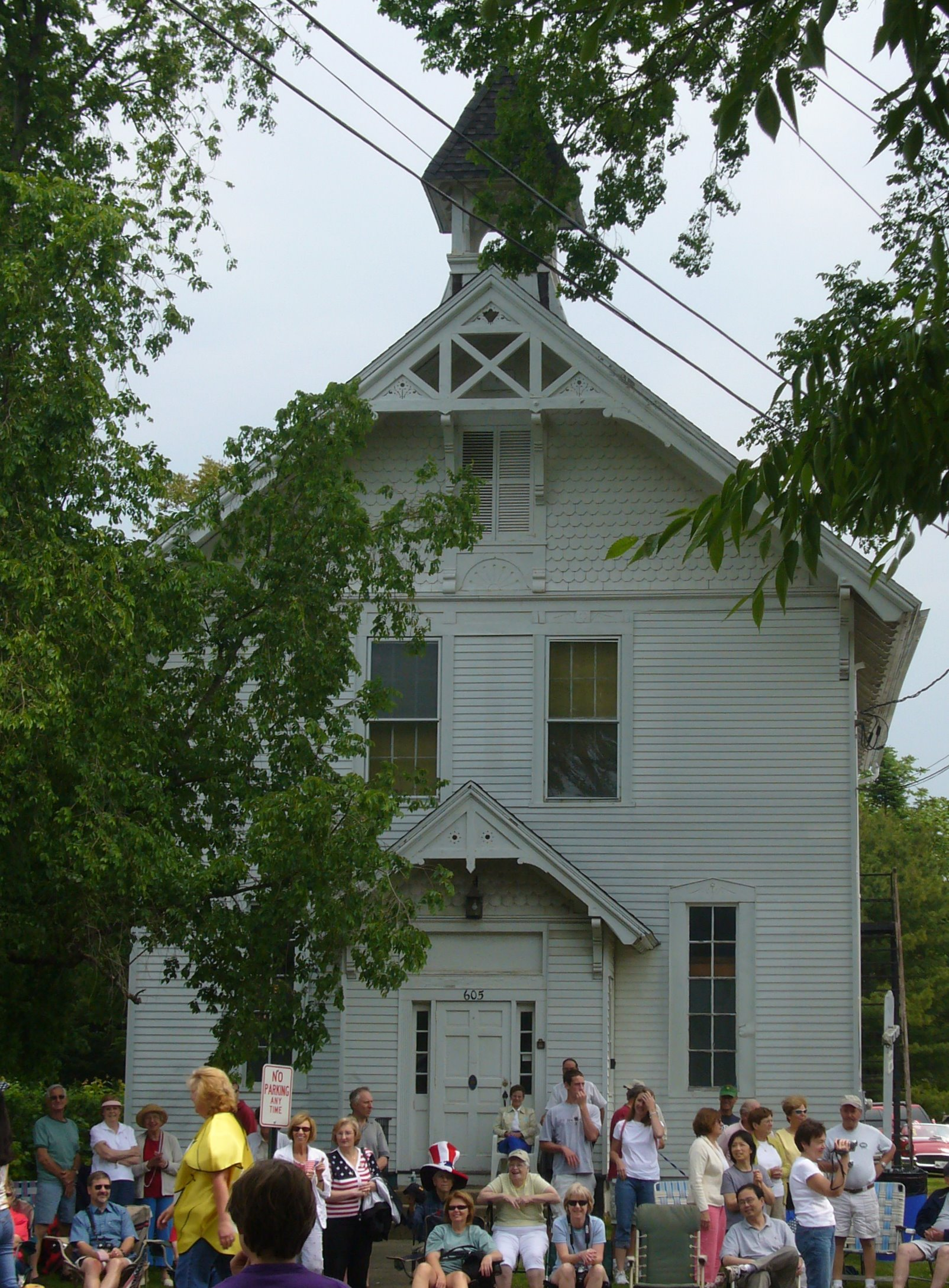
The Academy

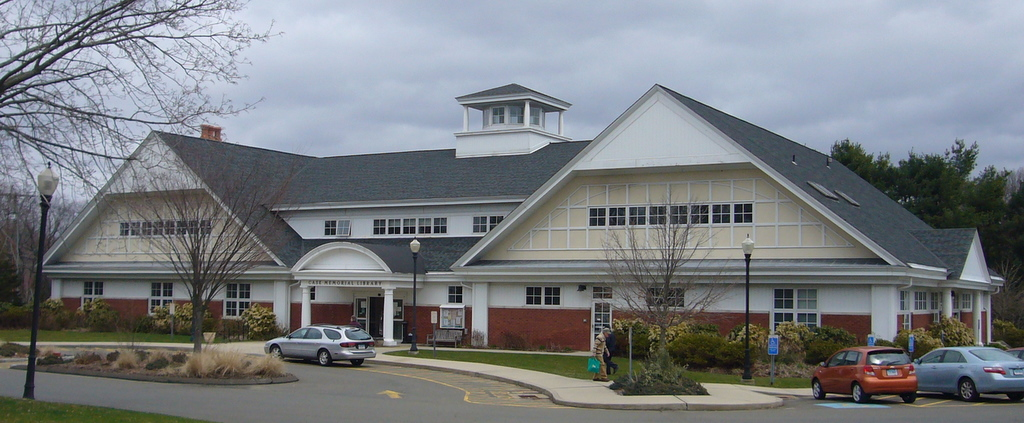
Case Memorial Library

- Col. Asa Platt House – 2 Tyler City Road (added 2002). Federal style. Built in 1810, it is thought to have been built by David Hoadley, who built the Orange Congregational Church. The nomination to the register, by Jan Cunningham, refers to "the elegant refinement of the interior", repeated elliptical forms in "the sunbursts of the mantelpieces; in the recessed panels below the parlor windows; in the capitals of the arches; and, in a wholly unexpected manner, in the high relief of the egg form that embellishes the simple mantel frieze in a second-floor chamber."
- Henry F. Miller House – 30 Derby Avenue Connecticut Route 34 (added May 25, 2001). This international style house was completed in 1949 and featured at the time in the New Haven Register as "The House of Tomorrow".
- Orange Center Historic District – Roughly Orange Center Road Connecticut Route 152 from Orange Cemetery to Nan Drive (added August 10, 1989). The district was originally established by the town January 13, 1978. The Orange Congregational Church, designed by David Hoadley and built in 1810 on the town green, is a centerpiece of the district. This Federal style church features a Palladian window, domed belfry and a painted black oval "window" on the front tower. The district also includes the Stone-Otis House (Federal with Greek Revival portico), built circa 1830 (now a museum) and The Academy, a schoolhouse built in 1878 with Stick style elements, including an elaborate gable screen, also now a museum.
- William Andrew House (also known as Bryan-Andrew House) – 131 Old Tavern Road (added 2002). Built about 1750 for the Bryan family, early settlers in North Milford. This area was known as "Bryan's Farms". The house includes a finely detailed front cornice, feather-edged sheathing and hand-split lath laboriously installed without nails. The house later served as housing for dairy farm employees and was ultimately bought by the Town of Orange in 2000 to be restored for use as a museum.

=== Library ===
- Case Memorial Library

== Sports ==
On August 18, 2005, the Orange Little League Girls softball team lost the championship game of the Little League Softball World Series to a team from McLean, Virginia.

== Education ==
Orange is served by the regional Amity Regional High School in Woodbridge. Schools include:

- Mary L. Tracy, for kindergarten and pre-school
- Peck Place, first to sixth grades
- Turkey Hill, first to sixth grades
- Racebrook, first to sixth grades
- Amity Middle School, seven to eighth grades (Orange campus)

Southern Connecticut Hebrew Academy (formerly New Haven Hebrew Day School) is located here.

== Notable people ==
- Anni Albers (1899–1994), artist
- Josef Albers (1888–1976), artist
- William Atherton (born 1947), character actor, born and raised in Orange
- Art Ceccarelli (1930–2012), baseball player
- Christopher Collier (1930–2020), historian, professor and winner of the Newbery Medal
- John J. DeGioia (born 1957), president of Georgetown University, raised in Orange
- Kristen Griest (born 1989), Army Captain and one of the first two female graduates of the United States Army Ranger School
- Henry Lee (born 1938), former resident, forensic scientist notable for his investigations of famous crimes
- Lev Nussberg (born 1937), is a Russian avant garde painter. Nussberg is the founder of Russian Kinetic Art
- Patrick B. O'Sullivan (1887–1978), U.S. Congressman and judge
- Tage Thompson (born 1997), NHL player for the Buffalo Sabres.
- Stephen Valiquette (born 1977), ice hockey goaltender
