= Charles Pomeroy Otis =

American educator and author (1840–1888)

- Born: April 8, 1840; Lebanon, Connecticut, U.S.
- Died: November 17, 1888 (aged 48); Boston, Massachusetts, U.S.
- Resting place: Exeter, New Hampshire, U.S.
- Education: Yale College (PhD)
- Occupations: Educator; writer
- Spouse: Sarah Margaret Noyes (m. 1884)
- Children: 2

Charles Pomeroy Otis (April 8, 1840 – November 17, 1888) was an American educator and author.

== Early life ==
Charles Pomeroy Otis was born on April 8, 1840, in Lebanon, Connecticut, to Olive M. (née Osgood) and reverend Israel T. Otis. His father was a pastor at Levanon. In 1844, he moved with his father to Rye, New Hampshire. He attended Phillips Exeter Academy. He graduated from Yale College in 1861.

Following graduation, Otis was principal at an academy in Fairfield, Connecticut, for about a year. He then became a teacher at the Russell Military Academy in New Haven. In January 1865, he became a Latin tutor at Yale College. In July 1869, he resigned and spent three years in Europe, mainly Paris and Berlin. He then studied again at Yale and graduated with a PhD in 1873.

== Career ==
In the summer of 1873, Otis was appointed professor of modern languages at the Massachusetts Institute of Technology. He remained there until his death.

== Works ==
- Otis, Charles Pomeroy, Grammar of Elementary German
- Otis, Charles Pomeroy, Outline of Middle High German Grammar and Selections from the Nibelungen Lied
- Otis, Charles Pomeroy (trans.) Voyages of Samuel de Champlain
- Schiller, Friedrich; Otis. Charles Pomeroy (ed.) Das Lied von der Glocke
- von Goethe, Johann Wolfang; Otis, Charles Pomeroy (ed.) Märchen

== Personal life ==
Otis married Sarah Margaret Noyes of Boston on June 11, 1884. They had two sons.

Otis fell into poor health in 1888. He died on November 17, 1888, at his home on Chestnut Street in Boston. He was buried in Exeter, New Hampshire.
