= Brown Tavern =

Historic tavern in Connecticut, United States

- U.S. National Register of Historic Places
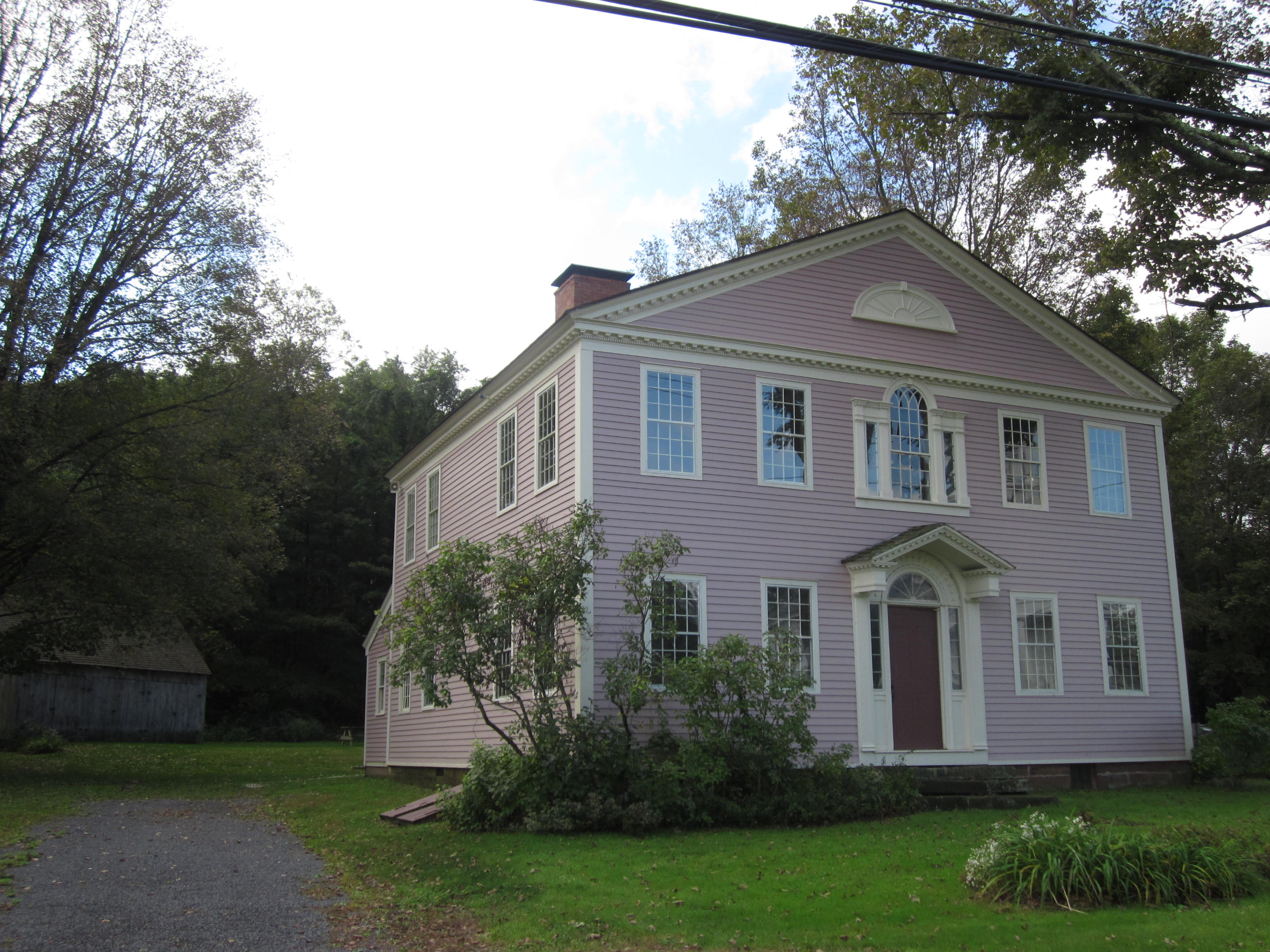

- Location within Connecticut Location within the United States
- Location: George Washington Turnpike, Burlington, Connecticut
- Coordinates: 41°46′7″N 72°57′57″W
- Area: 1 acre (0.40 ha)
- Architect: Hoadley, David
- Architectural style: Federal
- NRHP reference No.: 72001339
- Added to NRHP: May 5, 1972

The Brown Tavern is a historic house and public accommodation at George Washington Turnpike and Connecticut Route 4 in Burlington, Connecticut, USA. Probably built in the early 19th century, it is a fine example of Federal period architecture, its design tentatively credited to the New Haven architect David Hoadley. Now managed by the local historical society, it was listed on the National Register of Historic Places in 1972.

== Description and history ==
The Brown Tavern stands facing Burlington's triangular town green, on the south side of George Washington Turnpike at the green's western end. It is a 2½ story wood-frame structure, with a front-facing gable roof and clapboarded exterior. The main facade is five bays wide, with an elaborate Federal style entrance surround at the center. The entry is flanked by sidelight windows and pilasters, and is topped by a half-round transom window and shallow gabled hood. Above the entrance is a Palladian window with a rounded center that breaks the moulding at the roof eave. The front gable is fully pedimented, with dentil moulding around the edges and a Federal style semi-oval fan at the center.

The building is believed to have been built about 1809-10 for Giles Griswold, a merchant; its design has been speculatively attributed to New Haven architect David Hoadley. It has passed through a succession of owners, some of whom operated a tavern on the premises in the 19th century. The building was acquired by the town in 1974.

== See also ==
- National Register of Historic Places listings in Hartford County, Connecticut
