= Samuel Russell =

American entrepreneur and trader

- Born: August 25, 1789; Middletown, Connecticut, U.S.
- Died: May 5, 1862 (aged 72); Middletown, Connecticut, U.S.
- Known for: Founder of Russell & Company
- Spouses: Mary Cotton Osborne (m. 1815; died 1819); Frances Ann Osborne (m. 1825)
- Children: George Osborne Russell; John Augustus Russell; Samuel Wadsworth Russell
- Relatives: William Huntington Russell (cousin)

Samuel Russell (August 25, 1789 – May 5, 1862), was an American entrepreneur and trader, and founder of Russell & Company, the largest and most important American trading house in China from 1824 to its closing in 1891.

== Early life ==
Russell was born on August 25, 1789, in Middletown, Connecticut. He was a son of Capt. John Russell and Abigail (née Warner) Russell. He was a cousin of William Huntington Russell, a co-founder of the Skull and Bones Secret Society at Yale University.

At the age of 12, Russell was orphaned and did not receive any significant inheritance, and did not attend college. Instead, he began his career as apprentice clerk for a maritime trade merchant, Whittlesley & Alsop, in Middletown. It is there that Russell began learning his skills as a trader.

== Career ==
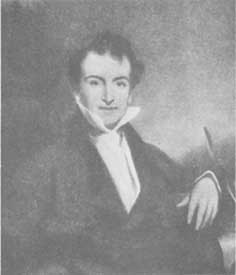
Russell's son Samuel Wadsworth

In 1810, after his apprenticeship with Whittlesley & Alsop ended, he moved to New York where he hoped to prosper. In 1812, he joined Hull & Griswold, a merchant house, based in New York but established by investors with family ties in Connecticut. He began traveling on company ships as supercargo and soon began trading on a commission basis which enabled him to found his first company, Russell & Company, a commission trader for Hull & Griswold, in his hometown of Middletown.

=== China ===
Attracted by financial prospects, Russell set out for China, an assured profitable venture. He arrived in Canton, China, in 1819, engaging in trade on behalf of the Providence firm of Edward Carrington & Company in various goods and products including opium, an extremely profitable activity despite being outlawed as it was protected by foreign forces.

The profits made by Russell enabled him to found Russell & Company in Canton, China, in 1824. Dealing mostly in silks, teas and opium, Russell & Company prospered, and by 1842, it had become the largest American trading house in China. It kept its dominance until its closing in 1891. Russell withdrew from the company in 1836. He returned to America, and lived in his mansion in his hometown of Middletown, Connecticut, until his death in 1862. The mansion, now bearing the name of Samuel Wadsworth Russell House, (his son's name, Samuel had no middle name) had an elaborately decorated interior; Russell had brought back many souvenirs and antiques from China, as well as gifts from his Chinese trade partner, Howqua.

== Personal life ==
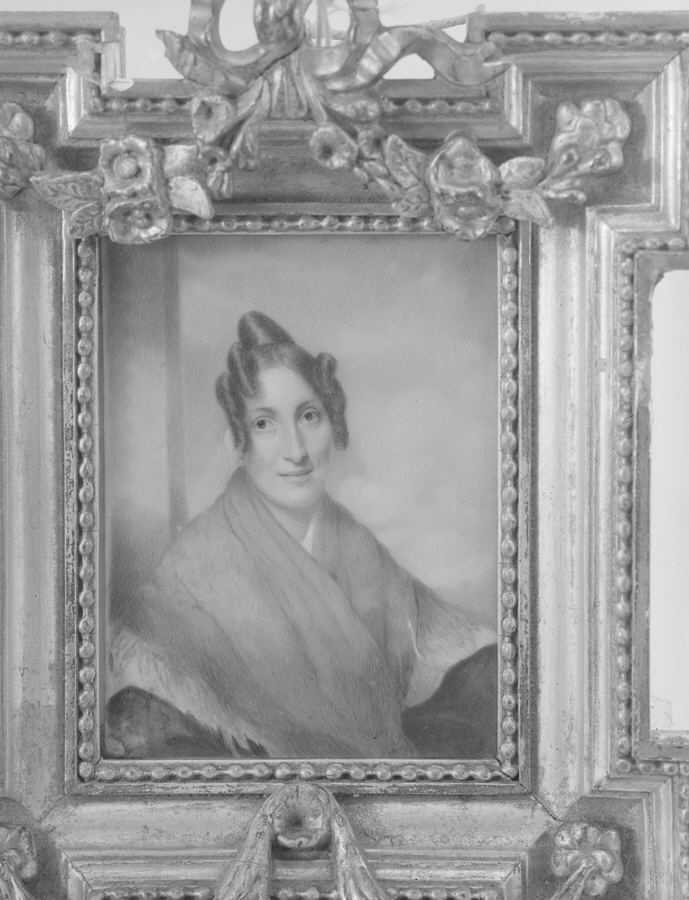
Miniature of his second wife, Frances Ann Osborne, by Henry Colton Shumway.

On October 6, 1815, Russell was first married to Mary Cotton Osborne, with whom he had two sons, George Osborne Russell and John Augustus Russell, neither of whom lived beyond the "age of early manhood." Mary was the daughter of David and Mary (née Cotton) Osborne. Mary died on September 4, 1819, aged 23, while he was in China and the children were cared for by her sister Frances Ann Osborne (1789–1862).

When Samuel returned from China, he and Frances were married on October 26, 1825, and had one child, Samuel Wadsworth Russell.

Russell died on May 5, 1862, in Middletown, Connecticut. His widow founded the Russell Library, a Gothic Revival building near the Church of the Holy Trinity and Rectory in Middletown.
