= Oyster River (Connecticut) =

River in Connecticut, USA

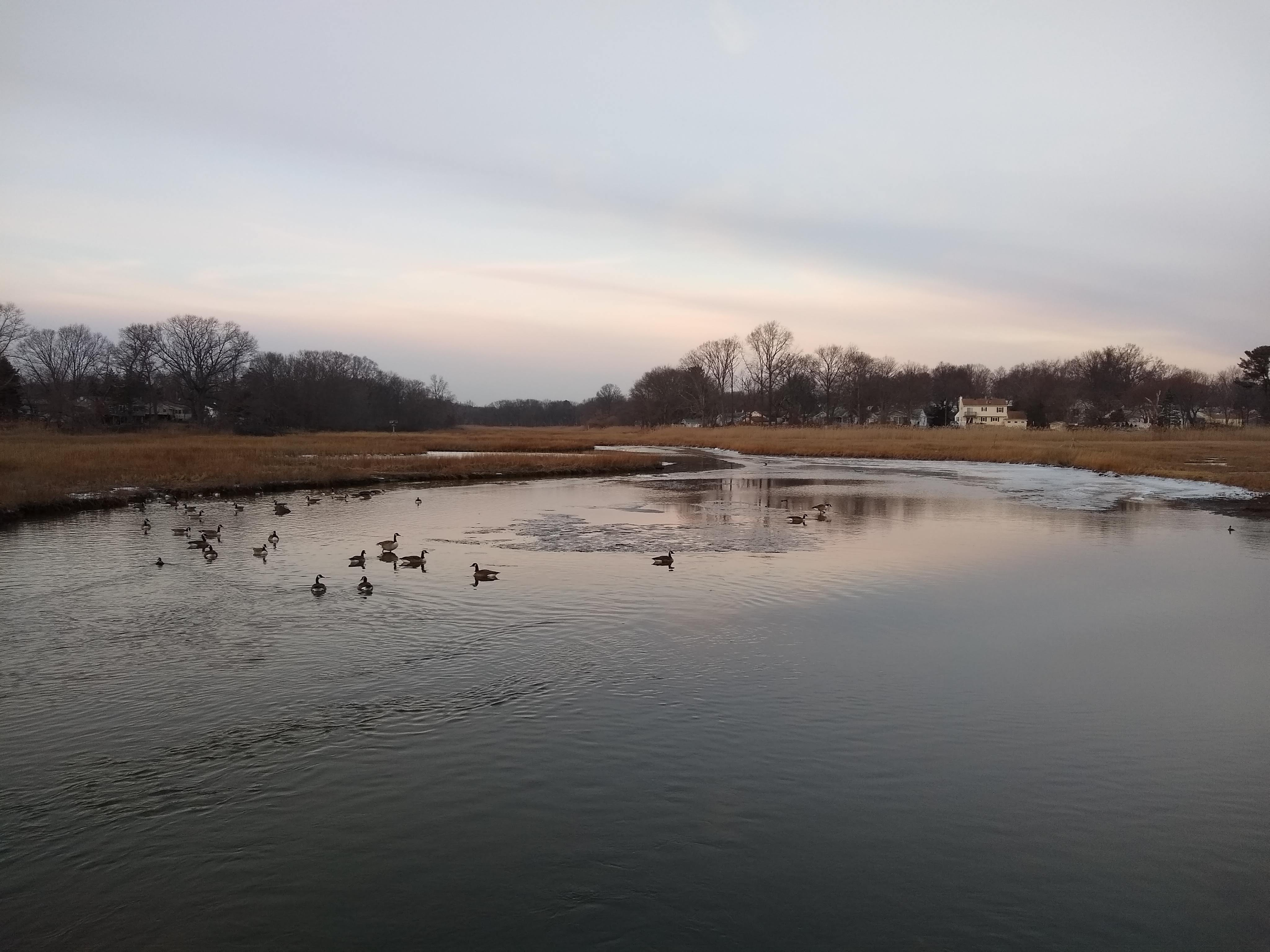
- Oyster River in Milford, Connecticut.

Location
- Country: United States
- State: Connecticut
- County: New Haven

Physical characteristics
- Source: Orange, Connecticut
- Mouth: Long Island Sound
  - location: Milford, Connecticut
  - coordinates: 41°14′05″N 72°59′28″W
- Length: 4.1 mi (6.6 km)

The Oyster River is a 4.1-mile-long (6.6 km) stream located in the state of Connecticut in New Haven County. It flows south through Orange and forms the boundary of West Haven and Orange and flows through Yale University's West Campus. Further downstream, it forms the boundary of West Haven and Milford. It empties into Long Island Sound, just south of Route 162 at Oyster River Point. Swans, box turtles and many other animals call this area home.

In colonial times, Oyster River Point was also known as Clarke's Point. Around 1840, Peter Aimes bought the land from the Clark family, and the area became known as Aimes Point. The Aimes’ family home, Martinstow, an impressive Gothic structure designed by James Renwick, overlooked the Oyster River and the Sound. After the family sold the property in 1949, the name “Aimes Point” slowly went out of common usage and the area became more commonly known as “Oyster River Point”.

The river has dealt with issues of flooding and pollution in recent years. In 2007, a movement was put together by local residents to gain aid from the local government to help with these issues.

== See also ==
- List of rivers of Connecticut

== Bibliography ==
- Selma Rattner, James Renwick biography. Macmillan Encyclopedia of Architects, Volume 3.
- Images of America, West Haven. West Haven Historical Society. Arcadia Publishing. 2005. ISBN 0-7385-3893-0.
