= Round Hill School =

Experimental boys' school in Northampton, Massachusetts (1823–1834)

Coordinates: 42.325°N 72.639°W

The Round Hill School for Boys was a short-lived experimental school in Northampton, Massachusetts. It was founded by George Bancroft and Joseph Cogswell in 1823. Though it failed as a viable venture — it closed in 1834 — it was an early effort to elevate secondary education in the United States for the sons of the New England elite. The incompatibility of the two founders was a fundamental cause of the eventual dissolution of the project.

== School founding ==
On his return from the University of Göttingen, wishing to shed upon others some of the inspiration he had received, George Bancroft applied for leave to read lectures on history at Harvard University. His request was denied. After this disappointment, in an attempt to introduce some parts of the German system of education to the United States, and in conjunction with Joseph Cogswell, Bancroft founded the Round Hill School. He left the school after a few years, leaving Cogswell in sole possession. The school was under the auspices of the Episcopal Church.

== Early years ==
During the first eight years of its history, it enrolled 293 pupils, drawn from 19 states and four foreign countries. The conductors of Round Hill put into practice ideas they had gathered in Germany, England, and Switzerland. In Switzerland, Cogswell had studied the schools of the two educators, Johann Heinrich Pestalozzi at Yverdon, and Philipp Emanuel von Fellenberg at the estate of Hofwyl near Bern. He was impressed by the good order and success of the institution of Fellenberg even more than by that of Pestalozzi. The companionship of teacher and pupil, study mingled with play, uniform development, attention to the study of modern languages — these principles impressed him forcibly, and he introduced them later at his own Round Hill School. The German system also included the abolition, as far as possible, of fear and emulation. The lash was forbidden, out-of-door life was emphasized as a feature, while individual attention given to each pupil was employed as a stimulus instead of rivalry. All these ideas were subsequently put into practice at Round Hill. It was the first school in the country thoroughly impressed with the German ideas.

== Scholars and closing ==
The Round Hill School secured German scholar Charles Beck in February 1824 shortly after he arrived with Charles Follen on the same ship the previous Christmas. Beck was appointed teacher of Latin, and he soon established at Round Hill the first gym and the first school gymnastics program in the United States. The gym was an outdoor facility. Follen was a visitor at Round Hill, and in November 1824 proceeded to Harvard to teach German.

Benjamin Peirce, Timothy Walker and Stiles French served in succession as the school's teacher of mathematics.

The school was comparable to a German gymnasium. It closed in 1834 due to financial difficulties and overwork on the part of Cogswell. Round Hill had an influence on William Augustus Muhlenberg (1796-1877), who founded two model schools on Long Island in 1828 and 1836 and whose proteges established eleven schools in seven states—including Saint James School in Maryland (1842), St. Paul's School, Concord, New Hampshire (1856), and the Shattuck School and St Mary's (Girls) School in Faribault, Minnesota (1858, 1866). The Muhlenberg-type school was more successful than Round Hill but the influence of Cogswell, Bancroft, et al. was evident in the objective of educating the whole person to excellence.

== Alumni ==
- Edward Clifford Anderson, American Civil War general (Confederate)
- Thomas Gold Appleton, Boston wit and litterateur
- Henry W. Bellows, Unitarian clergyman, reformer
- Francis Boott, composer
- Ellery Channing, poet
- George Edward Ellis, Unitarian clergyman
- John Murray Forbes, merchant, philanthropist, founder of the modern Milton Academy
- George Gibbs, ethnologist, geologist and naturalist
- Philip Kearny, American Civil War general (Union)
- Robert Traill Spence Lowell, clergyman, headmaster of St. Mark's School (1869-1874)
- Rev. Samuel May Jr. (b. 1810), Unitariam clergyman, abolitionist, cousin of Samuel Joseph May
- John Lothrop Motley, historian and diplomat
- George W. Riggs, financier
- Theodore Sedgwick, law writer
- George Cheyne Shattuck Jr., founder of St. Paul's School
- Nathaniel B. Shurtleff, mayor of Boston
- Samuel Cutler Ward, American lobbyist
- Josiah Whitney, geologist
- Charles Storer Storrow, prominent American civil engineer and industrialist
