= Russell Library (Middletown, Connecticut) =

Library in Middletown, Connecticut, USA

Coordinates: 41°33′36″N 72°39′09″W

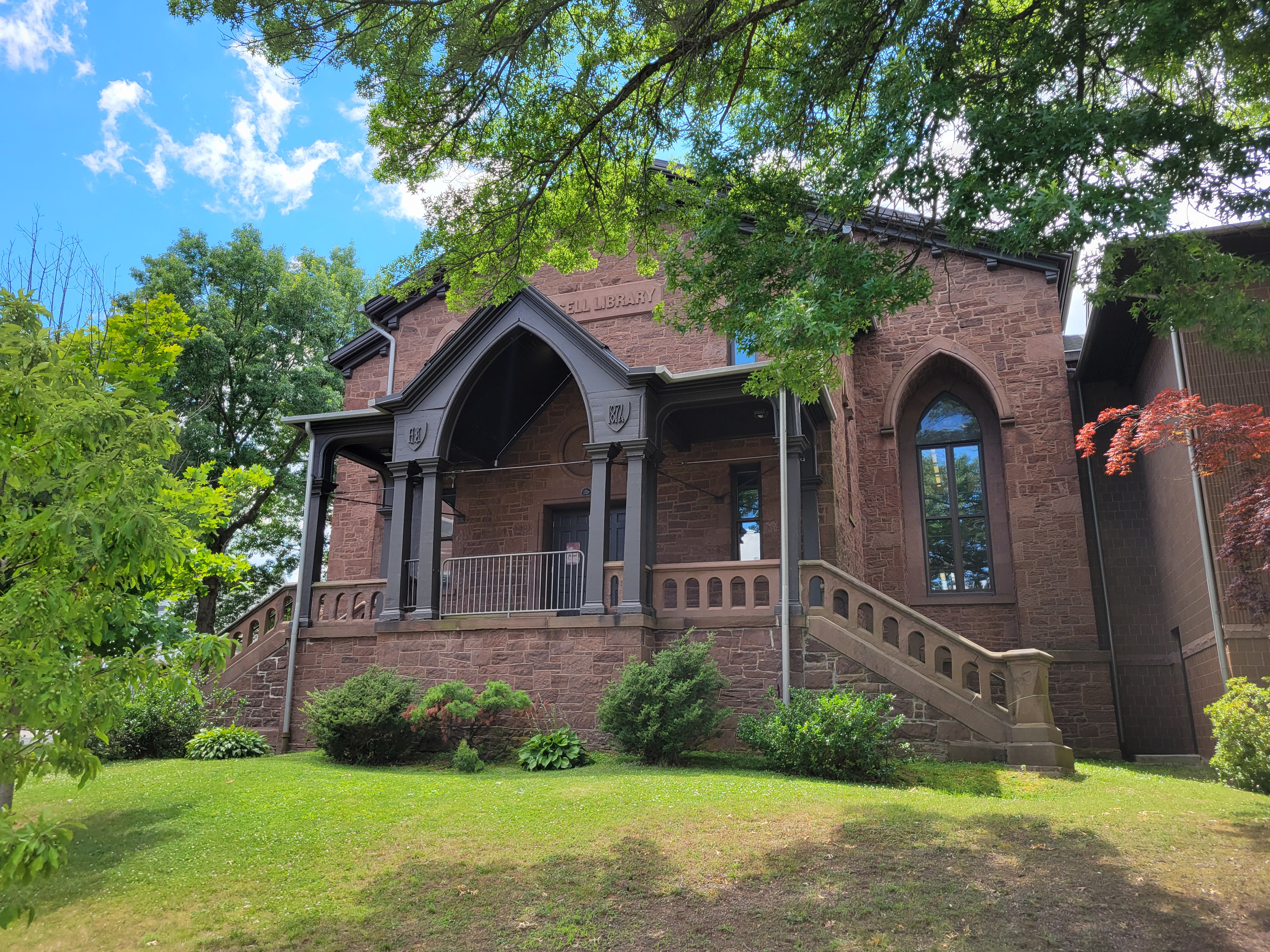
Russell Library

Russell Library is an 1876 library located at 123 Broad Street in Middletown, Connecticut, United States.

== History ==
In 1876, Frances Ann (née Osborne) Russell established Russell Library in memory of her husband, the prominent merchant Samuel Russell of Russell & Co. Frances purchased the Church of the Holy Trinity on the corner of Broad and Court Streets in Middletown and remodeled it in the Gothic Revival Style.

The building opened on April 5, 1876 as the public library for the City of Middletown. In 1896, David Ross of East Haddam, who served with the Confederate Army during the U.S. Civil War, donated his sword to the Library's war relic museum.

=== Additions ===
In 1930, what is known as the "Hubbard wing" was added to the structure. In 1972, the First Federal Saving and Loan Association of Meriden was remodeled as the Children's Library and, in 1983, the main structure and the Children's Library were connected.

In 1997 and 1999, the library purchased an adjacent building on Court Street and Broad Street, respectively, for offices in order to accommodate needs and future expansion, if needed.
