= David Hoadley (architect) =

American architect

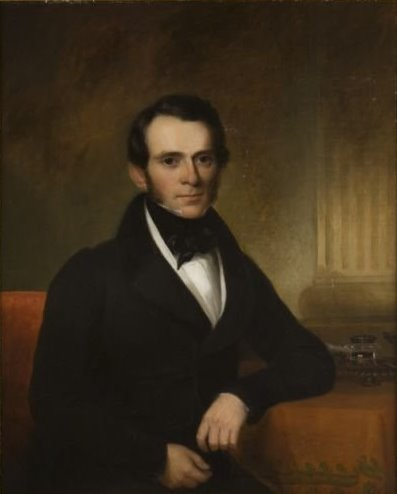
- Born: April 29, 1774; Waterbury, Connecticut
- Died: July 1839 (aged 65); Waterbury, Connecticut
- Occupation: Architect
- Buildings: North Church (United Church on the Green), New Haven, Connecticut; Congregational Church, Orange, Connecticut

David Hoadley (April 29, 1774 – 1839) was an American architect who worked in New Haven and Middlesex counties in Connecticut.

== Career ==
Born in Waterbury, Connecticut, the son of Lemuel and Urania (Mallory) Hoadley, he began as a carpenter and builder. He was a descendant of William Hoadley of Branford, Connecticut and a cousin of Silas Hoadley, the clockmaker. His son, David, was a banking and railroad executive instrumental in the completion of the Panama Railroad.

Hoadley was self-taught. In 1795, he is already credited with the design of the Congregational and Episcopal churches in Waterbury. Another early design was the Col. William Leavenworth Mansion in Waterbury, built in 1800, which stood until 1905. He also designed and built the Judge William Bristol House, facing the New Haven Green (built between 1800–1802). Although the building was razed, the house's doorway was preserved and is in the Metropolitan Museum of Art. He also built a house for Judge John Kingsbury in Waterbury in 1805.

Hoadley was married only a few months to Jane Hull, who died in 1799. Then, in 1805, he married Rachel Beecher of Kent, who survived him.

He moved to New Haven in 1814 to build the landmark North Church on the New Haven Green. He built many houses in New Haven, most of which are no longer standing, as well as the Tontine Hotel, now the site of the federal courthouse. Hoadley also designed churches in the nearby towns of Bethany (1809), Orange (1810), Norfolk (1815), and Milford (1823). A number of other churches in Connecticut are attributed to him. Later, Hoadley returned to Waterbury for the remainder of his life.

While Hoadley had no formal schooling and is dismissed as merely a “builder” by some, others point to his genius in the use of wood for classical detail and his unsurpassed buildings, particularly the North Church.

He was originally interred at the Grand Street burial ground in Waterbury, Connecticut. His remains were re-interred to Riverside Cemetery in Waterbury in July 1891.

== Selected works ==
- Congregational Church, Orange, Connecticut
- Bristol House, New Haven, Connecticut
- United Church on the Green (North Church), New Haven, Connecticut
- Samuel Wadsworth Russell House, 1828, Middletown, Connecticut (with Ithiel Town)
- Col. Daniel Beecher House, Naugatuck, Connecticut, demolished.
- Darius Beecher House, Bethany, Connecticut. Noted for its delicate paneling, mantelpieces, and ballroom.
- Ebenezer Johnson house, New Haven
- Tontine Hotel, New Haven (1824,1827 – about 1930). Built and probably designed. The Tontine was a large hotel on the southeast end of the green.

Properties designed by Hoadley which survive and which are listed on the U.S. National Register of Historic Places include:

- Avon Congregational Church, Avon, Connecticut
- Brown Tavern, George Washington Tpke., Burlington, Connecticut
- One or more properties in Cheshire Historic District, Roughly bounded by Main St., Highland Ave., Wallingford Rd., S. Main, Cornwall, and Spring Sts., Cheshire, Connecticut
- First Congregational Church of Cheshire, 111 Church Dr., Cheshire, Connecticut
- One or more properties in Orange Center Historic District, Roughly Orange Center Rd. from Orange Cemetery to Nan Dr., Orange, Connecticut
- Samuel Wadsworth Russell House, 350 High St., Middletown, Connecticut
- Wheeler-Beecher House, 562 Amity Rd., Bethany, Connecticut

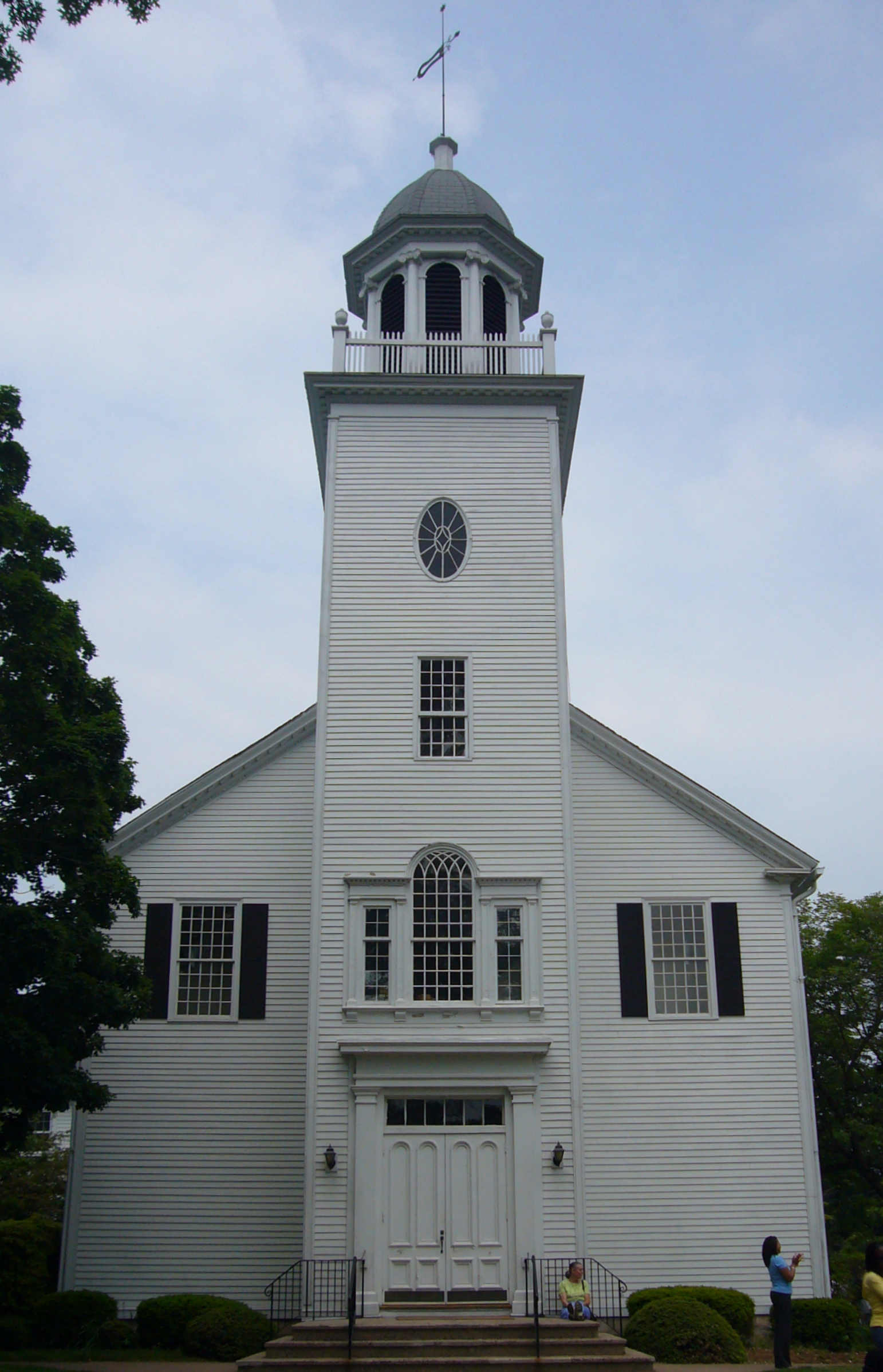
Orange Congregational Church, Orange, CT
