= Managed Mobility Services =

Managed Mobility Services (MMS) is a term used by analysts and businesses to describe the outsourcing and managing services that many businesses provide.

Mobility Managed Services includes the IT and process management service needed for a company to acquire, provision and support smartphones, tablets and other field force devices. These services are designed to support devices for corporations are liable and provide a level of control to companies that support them by accessing corporate resources and information.

Managed Mobility Services has existed for some time, but organizations have increasingly shifted responsibility for logistics and management as the environments have become more diverse and updates more frequent. Android fragmentation is sometimes cited as a driver of this growth as is the consumerization of IT, including the adoption of mobile devices by IT departments. This accumulation of influences has been referred to as "The 3 V's": Volume (the number of devices and users involved); Variety (policy changes in order to fit changing standards) and Volatility (high rates of change that could threaten the business).

== Included service categories ==
Gartner includes the following categories of services:

- Sourcing and logistics management
- Mobile service management
- Device and system management
- Application and collaboration management
- Security and content management
- Program and financial management

== History ==
Gartner first officially produced research on MMS in 2011 with Critical Capabilities for Managed Mobility Services, 22 December 2011, G00225198 Analyst(s): Eric Goodness, Phillip Redman.

Since then Gartner, Forrester Research, GigaOM and other analyst organizations have published research on these services, each with slight variations on what services are included.

== See also ==
- Mobile virtual private network
