= The Preserve =

Open space in Connecticut, United States

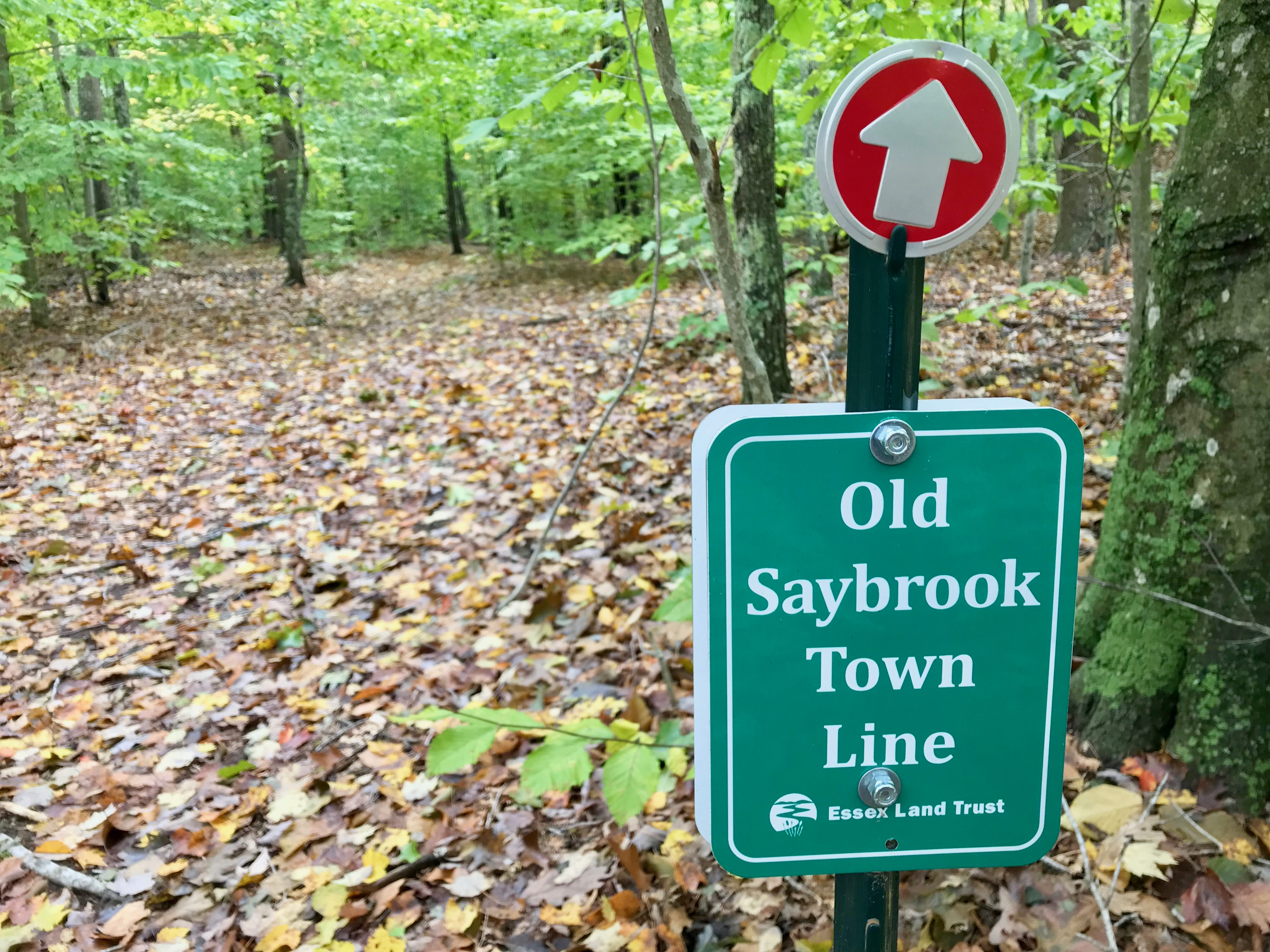
- Boundary sign between Old Saybrook and Essex in "The Preserve".

- Location within Connecticut Location within the United States
- Location: Essex, Old Saybrook & Westbrook, Connecticut, United States
- Coordinates: 41°19′09″N 72°24′54″W
- Area: 963 acres (390 ha)
- Elevation: 131 ft (40 m)
- Established: 2016
- Administrator: Connecticut Department of Energy and Environmental Protection and Essex Land Trust
- Website: The Preserve

The Preserve is a 963-acre open space preserve spanning the towns of Old Saybrook, Essex, and Westbrook, Connecticut. The property is owned by the State of Connecticut, Town of Old Saybrook, and the Essex Land Trust. It was protected in 2015 by The Trust for Public Land after an agreement to purchase the property from River Sound Development, LLC, was reached in 2013.

According to the Connecticut Department of Energy and Environmental Protection, The Preserve, prior to its protection, was "the largest remaining unprotected coastal forest between Boston and New York." The Essex Land Trust notes that The Preserve's protected ecosystems include wetlands, vernal pools, and mature coastal forests and that it is home to a diverse population of "25 species of amphibians, 30 kinds of mammals and 57 different birds". It plays an important role in maintaining the water quality of Trout Brook, as well as the Oyster and Mud rivers. Ten miles of hiking trails span northern and central parts of the property.

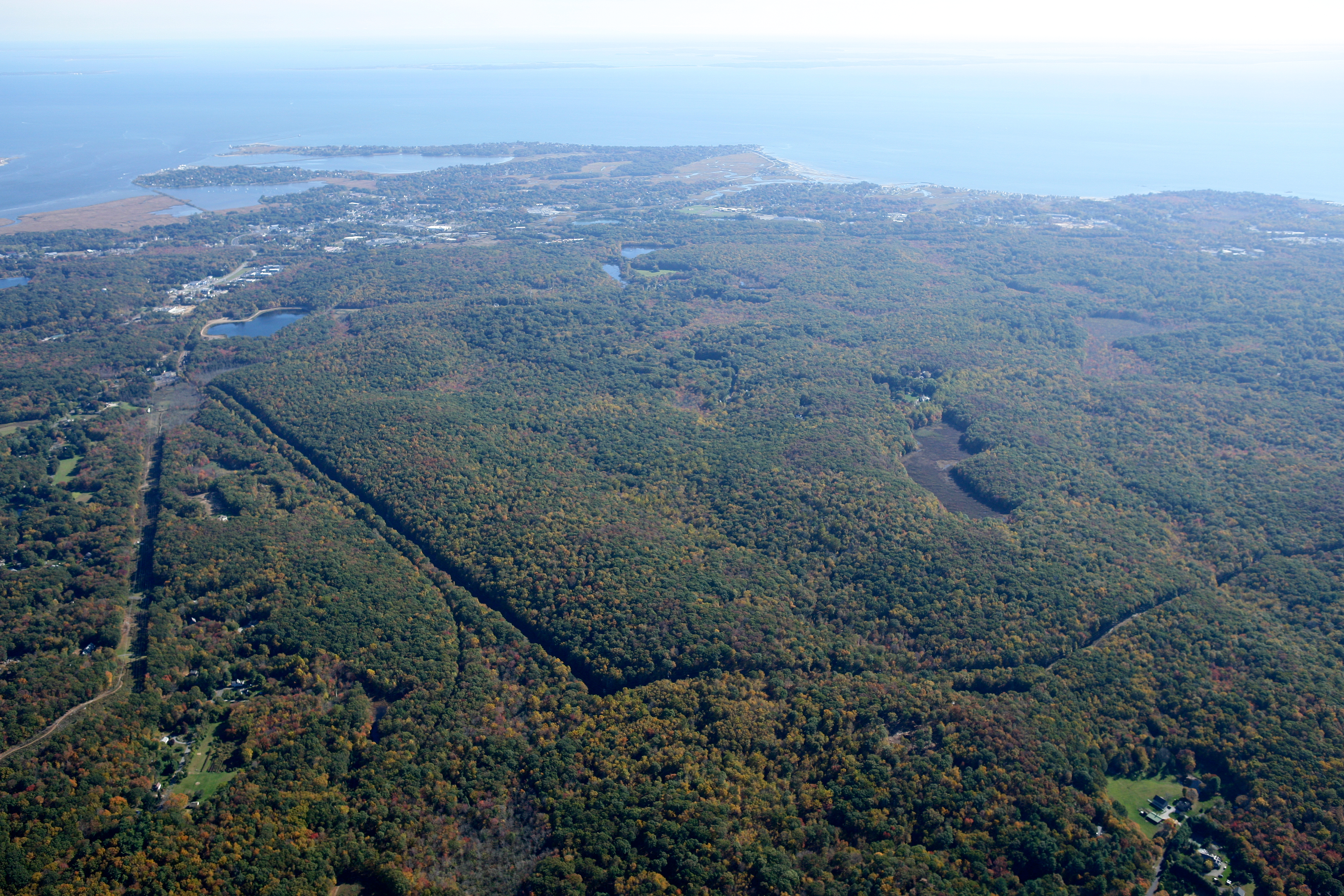
Aerial view of The Preserve and Long Island Sound
