= William Huntington Russell =

American politician

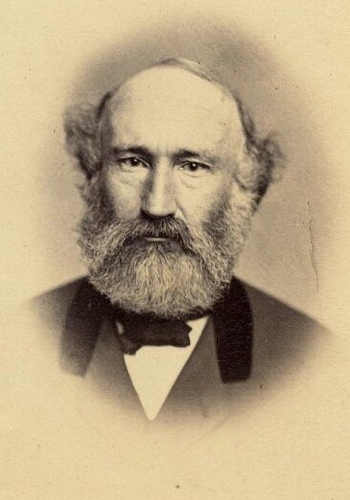

Member of the Connecticut House of Representatives for New Haven
- In office 1846–1847

Personal details
- Born: 12 August 1809 Middletown, Connecticut, US
- Died: 19 May 1885 (aged 75) New Haven, Connecticut, US
- Resting place: Grove Street Cemetery; 41°18′44.532″N 72°55′33.6″W
- Party: Whig, Republican
- Spouse: Mary Elizabeth Hubbard
- Relatives: Samuel Russell (cousin)
- Education: Yale University
- Occupation: Businessman, educator, politician
- Known for: Co-founder of Yale secret society Skull & Bones

William Huntington Russell (12 August 1809 – 19 May 1885) was an American businessman, educator, and politician. Notably, he was a co-founder of the Yale University secret society Skull and Bones, along with Alphonso Taft.

== Early life ==
Russell was born in Middletown, Connecticut, on 12 August 1809. He was the eighth of thirteen children born to Mary (née Huntington) Russell (1769–1857) and Matthew Talcott Russell (1761–1828), a Justice of the Peace who served as the State's Attorney for Middlesex County and the treasurer of Middletown. Among his siblings were sisters Mary Huntington Russell and Harriet Russell (the wife of George Larned).

He was a descendant of several old New England families, including those of Huntington, Pierpont, Hooker, Willett, Bingham, and Russell. His ancestor, Rev. Noadiah Russell, was a founder and original trustee of Yale College. William's older cousin, Samuel Russell, founded the successful merchant trading firm Russell & Co. in 1823, but William was never associated with this firm.

Russell was a cadet at Alden Partridge's American Literary, Scientific and Military Academy (later Norwich University) from 1826 until graduation in 1828, where he was taught under strict military discipline. In 1828, William's father died. Despite being under severe financial restraints, he entered Yale College, graduating in 1833.

== Career ==
Russell had planned on entering the ministry, but his financial problems forced him to obtain an immediate income through teaching. Therefore, from September 1833 to May 1835, he taught in Princeton, New Jersey, before entering a tutorship at Yale. In September 1836, he opened a private prep school for boys in a small dwelling house. The school would become known as the New Haven Collegiate and Commercial Institute. Initially, the school was only attended by a small number of boys, but by the time of Russell's death the school had become well known and had graduated around 4,000 boys. While running the Institute, Russell returned to Yale where was graduated from the Yale School of Medicine in 1838 with a M.D. degree.

In about 1840, Russell introduced a very thorough military drill and discipline into his school. He foresaw a Civil War in the future, and wanted to make sure his boys were prepared to fight for the Union. His students were so well schooled in military affairs that on the outbreak of the Civil War some were enlisted as drill instructors. He also served on the Board of Visitors appointed by the Secretary of War in 1863 to inspect and produce a report on West Point. Ralph Waldo Emerson and Henry Barnard also served on this committee.

He not only gave his students to the Union army, but also his own services. Governor William Alfred Buckingham realized that Russell was one of the most knowledgeable men in military affairs. For this reason, Russell was hired to organize the Connecticut militia. He was later made a major-general by act of the legislature in April 1862.

=== Political career ===
From 1846 to 1847, Russell served as a Whig in the Connecticut state legislature, representing New Haven. Upon the repeal of the Missouri Compromise in 1854, he became active as one of the leaders of the movement which resulted in the organization of the Republican Party. Russell served as Collector of Internal Revenue for New Haven and Middlesex Counties from December 1868 to 1873.

He was a strong abolitionist and a friend of John Brown. Russell was named as a trustee in the will of John Brown. He was also the Connecticut representative on the National Kansas Committee.

== Later life ==
In 1856, with several other Bonesmen, he incorporated Skull and Bones as the Russell Trust, later the Russell Trust Association. The Russell Trust Association is a tax-exempt association; it holds possession of the Skull and Bones Hall at Yale University and the society's holiday island, Deer Island.

== Personal life ==
On 19 August 1836, Russell was married to Mary Elizabeth Hubbard (1816–1890). Mary was a daughter of Lucy Hubbard and Dr. Thomas Hubbard, a professor of Surgery at the Yale Medical School. Together, they were the parents of ten children, six of whom survived him, including:

- Frances Harriet Russell (1839–1889)
- Talcott Huntington Russell (1847–1917), a lawyer who married Geraldine Whittemore Low.
- Thomas Hubbard Russell (1851–1916), a doctor who married Mary Katie Munson.
- Philip Gray Russell (1854–1900), who married Lilean Kendall, a daughter of John Edward Kendall.
- Edward Hubbard Russell (1855–1928)
- Robert Gray Russell (1860–1881)

In May 1885, Russell saw some boys throwing stones at birds in the park in New Haven, Connecticut. Russell sought to protect the birds from the boys. The activity was too much for him and he fell unconscious from a fatal rupture of a blood vessel and died several days later.
