= SEE International =

US-based nonprofit organization

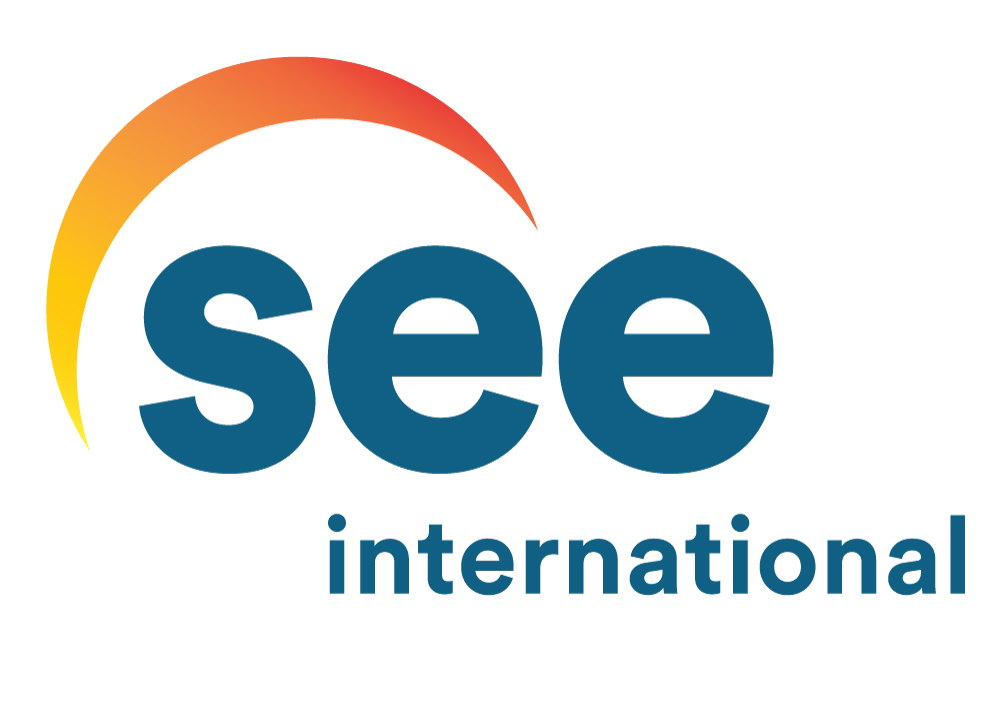
- Founded: August 26, 1974; 51 years ago
- Type: non-profit, non-governmental organization
- Purpose: Eliminating Preventable Blindness
- Location: Santa Barbara, California, United States
- Region served: International and Local
- Key people: Harry S. Brown
- Website: www.seeintl.org

Surgical Eye Expeditions International, or SEE International, is a nonprofit humanitarian organization based in Santa Barbara, California, that provides accessible vision care services to underserved communities internationally and in the United States. The organization was founded in 1974 by Dr. Harry S. Brown, and it connects over 700 volunteer ophthalmologists and other allied health professionals with host clinic sites around the world. These volunteer medical professionals travel to host clinic sites to participate in sight-restoring programs and educate local doctors to help create sustainable vision care systems in the areas. Its objective is to provide quality eye care and sight-restoring surgeries in communities that are overwhelmed with large populations of individuals who cannot afford, or do not have access to, this form of medical care. Since its establishment, SEE has screened over 4 million individuals and completed over 500,000 surgeries in over 85 countries.

SEE's programs focus on eliminating preventable blindness by treating an array of eye diseases and vision impairments without monetary cost to patients. Since 2006, SEE has facilitated courses to train ophthalmologists in the Manual Small Incision Cataracts Surgery (MSICS) technique. This low-cost surgical technique is self-sealing and does not require sutures or high-grade medical technology, making it advantageous to use in the developing world. SEE organizes MSICS courses consisting of two levels that train dozens of medical professionals in the technique every year.

SEE's funding comes from individual donors, corporate donors, and foundation grants. In the United States, it is classified by the IRS as a 501(c)(3) tax-exempt charity. It is also a GuideStar Platinum Participant.

== Programs ==
=== International ===
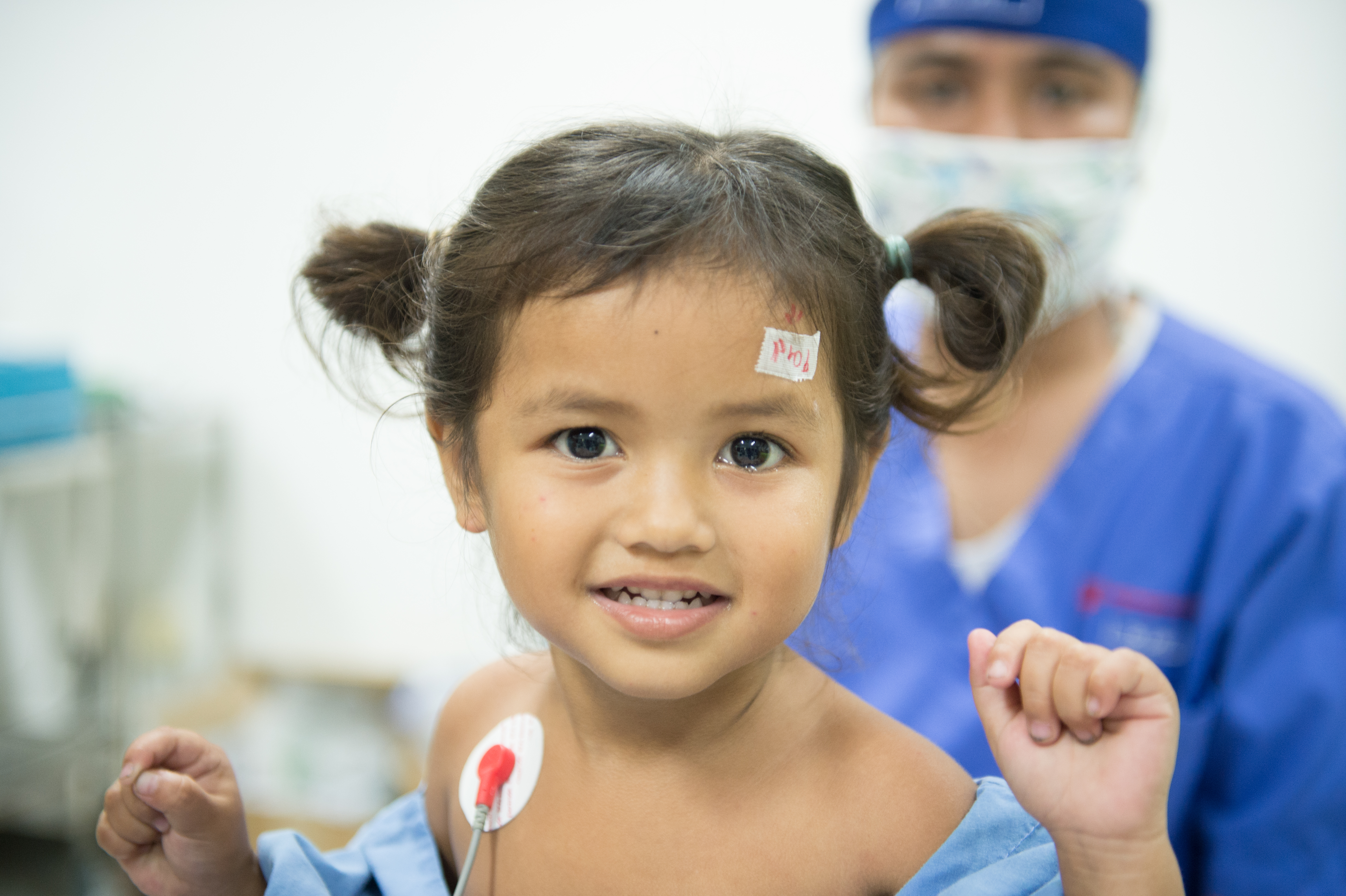
SEE Patient in Phnom Penh, Cambodia. January 2019.

SEE coordinates short-term medical expeditions all over the world at the request of ophthalmologists in host countries where access to vision care is scarce. SEE's volunteer ophthalmologists work with the host eye surgeons. In 2019, SEE performed over 55,000 surgeries in 40 countries.

=== U.S. ===
SEE partners with various U.S. clinics that offer comprehensive eye exams, including A Promise to Peru, Artists for World Peace, California CareForce, Vision Health International, and VOSH International. SEE's surgical partners include the Alicia Surgery Center and Harvard Eye Associates.

=== Santa Barbara Vision Care ===
Established in the 1980s, SEE's Santa Barbara Vision Care (SBVC) provides free eye care at clinics held two or three days per week. Per day, each clinic serves 10–15 uninsured individuals, providing glasses, surgeries, eye exams, and treatments. In 2012, SBVC provided care to 1,247 patients; in 2017, it provided care to more than 2,500. SBVC has clinics in Santa Barbara, Ventura, Oxnard, and Santa Maria, California.

SBVC runs several campaigns such as Children's Sight Week and Veterans Week throughout the year that target specific demographics. In August 2019, SEE held its third annual Children's Sight Week, providing 1,832 eye screenings and 54 comprehensive eye exams to local children.

== Awards and recognition ==
In the December 10, 2001 issue of Forbes, SEE International was cited in the Charity Investment Guide for its 99% efficiency as a charity, meaning that financially almost nothing is lost to overhead. On June 22, 2015, the United Nations General Assembly announced that SEE affiliate Dr. Helena Ndume was selected to receive the first-ever United Nations Nelson Rolihlahla Mandela Prize. According to General Assembly President Sam Kutesa:

The prize recognizes the achievements of those who dedicate their lives to the service of humanity by promoting UN purposes and principles while honouring Nelson Mandela's extraordinary life and legacy of reconciliation, political transition and social transformation.

In 2016, the International Agency for the Prevention of Blindness (IAPB) recognized SEE volunteer Dr. Janak M. Shah, M.D., as an Eye Health Hero. Shah has collaborated with SEE on over 140 ophthalmic expeditions worldwide, the most out of any SEE surgeon to date. The purpose of the Eye Health Heroes program is "to celebrate eye care practitioners and front line staff whose everyday efforts behind the scenes are making a real difference towards Universal Eye Health." Shah and other Eye Health Heroes will be recognized at the 10th General Assembly of the IAPB, in Durban, South Africa, October 27–30, 2016.
