= Darcey Silva =

American television personality (born 1974)

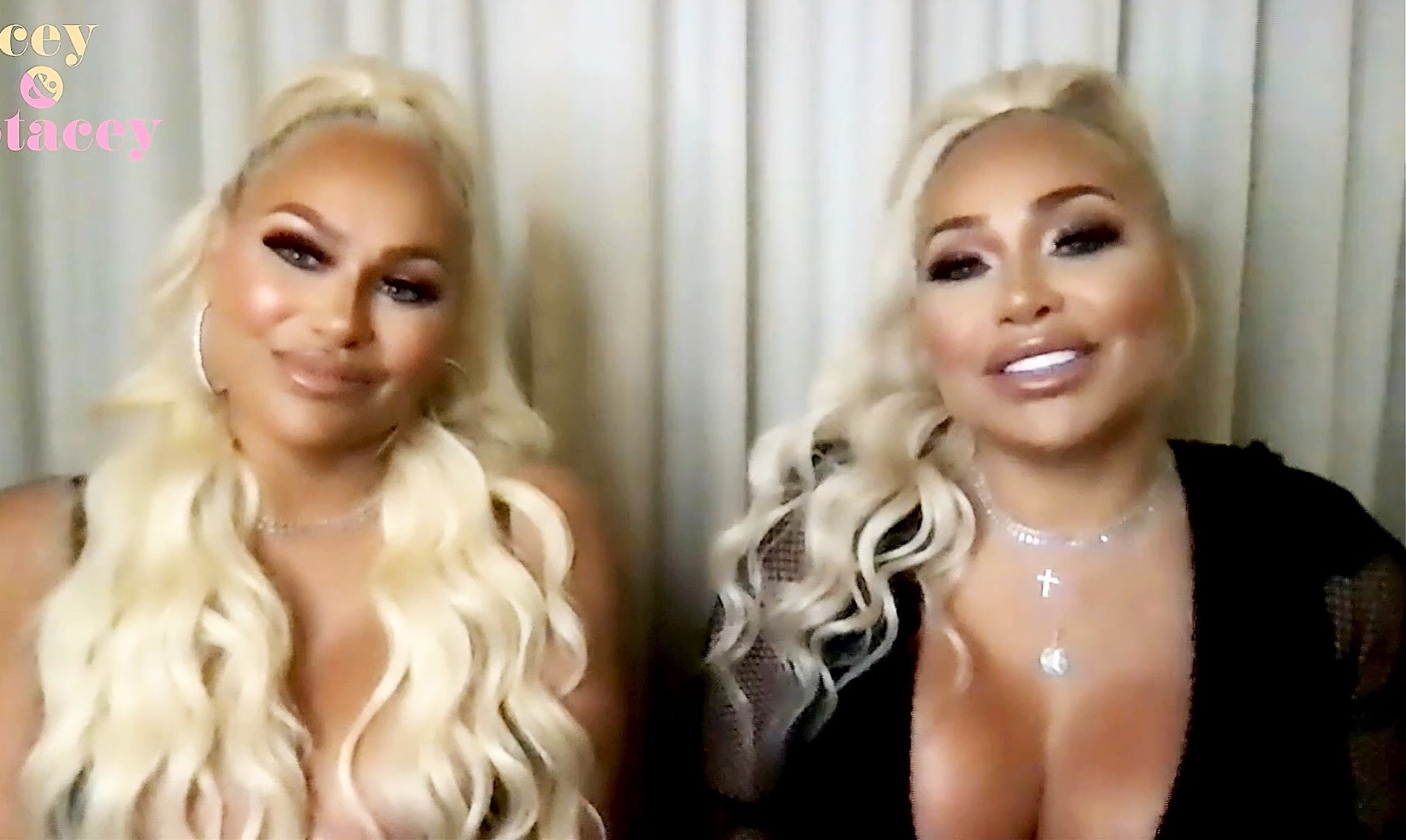
- Darcey (left) and Stacey Silva in 2021
- Born: September 23, 1974 (age 51); Middletown, Connecticut, U.S.
- Occupations: Television personality, actress, clothing designer, entrepreneur
- Years active: 2010–present
- Notable work: 90 Day Fiancé; Darcey & Stacey
- Spouse(s): Frank Bollok (divorced); Georgi Rusev (m. 2023)
- Children: 2

Darcey Silva (born September 23, 1974) is an American television personality, clothing designer and actress. She is best known for her role on TLC's reality television shows 90 Day Fiancé: Before the 90 Days and Darcey & Stacey.

== Early life ==
Silva was born on September 23, 1974, to Nancy and Mike Silva. She has a twin sister, Stacey. Her brother died of cancer on July 11, 1998. She has attended University of Houston and Marshall University. She studied acting at the Lee Strasberg Theatre and Film Institute in New York City from 1998 to 2001.

== Career ==
Darcey and her sister Stacey co-founded a clothing brand called House of Eleven in October 2010. In 2021, the company expanded into home goods, beauty and shoes. House of Eleven is an online store and the sisters are often seen wearing the items on their television show.

They also have a production company, Eleventh Entertainment. The sisters served as co-executive producers with their father, Mike Silva, on the comedy film White T (2013), starring Jerod and Jamal Mixon. The sisters provided background vocals for one song on White T. Eleventh Entertainment and AmVic Entertainment also produced the film Soul Ties (2015). In 2018, Silva and her sister released their debut dance-pop song, called "Lock Your Number." Their second song, "Always In My Heart" was released the following year. The song was a tribute to their late brother.

Silva gained popularity through her appearances on the TLC's 90 Day Fiancé: Before the 90 Days (2017–2020), which follows several couples as they meet for the first time after connecting online. She has appeared in several 90 Day Fiancé spin-offs, including Self-Quarantined, Pillow Talk and B90 Strikes Back!. On June 29, 2020, Entertainment Weekly announced that Silva and her sister Stacey are getting their own reality show called Darcey & Stacey. The sisters and their family appeared in an exclusive interview and photo shoot for Entertainment Weekly, when they announced their new show. The series followed their family life, love and relationships. She was a guest on Jenny McCarthy's SiriusXM radio show in August 2020. She was nominated for "Reality Star of 2020" at the 2020 People's Choice Awards. In 2023, Darcey & Stacey was cancelled and the show's fourth and final season premiered on January 23, 2023.

== Personal life ==
Silva has two daughters, Aniko and Aspen with her former husband. In 2021, her daughter Aniko competed in the Miss Connecticut Teen USA beauty pageant.

In June 2020, Silva got engaged to Bulgarian fitness model and masseur Georgi Rusev. The couple announced their engagement in an exclusive interview and photo shoot for People magazine on October 14, 2020. On February 28, 2022, Silva confirmed that she had ended her engagement with Rusev. She married Rusev on November 11, 2023.

== Filmography ==
Television and film roles
Year	Title	Role	Notes
2013	White T	Chanel	Also executive producer
2017	Who RU Wearing?	Herself	Television film
2017–2020	90 Day Fiancé: Before the 90 Days	Herself	51 episodes
2019	90 Day Fiancé: Pillow Talk	Herself	11 episodes
2020	90 Day Fiancé: B90 Strikes Back!	Herself	12 episodes
2020	90 Day Fiancé: Self Quarantined	Herself	Episode: "Life on Pause"
2020–2023	Darcey & Stacey	Herself	Main role; 43 episodes

== Awards and nominations ==
Year	Association	Category	Work	Result
2020	People's Choice Awards	Reality Star of 2020 (shared with Stacey Silva)	Darcey & Stacey	Nominated
2022	American Reality Television Awards	Reality Royalty (shared with Stacey Silva)	Darcey & Stacey	Won
