= Helena Ndume =

Namibian ophthalmologist

- Born: Helena Ndaipovanhu Ndume; 1960 (age 65–66); Tsumeb, Namibia
- Education: University of Leipzig
- Known for: notable for her charitable work among sufferers of eye-related illnesses in Namibia
- Awards: Red Cross International Humanitarian Service Award (2009); Grand Commander of the Order of Namibia First Class
- Scientific career
- Fields: Ophthalmology

Helena Ndaipovanhu Ndume (born 1960) is a Namibian ophthalmologist, notable for her charitable work among sufferers of eye-related illnesses in Namibia. To date, Ndume has ensured that some 30,000 blind Namibians have received eye surgery and are fitted with intra-ocular lens implants free of charge. Ndume is currently the head of the ophthalmology department at Windhoek Central Hospital, Namibia's largest hospital, and is one of only six Namibian ophthalmologists. She was listed as one of BBC's 100 women during 2018. Her biggest goal in life is to end preventable blindness and to build a team of committed young people to carry on with the mission even when she is not here.

== Early life and education ==
Ndume was born in Tsumeb, Oshikoto Region in 1960. She studied medicine in University of Leipzig, before returning to Namibia in 1989 to complete a medical internship. She later returned to Germany, to specialise in ophthalmology at the University of Saarland.

== Work in Namibia ==
In 1995, Ndume was introduced to Surgical Eye Expeditions International, and set about starting a project in Namibia. In August 1997, the first eye camp was held at Rundu, Kavango Region. Currently, four or five eye camps are held each year in different locations.

== Work with the Namibia Red Cross Society ==
For six years, from 2001 to 2007, Ndume was vice chairperson of the Namibia Red Cross Society. In 2009, she was honoured with a humanitarian award by the NRCS for her work in restoring sight to those blinded by cataracts.

== Work with SEE International ==
Ndume has volunteered with sight-restoring nonprofit SEE International since 1995. Since then, SEE International and Ndume have collaborated to hold free week-long eye clinics in Namibia, typically twice every year. These clinics provide free eye surgeries for approximately 300 impoverished men, women, and children.

== Personal life ==
Ndume is married to Dr. Solomon Guramatunhu, who is also an eye specialist. She has one son.

== Awards and recognition ==
- Lions Club International Humanitarian Award (2022)
- The Forbes Woman Africa Social Impact Award (2022)
- Helena Ndume and Jorge Fernando Branco Sampaio of Portugal became the first recipients of the United Nations Nelson Mandela Prize on 22 June 2015.
- Grand Commander of the Order of Namibia First Class;
- Red Cross International Humanitarian Service Award (2009);
- Rotary International Humanitarian Award in the fight against blindness (2008);
- Namibia National Science Award (2005);
- Humanitarian award in the prevention of blindness in Santa Barbara, California, USA (2001);
- Lions International Award in recognition of sincere and devoted efforts with Lions Operation Brightsight Project (1999).
