= Smith Park (Middletown, Connecticut) =

Park in Connecticut, United States

Coordinates: 41.567°N 72.715°W

A hiking trail at Smith Park

Smith Park is a park in Middletown, Connecticut, United States, which was acquired by the town in 1974. It is located on the north side of Country Club Road in Middletown. Comprising 50 acres (200,000 m^{2}) of land, it includes ball fields, a playground, hiking trails, horseshoe pits, shuffleboards, and a pavilion.

Permission can be obtained from the Middletown Park and Recreation Commission to host a family outing or company picnic at the pavilion, though wheelchair access is limited. The park is closed at sunset and the gates are locked.

There is a wetland meadow that has shrubs like silky dogwood, winterberry, buttonbush, and Northern highbush blueberry. In the center of the woodland there is a small pond.

== Resources ==
- Middletown Conservation Commission. Middletown Trail Guide. December 2004.
