= Liberty Bank =

Mutual savings bank based in Connecticut, US

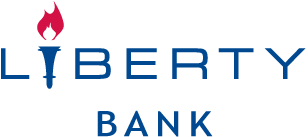
- Type: Bank
- Industry: Mutual savings bank
- Founded: 1825 (as Middletown Savings Bank)
- Headquarters: Middletown, Connecticut, United States
- Number of locations: 63 (2021)
- Key people: David W. Glidden (CEO)
- Website: liberty-bank.com

Liberty Bank locations in Connecticut as of 2017

Liberty Bank is the oldest mutual savings bank in the United States, as well as the third largest bank in Connecticut. Liberty Bank is headquartered in Middletown, Connecticut and has 62 banking offices throughout the state, and one in western Massachusetts. Liberty Bank offers consumer and commercial banking, home mortgages, insurance, and investment services.

== History ==
Established in 1825 as Middletown Savings Bank, in 1844, an account was opened with a balance of $26, and left untouched for 150 years until it was finally closed in 1994. By that time it was the oldest direct descendancy savings account in the United States and had grown to over $32,000 on interest alone.

The Liberty Bank Foundation was established in 1997 to provide grants to non-profit organizations which improve the quality of life for people of low or moderate income.

In 2001, Liberty Bank merged with Hometown Bank, gaining their three offices, and added another new branch. In 2003, Liberty Bank broke ground on its first affordable housing complex: Uncas Condominiums, in Norwich. The company then opened another office, bringing the total number of branches to 34. In 2005, Liberty Bank introduced the state's first checking account to offer rebates of other banks' ATM surcharges. Liberty Bank added a branch in Wethersfield in 2008, one in Niantic in 2009, and relocated its Cromwell branch in 2010 and First Liberty Bank part of Liberty Bank.

In 2013, Liberty Bank merged with The Bank of Southern Connecticut, and thus gained four more branches: two in New Haven, one in Branford and one in North Haven (which merged with their existing North Haven branch). They also opened Bristol and Southington in 2013, bringing the total to 50 branches.

In 2021, it had $7.4 billion in assets, and an annual net income of $81.2 million. On March 4, 2019, The Hartford Courant reported that Liberty Bank was settling a lawsuit filed in 2018 by the Connecticut Fair Housing Center and the National Consumer Law Center, alleging violations of the Fair Housing Act. The lawsuit concerned race bias.
