= Oddfellows Playhouse =

Youth theater

Oddfellows Playhouse is a non-profit youth theater in Middletown, Connecticut. The playhouse provides programing to students of all ages, ranging from classic plays to circus skills. The organization serves over 1,200 young people annually and is Connecticut's largest and most active year-round youth theater.

== History ==
Oddfellows Playhouse was founded in 1975 by four Wesleyan University students with a commitment to serve students of all backgrounds. The name Oddfellows comes from the initial building the playhouse occupied, which was owned by the Independent Order of Odd Fellows.

In 1996, the playhouse bought and renovated a 10,000 square foot building on Washington Street in Middletown, with extensive help from the City of Middletown.

In 2017, ownership of the building the playhouse occupies was transferred to the City of Middletown, who granted Oddfellows Playhouse a 25-year lease at a rate of $1 per year. This was intended to stabilize the playhouse's financial problems as well as expand programing for city youth.

== Programing ==
Each year, the playhouse puts on two stage plays for each of their two age brackets: Junior Repertory Company (ages 12–14) and Teen Repertory Company (ages 14–20). Past shows have included classics such as Shakespeare's A Midsummer Night's Dream, plays such as those by Washington Irving, and musicals such as Urinetown.

In addition to the stage shows, the playhouse also conducts a children's circus camp each summer. Skills taught include clowning, acrobatics, dance, stilt-walking, juggling, unicycling, art and puppetry. The camp lasts five weeks and culminates in a live show with over 120 performers and a live band.

== Awards ==
Over the course of its 47-year history, Oddfellows Playhouse has been given numerous accolades. They were named "Community Champion" for youth services by Citizens Bank in 2003. CPTV featured the playhouse on a special called "art.culture.life". They were given an "Award of Excellence" in 1998 from The New England Theatre Conference. The NAACP gave the playhouse a "Community Service Award" in 1999. And in 2012, the playhouse was given an award from the National Endowment for the Arts. Oddfellows has also been named as one of "Connecticut’s Best Children’s Theaters" by Connecticut Magazine from 2013 to 2019.
