= Darcey & Stacey =

American reality television show

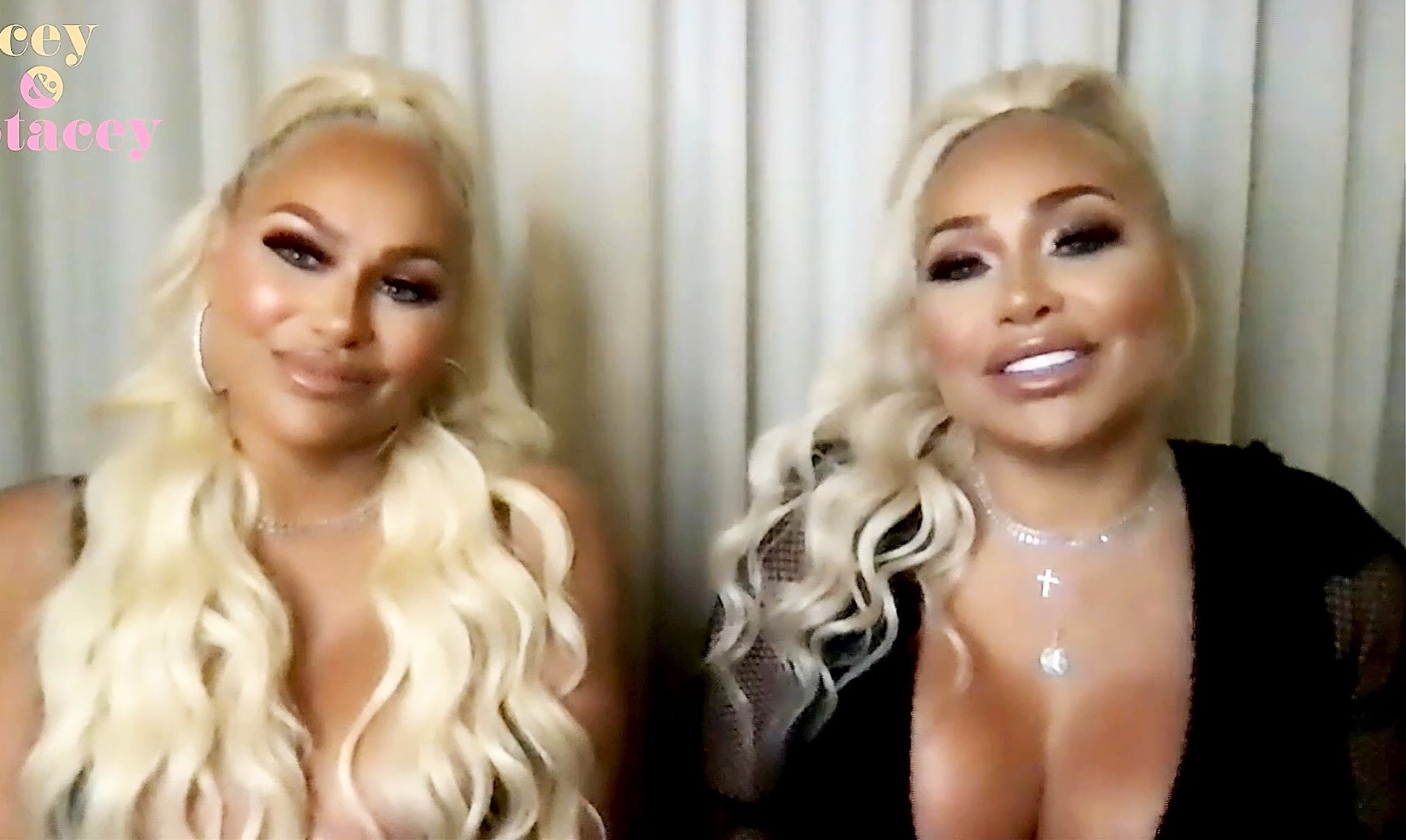
- Darcey and Stacey Silva in 2021
- Genre: Reality television
- Starring: Darcey Silva; Stacey Silva; Georgi Rusev; Florian Sukaj
- Theme music composer: Blake Phillips
- Opening theme: "Do It Big"
- Country of origin: United States
- Original language: English
- No. of seasons: 4
- No. of episodes: 43

Production
- Production location: Middletown, Connecticut
- Camera setup: Multi-camera
- Production company: Sharp Entertainment

Original release
- Network: TLC
- Release: August 16, 2020 – April 10, 2023

Darcey & Stacey is an American reality television show that premiered on TLC on August 16, 2020. The show stars 90 Day Fiancé: Before the 90 Days cast members and twins Darcey Silva and Stacey Silva. The series documents their family life, professional endeavors, love and relationships in Middletown, Connecticut. The show aired on TLC on Sundays at 10:00 pm. Darcey & Stacey: Inside the Episode showed behind-the-scenes footage about each episode and it aired on TLC on Mondays.

On October 27, 2020, TV Fanatic reported that the series was renewed for a second season after a "record-breaking freshman run". The second season premiered on July 19, 2021, and its after-show Darcey & Stacey: Pillow Talk premiered on July 23, 2021. The third season premiered on January 10, 2022. The show was cancelled in 2023 and the fourth and final season of Darcey & Stacey premiered on January 23, 2023.

== Overview ==
On June 29, 2020, Entertainment Weekly announced that Darcey Silva and her twin sister Stacey are getting their own reality show called Darcey & Stacey. The sisters and their family appeared in an exclusive interview and photo shoot for Entertainment Weekly, when they announced their new show. TLC released a 2-minute trailer of the show on July 21, 2020.

Darcey Silva, alongside sister Stacey, appeared on 90 Day Fiancé: Before the 90 Days for four seasons between 2017 and 2020. 90 Day Fiancé: Before the 90 Days documented Darcey's relationships with Jesse and later with Tom, but both relationships ended. Darcey and Stacey live in the same house with their children and the sisters got divorced from their former husbands on the same day.

== Premise ==
The series follows the lives of identical twins Darcey and Stacey Silva in Middletown, Connecticut. Stacey has two teenage sons and Darcey has two teenage daughters, Aniko and Aspen, who can be seen on the series. It regularly featured members of their family such as Darcey and Stacey's divorced parents, Mike and Nancy. The series focuses on Stacey's five-year relationship with her Albanian fiancé, Florian Sukaj and Darcey's new Bulgarian boyfriend, Georgi Rusev. Florian's K-1 visa was approved and he meets Stacey in New York City. Florian faces cheating accusations, when he is caught posing in pictures with another woman. Darcey and her new boyfriend Georgi began talking online and the two later met in Miami. Darcey explains on camera that Georgi is a masseur from Bulgaria, but he lives in Arlington, Virginia. Darcey and Georgi have an argument and she asks if Georgi has a secret child.

In the show's second season, Darcey is having issues with Georgi after learning that he was on "sugar mama websites" and he hid money in a sock. Darcey is also left hurt after Georgi reached out to her ex-boyfriend Jesse. Stacey and Florian discuss having children in the future and during a doctor's appointment Stacey finds out that she has a cyst on her ovary. In the season finale, the twins travel to Turkey to undergo plastic surgery and Darcey breaks up with Georgi. In a preview for the third season, Darcey's daughter Aniko, can be seen competing in a pageant while the twins are busy promoting their fashion line. During the show's third season, Darcey and Georgi attend couple's counseling and later announce plans to have a dual wedding with Stacey and Florian in Miami.

On November 4, 2022, People magazine released exclusive wedding photos of Stacey and Florian's second wedding at Saybrook Point Resort & Marina in Connecticut. People magazine also announced that Darcey & Stacey's fourth season would premiere on January 23, 2023, and would feature Stacey and Florian's wedding planning and ceremony.

== Reception ==
Darcey & Stacey has been a ratings success for TLC – the season premiere debuted with 2.1 million total viewers, while the second episode "Arrivals and Departures" was seen by 1.9 million total viewers. The second episode was the fifth most watched original cable telecast program on Sunday night, beating several shows such as Bravo's The Real Housewives of Potomac. The third episode "Meltdown in Middletown" attracted 2.02 million viewers and was the night's second most watched show on TLC. The show's first season ended its 10-week run on October 18, 2020, and it averaged a 2.11 rating with W25-54 and a 1.43 rating with P25-54. The series made TLC the number one cable network on Sunday nights, and averaged 2.5M P2+ viewers per episode.

Polish News called the sisters "fan-favorite stars", and Us Weekly commented that "90 Day Fiancé fans have always been crazy about Darcey Silva's journey to finding The One." Ahead of the show's third season, E! Online wrote: "The Silva family legacy is certainly at the heart of Darcey & Stacey, including looking to the next generation. Darcey's daughters, Aniko and Aspen, are set to reappear this season, with a focus on Aniko competing in the Miss Connecticut Teen USA competition." In 2020, News24 gave the show three out of five stars, commenting: "The twins are unapologetic about their quirks, often play up what's been said about them and have garnered a dedicated fan base - which includes superfans Chrissy Teigen and John Legend. And, they've got a fan in me too."

== Cast ==
=== Main cast ===
- Darcey Silva Darcey was engaged to masseur Georgi and has two daughters from a previous marriage.
- Stacey Silva, Stacey is married to Florian Sukaj and has two sons from a previous marriage.

=== Supporting cast ===
- Mike Silva, Darcey and Stacey's father
- Nancy Silva, Darcey and Stacey's mother, who is divorced from Mike
- Aniko Bollok, Darcey's daughter
- Aspen Bollok, Darcey's daughter
- Florian Sukaj, Stacey's fiancé of five years, who has been approved for a K-1 visa. They are now married.
- Georgi Rusev, Darcey's Bulgarian Ex fiancé. fitness model and masseuse.

== Episodes ==
=== Series overview ===
| Season | Episodes | Originally released | |
| Season | Episodes | First released | Last released |
|---|---|---|---|
| 1 | 10 | August 16, 2020 | October 18, 2020 |
| 2 | 11 | July 19, 2021 | September 27, 2021 |
| 3 | 9 | January 10, 2022 | March 7, 2022 |
| 4 | 13 | January 23, 2023 | April 10, 2023 |

=== Season 1 (2020) ===
| No. overall | No. in season | Title | Original release date | U.S. viewers (millions) |
|---|---|---|---|---|
| 1 | 1 | "Everything Is About To Change" | August 16, 2020 | 2.11 |
| 2 | 2 | "Arrivals and Departures" | August 23, 2020 | 1.91 |
| 3 | 3 | "Meltdown in Middletown" | August 30, 2020 | 2.02 |
| 4 | 4 | "Unfinished Business" | September 6, 2020 | 1.84 |
| 5 | 5 | "Clashes and Curve Balls" | September 13, 2020 | 1.83 |
| 6 | 6 | "Caught on Tape" | September 20, 2020 | 1.69 |
| 7 | 7 | "Race to the Altar" | September 27, 2020 | 1.90 |
| 8 | 8 | "Ultimate Betrayal" | October 4, 2020 | 1.86 |
| 9 | 9 | "First Impressions" | October 11, 2020 | 1.99 |
| 10 | 10 | "Trouble in Paradise" | October 18, 2020 | 1.78 |

=== Season 2 (2021) ===
| No. overall | No. in season | Title | Original release date | U.S. viewers (millions) |
|---|---|---|---|---|
| 11 | 1 | "You Only Know So Much" | July 19, 2021 | 0.68 |
| 12 | 2 | "Blinded by Love" | July 26, 2021 | 0.81 |
| 13 | 3 | "Digging Up the Past" | August 2, 2021 | 0.77 |
| 14 | 4 | "Lies and Ex-Wives" | August 9, 2021 | 1.16 |
| 15 | 5 | "Tears and Tantrums" | August 16, 2021 | 0.99 |
| 16 | 6 | "An Unwelcome Return" | August 23, 2021 | 1.02 |
| 17 | 7 | "Fights and Flights" | August 30, 2021 | 0.99 |
| 18 | 8 | "Reckless Exes" | September 6, 2021 | 1.06 |
| 19 | 9 | "Blow Up in Bodrum" | September 13, 2021 | 1.16 |
| 20 | 10 | "Shattered Dreams and Pageant Queens" | September 20, 2021 | 0.91 |
| 21 | 11 | "Trouble in Paradise" | September 27, 2021 | 1.02 |

=== Season 3 (2022) ===
| No. overall | No. in season | Title | Original release date | U.S. viewers (millions) |
|---|---|---|---|---|
| 22 | 1 | "Moving On and Bossing Up" | January 10, 2022 | 0.91 |
| 23 | 2 | "Pageant Mom Drama" | January 17, 2022 | N/A |
| 24 | 3 | "Pageant Crowned and Miami Bound" | January 24, 2022 | N/A |
| 25 | 4 | "For Love Or Money" | January 31, 2022 | 0.98 |
| 26 | 5 | "Feed 'Em to the 'Gators" | February 7, 2022 | 0.95 |
| 27 | 6 | "Big Moves and Small Bikinis" | February 14, 2022 | N/A |
| 28 | 7 | "Mic Drop" | February 21, 2022 | N/A |
| 29 | 8 | "The Twins Tell All Part 1" | February 28, 2022 | N/A |
| 30 | 9 | "The Twins Tell All Part 2" | March 7, 2022 | 1.06 |

=== Season 4 (2023) ===
| No. overall | No. in season | Title | Original release date | U.S. viewers (millions) |
|---|---|---|---|---|
| 31 | 1 | "Single Life & Sibling Strife" | January 23, 2023 | N/A |
| 32 | 2 | "Blow Ups & Blowhards" | January 30, 2023 | N/A |
| 33 | 3 | "Rollerblades & Shade" | February 6, 2023 | N/A |
| 34 | 4 | "Shocking News & Wedding Blues" | February 13, 2023 | N/A |
| 35 | 5 | "Drunken Slips & Loose Lips" | February 20, 2023 | N/A |
| 36 | 6 | "Pitches & Ditches" | February 27, 2023 | N/A |
| 37 | 7 | "Hits & Misses" | March 6, 2023 | N/A |
| 38 | 8 | "Roasted & Ghosted" | March 13, 2023 | N/A |
| 39 | 9 | "Hello & Goodbye" | March 20, 2023 | N/A |
| 40 | 10 | "Gin & Toxic" | March 27, 2023 | N/A |
| 41 | 11 | "Changing Plans & Body Slams" | April 3, 2023 | N/A |
| 42 | 12 | "I Do & I Don't" | April 3, 2023 | N/A |
| 43 | 13 | "Lies & Furious Brides" | April 10, 2023 | 0.76 |

== Specials ==
| Featured season | Title | Original release date | US viewers (millions) |
|---|---|---|---|
| 2 | "Anything for Love" | July 12, 2021 | 0.45 |
| 3 | "Catching Up With The Silva Twins" | January 3, 2022 | N/A |

== Inside the Episode ==
| No. | Title | Original release date | US viewers (millions) |
|---|---|---|---|
| 1 | "Inside the Episode: Everything Is About To Change" | August 17, 2020 | N/A |
| 2 | "Inside the Episode: Arrivals and Departures" | August 24, 2020 | N/A |
| 3 | "Inside the Episode: Meltdown in Middletown" | August 31, 2020 | N/A |
| 4 | "Inside the Episode: Unfinished Business" | September 7, 2020 | 1.09 |
| 5 | "Inside the Episode: Clashes and Curve Balls" | September 14, 2020 | 0.82 |
| 6 | "Inside the Episode: Caught on Tape" | September 21, 2020 | 0.78 |
| 7 | "Inside the Episode: Race to the Altar" | September 28, 2020 | 0.72 |
| 8 | "Inside the Episode: Ultimate Betrayal" | October 5, 2020 | 0.51 |
| 9 | "Inside the Episode: First Impressions and Last Chances" | October 12, 2020 | 0.59 |
| 10 | "Inside the Episode: Trouble in Paradise" | October 19, 2020 | 0.57 |

== Strike Back ==
- Darcey and Stacey Strike Back

== International broadcasts ==
| Country | Network | Series premiere | Timeslot |
|---|---|---|---|
| Finland | TLC | November 11, 2020 | Wednesdays 10:00 pm |
| Sweden | TLC Discovery+ | October 21, 2020 | Wednesdays 9:00 pm |
