= O'Rourke's Diner =

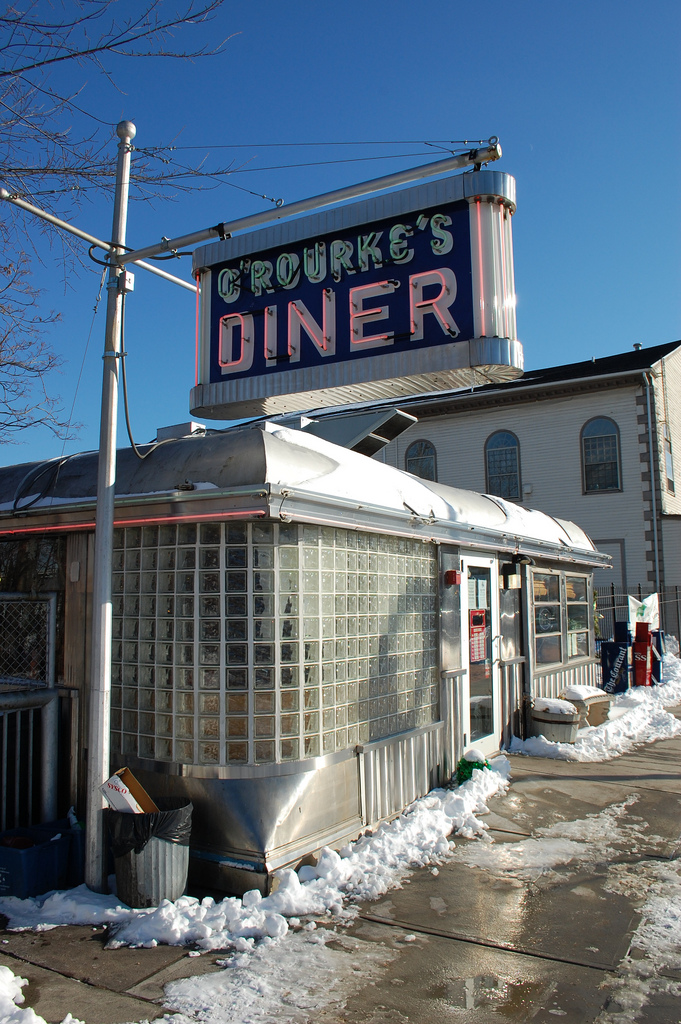

General information
- Architectural style: Art Deco
- Location: Middletown, Connecticut, United States
- Coordinates: 41.564732°N 72.651891°W
- Owner: John O'Rourke (1946-1976); Brian O'Rourke (1976-2023)

Design and construction
- Architect: Mountain View Diner Company

O'Rourke's Diner was a diner located in the Main Street Historic District in Middletown, Connecticut.

== History ==
The diner was established in 1941 by John O'Rourke, who later brought the 1946 Mountain View diner car that anchored the diner's distinctive appearance into Middletown. John's nephews, John and Brian bought the diner in 1976. In 1986, due to corrupted business practices, John sold his half share of the diner to his cousin Brian.

On August 31, 2006, O'Rourke's Diner suffered tremendous damage from a fire that broke out after a hamburger steamer was left on overnight. Because the diner did not have fire insurance, fundraising efforts were launched to cover the estimated $350,000 cost of repairs. By June 2007, $180,000 had been raised and preparations for reconstruction were underway. On February 11, 2008, following successful renovations which included assistance from the local community and Wesleyan University, O'Rourke's was reopened at 5:00 am.

In June 2023, the diner closed once again. As of October 2024, the diner has been listed for sale.

== Awards/Distinctions ==
- 2005: Best Diner, Best of Connecticut 2005, Connecticut Magazine
- 2008: Featured on Food Network's Diners, Drive-Ins and Dives with Guy Fieri.

== Dead External links ==
- Rebuilding O'Rourke's documentary
- O'Rourke's reviews on RoadFood.com
- O'Rourke's To Go restaurant website
