= Sebastian Giuliano =

American lawyer

The Honorable Sebastian N. Giuliano
- Giuliano at the 2011 Middletown mayoral debate

South Fire District Commissioner
- Incumbent
- Assumed office February 04, 2020

Member of the Middletown Common Council
- In office November 12, 2013 – November 12, 2019

Mayor of Middletown, Connecticut
- In office November 16, 2005 – November 15, 2011
- Preceded by: Domenique Thornton
- Succeeded by: Daniel T. Drew

Personal details
- Born: August 10, 1952 (age 73) Middletown, Connecticut, U.S.
- Party: Republican
- Spouse: Paula Giuliano (née Mian)
- Children: 3

Sebastian N. Giuliano (born August 10, 1952) was the mayor of Middletown, Connecticut from 2005 until 2011. Giuliano, a Republican and Middletown native, defeated Democratic incumbent Domenique Thornton by 807 votes in the 2005 election and was reelected in 2007 to a second two-year term. He won the election again in 2009, defeating Democratic Councilman Daniel T. Drew and served his last term.

Giuliano was defeated for reelection in 2011 by Democrat Daniel T. Drew, who succeeded him as mayor. In 2013, Giuliano ran and won a seat on the Middletown, Connecticut Common Council and served as the Minority Leader from 2013 until 2019. Giuliano decided to run for Mayor again in 2019; however, he was defeated by Democratic Party political newcomer Benjamin Florsheim in his bid to try and win back the Mayor's Office from the Democratic Party. In January 2020, Giuliano announced his Candidacy for an open seat on the South Fire District Commission which he won by the majority of the votes in the election that was held on February 3, 2020.

== Early life and education ==
Sebastian N. Giuliano was born and raised in Middletown, Connecticut the son of Nicholas and Florence (Misenti) Giuliano and his family has ties to Melilli. He graduated from Xavier High School (Connecticut) in 1970 and won an Appointment to West Point Academy which he received from then U.S. Senator Abraham Ribicoff and attended the Academy for two year and then transferred to Boston College where he received his bachelor's degree in English with a minor in Mathematics. He then went on to attend Law School at Catholic University of America where Giuliano received his Juris Doctor degree in 1978. He then moved back to Middletown where he opened a private law practice and married his wife, Paula who he met back in college. They have three children together.

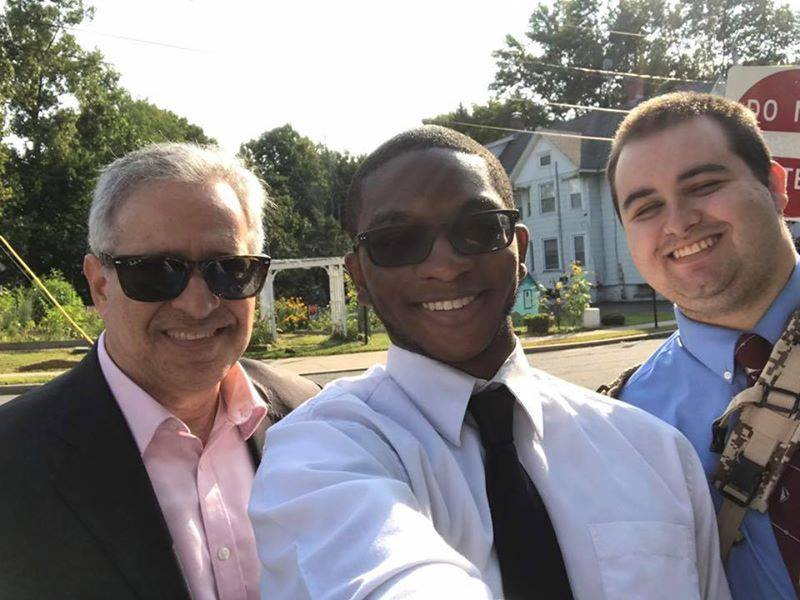
Giuliano, Ford and Moran

== Electoral history ==
Middletown, Connecticut Mayoral Election, 2005
Party	Candidate	Votes	%
Republican	Sebastian Giuliano	6,064	
Democratic	Domenique S. Thornton	5,257	

Middletown, Connecticut Mayoral Election, 2007
Party	Candidate	Votes	%
Republican	Sebastian Giuliano	4,335	62.6

Middletown, Connecticut Mayoral Election, 2009
Party	Candidate	Votes	%
Republican	Sebastian Giuliano	4,388	52.3
Democratic	Dan Drew	3,902	46.5
Realistic Balance	Ruthann Johnson	104	1.2

Middletown, Connecticut Mayoral Election, 2011
Party	Candidate	Votes	%
Democratic	Dan Drew	4,959	52.5
Republican	Sebastian Giuliano (inc.)	4,317	45.7
Unaffiliated	Christine Berry Bourne	172	1.9

Middletown, Connecticut Mayoral Election, 2019
Party	Candidate	Votes	%
Democratic	Benjamin D. Florsheim	5,846	50.17
Republican	Sebastian N. Giuliano	5,428	46.59
Unaffiliated	Valeka Clarke	22	0.19

South Fire District Commissioner Election, 2020
Party	Candidate	Votes	%
Democratic	Daniel Penney	144	41.3
Republican	Sebastian Giuliano	160	45.9
Republican	William S. Wilson	44	12.6
