= Middletown, Connecticut =

Middletown
- City
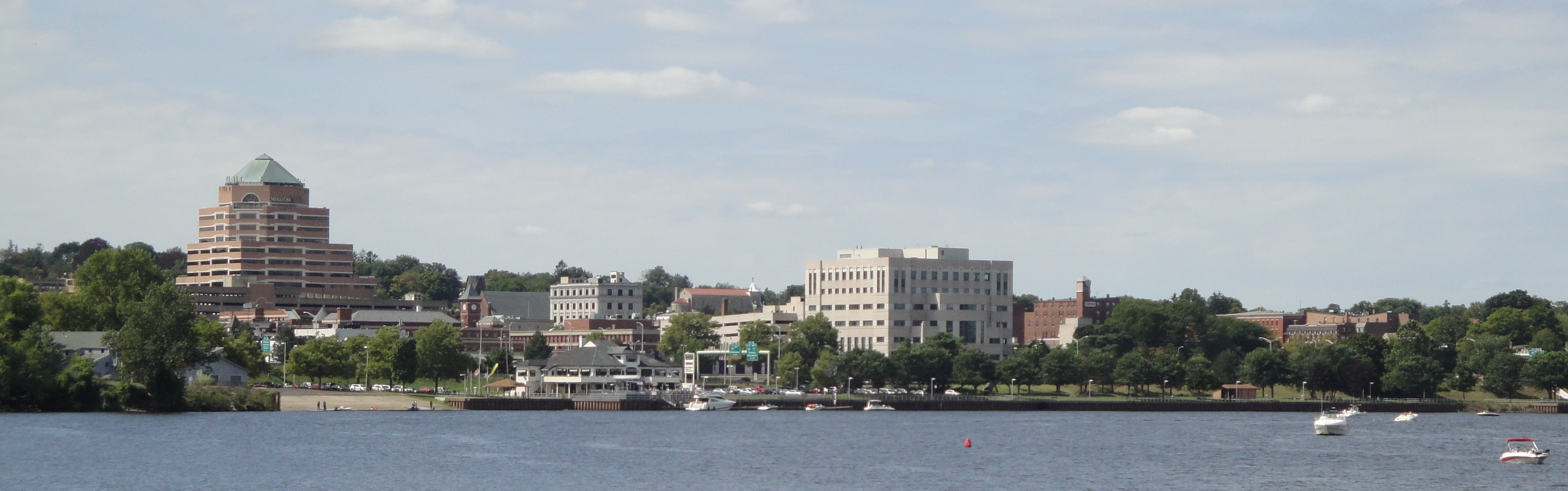
- Middletown skyline

- Flag Seal Logo
- Nickname: Forest City
- Interactive map of Middletown
- Location within Connecticut Location within the United States
- Coordinates: 41°33′44″N 72°39′3″W
- Country: United States
- U.S. state: Connecticut
- County: Middlesex
- Region: Lower CT River Valley
- Incorporated (town): 1651
- Incorporated (city): 1784
- Consolidated: 1923
- Named for: Being halfway between Hartford and Saybrook on the Connecticut River

Government
  - Type: Mayor-council
  - Mayor: Eugene P. Nocera (D)
  - Council President: Jeanette Blackwell (D)

Area
  - Total: 42.36 sq mi (109.72 km^{2})
  - Land: 41.02 sq mi (106.24 km^{2})
  - Water: 1.35 sq mi (3.49 km^{2})
- Elevation: 135 ft (41 m)

Population (2020)
  - Total: 47,717
  - Density: 1,163.3/sq mi (449.14/km^{2})
- Time zone: UTC−05:00 (EST)
  - Summer (DST): UTC−04:00 (EDT)
- ZIP Codes: 06457, 06459
- Area codes: 860/959
- FIPS code: 09-47290
- GNIS feature ID: 02378281
- Website: www.middletownct.gov

Middletown is a city in Middlesex County, Connecticut, United States, located along the Connecticut River, in the central part of the state, 16 miles (25.8 km) south of Hartford. Middletown is the largest city in the Lower Connecticut River Valley Planning Region. In 1650, it was incorporated by English settlers as a town under its original Native American name, Mattabeseck, after the local Wangunk village of the same name. They were among many tribes along the Atlantic coast who spoke Algonquian languages. The colonists renamed the settlement in 1653.

When Hartford County was organized on May 10, 1666, Middletown was included within its boundaries. In 1784, the central settlement was incorporated as a city distinct from the town. Both were included within newly formed Middlesex County in May 1785. In 1923, the City of Middletown was consolidated with the Town, making the city limits extensive.

Originally developed as a sailing port and then an industrial center on the Connecticut River, it is now largely residential. Its downtown, based on Main Street, serves as a popular retail, dining, and bar district near Wesleyan University. Middletown was the county seat of Middlesex County from its creation in 1785 until the elimination of county government in 1960. As of the 2020 census, the city had a total population of 47,717. Middletown, Connecticut, is considered the southernmost city in the Hartford-Springfield Knowledge Corridor Metropolitan Region, which features a combined metro population of 1.9 million. Middletown is largely a politically progressive city, and is home to one of the largest pride events in all of Connecticut.

== History ==
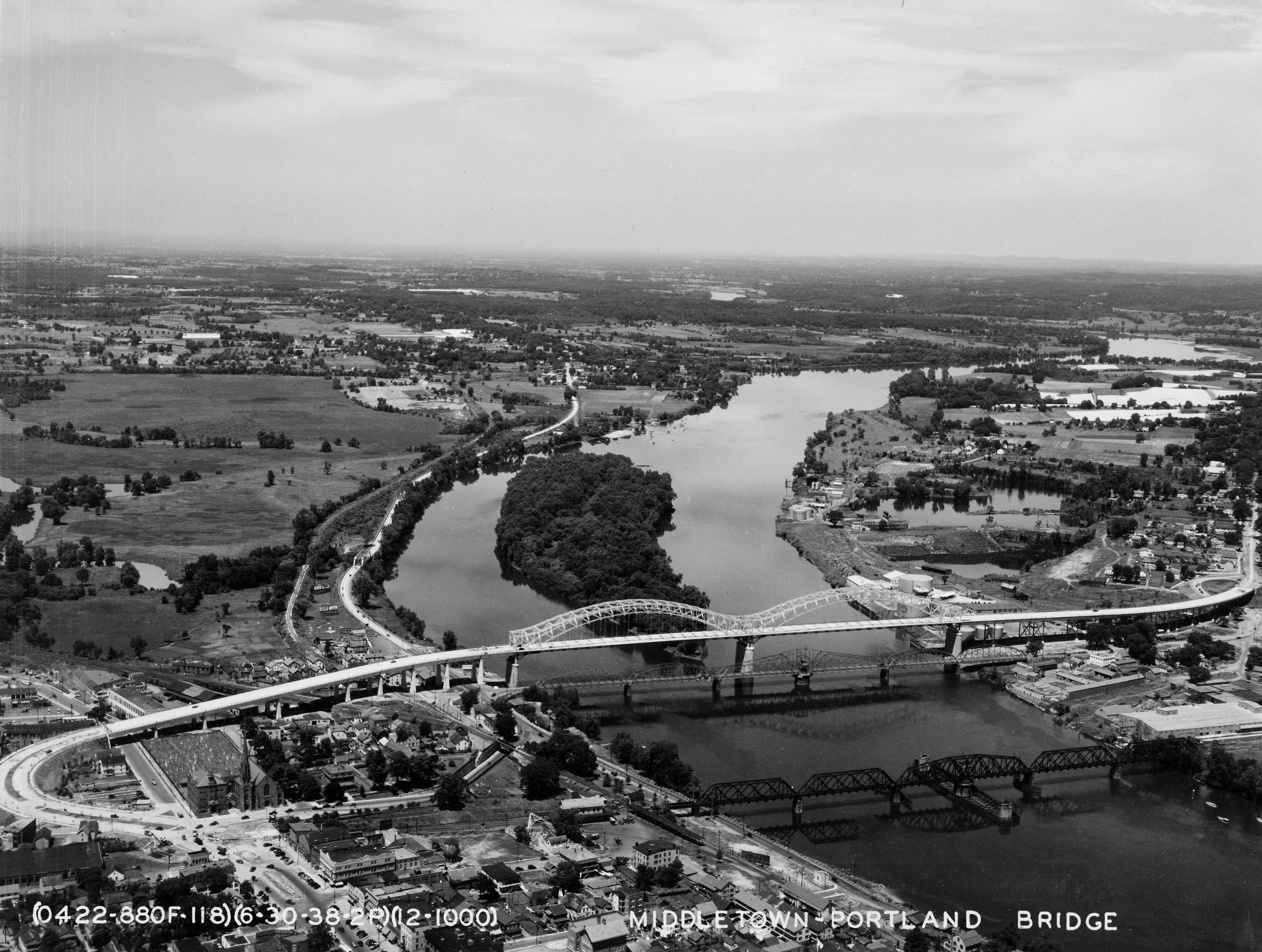
Middletown-Portland Bridge, 1938

The land on the western bank of the Connecticut River where Middletown now lies was home to a village of the Wangunk, a tribe of Algonquian-speaking Native Americans. The village was named Mattabesset (also spelled Mattabesett, Mattabesec, Mattabeseck, and Mattabesek); the area they inhabited—now Middletown and the surrounding area—was named after it. When the primarily English European settlers arrived in the region the Mattabesset were a part of the Wangunk, a large tribe in the Connecticut Valley, at the time under a sachem named Sowheag.

Plans for the colonial settlement were drawn up by the General Court in 1646; the first migrants came from nearby Connecticut colonies in 1650. On September 11, 1651, the General Court of Connecticut established the town of "Mattabesett". A couple of years later in November 1653, the settlement was renamed as Middletown. This name was chosen because the site was approximately halfway between Windsor and Saybrook on the Great River. Life was not easy for these early colonial Puritans; clearing the land and building houses, and tending farms in the rocky soil of New England was a labor-intensive ordeal. They had a strict society; offenses legally punishable by death in the Connecticut colonies included "witchcraft, blasphemy, cursing or smiting of parents, and incorrigible stubbornness of children."

The Pequot and Mohegan tribes, at that time traditional allies of the English colonists and enemies of the Wangunk, arrived in the Middletown area in the latter half of the 17th century; conflict between them and local Native American tribes ensued. The inhabitants of Mattabesett and others referred to the Mohegan as "destroyers of men." Sowheag hoped that the colonists would intervene. They did not. Smallpox epidemics caused high mortality, reducing their ability to resist and disrupting their cohesion as a tribe. Records show that, over time, Sowheag was forced to sell off most of Mattabesett to the local colonists; by 1676 the Puritans owned all but 300 acres (1.2 km^{2}) of the former territory. Native Americans suffered similar fates of illness and dispossession at other colonial sites in 17th-century New England.

During the 18th century, Middletown became the largest and most prosperous settlement in Connecticut. By the time of the American Revolution, Middletown was a thriving port, where one-third of its residents were involved in merchant and maritime activities. Some settlers held enslaved Africans as workers in the early economy of Middletown; they worked as domestic servants, laborers, and in shipping. African slaves were imported by the English in 1661 from Barbados in the Caribbean. By 1756 Middletown had the third-largest African slave population in the state of Connecticut—218 slaves to 5,446 whites.

Middletown merchant traders pushed for the clearance of the Saybrook Bar at the mouth of the Connecticut River, and later sought the creation of Middlesex County in 1785. The name 'Middlesex' was chosen because the intention was to make Middletown the head of a long river port, much as London was at the head of its long river port on the Thames in Middlesex County, England. The same persons also established the Middlesex Turnpike (now Route 154) to link all the settlements on the western side of the Connecticut, again with the intent of creating one long port.

After the American Revolution, Connecticut and most northern states abolished slavery. The port's decline began in the early 19th century during the period of strained American-British relations and resulting trade restrictions, which led to the War of 1812. The port never recovered from the restrictions of the war. The city's men distinguished themselves in the war effort, as Middletown's Commodore Thomas Macdonough led American forces to the victory on Lake Champlain in 1814 which ended British hopes for an invasion of New York. After the war, migration of New England families continued west to New York and, later, to the Midwest around the Great Lakes, where more land was available.

In the 19th century, Middletown became a major center for firearms manufacturing. Numerous gun manufacturers in the area supplied the majority of pistols to the United States government during the War of 1812. After that war, however, the center of this business shifted to Springfield, Massachusetts; and Hartford, and New Haven, Connecticut. (See also History of Connecticut industry.)

In 1831 Wesleyan University was established. It became one of the United States' leading liberal arts universities. The college replaced an earlier educational institution on the same site, Partridge's American Literary, Scientific and Military Academy. It had moved to Norwich, Vermont and later developed as Norwich University.

The two main buildings of the original campus were built by the people of Middletown in order to attract an academic institution to the city. In 1841, Middletown established the state's first public high school, which at first enrolled all students from age nine through age sixteen who had previously attended district schools.

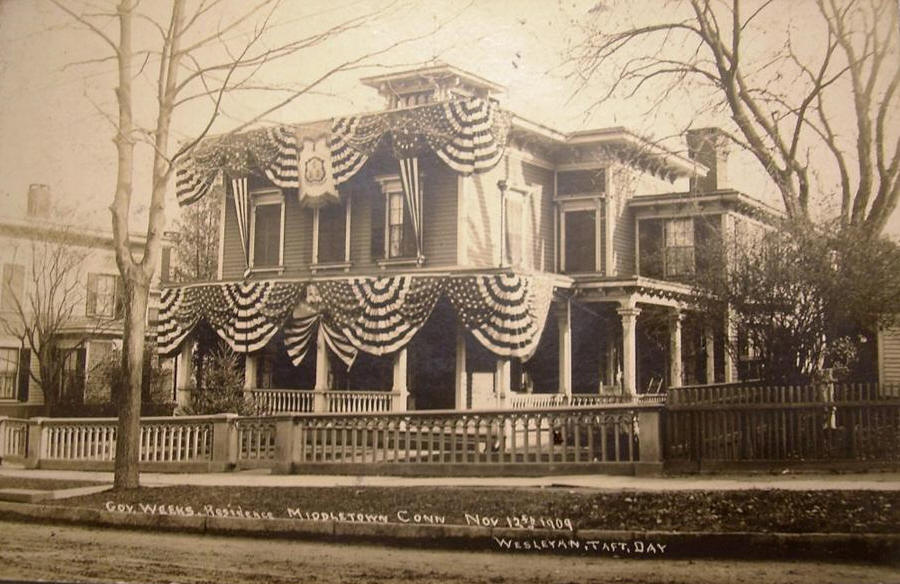
Home of Governor Frank Weeks, decorated for "Wesleyan Taft Day", 1909

During the mid-19th century, manufacturing replaced trade as Middletown's economic mainstay. But industrial growth was limited after railroad operators bypassed Middletown in their construction of a railway between Hartford and New Haven. There had been an ambitious plan to build a railroad suspension bridge from White Rock in Middletown to Bodkin Rock in Portland vicinity, which was seen as an unpractical solution.

Middletownians played an active role in the American Civil War. General Joseph K. Mansfield was a Union general at the Battle of Antietam, where he died in action in 1862. Another casualty at Antietam was Brigadier General George Taylor, who had been educated at a private military academy in Middletown. The popular Civil War marching song "Marching Through Georgia" was written by Henry Clay Work, a Middletown resident. Some residents were active in the abolitionism movement, and the city was a hub along the Underground Railroad.

The Connecticut General Hospital for the Insane was opened in Middletown in 1868. It was the first public mental healthcare facility in Connecticut, which up until that time was in a minority of states which did not support public insane asylums. By 1896, four groups of buildings had been erected on Connecticut General Hospital for the Insane's site in the South Farm district, and the institution was one of the largest of its kind in the country. It is associated with Connecticut Valley Hospital Cemetery. As of 2025, the institution has been renamed Connecticut Valley Hospital, and administers psychiatric care through the Department of Mental Health and Addiction Services. It remains one of Middletown's top employers.

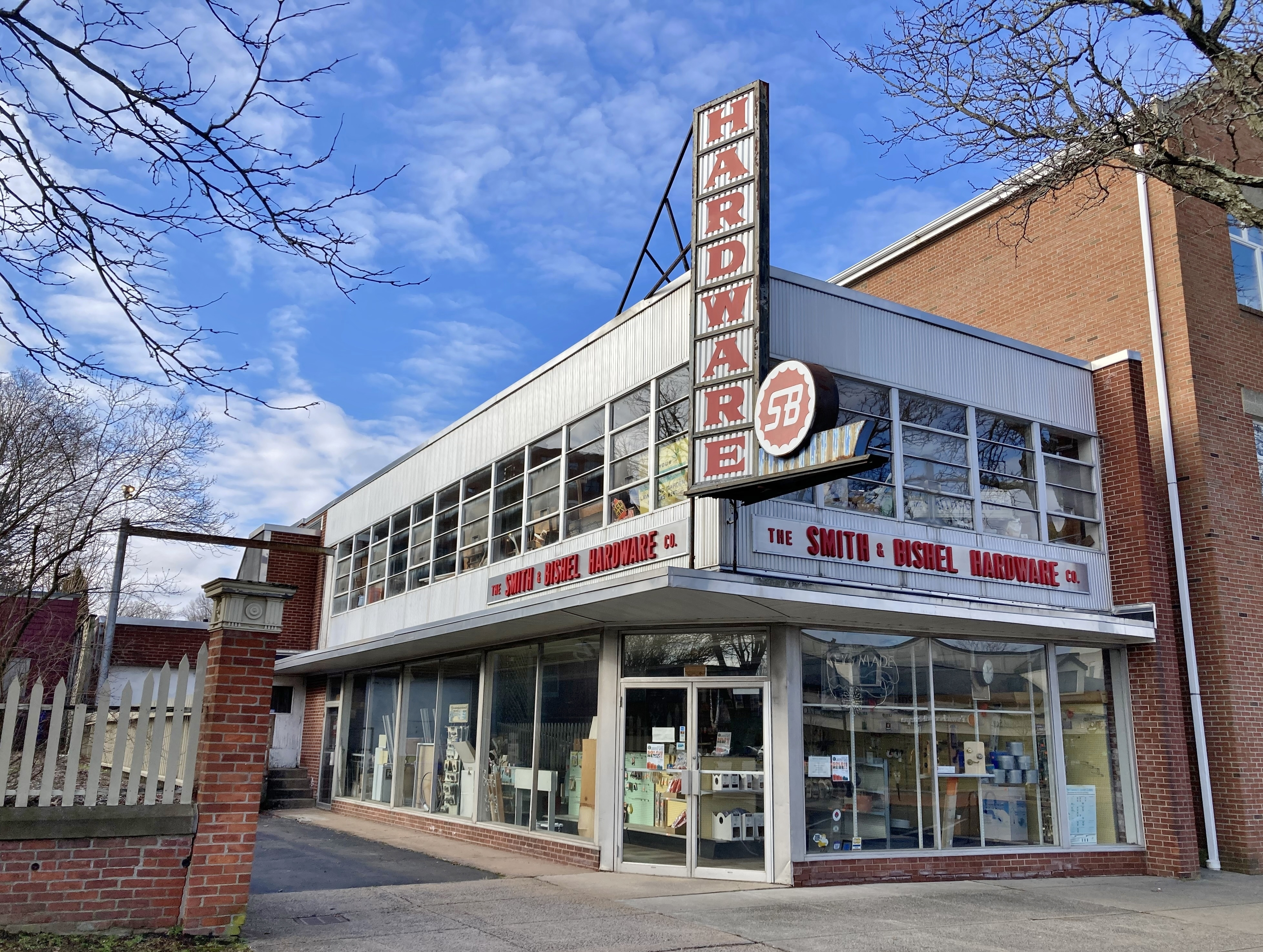
Smith & Bishel Hardware on Main Street, founded in 1898

In the latter half of the 19th century, manufacturing was the mainstay of the city's economy, especially finely made metal parts, such as marine hardware (Wilcox, Crittendon & Co.) and typewriters (Royal Typewriters). There were also several machine tool and die manufacturers in the city. Middletown was the site of a major unit of Goodyear. In addition, there was the pioneer automobile manufacturer Eisenhuth Horseless Vehicle Company. Other manufacturers included in national expositions and now museum collections include the Middletown Plate Company (silver), Middletown Silver Co. and I. E. Palmer (hammocks).

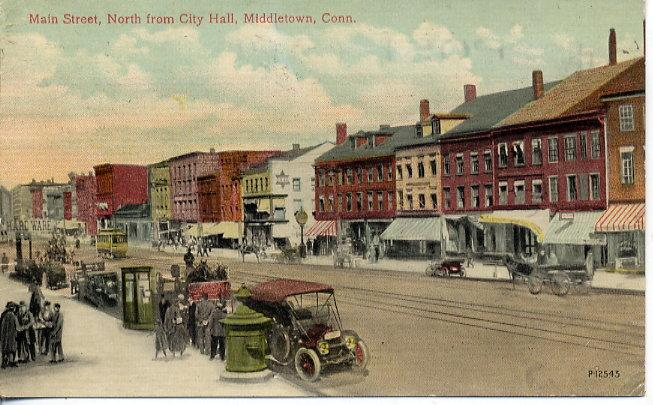
Main Street, looking north from City Hall, about 1912

Middletown also briefly was the home of a major-league baseball team, the Middletown Mansfields of the National Association.

In the late 19th and early 20th century, the city underwent a demographic transformation, after having been settled primarily by Protestant people from the British Isles. First the Irish, in response to the Great Famine, and then large numbers of Italian immigrants arrived to work in Middletown's factories and farms. Many of the Italians were immigrants from Melilli, Sicily. Both groups were primarily Roman Catholic.

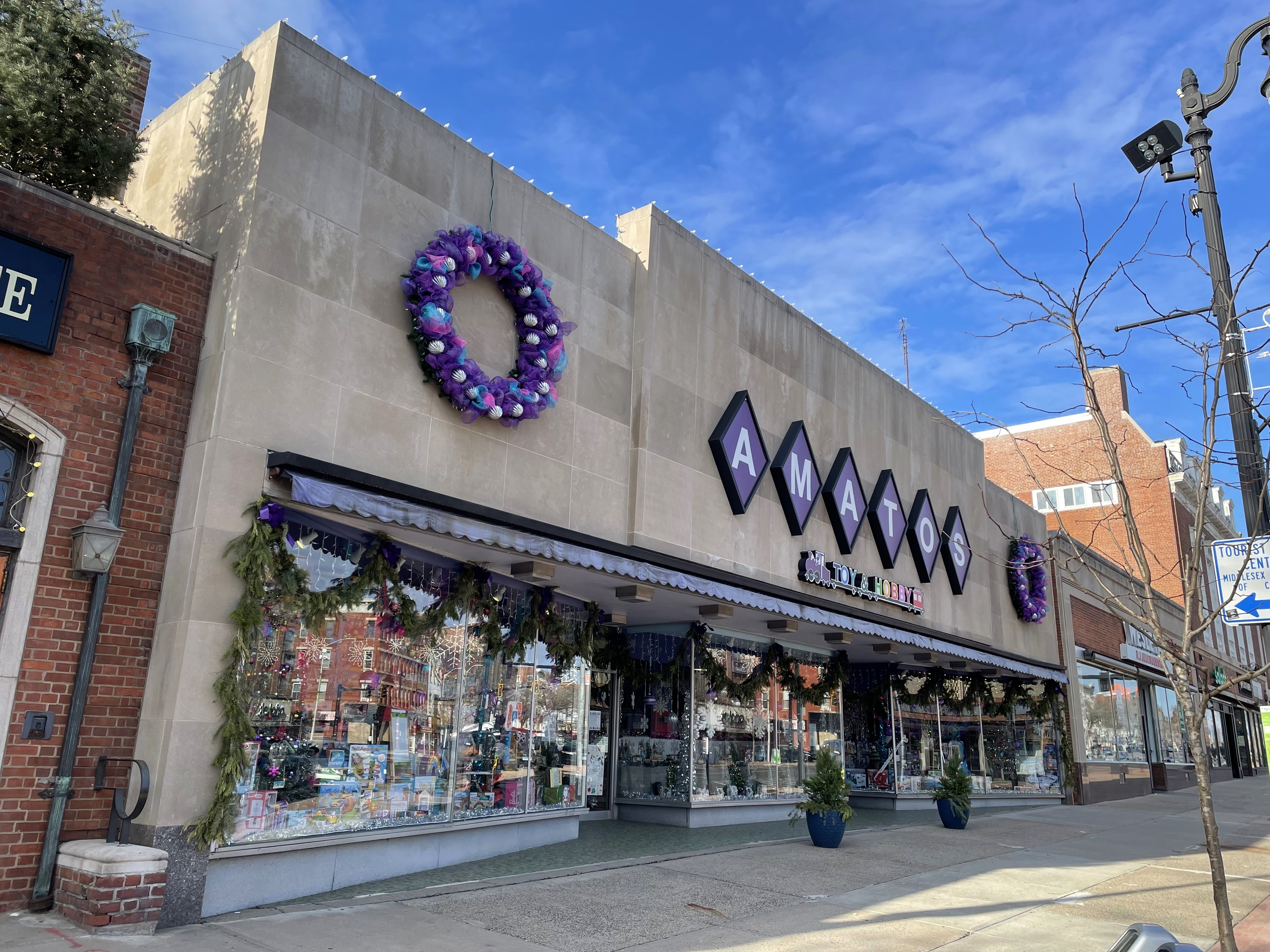
Amato's Toy and Hobby Store on Main Street, founded in 1940

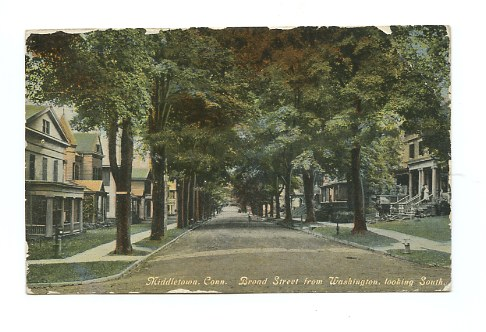
Looking South on Broad Street from Washington Street, 1910 postcard

Polish and German arrivals followed, and many of these immigrants were also Catholic. By 1910 the population had swelled to nearly 21,000. Meanwhile, the number of African Americans dwindled to 53 persons. Employers chose to hire white immigrants. Later in the century, more African Americans from the South migrated to the area for its industrial jobs and better social conditions. They were part of the Great Migration during the 20th century, up to 1970.

In the early 1980s, two Wesleyan professors arranged to bring a small group of Cambodian refugees to Middletown, who were exiled following the US involvement in Southeast Asia in the Vietnam War. They developed a thriving Cambodian community, as have later migrants from Tibet. Middletown also attracted Hindu immigrants from India and other parts of Southeast Asia, who established the first Hindu temple in Connecticut in Middletown.

Over the decades the new immigrants stimulated the rise of a range of cuisines offered by restaurants. This has become one of the most well-known aspects of the city.

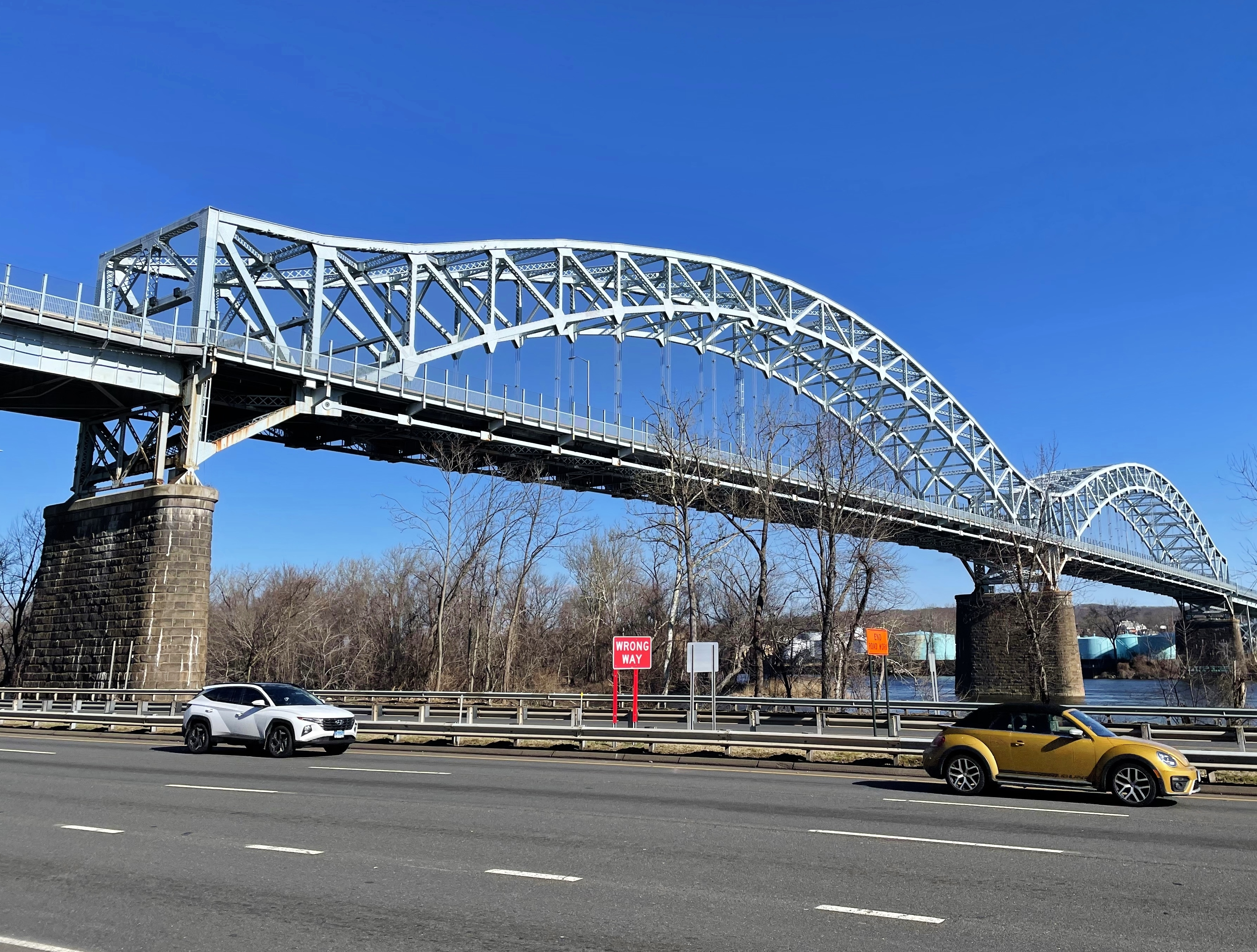
Arrigoni Bridge

Middletown was hit by floods in 1927 and 1936, and by The Great New England Hurricane in 1938. The Arrigoni Bridge was completed over the Connecticut River in 1938. It replaced an earlier bridge to connect Middletown to Portland and points east.

During the 1950s, as the prevalence of the automobile increased, government officials approved the construction of a highway that effectively separated Middletown from the Connecticut River, which had long supported its development. Highway construction demolished historic neighborhoods, including many buildings from the 18th century. New suburban developments were built outside older neighborhoods, attracting the people with money to buy new. In the mid-20th century, Middletown and similar towns lost heavy industry and manufacturing jobs that moved offshore, resulting in a general decline in population. An alternate economy began to develop by the 1990s.

During this period, the city tore down many older buildings in the name of 'urban renewal', but sometimes new development was delayed for years. Downtown area had large flat parking lots, or buildings were abandoned and left empty. With high unemployment and limited opportunities, and increasing problems with drugs, crime increased. During the 1960s, Pratt & Whitney opened a large aircraft engine plant in the Maromas section of Middletown. Concurrently, developers bought much of the city's remaining farms, including most of Oak Grove Dairy, to redevelop as residential suburbs for local workers and commuters to surrounding cities.

During the 1970s, Oddfellows Playhouse was established. The theater attracts hundreds of young people every year from around the state to perform in plays and other performances. The playhouse is one of the few youth theaters in the state of Connecticut. It is located on 128 Washington Street, around the corner from Middletown's Main Street.

During the 1990s, a partnership between the city, the Middlesex Chamber of Commerce, and Wesleyan University invested substantially in Middletown's Main Street, improving urban design and supporting new businesses. Their actions helped the revival of downtown Middletown. Crime decreased, and new restaurants and shops opened.

=== 21st century ===
In recent decades, Middletown has focused on balancing the needs and comforts of its residents with the commercial development required to help fund services. These efforts date at least from 1931, when the city was one of the first in America to establish a planning board. Progress continued under the leadership of Democratic mayor, Domenique S. Thornton, who served a record eight years (four terms) as mayor. The city attracted a 12-screen movie theater and numerous restaurants and other businesses to the downtown area, the city provided free Wi-Fi service along Main Street and the historic Inn at Middletown a luxury four and half star boutique hotel transformed the former vacant National Guard Armory. On November 8, 2005, Republican Sebastian Giuliano won the mayor's office, replacing Thornton, whom he criticized for raising taxes and for the awarding of a contract for the construction of a new high school to Tomasso Brothers, Inc., a firm that had been the target of a federal corruption probe. During Giuliano's three terms in office, Middletown's Main Street became a hub for small businesses, and the city began investing heavily in the arts. Democrat Daniel T. Drew defeated Giuliano in 2011. Drew has pushed for increased development in the city's North End, an area that has been plagued by poverty and crime in recent decades. In November 2012, voters approved a $37 (~$49.8 million in 2024) Million initiative to move Middletown's wastewater to the Mattabassett Sewer District treatment plant in nearby Cromwell. Previously, the city had operated its own sewage treatment plant on the banks of the Connecticut River. The city has made plans to tear down this older plant and develop the riverfront property on which it sits. Middletown continues to support manufacturing and small business.

Middletown has remained an important government administrative center. From the creation of Middlesex County in 1798 until the elimination of county government in 1965 Middletown was the county seat. Middletown today retains Middlesex Superior Court, and the Judicial District remains that of the former county court. Other county functions were either centralized to the state or transferred to the towns. The former county building has been removed, but there are other state agency buildings elsewhere in the city, such as the Dept. of Social Services on Main Street Ext. Middletown's Probate Court district includes the towns of Cromwell, Portland, Middlefield and Haddam. The city is also the site of the controversial State Juvenile Training Center.

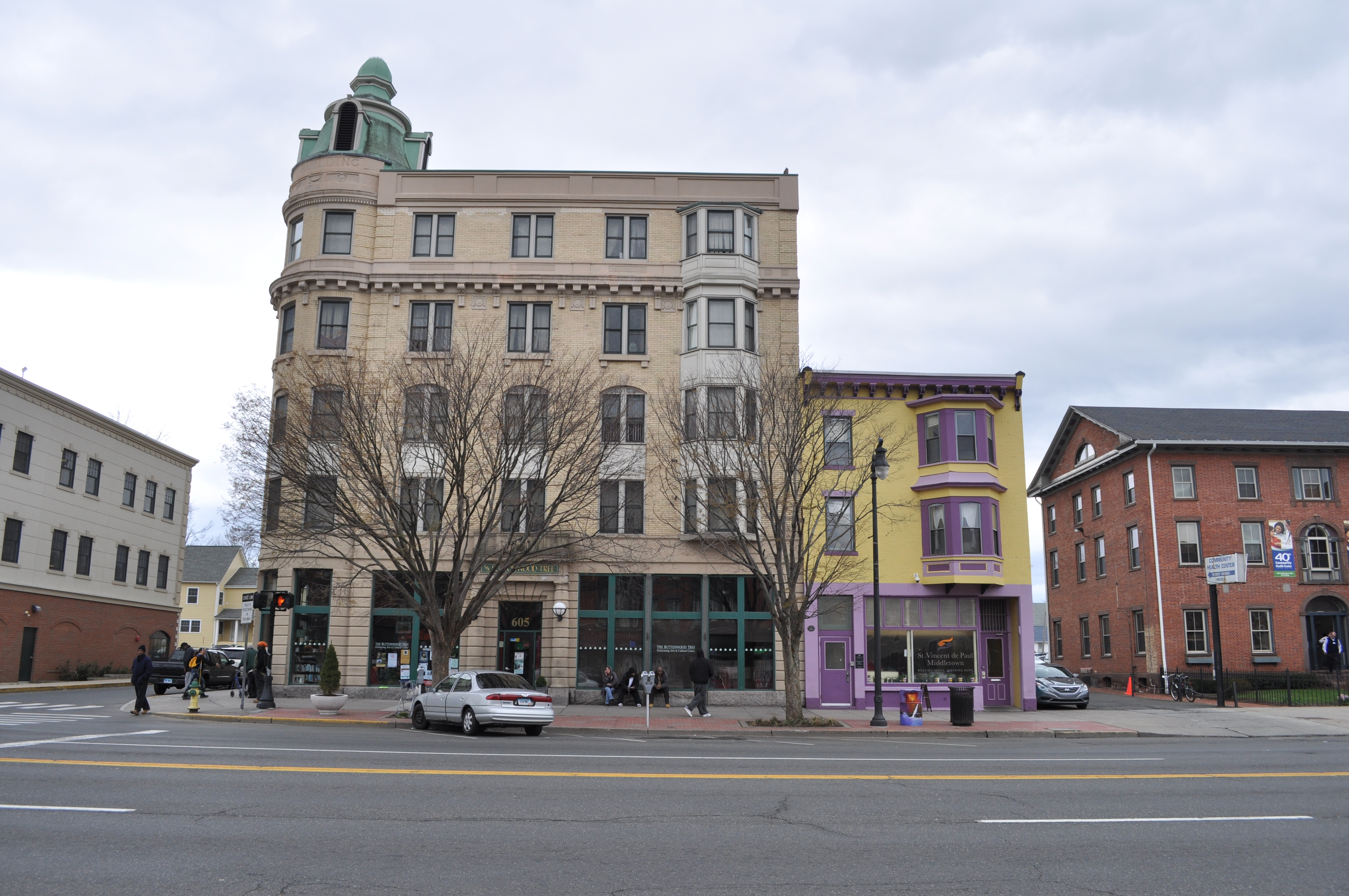
Arrigoni Building (former Arrigoni Hotel, now low-income housing) and others in Middletown's North End

Culturally and politically, Middletown is in the midst of an effort to revitalize its historically disadvantaged North End. Economic development projects recently completed in the North End include Wharfside Commons, a 96-unit mixed income apartment block, and the new Community Health Center (completed in 2012 at the corner of Main and Grand Streets). The Green Street Arts Center, founded by Wesleyan and a coalition of community groups in 2000, is a pioneering attempt to attract residents and businesses to the neighborhood by promoting arts education and outreach. For decades, the famous O'Rourke's Diner has done much to bring some stability to the North End. A fire on August 31, 2006, gutted much of the historic structure. The Middletown community held many fundraising events to raise money for the diner's rebuilding. Reconstruction began in September 2007, and O'Rourke's Diner re-opened in February 2008. Mayor Daniel Drew (2011–2019) supported citizen-oriented efforts to revitalize the North End, such as the local nonprofit NEAT (North End Action Team). In 2012, the City of Middletown and NEAT partnered to form the "I Heart the North End" initiative, which plans to raise public awareness of the economic and cultural opportunities available in the area.

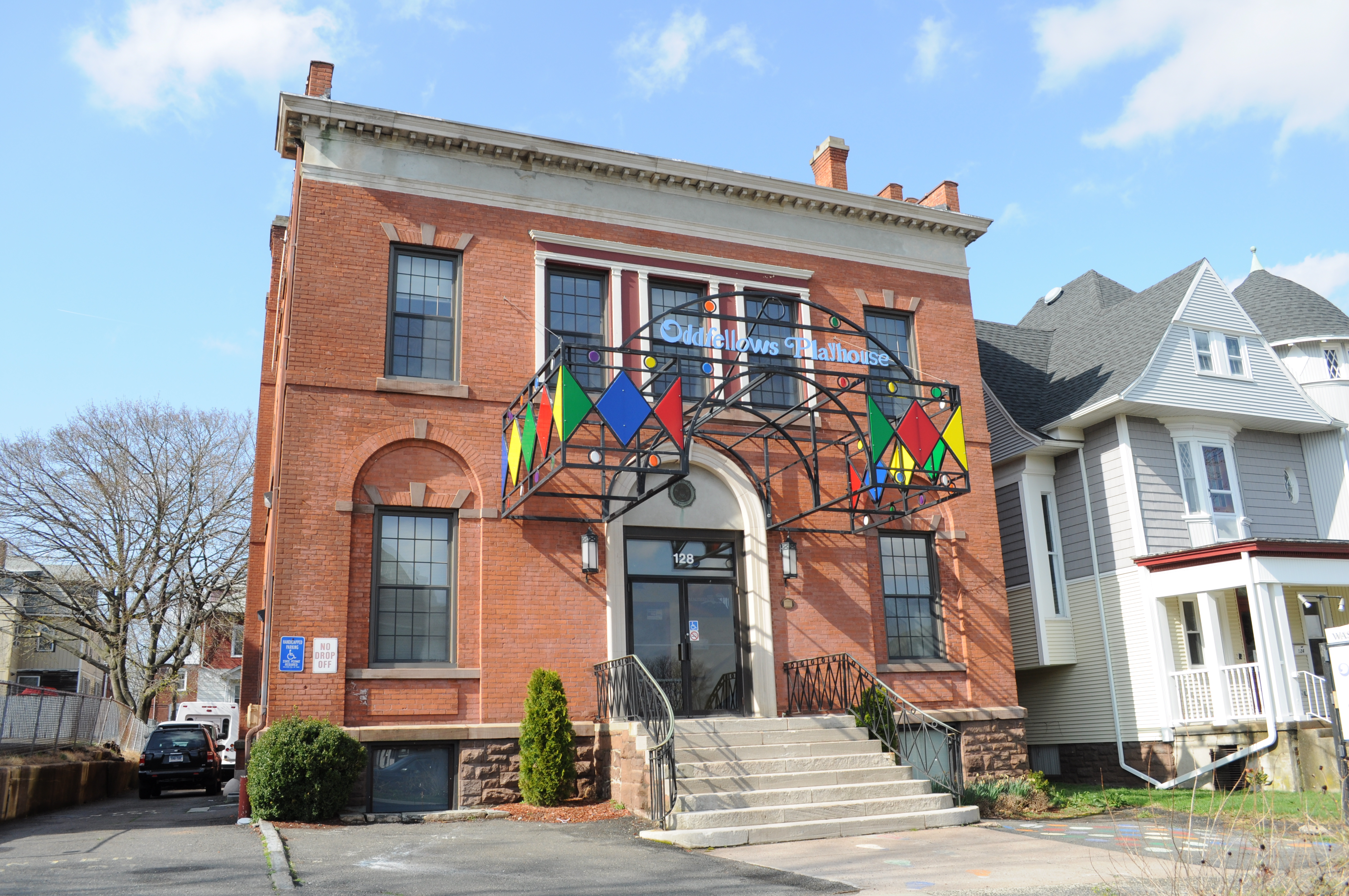
Oddfellows Playhouse

Middletown is the only location of a well-known youth theater group, Oddfellows Playhouse, which is located on Washington Street and invites children of all ages from all over the state to learn theater skills. Oddfellows also runs the Children's Circus of Middletown where children learn circus skills and put on a show for close to a thousand people.

Middletown is also host to the Kidcity Children's Museum located in a renovated and recently expanded former home of Judge Elmer, which was moved 400 feet (120 m) down Washington Street to its current location. Kidcity is a hands-on playspace where children ages 1 through 8 come with parents and other significant adults to learn through play. The Downtown Business District continues to revitalize the downtown area. Pratt and Whitney, Aetna, Middlesex Hospital, Connecticut Valley Hospital, Liberty Bank, and Wesleyan University are major employers. Located on the western border of the city, in an area known as Westlake, is an 84 house community known as The Farms. This architectural award-winning community was developed in 1969 by George Achenbach, and was one of the first communities in Connecticut designed for cluster living, with open areas designated as common land.

There are also many parks and nature trails including the Middletown Nature Gardens, Wadsworth Falls State Park and Smith Park, and 100 acres (0.40 km^{2}) of open property at the Guida Farm Conservation Area for families to enjoy. Harbor Park is a 2.6-acre (11,000 m^{2}) recreation area on the Connecticut River, featuring a boardwalk, restaurant/nightclub, fishing, seasonal boat excursions, and the Middletown High School and Wesleyan University crew boathouses. July 4 festivities, as well as the head of the Connecticut Regatta event in October are conducted from Harbor Park.

Middlesex Hospital a major employer in Middletown and throughout Middlesex County, is spending $31 million to build a new emergency department. The new emergency department opened on March 24, 2008. Along with the new department, a helipad will be added along with 70 new parking spaces for patients.

At 11:17 a.m. on February 7, 2010, a large explosion occurred at a power plant under construction in Middletown.

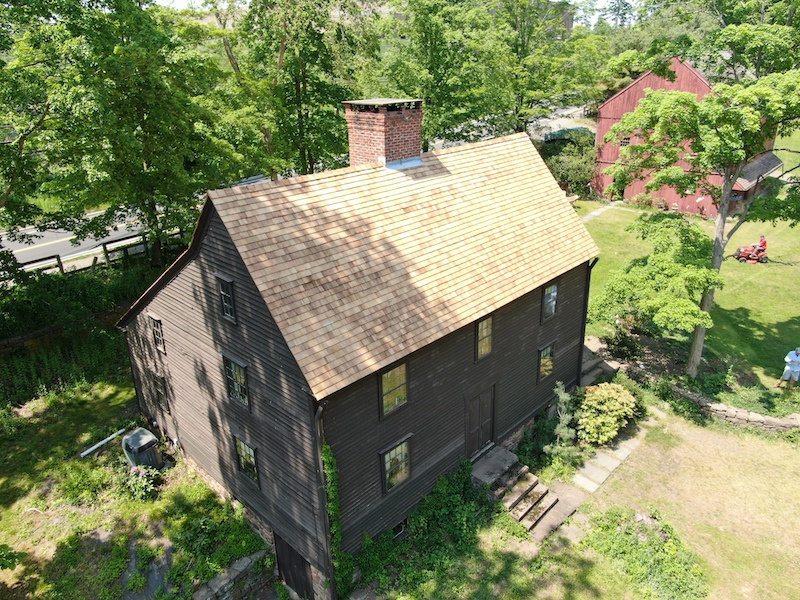
Samuel Harris House, at 612 Middle St., well outside downtown

There are numerous houses, buildings and historic districts in Middletown listed on the National Register of Historic Places, and two are further designated as National Historic Landmarks. The Samuel Wadsworth Russell House on High Street, built in 1827, was declared a National Historic Landmark in 2001. The Alsop House, also located on High Street, and built in 1840, was designated a National Historic Landmark in 2009. Both buildings are part of the Wesleyan campus.

The saltbox Samuel Harris House, built in 1686 and not listed on the National Register, may be the oldest surviving house in Middletown.

== Geography ==
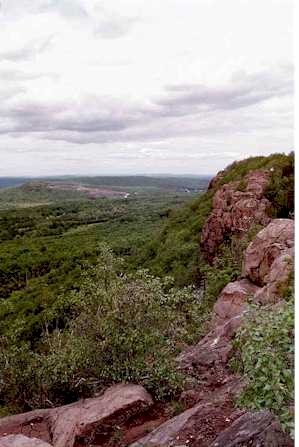
Higby Mountain

Middletown sits on the west bank of the Connecticut River, in the south-central portion of the state. Running alongside the river, Route 9 bisects the city. According to the United States Census Bureau, the city has a total area of 42.3 square miles (109.6 km^{2}), of which 40.9 square miles (105.9 km^{2}) is land and 1.4 square miles (3.7 km^{2}) is water. The total area is 3.36% water. Middletown shares borders with the neighboring towns of Cromwell, Portland, East Hampton, Haddam, Durham, Middlefield, Berlin, and Meriden. Of all the neighboring towns, Portland and East Hampton are the only ones that do not have any land boundaries, as they are located on the eastern side of the Connecticut River.

The west side of Middletown is flanked by the Metacomet Ridge—a mountainous trap rock ridgeline that stretches from Long Island Sound to nearly the Vermont border. Notable mountains of the Metacomet Ridge in Middletown include Higby Mountain and the north side of Lamentation Mountain. The 50-mile (80 km) Mattabesett Trail traverses the ridge. The Nature Conservancy manages the summit and ledges of Higby Mountain. Major bodies of water include the Connecticut River along the towns eastern boundary, the Mattabesset River along its northern boundary, Crystal Lake in the southern end of town, and Pameacha Pond along South Main Street. The Mount Higby and Adder reservoirs also fall along its western boundary with Middlefield.

=== Principal communities ===
- Highland – The westernmost neighborhood of Middletown. It is the only section of the city that Interstate 91 passes through within its total distance through Middletown.

- Westfield – Formerly a village, now a mostly residential neighborhood located in the northwestern corner of the city, lying just south of the border with Cromwell.
- Miramichi – A mostly residential neighborhood located in the southwest corner of the city, lying just north of the border with Middlefield.
- Newfield Heights – A commercial neighborhood with many businesses and restaurants located to the north of the city center.
- Bretton Heights – A mostly residential neighborhood located a few miles west of the city center.
- Lakeridge Heights – A semi-industrial neighborhood located just below the South Farms area, and just above the Durham town line.
- South Farms – A mostly residential area lying just to the south of the city center.
- Maromas – A largely industrial and mostly uninhabited neighborhood, located in the southeastern part of the city. Pratt & Whitney has one of its offices located in this area.

== Demographics ==
Historical population
Census	Pop.	Note	%±
1810	2,014		—
1820	2,618		30.0%
1830	3,123		19.3%
1840	3,511		12.4%
1850	4,211		19.9%
1860	5,182		23.1%
1870	6,923		33.6%
1880	6,826		−1.4%
1890	9,013		32.0%
1900	9,589		6.4%
1910	11,851		23.6%
1920	13,638		15.1%
1930	24,554		80.0%
1940	26,495		7.9%
1950	29,711		12.1%
1960	33,250		11.9%
1970	36,924		11.0%
1980	39,040		5.7%
1990	42,762		9.5%
2000	43,167		0.9%
2010	47,648		10.4%
2020	47,717		0.1%
U.S. Decennial Census

=== 2020 census ===
As of the 2020 census, Middletown had a population of 47,717. The median age was 38.2 years. 16.0% of residents were under the age of 18 and 16.5% of residents were 65 years of age or older. For every 100 females there were 92.4 males, and for every 100 females age 18 and over there were 90.4 males age 18 and over.

94.8% of residents lived in urban areas, while 5.2% lived in rural areas.

There were 20,081 households in Middletown, of which 22.6% had children under the age of 18 living in them. Of all households, 35.3% were married-couple households, 22.7% were households with a male householder and no spouse or partner present, and 32.8% were households with a female householder and no spouse or partner present. About 37.1% of all households were made up of individuals and 12.1% had someone living alone who was 65 years of age or older. The average household size was 2.14.

There were 21,671 housing units, of which 7.3% were vacant. The homeowner vacancy rate was 1.2% and the rental vacancy rate was 7.0%. Owner-occupied housing made up 54% of the units.

Racial composition as of the 2020 census
Race	Number	Percent
White	31,585	66.2%
Black or African American	6,739	14.1%
American Indian and Alaska Native	169	0.4%
Asian	2,634	5.5%
Native Hawaiian and Other Pacific Islander	14	0.0%
Some other race	2,029	4.3%
Two or more races	4,547	9.5%
Hispanic or Latino (of any race)	5,637	11.8%

=== Income ===
The median income for a household in the city was $62,022. Males had a median income of $49,846 versus $37,412 for females. The per capita income for the city was $39,845. 12.3% of the population was below the poverty line.

== Government ==
Voter Registration and Party Enrollment as of October 31, 2024
Party	Active Voters	Inactive Voters	Total Voters	Percentage
Democratic	12,313	2,386	14,699	43.2%
Republican	4,694	616	5,310	16.5%
Minor parties	468	116	584	1.6%
Unaffiliated	11,001	2,549	13,550	38.7%
Total	28,476	5,667	34,143	100%

== Infrastructure ==
The headquarters of the Connecticut Department of Emergency Services and Public Protection, previously the Connecticut Department of Public Safety,[24][25][26] is located in Middletown.[27]

The United States Postal Service operates the Middletown Post Office.[28]

== Economy ==
=== Top employers ===
Top employers in Middletown according to the town's 2023 Comprehensive Annual Financial Report

#	Employer	# of Employees
1	Middlesex Health Systems	3,126
2	Pratt & Whitney/RTX Corporation	2,350
3	FedEx	1,561
4	Connecticut Valley Hospital	1,669
5	Middletown Board of Education	1,237
6	Wesleyan University	1,050
7	Liberty Bank	497
8	City of Middletown	492
9	Jarvis Products Corporation	279
10	Kaman Corporation	218

== Education ==
Middletown operates public schools, including Middletown High School.

The city has one Roman Catholic elementary school, Saint John Paul II Regional Catholic School, and two Roman Catholic high schools, Xavier High School (for boys) and Mercy High School (for girls).

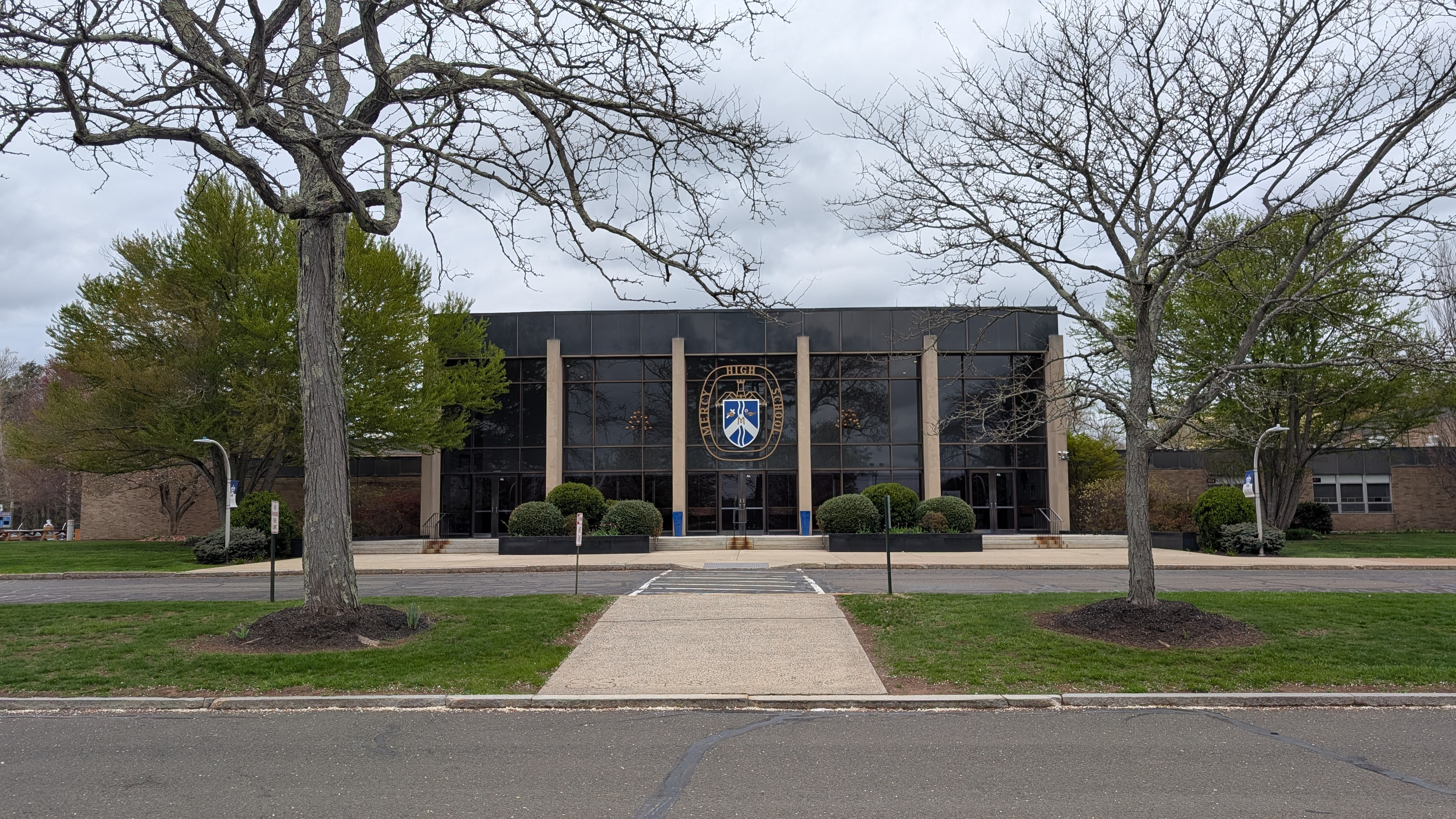
Front of Mercy High School

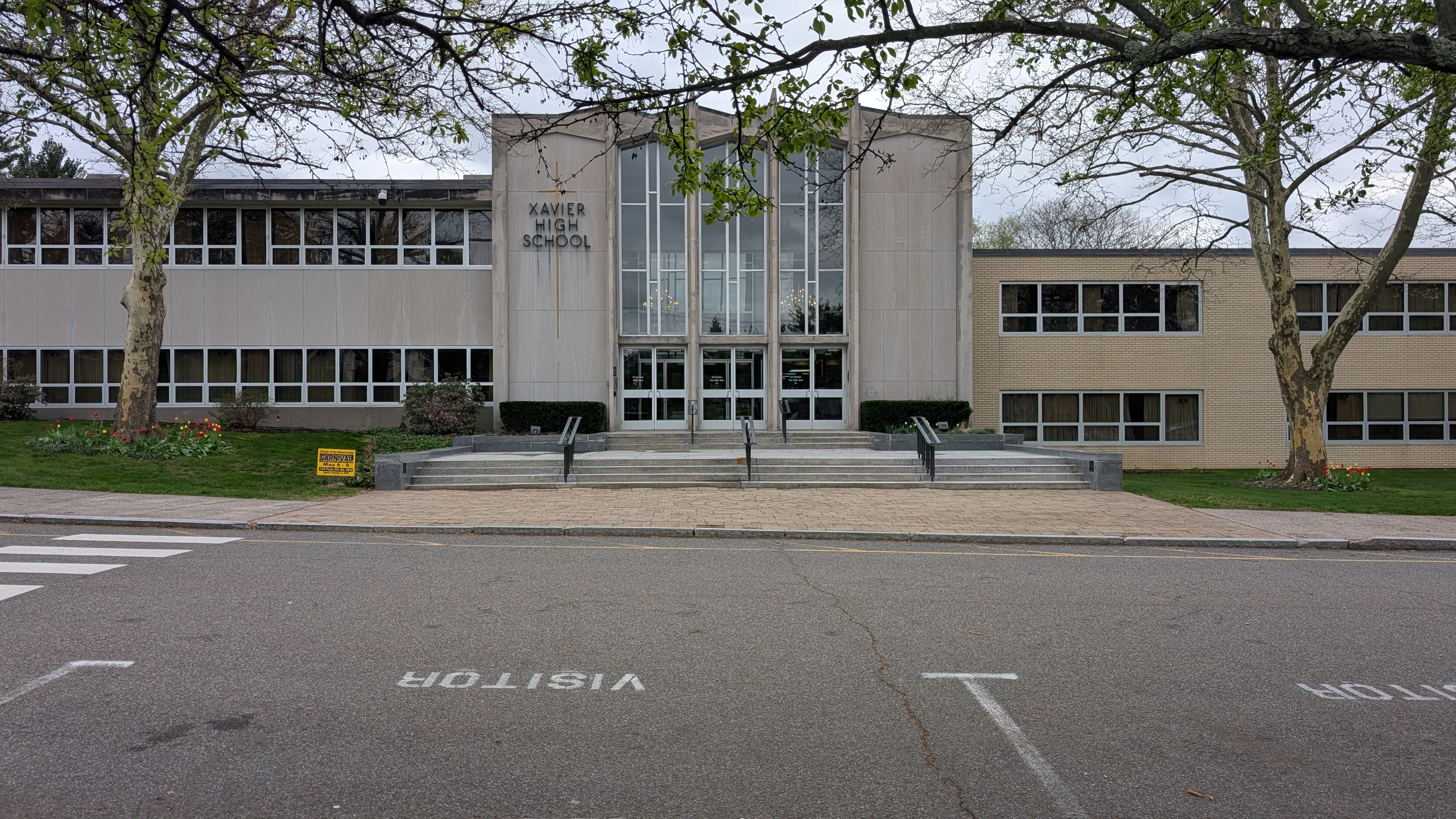
Front of Xavier High School

Middletown also has one technical high school, Vinal Technical High School.

Post-secondary institutions include Wesleyan University and Middlesex Community College.

Russell Library is the public library of Middletown. It provides books, periodicals, full-text databases, classes, computer training, workshops, concerts, and meeting spaces.

== Media ==
Middletown has three regular news outlets. The Middletown Press is a daily broadsheet that covers news in the Middletown area. The Hartford Courant is a daily broadsheet which includes a Middletown story in every issue. Three radio stations are licensed to Middletown: WMRD 1150 AM (variety), WESU 88.1 FM (Wesleyan University), and WIHS 104.9 FM (religious).

== Transportation ==
River Valley Transit provides public transportation services throughout Middletown as well as service between Middletown and Old Saybrook, which, along with New Haven, provides connections to Amtrak intercity trains and Shore Line East commuter rail service. The New Britain Transportation Company provides connecting service to New Britain and the surrounding area; and Connecticut Transit provides local and express service to Hartford as well as express service to New Haven.

Bradley International Airport (BDL) in Windsor Locks and Tweed New Haven Airport (HVN) in East Haven are the closest commercial airports to Middletown. Meriden Markham Municipal Airport, in Meriden, and Goodspeed Airport, in East Haddam, each offer general aviation services as well and are open to the public.

== In popular culture ==
Middletown's riverfront and bridges were featured extensively in the music video for Billy Joel's hit song "The River of Dreams". TLC's reality series 90 Day Fiancé documented Darcey Silva's relationships. On June 29, 2020, Entertainment Weekly announced that Silva and her sister Stacey are getting their own reality show called Darcey & Stacey. Three seasons of Darcey & Stacey have been filmed in Middletown.

== Notable organizations ==
- Artists For World Peace, Nonprofit International Peace Organization

== Notable people ==
This notable people list is divided into three sections: people born in Middletown, people who currently live in Middletown, and people who once lived in Middletown at some point in their lives.

The following notable people were born in Middletown:

- Dean Acheson (1893–1971), 51st United States Secretary of State
- Charles Richard Alsop, lawyer, politician and Mayor of Middletown
- Joseph Wright Alsop IV, politician and insurance executive; father of Joseph Alsop
- Jules Dassin, film director
- Reginald De Koven, music critic and composer
- Bill Denehy, Major League Baseball (MLB) pitcher
- Samantha Johnson, soccer player
- Joey Logano, NASCAR driver, 2018, 2022, and 2024 NASCAR Cup Series champion
- Mark MacDonald, member of the Vermont House of Representatives and Vermont Senate
- Samuel Mattocks, officer in the American Revolution and Vermont State Treasurer
- Peter Parcek, blues rock guitarist, singer, and songwriter
- Tony Pastor, band leader, singer
- Eli Pemberton (born 1997), basketball player in the Israeli Basketball Premier League
- Willie Pep, boxer, two-time World Featherweight Champion
- Marco Rafalà, Novelist and Game Writer
- William Ranney, 19th century Western artist
- James Riley, captain of the United States merchant ship Commerce
- Adelaïde Alsop Robineau, American potter
- Maurice Rose, U.S. Army Major General, highest-ranking American killed by enemy fire in Europe during World War II
- Jordan Russolillo, professional soccer player
- Bill Rutan, racing driver
- Bozoma Saint John, cast member on The Real Housewives of Beverly Hills and former CMO of Netflix
- Darcey Silva, television personality, former beauty queen and businesswoman
- Amari Spievey, professional football player for the Detroit Lions of the National Football League (NFL)
- Duke Thomas, professional football player for the Dallas Cowboys of the NFL
- Alton Tobey, artist
- Frederick William True (1858–1914), zoologist
- Nicholas Tucci, actor
- Will Tye, professional football player for the New England Patriots of the NFL
- Edward Burr Van Vleck, mathematician
- John Hasbrouck Van Vleck, physicist and mathematician, co-recipient of the 1977 Nobel Prize in Physics
- Bill Watrous, jazz musician and band leader
- Allie Wrubel, composer and songwriter
- Walter Wriston, American banker and former chairman and CEO of Citicorp

The following notable people were not born in Middletown but lived there at some point in their lives:

- Jeff Bagwell, Hall of Fame MLB baseball player
- Horatio Strother, historian and educator
- Andre Drummond, American professional basketball player for the Chicago Bulls of the NBA
- Anthony Fantano, music critic and YouTuber
- William Raymond Manchester, American author, biographer, and historian

== Sister City ==
- Melilli, Italy

== See also ==
- National Register of Historic Places listings in Middletown, Connecticut
- Middlesex Corporate Center

== Sources ==
- History of Middlesex County 1635–1885: With Biographical Sketches of Its Prominent Men. Pratt & Read Co. New York: J. B. Beers & Co., 1884.
- History of Middlesex County, Connecticut, Whittemore, (New York, 1884)
- Middletown Upper Houses: A History of the North Society of Middletown from 1650 to 1800, C.C. Adams, (New York, 1908)
