= Middletown Nature Gardens =

Coordinates: 41.529°N 72.667°W

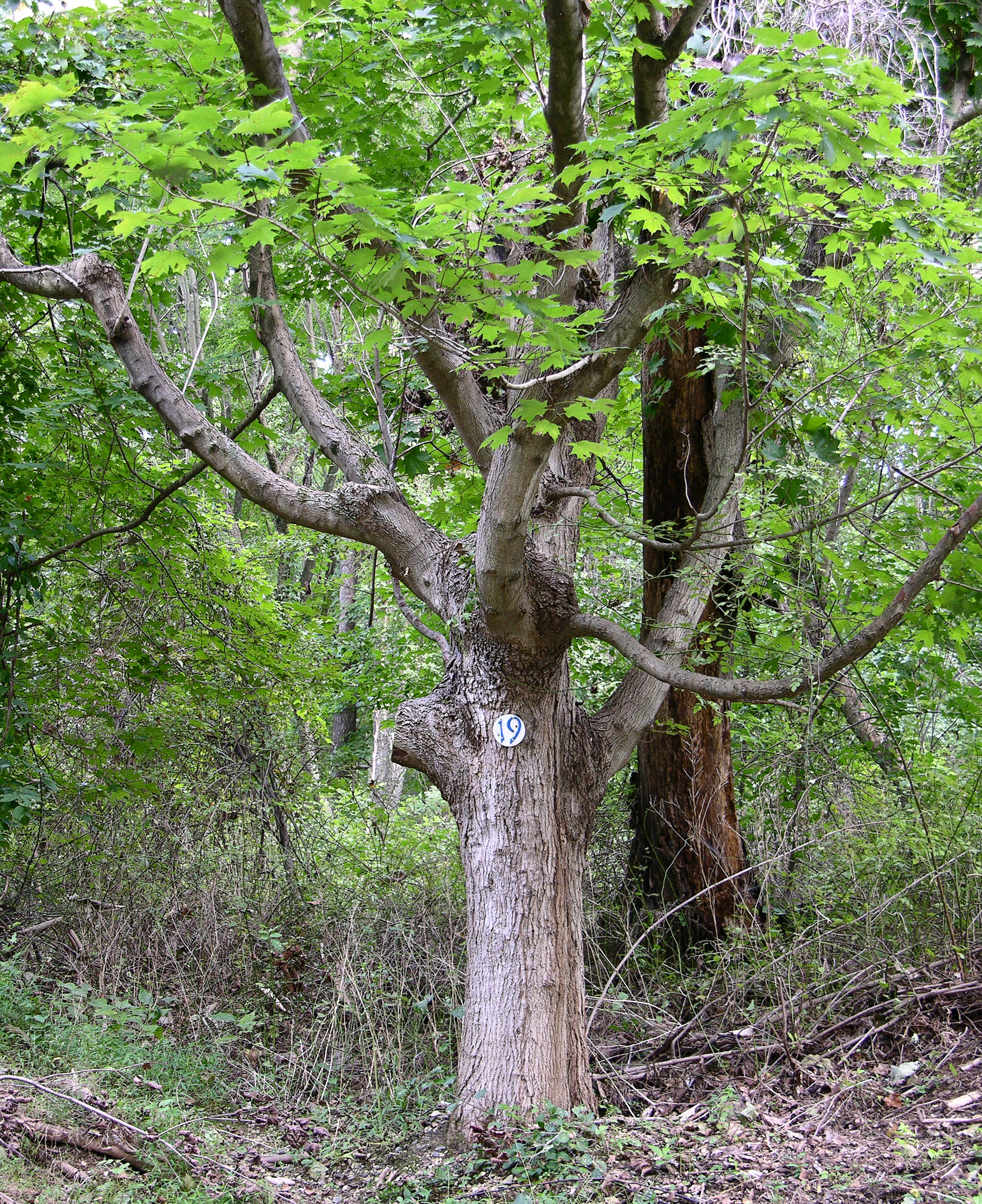

The Middletown Nature Gardens is located off Randolph Road in Middletown, Connecticut. In 1995, the city of Middletown, CT purchased the 18 acres (73,000 m^{2}) of land and dedicated it open space. This piece of land serves as a natural habitat to many plants and animals. There are many trails to walk about surrounded by an array of diverse trees and shrubs. Some of the types of trees and shrubs include red cedar, flowering dogwood, highbush blueberries, white pine, and speckled alder. The main trail is a 0.5-mile (0.80 km) loop. Mulched side trails, which branch off the main trail, add another 0.5 miles (0.80 km) to walk. Community volunteers maintain the park. They have erected many bluebird boxes and bat houses to house some of the natural wildlife of the park. There are also vernal pools, which are habitats for salamanders and wood frogs in the southeast corner of the park. There is even a 200-year-old sugar maple, which is called the “bee tree,” in which a large colony of bees has made it their home.
