= Dan Drew (politician) =

American politician

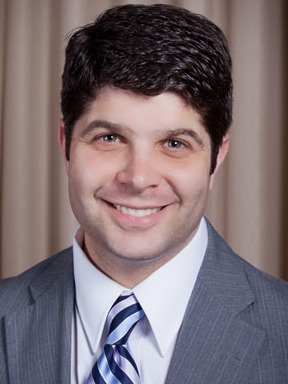
- Drew in 2011

Mayor of Middletown
- In office November 15, 2011 – November 12, 2019
- Preceded by: Sebastian Giuliano
- Succeeded by: Ben Florsheim

Personal details
- Born: Daniel Thomas Drew; December 26, 1979 (age 46) New York City
- Party: Democratic
- Spouse: Kate Drew
- Children: 4
- Education: University of Connecticut, Storrs (BA); Columbia University (MS)
- Website: Official website

Daniel Thomas Drew (born 1979) is an American politician from Connecticut and the former mayor of Middletown, Connecticut. Drew was elected mayor in 2011 and was re-elected in 2013 and 2015. He is a member of the Democratic Party.

In July 2017, Drew announced his candidacy for Governor of Connecticut, withdrawing from the race in January 2018.

== Early life and education ==
Dan Drew was born in New York City and was raised in New York and Connecticut.

At age 18, Drew volunteered as an EMT in Connecticut.

He attended the University of Connecticut (UConn) where he served as the editor-in-chief of The Daily Campus student newspaper, graduating in 2002 with a bachelor's degree in political science. On May 3, 2002, while still a UConn student Drew appeared on the Fox News television show The O'Reilly Factor and defended a fellow student's right to free speech despite the controversial content of the student's student-activity-fee-funded TV show.

In 2015, Drew graduated from Columbia University with a master's degree in organizational psychology.

== Political career ==
In 2009, Drew ran against incumbent mayor Sebastian Giuliano and lost 52–47%. He ran again in 2011, defeating Giuliano 53-46%. Facing no major party opponent, Drew was re-elected in 2013 with over 80 percent of the vote. In 2015, he was elected to a four-year term as Middletown voters approved an increase in the mayor's term.

In 2016, Drew made news when he donated a kidney to one of his constituents.

In 2018 Drew gave a TED talk at Wesleyan University on the misconceptions surrounding kidney donation.

On January 12, 2017, Drew announced he was forming an exploratory committee to run for Governor of Connecticut.

On July 12, 2017, Drew announced that he was running for Governor of Connecticut in the 2018 election. He withdrew from the race on January 12, 2018, exactly one year after forming an exploratory committee to run, stating that, "Ultimately it became very difficult to raise the required funds to qualify for public financing."

In 2019 Drew was named Co-Chair of the Board of Connecticut DonateLife.

== Electoral history ==
Middletown, Connecticut Mayoral Election, 2009
Party	Candidate	Votes	%
Republican	Sebastian Giuliano	4,388	52.3
Democratic	Dan Drew	3,902	46.5
Realistic Balance	Ruthann Johnson	104	1.2

Middletown, Connecticut Mayoral Election, 2011
Party	Candidate	Votes	%
Democratic	Dan Drew	4,959	52.5
Republican	Sebastian Giuliano (inc.)	4,317	45.7
Unaffiliated	Christine Berry Bourne	172	1.9

Middletown, Connecticut Mayoral Election, 2013
Party	Candidate	Votes	%
Democratic	Dan Drew (inc.)	5,102	84.2
Realistic Balance	John Kilian	955	15.8

Middletown, Connecticut Mayoral Election, 2015
Party	Candidate	Votes	%
Democratic	Dan Drew (inc.)	5,880	63.1
Republican	Sandra Russo-Driska	3,430	36.8
Unaffiliated	Brian Clark	3	0.03
