= Pameacha Pond =

Pond in Connecticut, United States

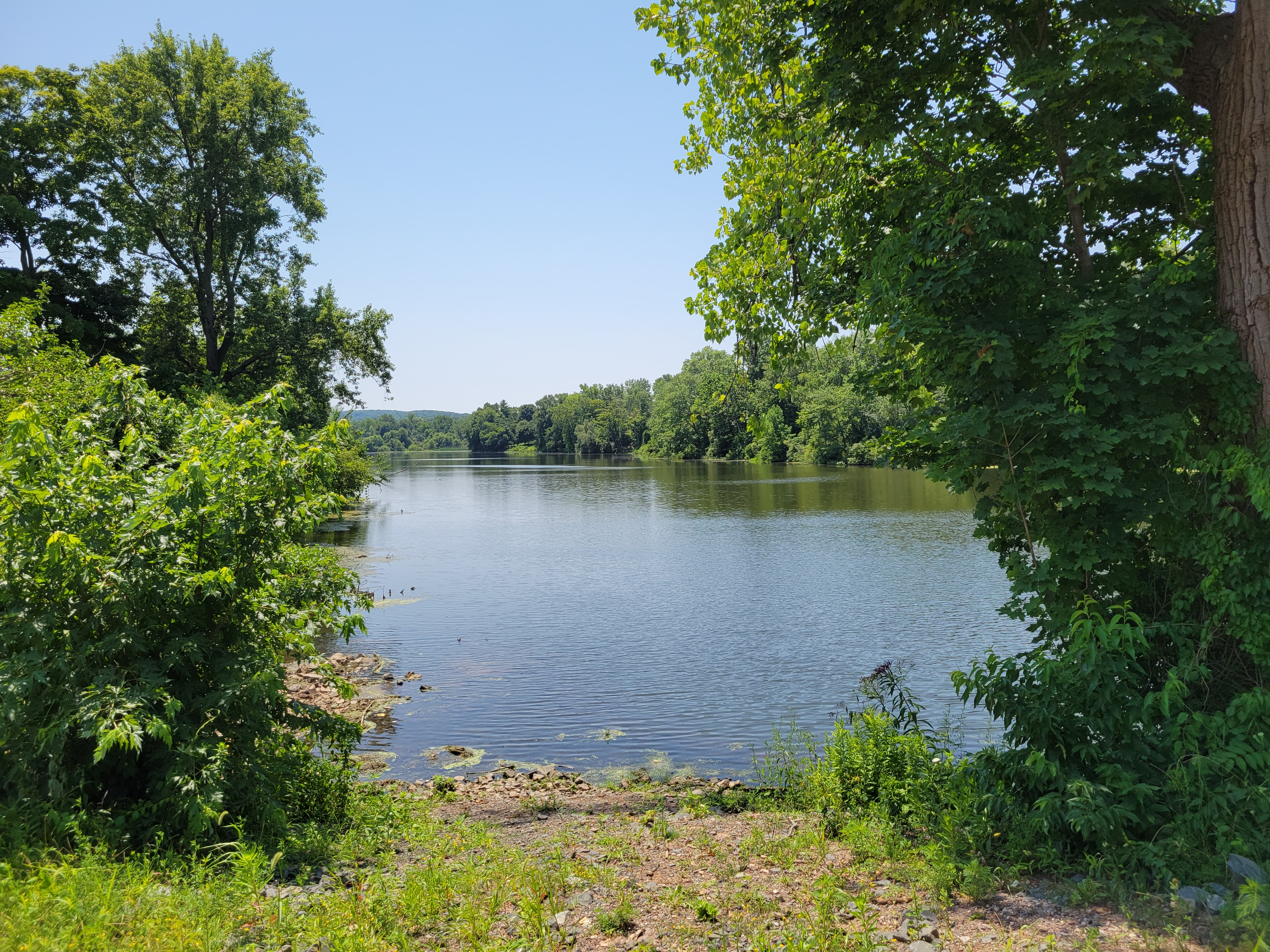
- Pameacha Pond
- Interactive map of Pameacha Pond
- Coordinates: 41.5443114°N 72.6531825°W

Pameacha Pond is a body of water in Middletown, Connecticut, located along South Main Street (Route 17). The pond exists behind a roughly 10.5 foot high by 83 foot long rough stone dam. According to City of Middletown officials, the brownstone dam was privately built for the former Wilcox, Crittenden & Co. factory. A 1980 report by the Army Corps of Engineers estimated the structure was built in 1870. At the time, the dam was the factory's primary source of water power.

== Inspections ==
A 1980 inspection report indicated the dam structure appeared to be in poor condition. In 2018, another inspection report promoted the city of Middletown to enter into a consent decree to repair, replace, or remove the dam, as well as repair a sanitary sewer line that passed near the structure. A conceptual plan prepared by city that would remove the dam and build a park along the bottom of the former pond met local opposition. In January 2024, a section of the dam broke open. The city's deputy director of public works noted the city already had approved the replacement or restoration of the 150-year-old dam earlier this year. He said they are requesting $5 million for the construction component of that work, and design will cost more.
