= Artists For World Peace =

Organization based in Connecticut, US

Artists for World Peace
- Formation: 2003; 22 years ago
- Type: Nonprofit
- Headquarters: Middletown, Connecticut
- Website: http://www.artistsforworldpeace.org/

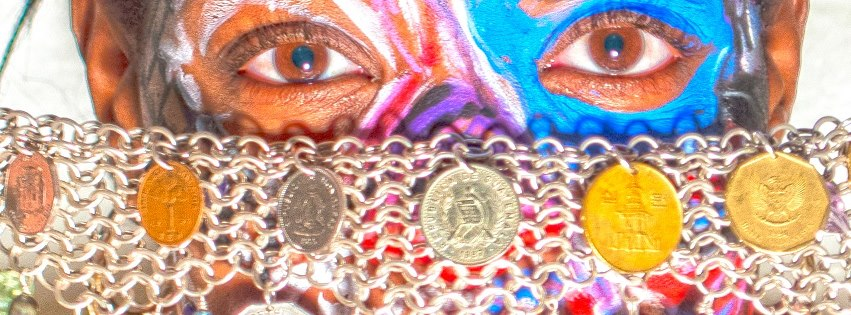
The Peaceful Unity of All Nations

Artists For World Peace (AFWP) is a registered 501(c)(3) non-profit grassroots organization based in Middletown, Connecticut, US. It is a community of artists and activists working to feed the hungry, house the poor, and encourage peace throughout the world.

== History ==
Since 2003, Artists For World Peace has organized numerous events and performances to raise money for their ongoing efforts with the International Peace Belt and humanitarian efforts in Tanzania, Brazil, Haiti and locally in Connecticut. Wendy Black Nasta serves as the executive director, she is also the founder of AFWP.

AFWP's governing board is composed of Wendy Black Nasta as the President, Jennifer Lia as Treasurer, Jane Bance Homick as Secretary and an advisory Council of Elders.

== Performance events ==
Artists For World Peace has created a curated a number of performances.

AFWP on Broadway is an annual event held in New York, New York. Broadway performers from various shows come together for one night every year to raise money for the humanitarian projects that Artists For World Peace produces.

In 2011, the first AFWP on Broadway was held on November 6, at the Helen Mills Theater in New York City.

In 2012, AFWP on Broadway 2 was accompanied with a silent auction, and a display of four works painted by the Fashion Institute of Technology's delegation to Art Basel Miami make up the backdrop of the stage. The participating artists worked in paris: Melissa Starke & Garrett Klein, Eric Gottshall & Lydia Maria Pfeffer, Kenneth Park & Slavko Djuric, and Valentina Burzanovic & Jennifer L. Torres. The Broadway performers for the evening were; Deanna Aguinaga, Stephen Carrasco, Andrew Chappelle, Adrienne Jean Fisher, Andrea Goss, Monica Kapoor, Raymond J. Lee, Carrie Manolakos, Marissa McGowan, Paul HeeSang Miller, Ryann Redmon, Sharone Sayegh, L. Steven Taylor, Traci Victoria, Blake Whyte, Alex Wyse, and Leah Zepel.

The 2013 AFWP on Broadway 3 was held on October 13, at New York City's 54 Below. Among the performing artists was singer/actress Allison Strong.

The 2014 AFWP on Broadway 4 was held on October 5 at New York City's Joe's Pub at the public theater.

The 2015 AFWP on Broadway 5 was held on October 11, at New York City's Joe's Pub at the acclaimed public theater.

== Relief efforts ==
Children of Peace is a program established by AFWP to pay for the living and educational expenses of children all over the world. This initiative supports kids in China, Haiti, India, and Tanzania. Under the Children of Peace umbrella, they have also helped Haitian students travel to Brazil, where they are pursuing higher education unavailable in their home country. The children in the program from Kibosho, Tanzania attend the Mlama Secondary School in Kibosho Umbwe. The other children attend the Moshi Academy in Moshi.

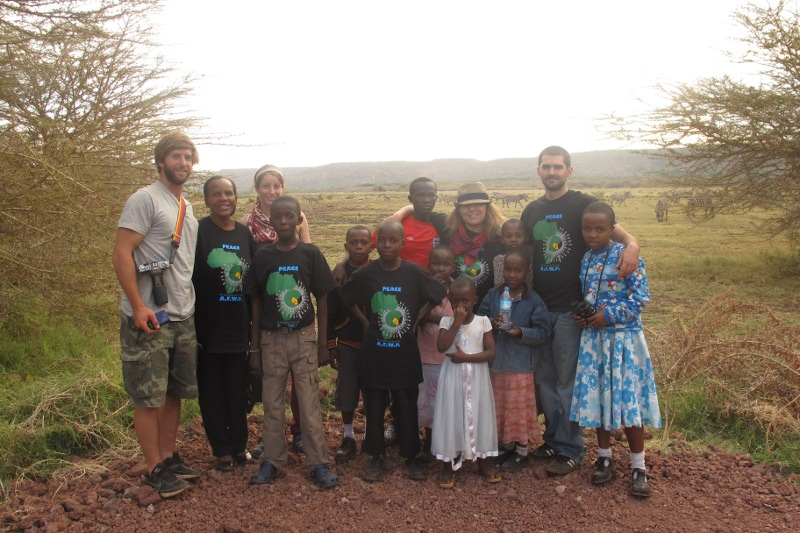
Children of Peace in Kibosho, Tanzania

Peace Pig Club is a partnership with the Good Hope Trust in Kibosho Umbwe, Tanzania. The objective of the project is to provide animal protein to the center community, and to raise income to support the cost of running the center. The project is located at the orphanage centre at Kibosho Umbew, Onana Village, Moshi District, Kilimanjaro region. It is a way for the community to become self-sufficient.

In 2012 AFWP also raised the funds to support the Community Health Center in Kibosho Umbwe.

In the past AFWP created the Santa Clara Scholarship Endowment Fund, created a safe house for women and children in Cambodia, delivered 500 pairs of shoes up the Amazon waterway to the indigenous Shuar children in Ecuador, and assisted in the building of the Amazon Refuge School.

== Scholarships ==
AFWP delivers art scholarships to students attending Middlesex Community College in Middletown, Connecticut.
