= South Green Historic District =

South Green Historic District may refer to:

- South Green Historic District (Hartford, Connecticut), listed on the National Register of Historic Places (NRHP) in Hartford County, Connecticut
- Middletown South Green Historic District, Middletown, Connecticut, NRHP-listed, in Middlesex County, Connecticut
- South Green Historic District (Ipswich, Massachusetts), NRHP-listed, in Essex County, Massachusetts
