= Main Street Historic District (Middletown, Connecticut) =

Historic district in Connecticut, United States

- U.S. National Register of Historic Places
- U.S. Historic district
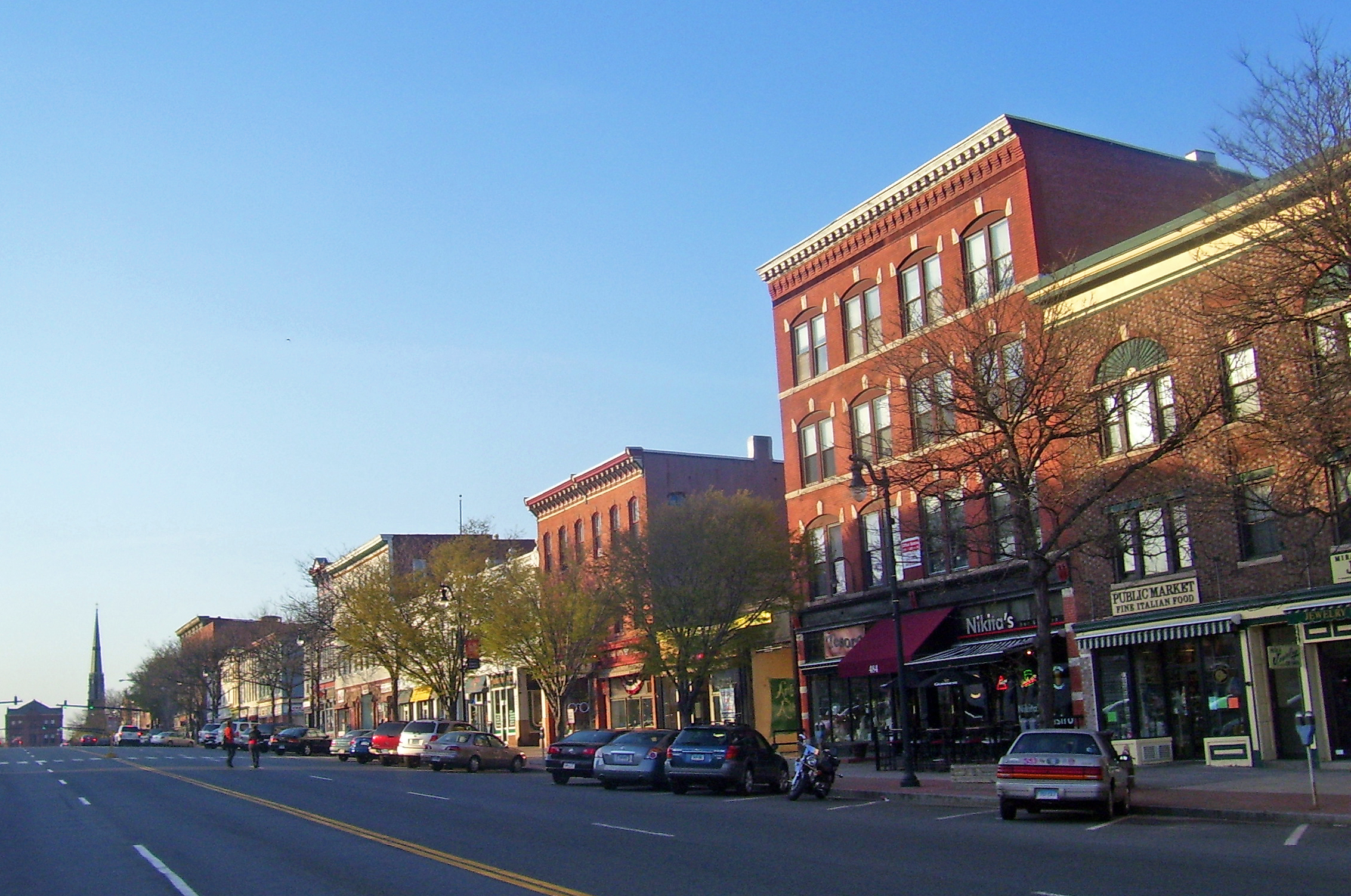
- Northward view along Main Street from CT 66 junction, 2008

- Location within Connecticut Location within the United States
- Location: Middletown, Connecticut
- Coordinates: 41.563°N 72.648°W
- Area: 20.5 acres (8.3 ha)
- Architect: Multiple
- Architectural style: Late Victorian, Mixed (more than 2 styles from different periods)
- NRHP reference No.: 83001275
- Added to NRHP: June 30, 1983

The Main Street Historic District encompasses the historic commercial center of Middletown, Connecticut, United States. Middletown was one of the most important ports on the Connecticut River during the colonial period, and Main Street "has been the center of community life since the earliest period of settlement". Today Main Street is home to a number of 19th century buildings, maintaining the bulk of its historic character. It was listed on the National Register of Historic Places in 1983.

== Properties included ==
The district extends along Main Street from St. John's Square (junction with Spring Street) in the north, for five blocks on the west side (to College Street) and 4-1/2 blocks on the right (midway between Washington and Court Streets), abutting the Metro South Historic District on the west side, and modern buildings on the right.

According to the National Register of Historic Places (NRHP) nomination for the district, two properties in the district—the Church of the Holy Trinity and the Old Middletown Post Office are already on the NRHP in their own right. Three other individual properties were determined to be for NRHP status in their own right: the Arthur Magill, Jr. House/Chase School at 631 Main Street, the Main Street Firehouse at 533 Main Street, and the North End Meeting House at 710-712 Main Street. More generally, the entire block on the east side of Main Street from Washington to Ferry Streets, and numbers 560-614 from Ferry to Green were determined to be eligible.

== Contributing properties ==
Contributing properties according to the 1983 nomination for the district:

- 225 Main Street, Farmers & Mechanics Savings Bank, 1920
- 237-45 Main Street, Nehemiah Hubbard House, before 1788, major Greek Revival style remodeling. (No longer extant 2012: 225 Main Street has an annex on this site.)
- 267 Main Street, Connecticut Bank and Trust, 1920, Renaissance Revival (Prior to use by CBT, was Middletown National Bank)
- 291 Main Street, Old Post Office, 1916, Renaissance Revival
- 315 Main Street, Middletown Savings Bank, 1928, Academic Classicism
- 319-323 Main Street, Old Banking House Block, 1796 - south section; 1815 - north section
- 335 Main Street, Guy & Rice Building, 1930, Renaissance Revival
- 339-351 Main Street, Commercial Building, 1892, originally erected as YMCA
- 354 Main Street, The Capitol Theater, 1925, Neo-Classical Revival
- 357-359 Main Street, Hubbard-Holland Building, 1873
- 360 Main Street, Pythian Building, ca. 1874, remodeled 1938, Renaissance Revival detail
- 363 Main Street, Central National Bank Building, 1915, Renaissance Revival detail, remodelled 1980
- 366-386 Main Street, James H. Bunce Company, ca. 1920, early Modern Commercial
- 381 Main Street, The Church of the Holy Trinity, 1871–1874, Gothic Revival, Henry Dudley architect
- 388-392 Main Street, Wrubel Building, early 20th century, contemporary marble facing over Art Deco facade (now Main Street Market)
- 393 Main Street, City Savings Bank, ca. 1915, Colonial Revival
- 412-416 Main Street, R.W. Camp Company, 1920, Renaissance Revival
- 418-420 Main Street, Sheldon Building, 1866, mid-19th century Commercial
- 422-426 Main Street, Pagan's Block, 1868, Victorian Italianate
- 437 Main Street, Commercial Building, early 20th century commercial
- 428-432 Main Street, Woolworth Building, 1939, Commercial Art Deco
- 438-440 Main Street, Washington Building, 1915, early 20th century Commercial
- 62-70 Washington Street, Stueck's Modern Tavern, 1914, Renaissance Revival
- 460 Main Street, Steuck's Block, 1893, Late 19th century Commercial
- 472 Main Street, Penny Press Building; Alsop-King Building, 1873–4, Commercial Italianate
- 476-478 Main Street, Pagan's New Block, 1912, Early Modern Commercial with Classical Revival detail
- 484-494 Main Street, Caulkins & Post Building, 1889–1890, Commercial
- 489-493 Main Street, Caulkin's Buick-Cadillac, 1905, Early 20th century Commercial
- 501-507 Main Street, St. Aloysius Building, 1894, with 1916 Georgian Revival remodeling; a.k.a. St. Aloysius Society Building; collapsed 2 February 2011
- 502-508 Main Street, Ward-Cody Building, 1880, Victorian Commercial, Birthplace of Major General Maurice Rose
- 512-522 Main Street, J. Poliner & Sons, 1925, Colonial Revival
- 533 Main Street, Central Fire Station, 1899, Renaissance Revival Fire Station
- 530-540 Main Street, Palmer Building, 1900, Early 20th century Commercial
- 542-544 Main Street, Southmayd's Building, 1872, Victorian Commercial with Classical detail
- 546-548 Main Street, J. Poliner & Sons Shoe Store, 1833, 19th century Commercial
- 560-564 Main Street, Lawton & Wall Block, 1867, Italianate Commercial unbroken common cornice with 566-576 Main Street and identical facade.
- 566 Main Street, Lawton & Wall Block, 1870-1874
- 574-576 Main Street, Lawton & Wall Block, 1870–1874, Italianate Commercial
- 578-582 Main Street, 1894, Late 19th century Commercial
- 584-588 Main Street, Shlien's Furniture, 1897, Commercial Italianate
- 598-614 Main Street, Hotchkiss Block, Late 19th century Commercial
- 9-11 Liberty Street, Mission Chapel, 1853, Greek Revival
- 601-607 Main Street, Hotel Arrigoni, 1914, Colonial Revival
- 613-617 Main Street, Scranton Building, 1876, Commercial Italianate
- 630-636 Main Street, Spencer-Annenberg Block, 1897, 19th century Commercial
- 625-631 Main Street, Arthur Magill, Jr. House-Chase School, 1821, Federal-Greek Revival
- 635 Main Street, 1920, Early 20th century Commercial
- 642-644 Main Street, Murphy's Drug Store, 1895, Commercial
- 648-654 Main Street, Spencer Annenberg Block, 1870, addition 1911
- 656-664 Main Street, 1898, Commercial
- 666 Main Street, Stow Block, 1893, Commercial
- 682-686 Main Street, Kabatznick Building, 1922, modern commercial with classical details
- 695-699 Main Street, early 20th century Commercial
- 696-700 Main Street, Applequest Block, 1898, Commercial Victorian
- 710-712 Main Street, Fourth Meeting House of the First Church of Christ, Scientist, 1799, Federal style church
- 716-724 Main Street, Early 20th century Commercial (no longer extant 2012)
- 738 Main Street, O'Rourke's Diner, Early 20th century, erected on current site in 1947; Diner, Art Deco detail
- Hartford Avenue, Riverview Cemetery, 1650–1850, dating from earliest settlement; much of it destroyed ca. 1950 for highway construction.
- St. John's Street, St. John's Cemetery, 1850–present, from earliest settlement of Irish immigrants; behind St. John's Roman Catholic Church. Notable for the extensive biographical information on the headstones, including birthplace in Ireland, family members and cause of death.
- 5 St. John's Street, St. John's Parochial School, 1887, Victorian Institutional
- 9 St. John's Street, St. John's Roman Catholic Church, 1852, spire-1864, Gothic Revival
- 19 St. John's Street, St. John's Rectory, 1864, Second Empire
- 33 St. John's Street, Catholic Charities Building, 1872, Victorian Institutional
- King's Avenue, Trolley Barn, 1894, Late 19th century Industrial

There are also 10 non-contributing properties in the district.

== Pictures ==
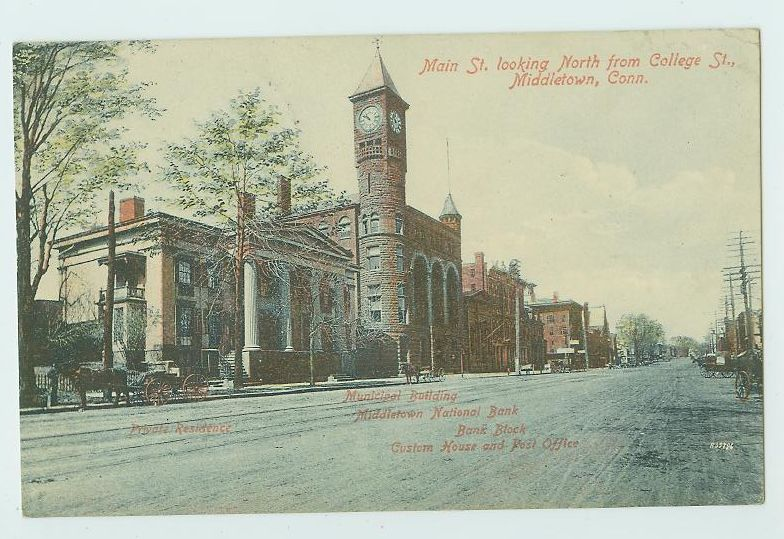
Main Street, looking north from College Street, with the Municipal Building towering in the middle, from a postcard sent in 1914

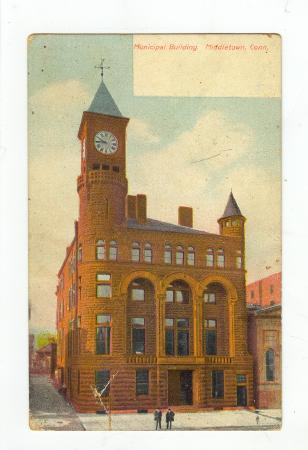
Municipal Building, before 1907

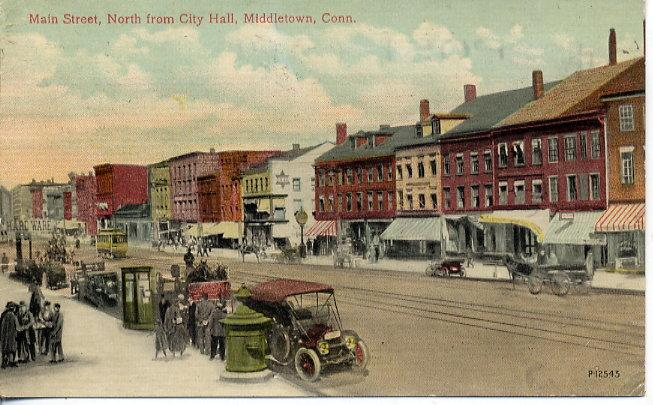
Main Street, looking north "from City Hall", about 1912

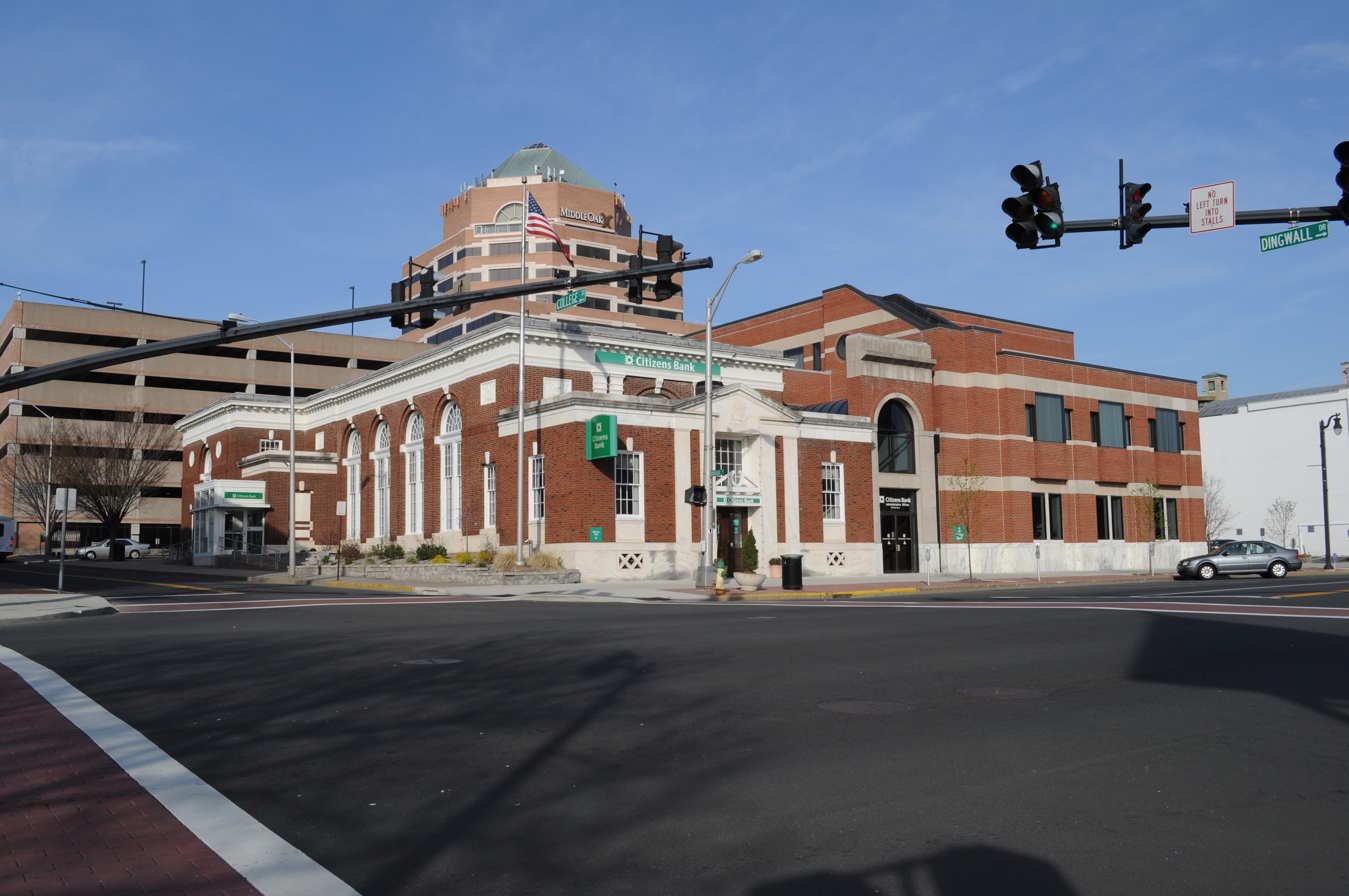
Former Farmers & Mechanics Bank, now Citizens Bank, southernmost property in the district, 2012

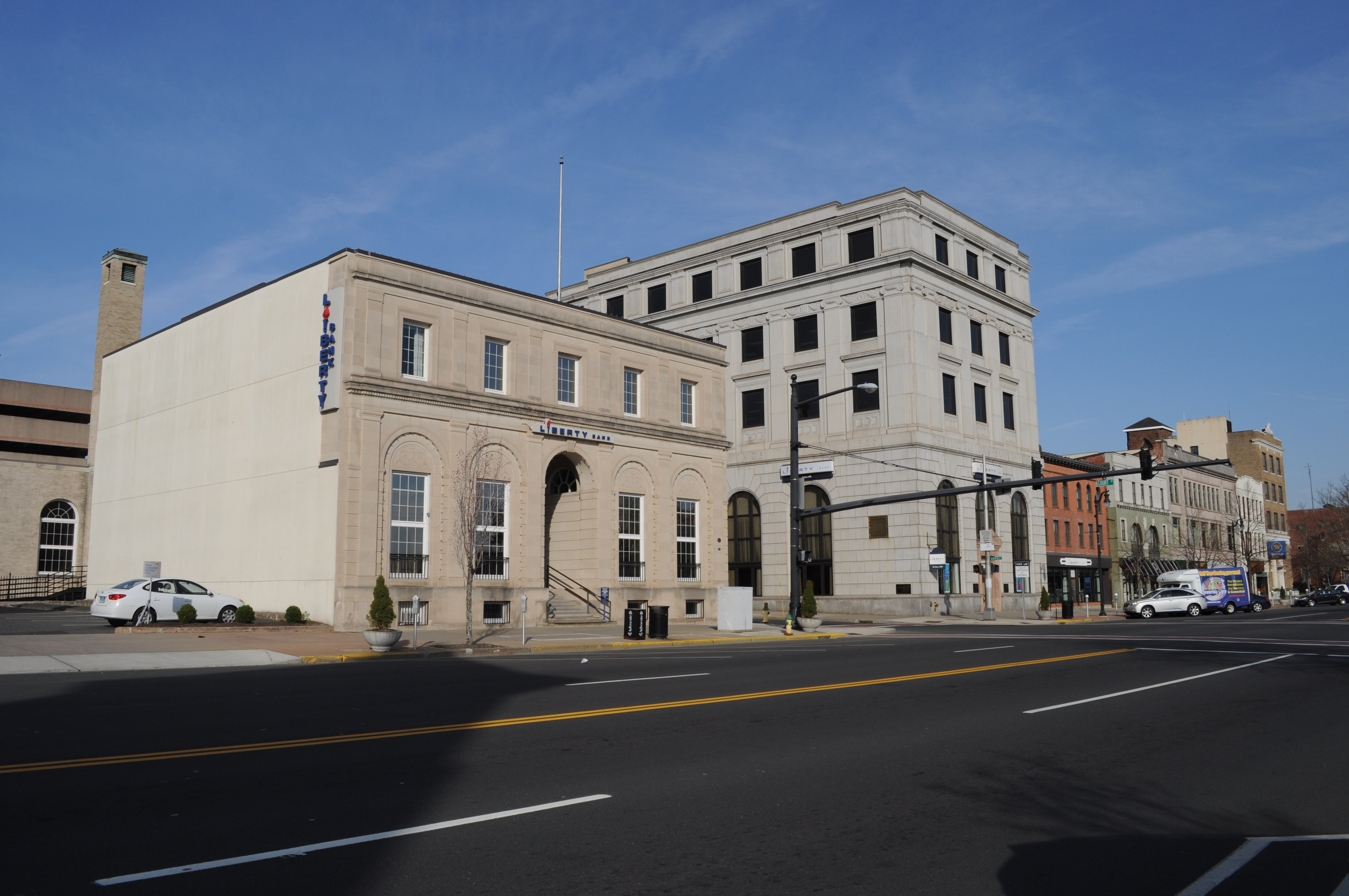
Liberty Bank is now headquartered in the three historic buildings at left in this image: the old post office, the former Middletown Savings Bank and the Old Banking House Block. 2012

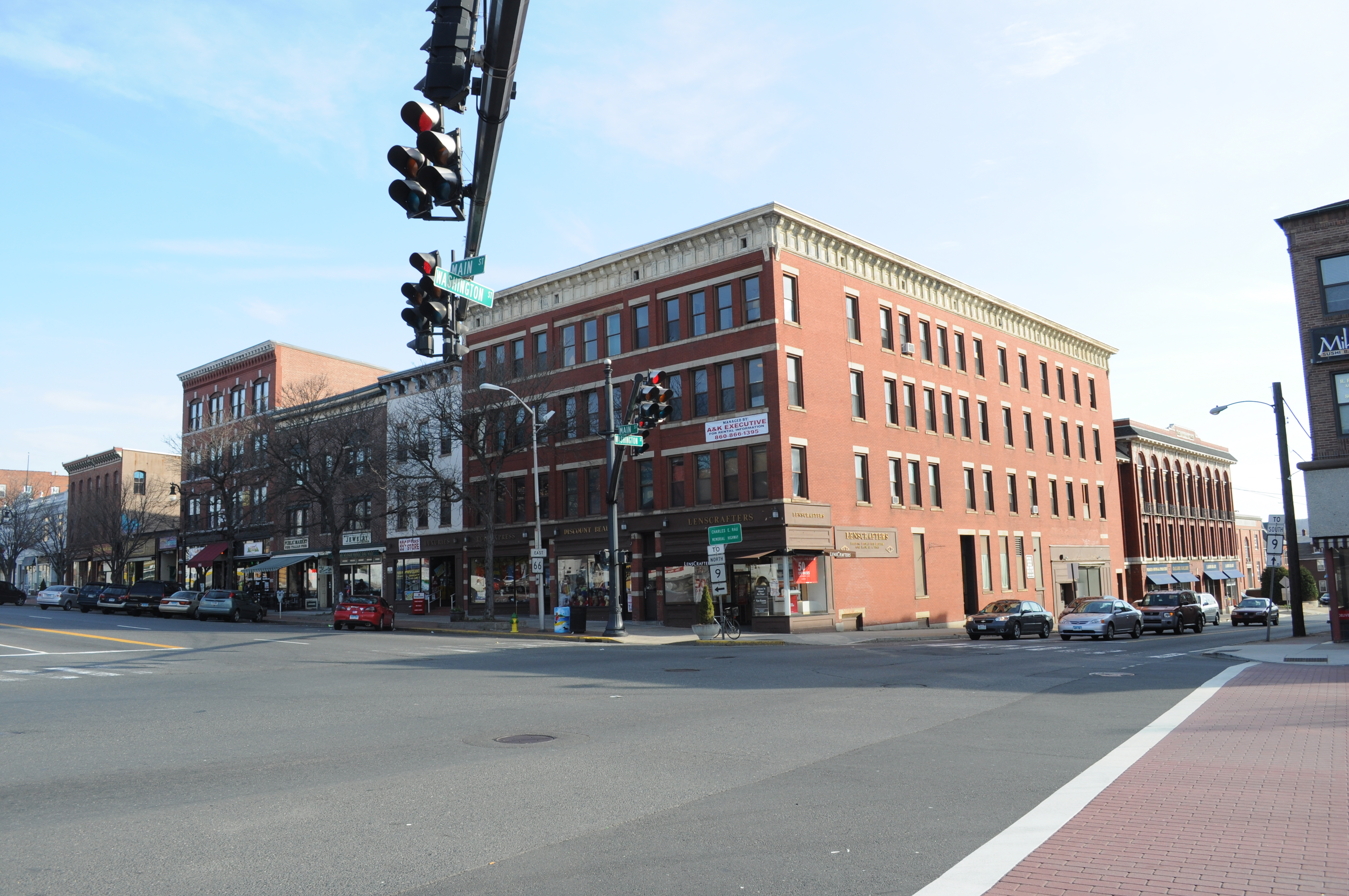
Northeast corner of Main and Washington, 2012

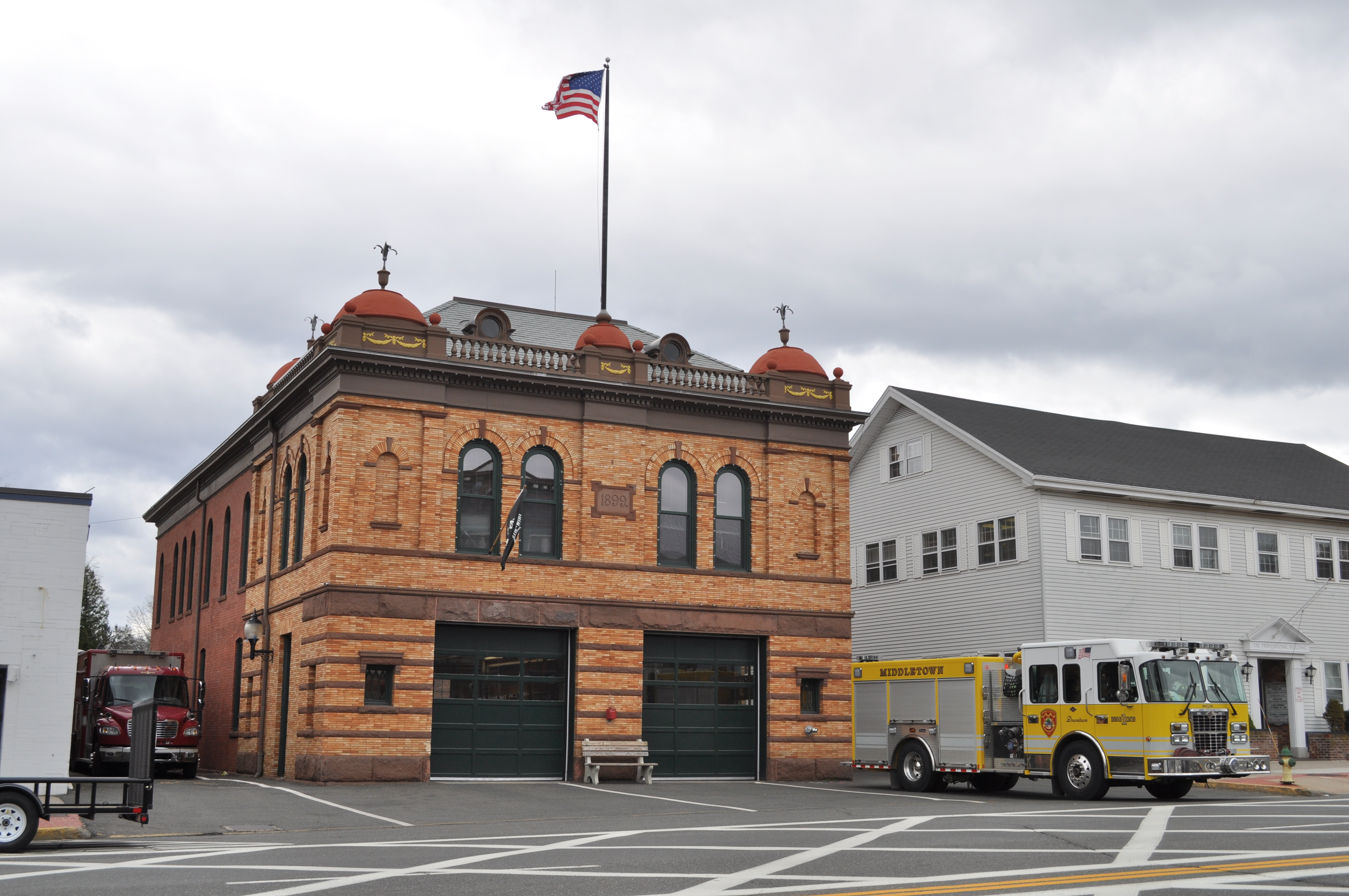
Main Street Firehouse, 2012, "a focal point for... [the west] side of the street"

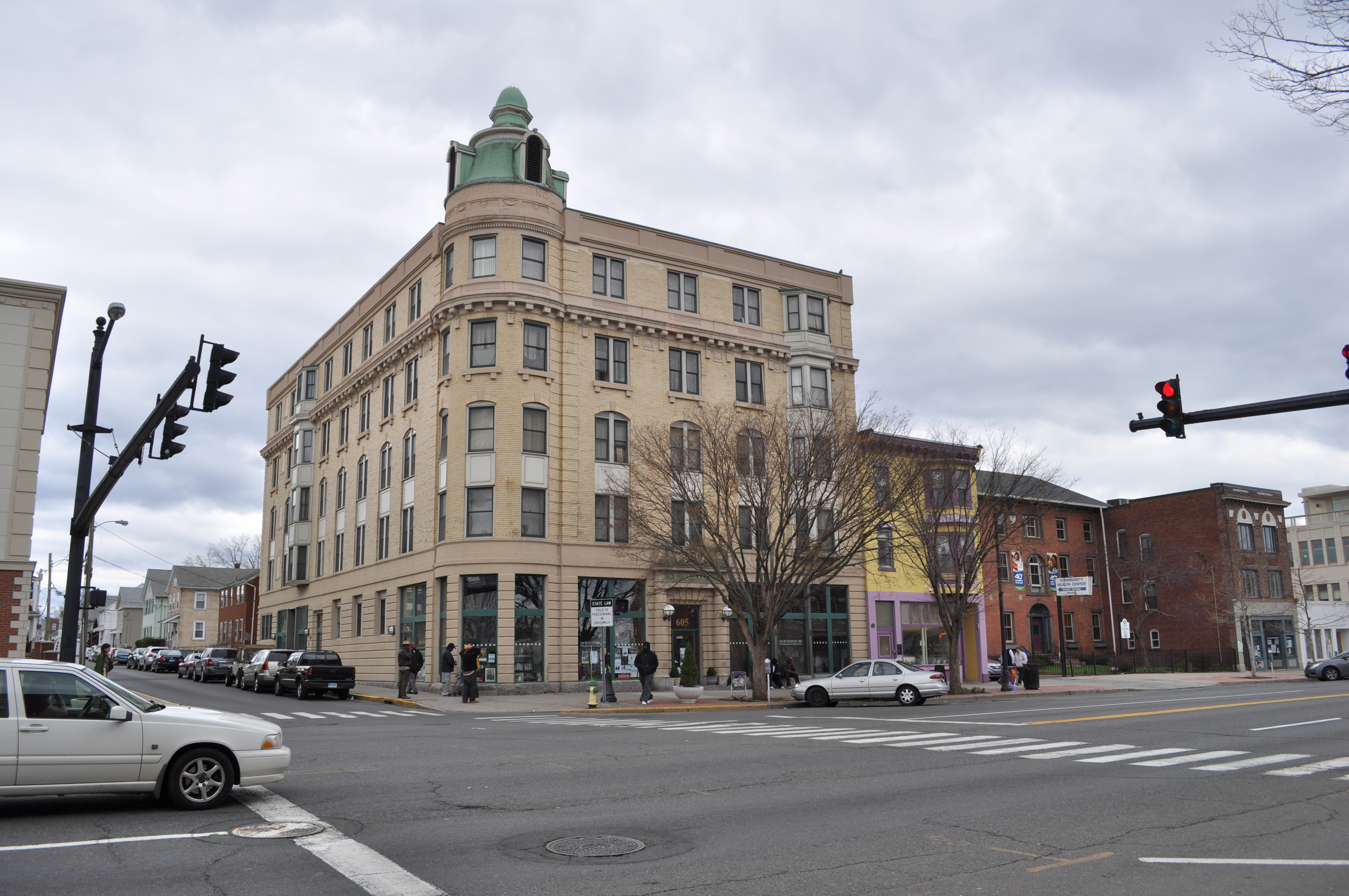
West side of Main Street in the North End. The former Hotel Arrigoni; Scranton Building;Arthur Magill, Jr. House - Chase School; and a 1920 commercial building at 635 Main Street.

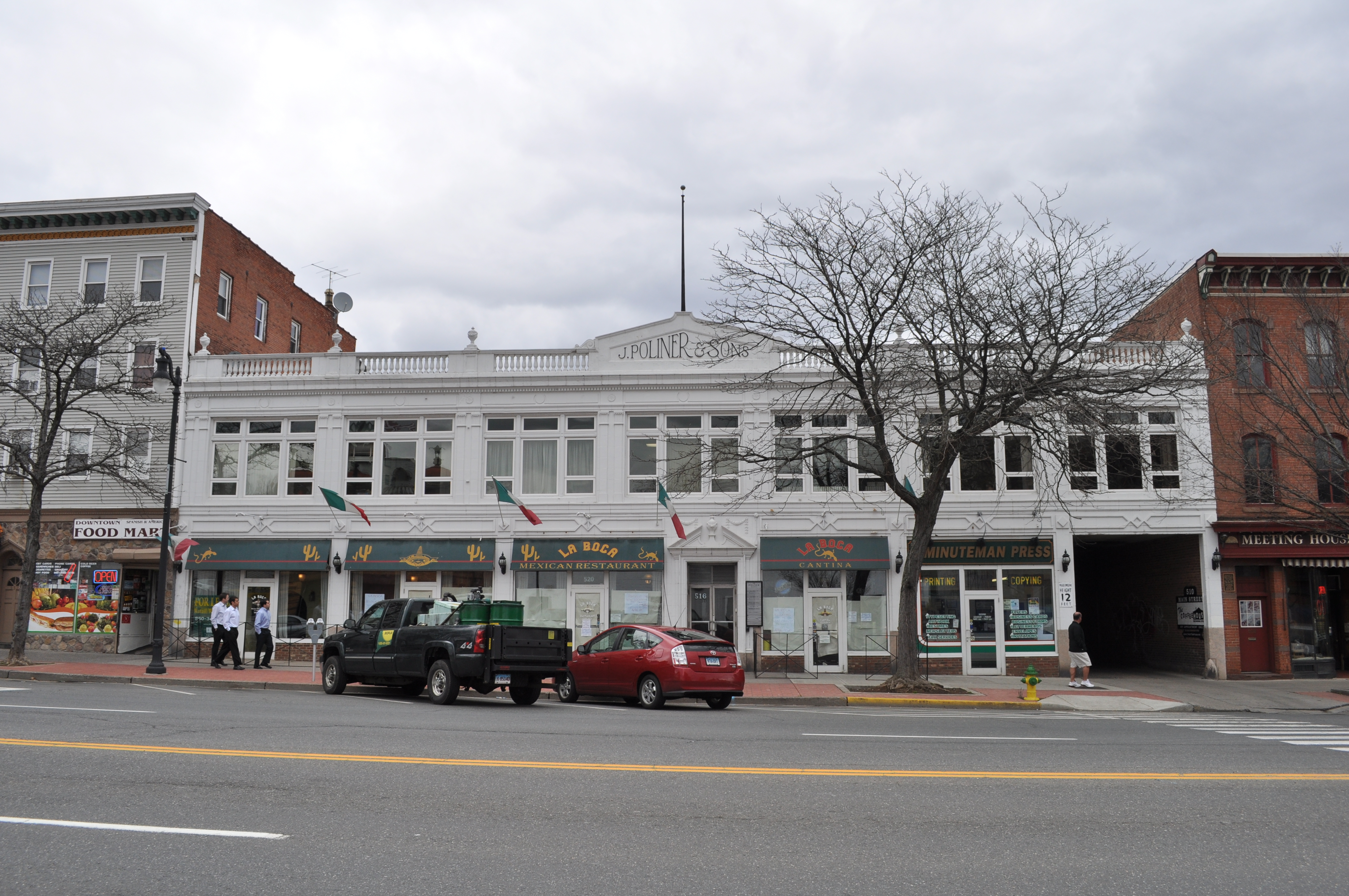
J. Poliner & Sons Building, across from the firehouse, 2012

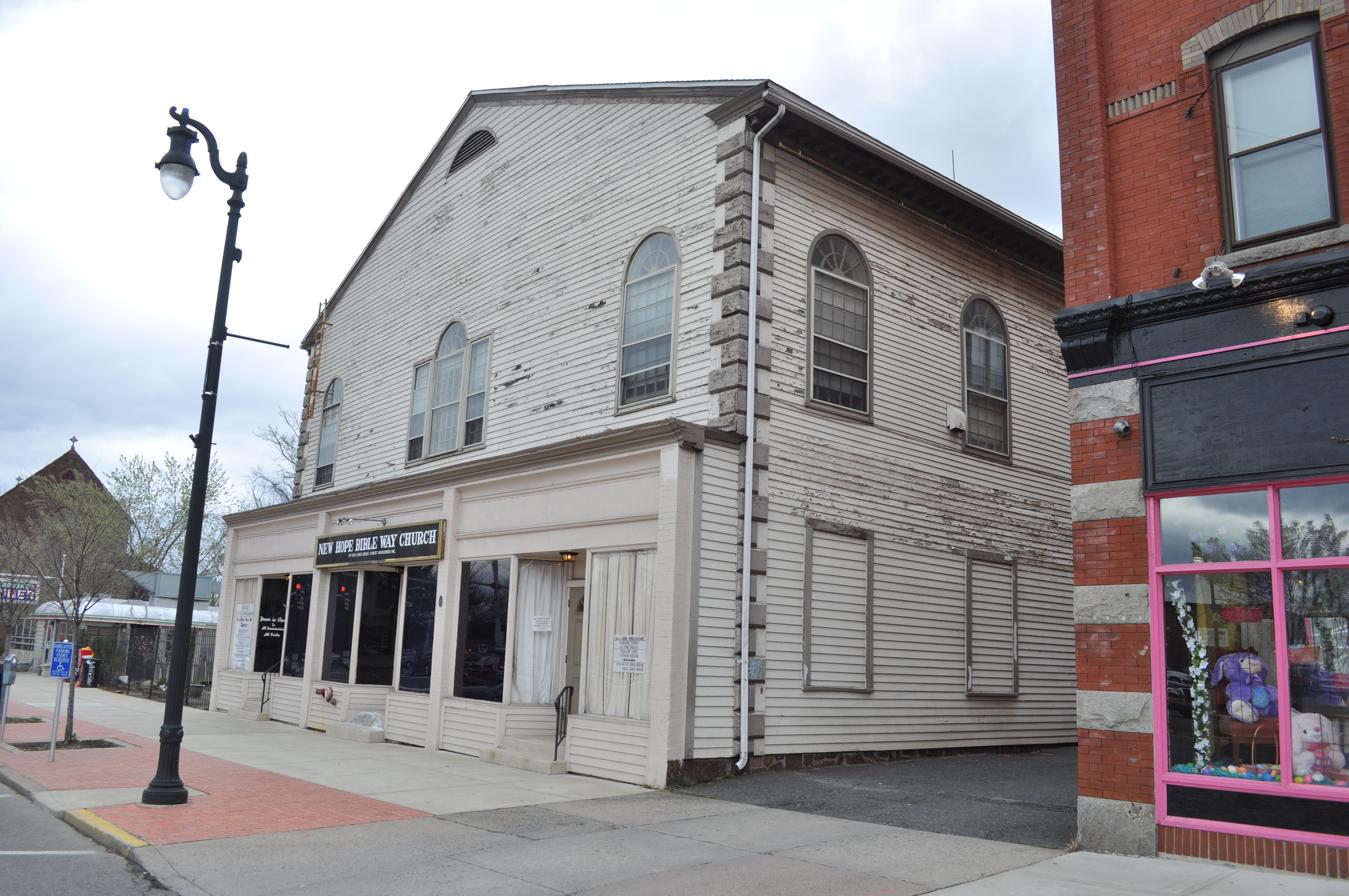
Fourth Meeting House of the First Church of Christ, a.k.a. North End Meeting House. Now New Hope Bible Way Church, 2012

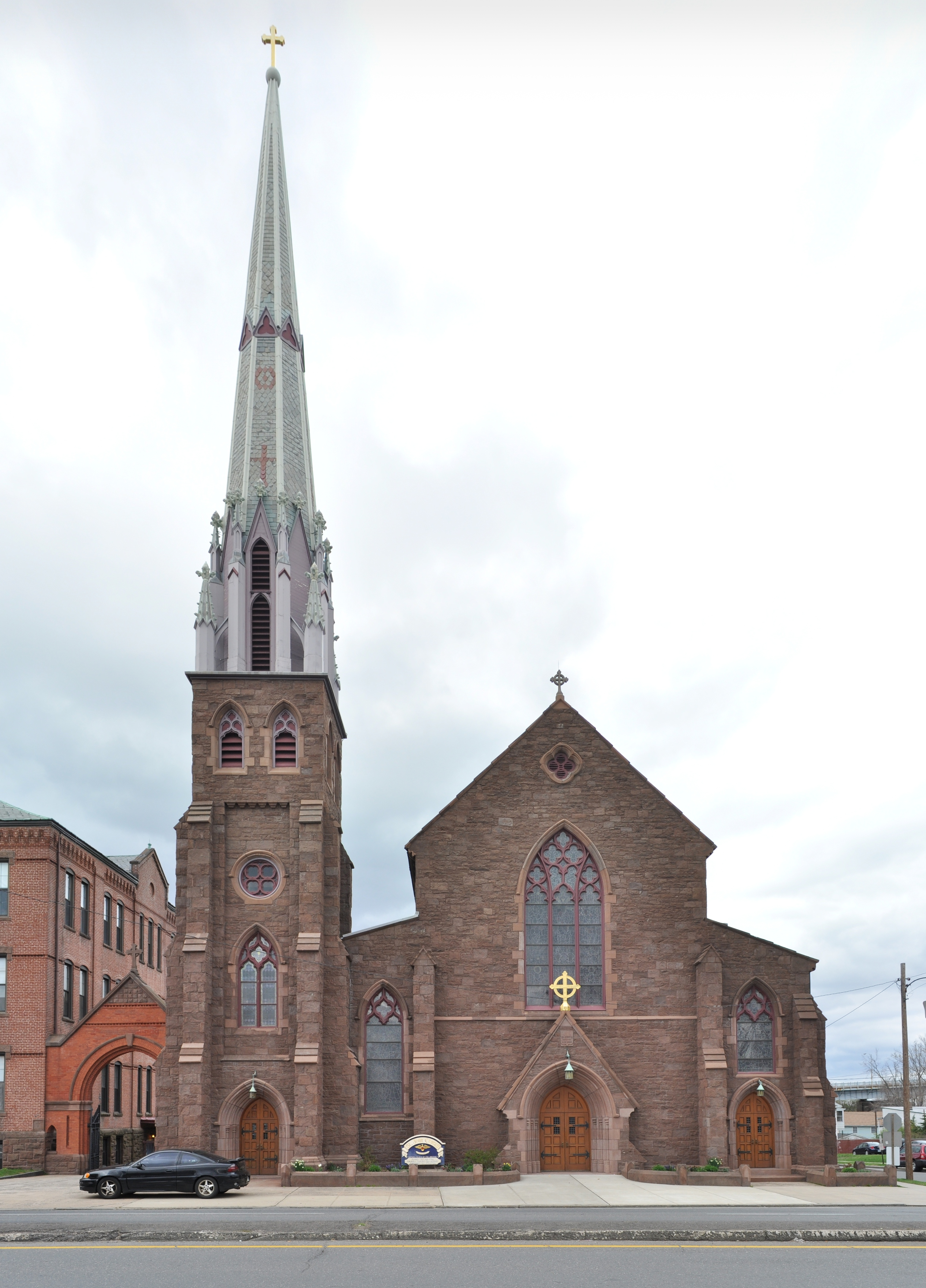
Saint John's Roman Catholic Church, 2012

== See also ==
- National Register of Historic Places listings in Middletown, Connecticut
