= Maurice Rose =

United States Army general

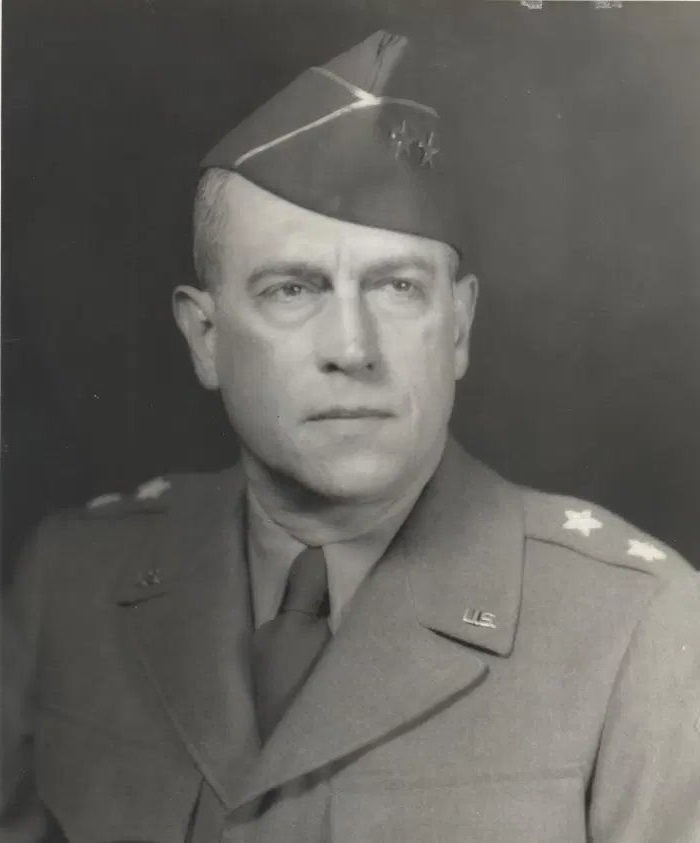
- Rose shortly after becoming commander of the 3rd Armored Division in the fall of 1944
- Born: November 26, 1899; Middletown, Connecticut, U.S.
- Died: March 30, 1945 (aged 45); Near Paderborn, Nazi Germany
- Burial place: Netherlands American Cemetery and Memorial, Margraten, Netherlands
- Military career
- Allegiance: United States of America
- Branch: Colorado National Guard; United States Army
- Service years: 1916 (National Guard); 1917–1919 (Army); 1920–1945 (Army)
- Rank: Major General
- Service number: 0-8439
- Units: Infantry Branch; Cavalry Branch; Armor Branch
- Commands: 3rd Battalion, 13th Armored Regiment; Combat Command A, 2nd Armored Division; 3rd Armored Division
- Conflicts: World War I Occupation of the Rhineland; World War II †
- Awards: Distinguished Service Cross; Distinguished Service Medal; Silver Star (3); Legion of Merit (2); Purple Heart (2); Bronze Star Medal (2); Legion of Honor (France); Croix de Guerre (France); Croix de Guerre (Belgium)

Maurice Rose (November 26, 1899 – March 30, 1945) was a career officer in the United States Army who attained the rank of major general. A veteran of World War I and World War II, Rose was commanding the 3rd Armored Division when he was killed in action in Germany during the closing days of the Second World War becoming the highest-ranking American killed by enemy fire during the war in Europe.

Rose was the son and grandson of rabbis from Poland; at the time of his death he was the highest-ranking Jewish person in the United States Army. He was not especially religious, did not publicize his faith, and stated in his Army records that he was Protestant.

Rose was married twice and had two sons.

The 3rd Armored Division's official history of World War II memorialized Rose by stating "He was over six feet tall, erect, dark haired, and had finely chiseled features. He was firm and prompt of decision, brooking no interference by man, events or conditions in order to destroy the enemy."

== Early life ==
Rose was born in Middletown, Connecticut, on November 26, 1899, the son of Rabbi Samuel Rose and Katherin "Katy" (Bronowitz) Rose. In 1902, the Rose family relocated to Denver, Colorado, where Rose was raised and educated. He attended East High School, where he was editor of the school newspaper and graduated with honors in 1916. His desire for a military career became well known among his classmates; in the school yearbook, a cartoon illustrating the newspaper staff depicted him carrying a rifle.

Rose lied about his age to enlist in the Colorado National Guard as a private after graduating from high school, hoping to serve in the Pancho Villa Expedition. However, he was discharged six weeks later when his commander was informed that he was underage.

Rose was raised in a Jewish household; his father was a businessman who operated a dress design shop with Rose's mother and later became a rabbi. Rose had a bar mitzvah and could speak Yiddish and read Hebrew. Though brought up Jewish, and identified as Jewish in post-World War I newspaper articles that recorded the bravery of Jewish U.S. Army soldiers, he began to identify himself as Protestant in military records soon afterwards. Biographers and researchers believe he could have undergone a religious conversion, though there are no records to substantiate this. Instead, they believe it is more likely that Rose was not especially religious as an adult, and identified as Protestant in his military records as a way to assimilate with his peers and increase his chances for advancement as his career progressed. Rose's grave marker is a Christian cross, but he is still regarded as a significant figure in U.S. Jewish history.

== Military career ==
=== World War I ===
Rose worked for a year in a meatpacking plant where one of his brothers was employed, and enlisted again in 1917 after he obtained his parents' permission. Rose was soon selected for officer training, and falsely claimed to have been born in 1895 so that he would appear to meet the minimum required age of twenty-one. (Note: Rose eventually had his birth date corrected in Army records. It still appeared as 1895 in the 1937 Army Register, but by the time of the 1938 edition, his birth year was correctly reported as 1899.) After graduating from Officer Candidate School (OCS) at Fort Riley, Kansas in August 1917, Rose was commissioned as a Reserve second lieutenant of Infantry.

With American entry into World War I having occurred in April 1917, after receiving his commission, Rose was assigned to command a platoon in the 353rd Infantry Regiment, a unit of the 89th Division. The division was organized and trained at Camp Funston to prepare for service in France, and in December 1917 he was promoted to temporary first lieutenant. In May 1918, the division traveled by train to Camp Mills, New York, and it departed for Europe by ship in June. Later that month, the 89th Division arrived in Liverpool, England and a week later they arrived in France.

The 89th Division completed additional training until August, when it relieved the 82nd Division in the Lucey sector, near the city of Toul. Rose's battalion of the 353rd Infantry took up defensive positions near Metz, where they began preparations to participate in the Meuse–Argonne offensive. Rose took part in combat throughout the offensive, and was wounded at St. Mihiel, including being hit by shrapnel during a German mortar and artillery barrage, as well as sustaining a concussion. He initially refused to be evacuated, but he collapsed from exhaustion. Medics removed him from the battlefield, and he was taken to the 89th Division's hospital near the village of Flirey.

After a few days of convalescence, Rose left the hospital against medical advice and returned to his unit. With medical officials unsure of his whereabouts, the Army reported to Rose's parents that he been killed, an error which took several days to correct. Rose continued to serve with the 353rd Infantry until the war ended with the Armistice of 11 November 1918. He remained in Germany as part of the Army of Occupation, and was discharged in June 1919.

=== Inter War period ===
After leaving the Army, Rose accepted a position as a traveling salesman with Hendrie & Bolthoff, makers of mining and manufacturing equipment and supplies. His territory included Utah, and he rented a room in Salt Lake City. During a visit to the post quartermaster at nearby Fort Douglas, Rose learned that while the army carried out a post-war reorganization, it was accepting a limited number of lieutenants and captains for return to active duty.

On July 1, 1920, Rose re-joined the peacetime army as a second lieutenant, which was then adjusted to first lieutenant in recognition of his wartime rank. On the following day, he was promoted to captain. Rose served initially with the 20th, 21st, 53rd and 38th Infantry Regiments at Fort Douglas. In 1924, he was the adjutant of the 38th Infantry. While stationed at Fort Douglas, his duties included organizing and overseeing annual Citizens Military Training Camps, which were designed to expose young men without military service to the experiences of Army life.

In 1927, Rose was assigned to Kansas State University as a Reserve Officers' Training Corps instructor, and his additional duties included coaching rifle marksmanship for both the men's and women's teams. In 1931 and 1932, he was serving with the 8th Cavalry Regiment at Fort Bliss, Texas. In the summer of 1932, Rose was one of the Army officers assigned to provide instruction at the annual training encampment of the New Mexico National Guard. Rose was assigned to duty as adjutant of the Corozal Military Post on the Pacific side of the Panama Canal Zone beginning in February 1933. He served with the 6th Cavalry Regiment at Fort Oglethorpe, Georgia, from August 1935 to August 1936.

Rose was promoted to major in 1936. From 1937 to 1939 he was an observer and advisor for the Pennsylvania National Guard. In 1939 Rose was posted to Fort George G. Meade, Maryland, as an instructor at the Third Corps Area Command and Staff School.

In addition to his completion of Officer Candidate School in 1917, Rose graduated from the Infantry Company Officer Course (1926) and the Cavalry Officer Course (1931). He was a 1937 graduate of the Command and General Staff College, and graduated from the Army Industrial College in 1940.

=== World War II ===
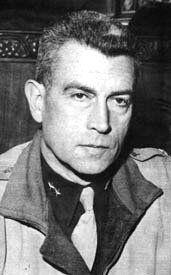
Rose as commander of the 3rd Armored Division in the winter of 1944–1945.

From July 1940 to July 1941 Rose was assigned to Fort Knox, Kentucky and commanded 3rd Battalion, 13th Armored Regiment as a lieutenant colonel. In 1941, he was assigned as executive officer of 1st Armored Brigade, a unit of the newly organized 1st Armored Division. After observing the brigade in action, newspaper reporter Keyes Beech referred to Rose as "probably the best looking man in the army."

In early 1942, Rose was chief of staff for the 2nd Armored Division at Fort Benning, Georgia. He continued as chief of staff after the division arrived in North Africa and was promoted to colonel. When German forces in Tunisia were reduced to combat ineffectiveness, Rose negotiated with their commander, Fritz Krause, on the details of their unconditional surrender.

Promoted to brigadier general, Rose was assigned to lead Combat Command A, 2nd Armored Division, which he commanded in combat throughout fighting in Sicily. When Leroy H. Watson was relieved as commander of the 3rd Armored Division during combat in France in August 1944, Rose succeeded him and was promoted to major general.

After assuming command of the division, Rose became known for his aggressive style of leadership, directing his units from the front rather than a rear command post. Following the 1944 Allied breakthrough on the French coast, the 3rd Armored Division dashed through Belgium and was the first tank unit to enter Germany, and the first to breach the Siegfried line. 3rd Armored helped stem the German offensive in the Ardennes during the Battle of the Bulge, and was the first armor unit to enter Cologne.

== Death ==
On March 30, 1945, Rose was riding with members of his staff at the front of a 3rd Armored column a few miles south of the city of Paderborn in a rural forested area. Receiving reports of units being cut off by German troops, they turned around to investigate, and suddenly began taking small arms, tank, and anti-tank fire. Rose and his staff jumped into a nearby ditch as the tank leading their column took a direct hit and was destroyed. When they realized that they were being surrounded by German tanks of the SS Brigade Westfalen they re-mounted their vehicles and attempted to escape, driving off the road and through a nearby field. As they turned back onto the road they saw it was occupied by more German tanks.

Recognizing that they were about to be cut off, the driver of the lead jeep in Rose's party accelerated and narrowly made it past the German tanks. The driver of Rose's jeep attempted the same maneuver, but one of the German tanks succeeded in cutting them off. Rose and the other passengers dismounted, and the German tank commander opened his hatch and aimed a machine pistol at them. Rose reached towards his holster, either to surrender his pistol or attempt to fight his way out. The German tank commander then opened fire, with 14 rounds hitting Rose, including several in the head. The other passengers from Rose's jeep ran into the woods, hid overnight, and were reunited with friendly units the next morning. They later returned to retrieve Rose's body and the documents he was carrying. Rose was buried at Netherlands American Cemetery and Memorial.

=== Investigation ===
Investigators led by Leon Jaworski later looked into whether Rose's death could be considered a war crime, which might have been the case if Rose and his staff were shot while attempting to surrender. The investigation concluded that the German tank crew probably believed Rose intended to fight, and had no idea they had killed a high-ranking commander, because his body and several sensitive documents he was carrying were not removed from his jeep. Rose was the highest-ranking American killed by enemy fire in the European Theater of Operations during the war. He was also the third and final (as well as the youngest) of three American divisional commanders to be killed by enemy fire during the war. (Note: The other division commanders to be killed were: Brigadier General James E. Wharton, CG 28th Infantry Division (who had only been in command for a few hours), and Major General Edwin D. Patrick, CG 6th Infantry Division.)

== Selected awards and decorations ==
Rose's awards and decorations included:

- Distinguished Service Cross
- Distinguished Service Medal
- Silver Star with two Oak Leaf Clusters
- Legion of Merit with Oak leaf Cluster
- Bronze Star with Oak Leaf Cluster
- Purple Heart with Oak Leaf Cluster
- French Legion of Honor
- French Croix de Guerre with Palm
- Belgian Croix de Guerre with Palm

=== Distinguished Service Cross citation ===
Synopsis: "The President of the United States of America, authorized by Act of Congress July 9, 1918, takes pleasure in presenting the Distinguished Service Cross to Major General Maurice Rose (ASN: 0–8439), United States Army, for extraordinary heroism in connection with military operations against an armed enemy while serving with the 3d Armored Division, in action against enemy forces from 6 to 9 September 1944. Major General Rose's intrepid actions, personal bravery and zealous devotion to duty exemplify the highest traditions of the military forces of the United States and reflect great credit upon himself, the 3d Armored Division, and the United States Army."

Service: Army Division: 3d Armored Division General Orders: Headquarters, First U.S. Army, General Orders No. 86 (November 25, 1944)

== Personal life ==
In 1920, Rose married Venice Hanson (1895–1962) of Salt Lake City. They separated in 1928 or 1929, and divorced in 1931. They were the parents of a son, Maurice "Mike" Rose (1925–2010), a career officer in the United States Marine Corps who attained the rank of colonel and was a veteran of World War II, the Korean War, and the Vietnam War. In 1934, Rose married Virginia Barringer (1912–1997). They were the parents of a son, Maurice Roderick "Reece" Rose (1941–2020), who spent his career in law enforcement, including service as chief of police for the San Antonio International Airport.

== Legacy ==
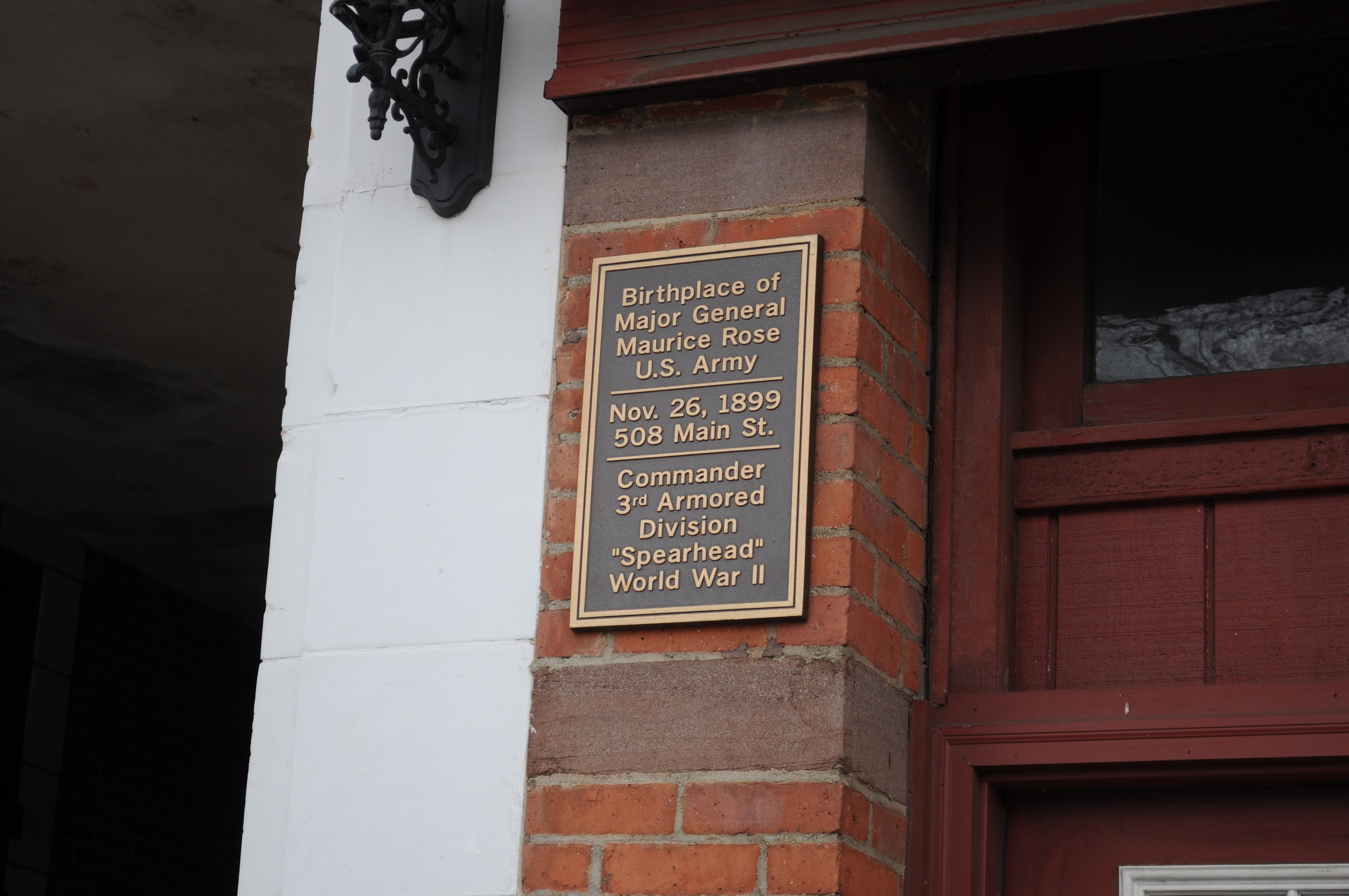
Plaque marking Rose's birthplace. The Rose home is part of the Main Street Historic District, which is listed on the National Register of Historic Places

J. Lawton Collins, Rose's superior as commander of the VII Corps, regarded Rose "as the top notch division commander in the business at the time of his death." However, Rose never gained the prominence of many of his contemporaries, for reasons including the fact that he did not survive the war, and as an intensely private man, he rarely if ever sought personal publicity.

His biographers, Steven L. Ossad and Don R. Marsh, referred to Rose as "World War II's Greatest Forgotten Commander". Andy Rooney, a World War II war correspondent and later 60 Minutes commentator, wrote in his book My War:

Maj. Gen. Maurice Rose, who had been with the Second Armored Division at Saint-Lô, was now the commander of the Third Armored and he may have been the best tank commander of the war. He was a leader down where they fight. Not all great generals were recognized. Maurice Rose was a great one and had a good reputation among the people who knew what was going on, but his name was not in the headlines as Patton's so often was. Rose led from the front of his armored division.

Rose's birthplace in Middletown, Connecticut is marked with a plaque as part of the city's Main Street Historic District, which is listed on the National Register of Historic Places. The Armed Forces Reserve Center in Middletown is also named for Rose, as is the Connecticut Route 9 bridge over Union Street in Middletown.

Rose Terrace and Rose Hall at Fort Knox were named for Rose. The army transport USAT General Maurice Rose, the Rose Medical Center in Denver, Colorado, and the primary school in Margraten, Netherlands were named in his honor. In addition, the now-closed Maurice Rose Army Airfield near Frankfurt, Germany and Rose Barracks near Vilseck, Germany were also named for him.

The 1951 film The Tanks Are Coming depicts five tanks of the 3rd Armored Division as they advance across France into Germany during World War II. The commanding general of the division is not named, but is presumed to be Rose based on the film's timeline and the fact that the character was portrayed by Roy Roberts, an actor who physically resembled Rose.

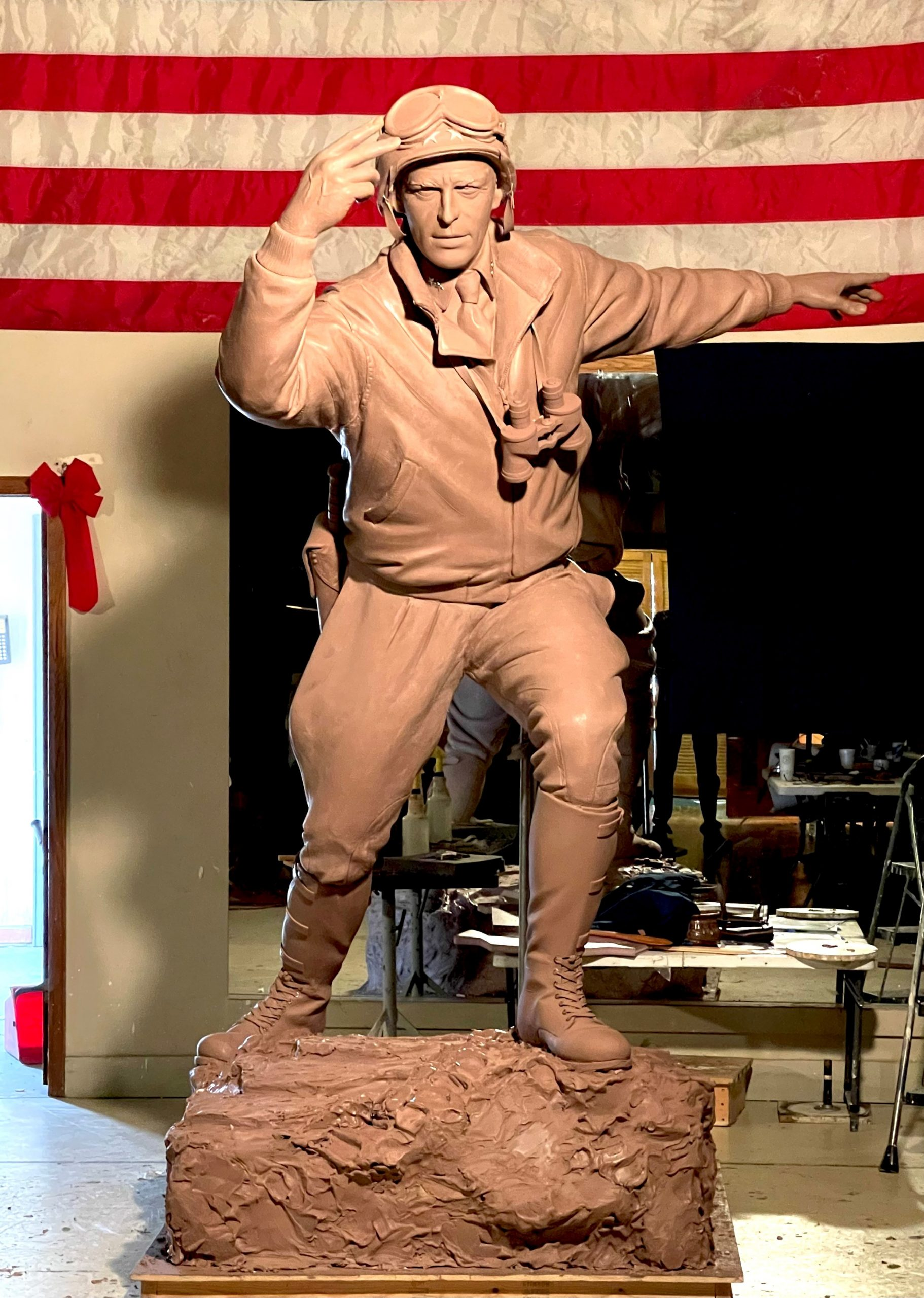
Clay miniature of Rose sculpture in Denver

A statue of Rose by George Lundeen was placed in Denver's Lincoln Veterans Memorial Park in 2023.

== Bibliography ==
- Ossad, Stephen L.; Marsh, Don R. Marsh (2003). Major General Maurice Rose: World War II's Greatest Forgotten Commander. Lanham, MD: Taylor Trade Publishing. ISBN 978-0-87833-308-0.
- Bolger, Daniel P. (2020). The Panzer Killers: The Untold Story of a Fighting General and his Spearhead Tank Division's Charge Into the Third Reich. New York, NY: Dutton Caliber. ISBN 978-0-59318-371-7.
- Fogel, Marshall (2018). The Story of Major General Maurice Rose: The Most Decorated Battle Tank Commander In U.S. Military History. Aurora, CO: Frederic Printing. ISBN 978-0-692-18578-0.

Military offices
Preceded by Leroy H. Watson	Commanding General 3rd Armored Division; 1944–1945	Succeeded by Doyle O. Hickey
