= Old Middletown Post Office =

- U.S. Post Office
- U.S. National Register of Historic Places
- U.S. Historic district – Contributing property
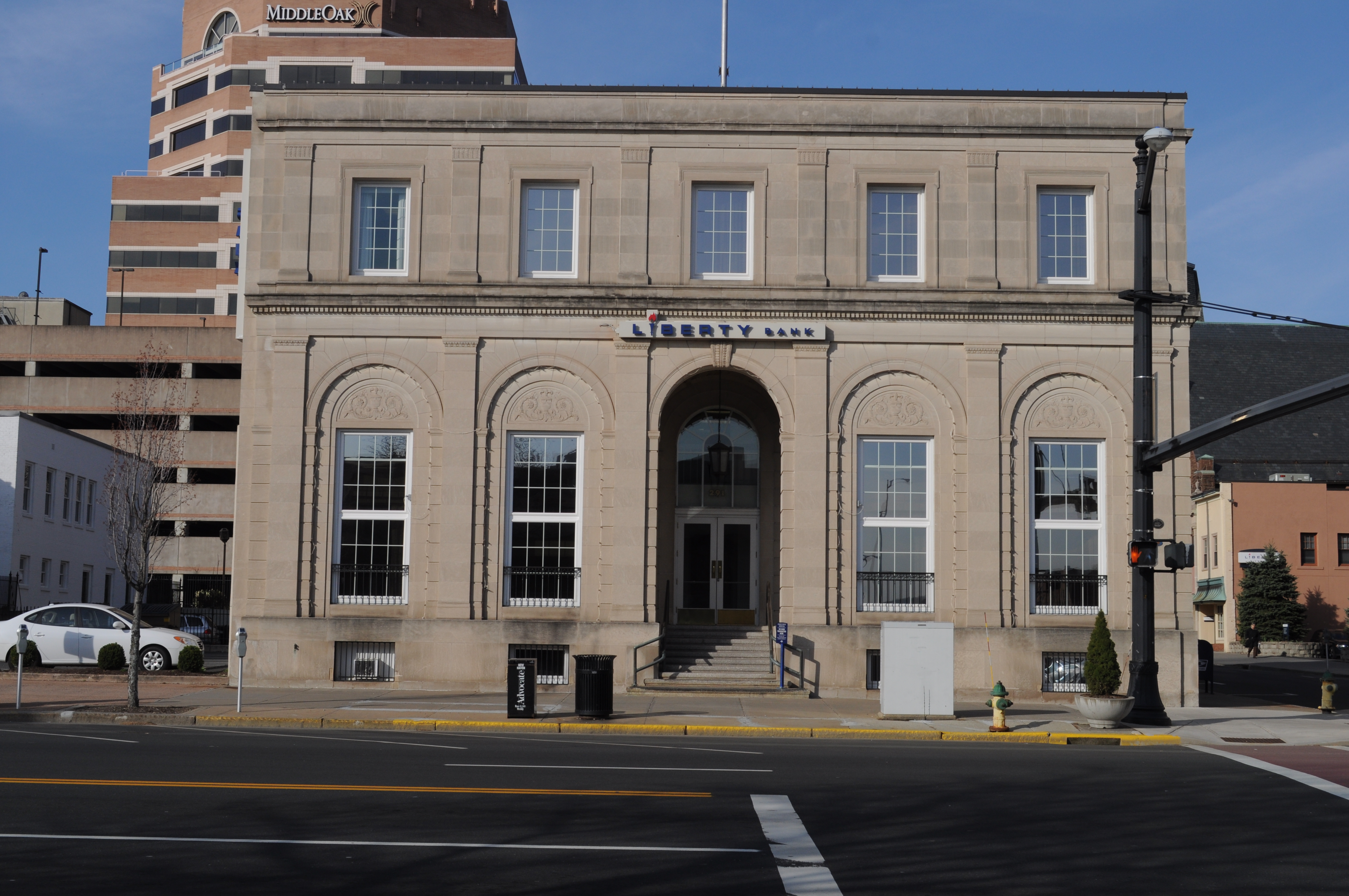
- The Old Middletown Post Office in 2012, with the Middlesex Corporate Center in the background

- Location within Connecticut Location within the United States
- Location: 291 Main Street, Middletown, Connecticut
- Coordinates: 41°33′36″N 72°39′1″W
- Area: 0.1 acres (0.040 ha)
- Built: 1916
- Architect: Office of the Supervising Architect under James A. Wetmore
- Architectural style: Late 19th and 20th Century Revivals, Second Renaissance Revival
- Part of: Main Street Historic District (ID83001275)
- NRHP reference No.: 82004338

Significant dates
- Added to NRHP: April 12, 1982
- Designated CP: June 30, 1983

The Old Middletown Post Office, in Middletown, Connecticut, also known as the U.S. Post Office, was built in 1916. It was listed on the National Register of Historic Places (NRHP) in 1982. The building is also on the NRHP as a contributing property of the Main Street Historic District.

== History ==
In 1911, the United States Government decided to build a new post office facility in Middletown. Preparations for construction began shortly thereafter. Together these three buildings give this section of the central business district a solid and classical look. The selection of the building's location was a topic of much controversy. The government finally chose this location, federally owned since 1841, in the center of Middletown's commercial and financial district. It is located on the southwest corner of Court and Main Streets facing the Connecticut River. Across Court Street to the north is the massive Liberty Bank building and to its south across a parking lot; is the Bank of America building.

Contemporary sources indicate that the new post office was a source of civic pride for the citizens of Middletown. The old post office ceased operation in 1977, ending 136 years of federal use of that site. Liberty Bank uses this building as office space and keeps the building in good condition.

It was listed on the National Register of Historic Places (NRHP) on April 12, 1982. The building is also on the NRHP as a contributing property of the Main Street Historic District.

== Architecture ==
This is a fine, two-story example of the Renaissance Revival style. The building is made of limestone using a structural system of load bearing masonry. Its facade of smooth limestone distinguished it in a city center where brick and Portland brownstone were the common building materials. The classical facade displays a two-story arrangement of arched windows and pilasters supporting an elaborate entablature. The interior features a large two-story open lobby. It was designed by the Office of the Supervising Architect under James A. Wetmore and built by W. H. Frissell & Co. of New York City.

== See also ==
- National Register of Historic Places listings in Middletown, Connecticut
- List of United States post offices
