= Middlesex Corporate Center =

Skyscraper in Middletown, CT

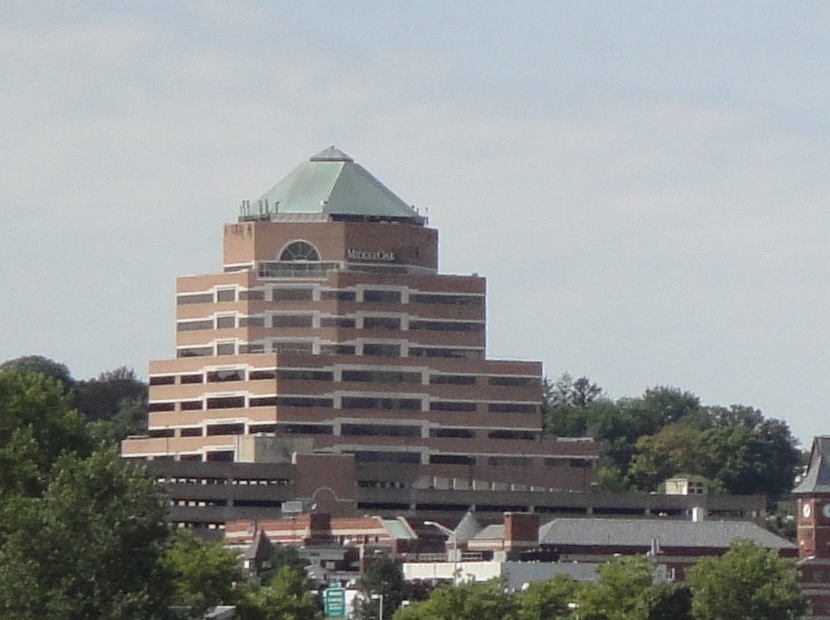
- 213 Court Street Middletown CT river skyline (cropped) The Middlesex Corporate Center in 2009

- Location within Connecticut Middlesex Corporate Center (the United States)

General information
- Status: Completed
- Type: Office
- Architectural style: Postmodern
- Location: 213 Court Street, Middletown, Connecticut, United States
- Coordinates: 41°33′34.15″N 72°39′03.88″W
- Completed: 1989

Height
- Roof: 211 ft (64 m)

Technical details
- Floor count: 12

The Middlesex Corporate Center is a 211 ft (64 m) tall postmodern style office building located on 213 Court Street in Downtown Middletown, Connecticut. The building has 12 floors and was built in 1989. As of February 2026, it is the tallest building in Middletown. Notable tenants include Fuchs Financial, Tighe & Bond, and the United States Department of Commerce.

Amenities include a parking garage, a golf simulator, and a fitness center. In 2026, a cafe opened on the ground floor of the building.

In 2013, the Midfield Corporation sold the building to the 213 Court Street Realty Trust Company for $19.5 million dollars. The price is approximately $123 dollars per sq ft.

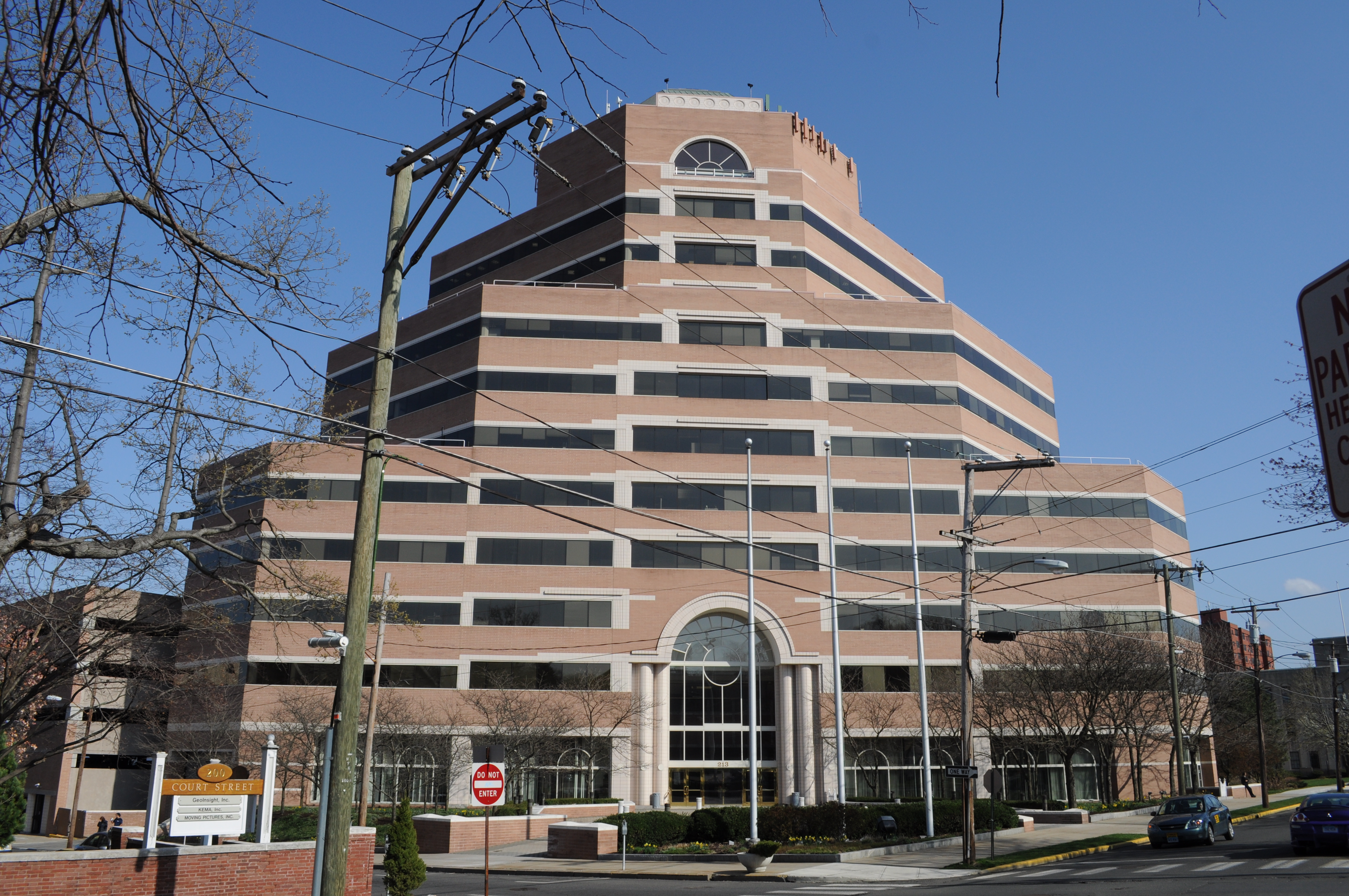
The Middlesex Corporate Center in 2012

== See also ==
- List of tallest buildings in Connecticut
- Arrigoni Bridge
- Van Vleck Observatory
- Russell Library (Middletown, Connecticut)
- Middlesex Hospital (Connecticut)
- Connecticut Valley Hospital
- Old Middletown Post Office
- St. Mary of Czestochowa Parish (Middletown, Connecticut)
