= Farmers and Mechanics Bank (Middletown, Connecticut) =

- Main Street Historic District
- U.S. Historic district – Contributing property
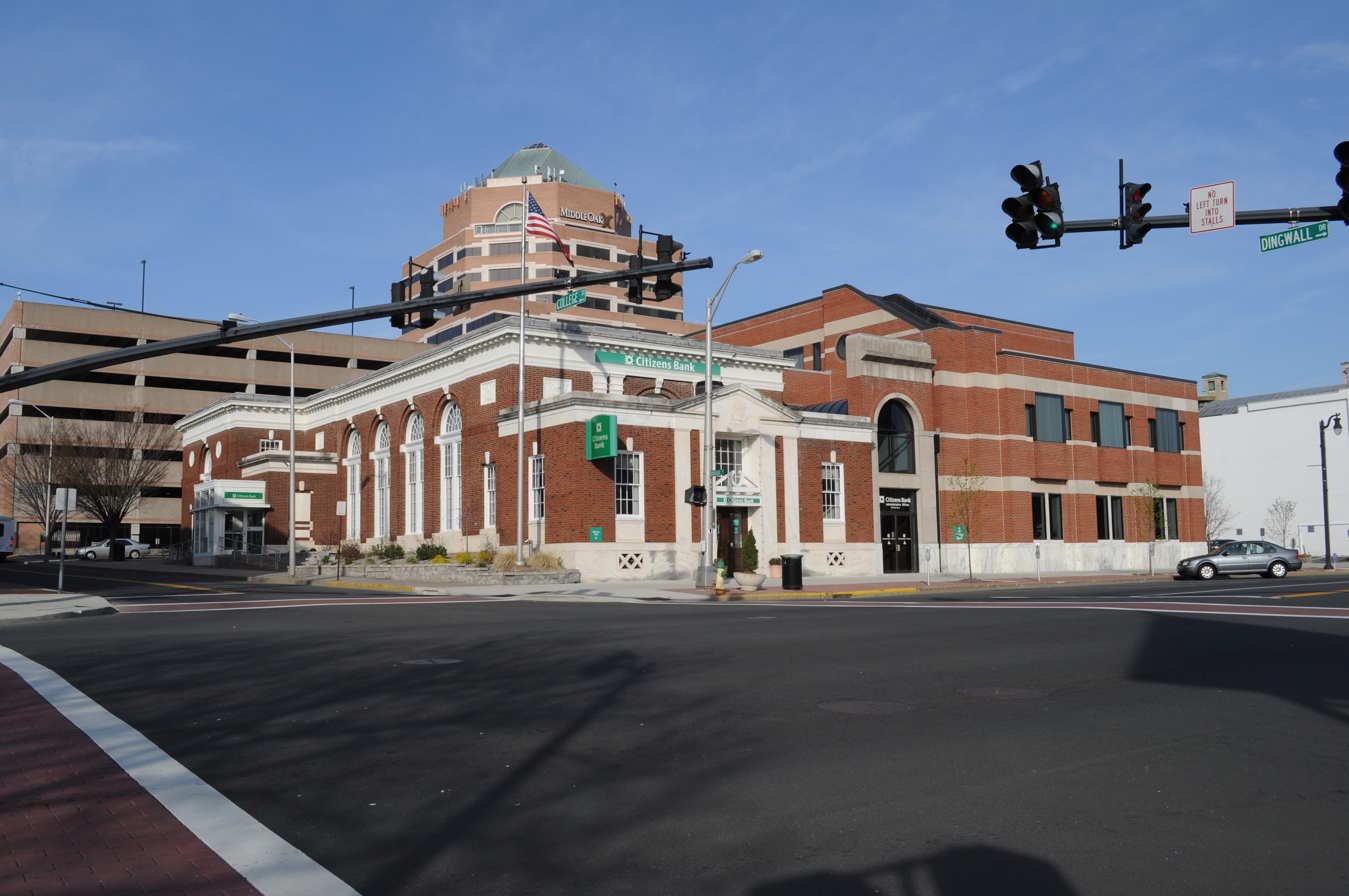
- Location: 225 Main Street, Middletown, Connecticut
- Built: 1920
- Part of: Main Street Historic District (Middletown, Connecticut) (ID83001275)
- Designated CP: June 30, 1983

The Farmers and Mechanics Bank of Middletown, Connecticut is a former bank that operated from 1858 to 1996, when it was incorporated into Citizens Bank of Connecticut.

Its main office was long located at 225 Main Street in Middletown, at the intersection of Main and College Streets. The bank building was built in 1920.

The bank was founded in 1858; medical Dr. William B. Casey was its first president. It served workers at nearby brownstone quarries, including many Irish immigrants.

The building is a contributing building in the National Register of Historic Places-listed Main Street Historic District.
