= Middletown South Green Historic District =

Historic district in Connecticut, United States

- U.S. National Register of Historic Places
- U.S. Historic district
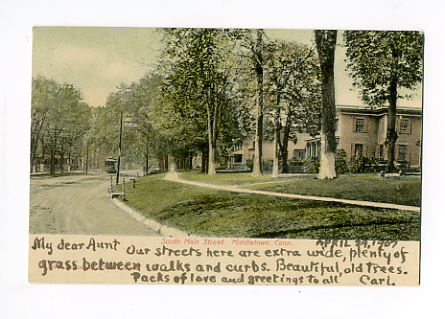
- From a 1907 postcard: "Our streets here are extra wide, plenty of grass between walks and curbs. Beautiful old trees. Packs of love and greetings to all, Carl"

- Location within Connecticut Location within the United States
- Location: Union Park Area, on South Main, Crescent, Pleasant, and Church Streets, Middletown, Connecticut
- Coordinates: 41.556°N 72.649°W
- Area: 90 acres (36 ha)
- Architect: Multiple
- Architectural style: Second Empire, Italianate, and Gothic Revival
- NRHP reference No.: 75001922
- Added to NRHP: August 12, 1975

Located in Middletown, Connecticut, the Middletown South Green Historic District was created to preserved the historic character of the city's South Green and the historic buildings that surround it. It is a 90-acre (36 ha) historic district that includes a concentration of predominantly residential high-quality architecture from the late 19th century. It was listed on the National Register of Historic Places in 1975.

== Description and history ==
The historic district is centered on Union Park, an open green area marking the southernmost extent of Middletown's commercial business district. It includes properties set on three sides (north, south, and west) of the green, as well as properties on Crescent Street and a short stretch of South Main Street. Most of these are houses that were built in the latter third of the 19th century, although the area also includes two of the city's oldest surviving residences. One property, the Caleb Fuller House at the corner of Main and Church streets, is also included in the Metro South Historic District

The most common architectural styles seen in the district are the Italianate and Second Empire styles, reflective of the city's growth between the 1860s and 1880s. Both of the district's two churches, the Methodist and South Congregational, are Gothic Revival in style, although the former was built in the 1920s and the latter in the 1860s. Crescent Street includes a number of fine Queen Anne Victorians. One of the older houses, the Mather-Johnson House, is a fine example of Federal period architecture, which has been owned and occupied by two of Middletown's mayors.

== South Green Historic District inventory ==
Based on the NRHP nomination inventory except as explicitly noted:

- 14 Church Street (now 14 Old Church Street), Doolittle's Funeral Home, Queen Anne with hexagonal turret, 1890s, critical contributing property
- (unnumbered) Church Street (now 24 Old Church Street), Methodist Parish House, Second Empire, 1880s (or 1868-1869), critical contributing property
- First United Methodist Church (no address, on Church Street, now Old Church Street), 1936 (or 1930-1931), critical contributing property
- (unnumbered) Church Street (now 8 Broad Street, corner of Church), Synagogue (Congregation Adath Israel), brick blocklike structure with low dome, non-essential contributing property
- 38 South Main Street (now 11 South Main Street), 1811–1813, Federal style with Greek Revival embellishments, Mather-Douglas House (or Mather-Douglas-Santangelo House), critical contributing property
- 29 South Main Street, 1880–1890, Italianate, critical contributing property
- 27 South Main Street, 1880–1890, Italianate with belvedere, contributing property
- 65 South Main Street, 1880–1890, Italianate, critical contributing property
- 63 South Main Street, 1880–1890, Italianate with wrought iron porch, critical contributing property
- 61 South Main Street, 1880–1890, Italianate, contributing property
- 40 South Main Street, 1880–1890, plain, multi-gabled rambling house, contributing property
- 36 South Main Street, 1790–1800, Michael's Beauty Salon, 3-bay, 5 course brick band, box cornice, gable roof, contributing property
- 34 & 32 South Main Street, 1880–1890, double bay projections, pediment dormers, large porch, contributing property
- 22 South Main Street, D'Angelo's Funeral Home, early 1900s (1902), 5-bay, gambrel roof house with Georgian symmetry, contributing property
- 33 Pleasant Street, White-Stoddard House, 1870-1880 (1870), Second Empire, brick, critical contributing property. Now Masonic Temple Building.
- 27 Pleasant Street, Hayes-Chaffe House, 1870-1880 (1872-1873), Second Empire, critical contributing property
- 21 Pleasant Street, Joseph Rockwell House or Rockwell-Sumner House, 1750, 5-bay, double overhang, Colonial Georgian, critical contributing property
- 19 & 17 Pleasant Street (now 15 Pleasant Street), Smith-Stiles House, 1870-1880 (1870-1871), Second Empire, double house, critical contributing property
- (no number) Pleasant Street (or 9 Pleasant Street), South Congregational Church, 1868, Gothic Revival with spire, critical contributing property
- 57-83 Main Street Extension, 1870–1880, Second Empire Apartment House, critical contributing property
- 55 Crescent Street, Wilcox-Meech House, 1880-1890 (1871), Italianate, 3-story brick with belvedere, critical contributing property
- 49 Crescent Street, George R. Finley House, 1880-1890 (1872-1873), Italianate with mansard roof, critical contributing property
- 43 Crescent Street, 1890–1900, 2 story, 3-bay with gable front, side bay projection, contributing property
- 41 Crescent Street, 1880–1890, gingerbread, stick style Victorian, critical contributing property
- 33 Crescent Street, 1890–1900, very plain Gothic, contributing property
- 31 & 29 Crescent Street, 1870–1880, large scale, Second Empire, contributing property
- 15 Crescent Street, 1870-1880 (1877), Queen Anne, stick style with barge board and turret, contributing property
- 11 Crescent Street, 1900, large rambling multi-gable house, contributing property
- 4 Crescent Street, 1880–1890, Queen Anne, critical contributing property
- 8 Crescent Street, 1880–1890, Victorian stick style, critical contributing property

== Gallery ==
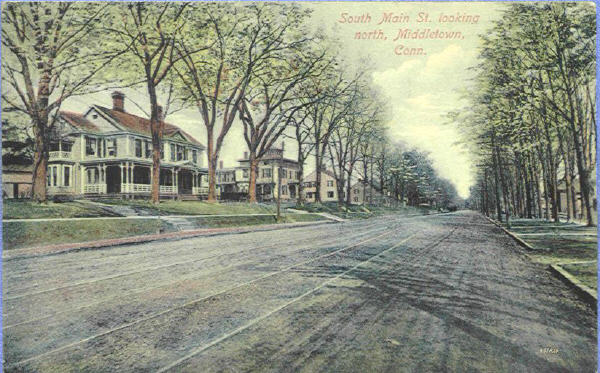
South Main St., ca. 1909

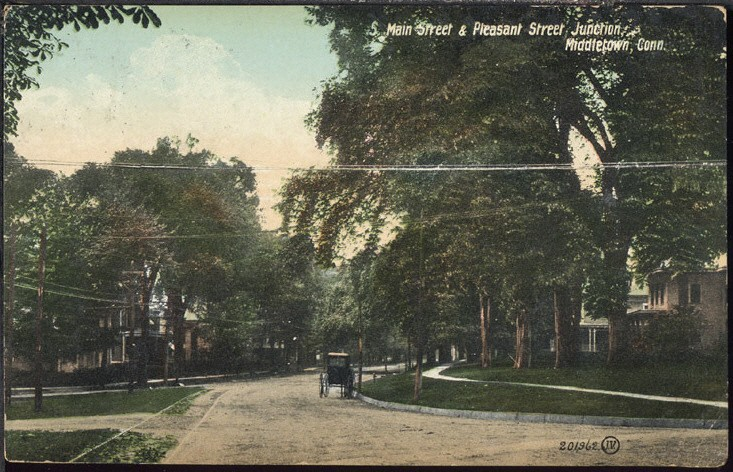
South Main & Pleasant Sts., ca. 1910

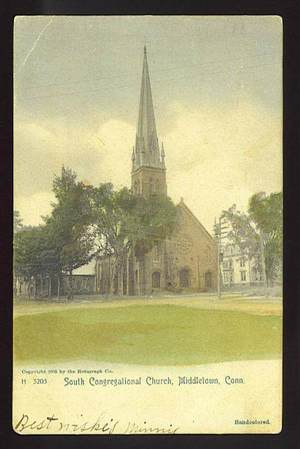
South Congregational Church ca. 1904

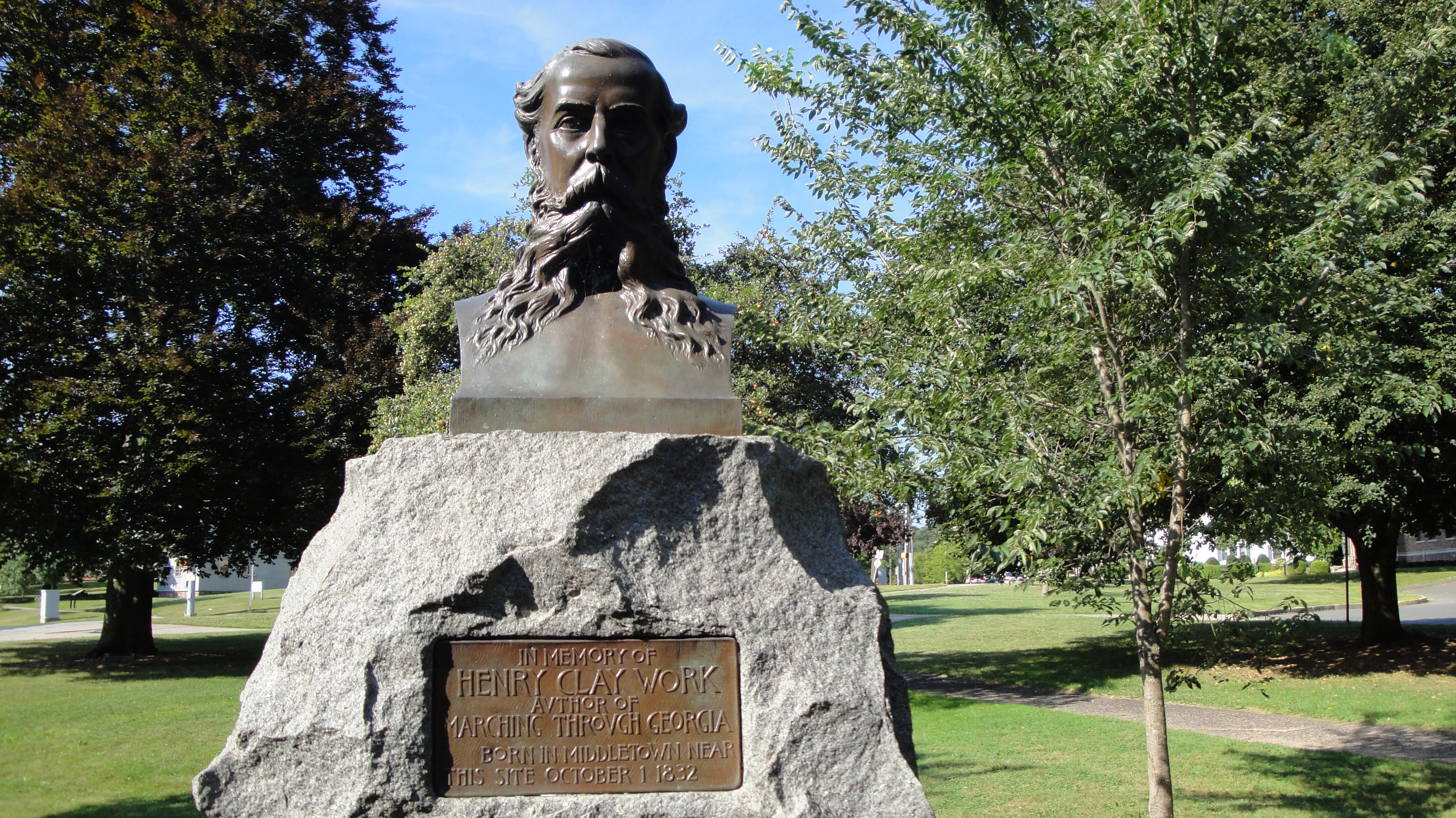
Bust of Henry Clay Work, South Green / Union Park

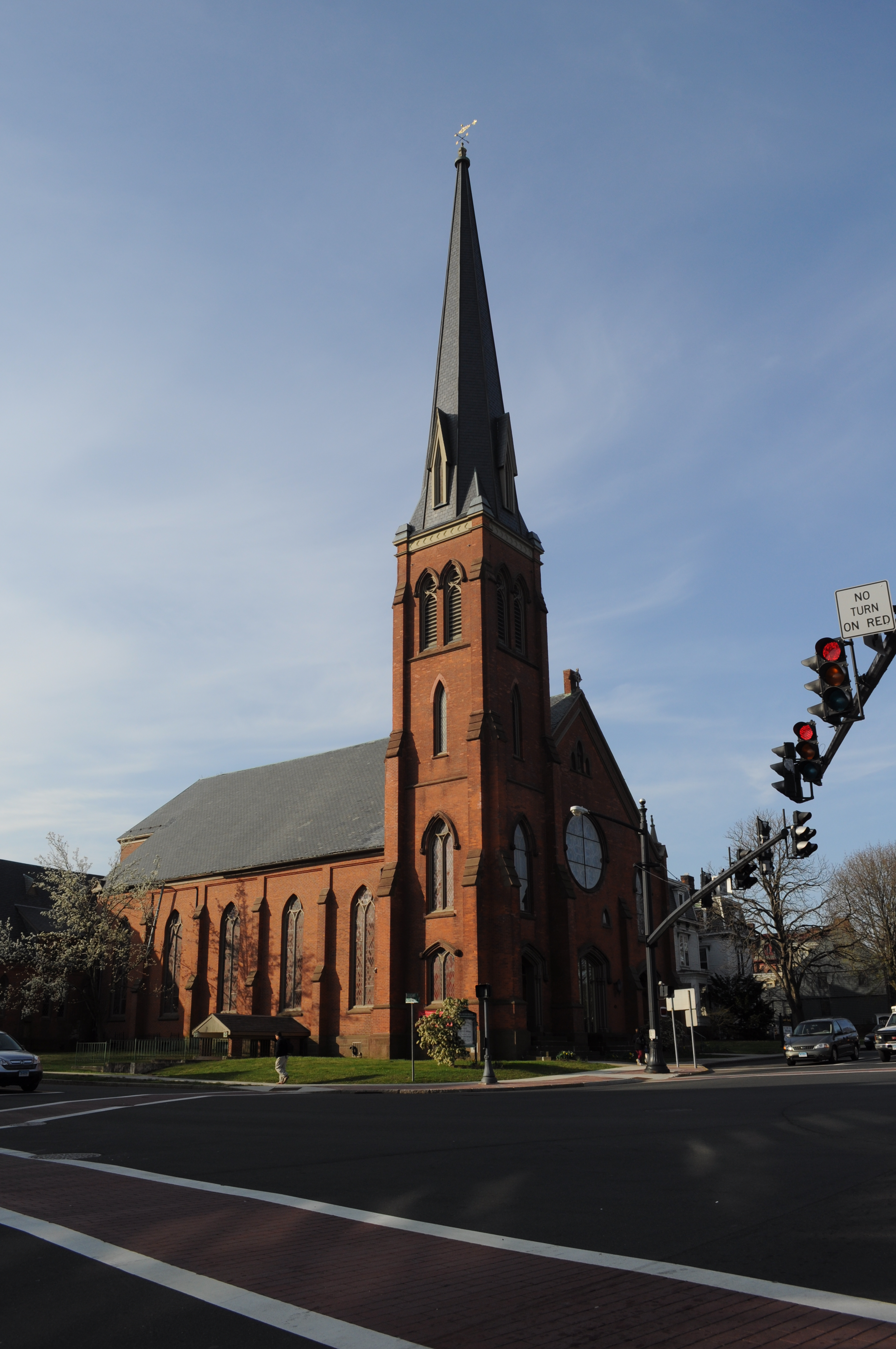
South Congregational Church

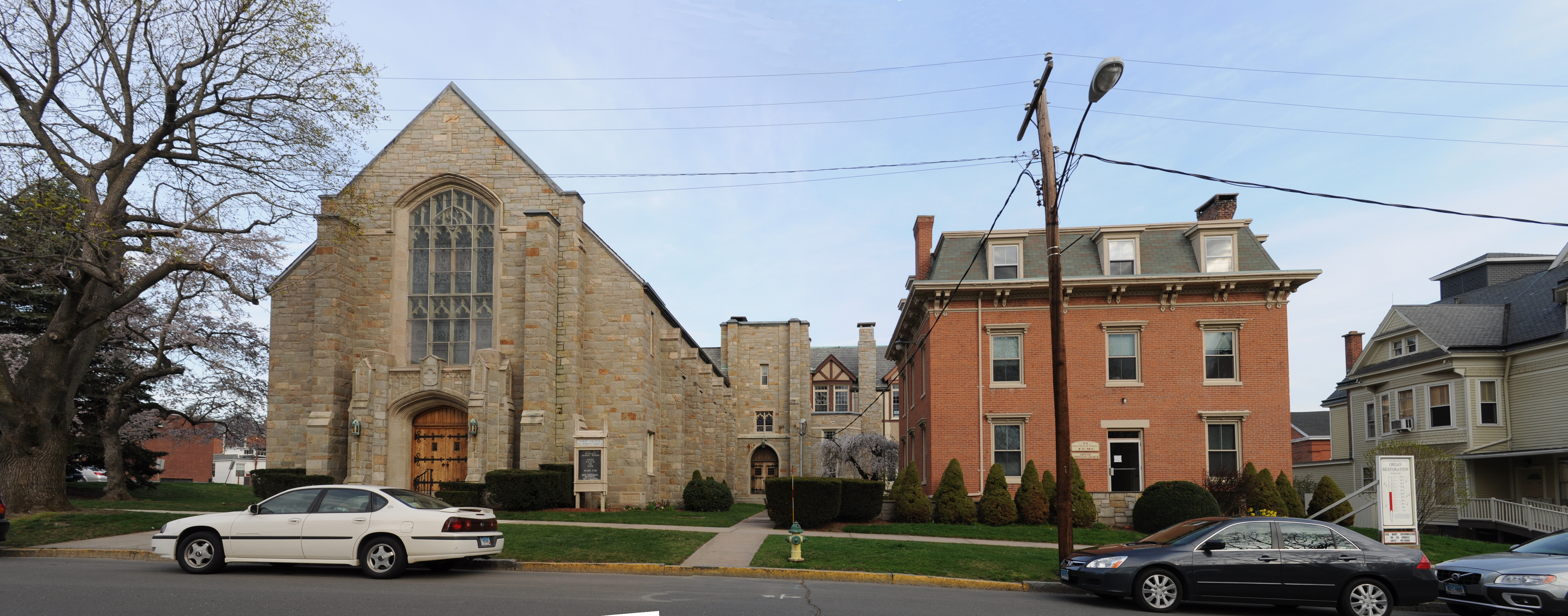
First United Methodist Church and parish house, on what is now Old Church Street, 2012

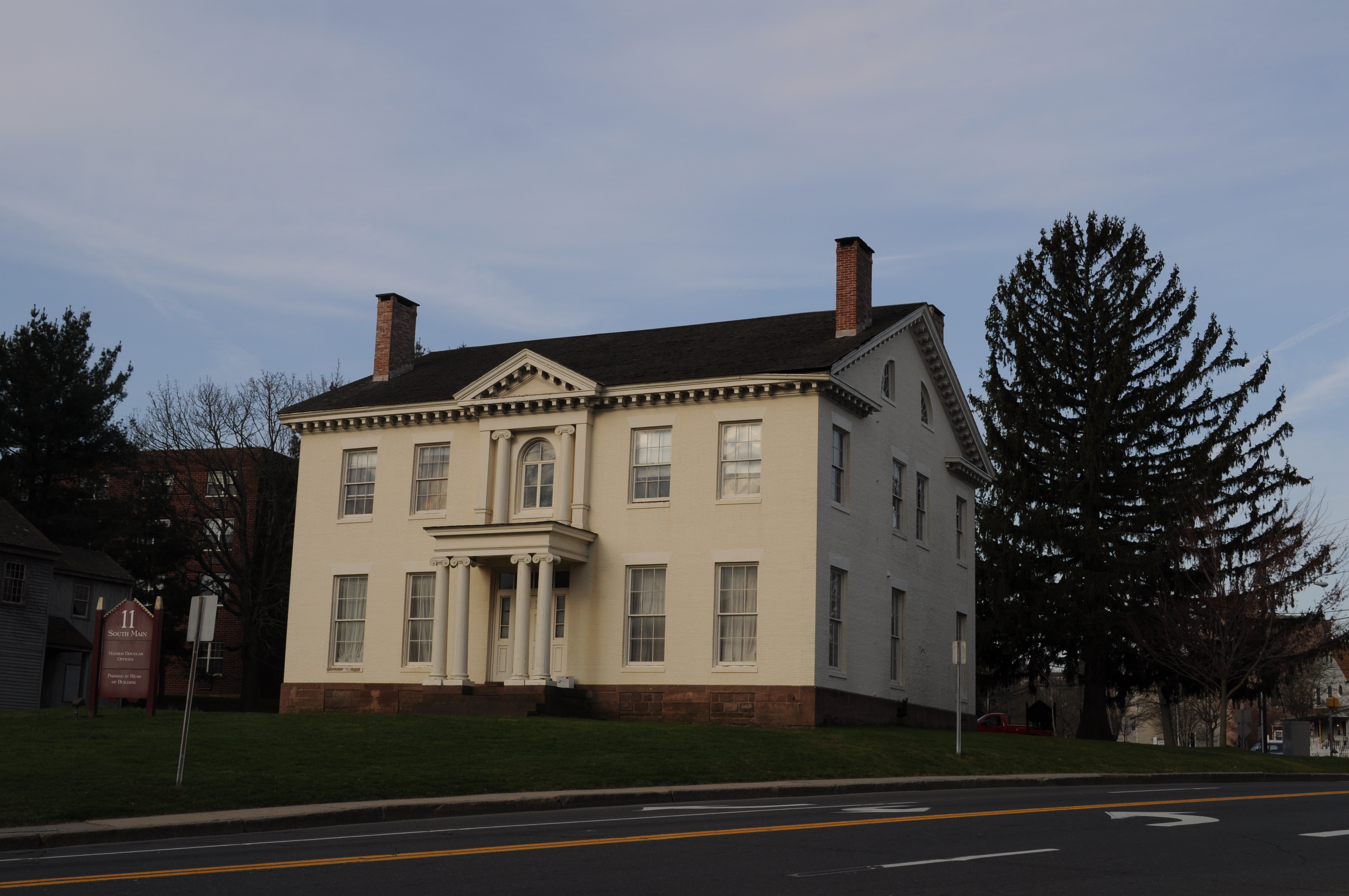
Mather-Douglas House, 2012

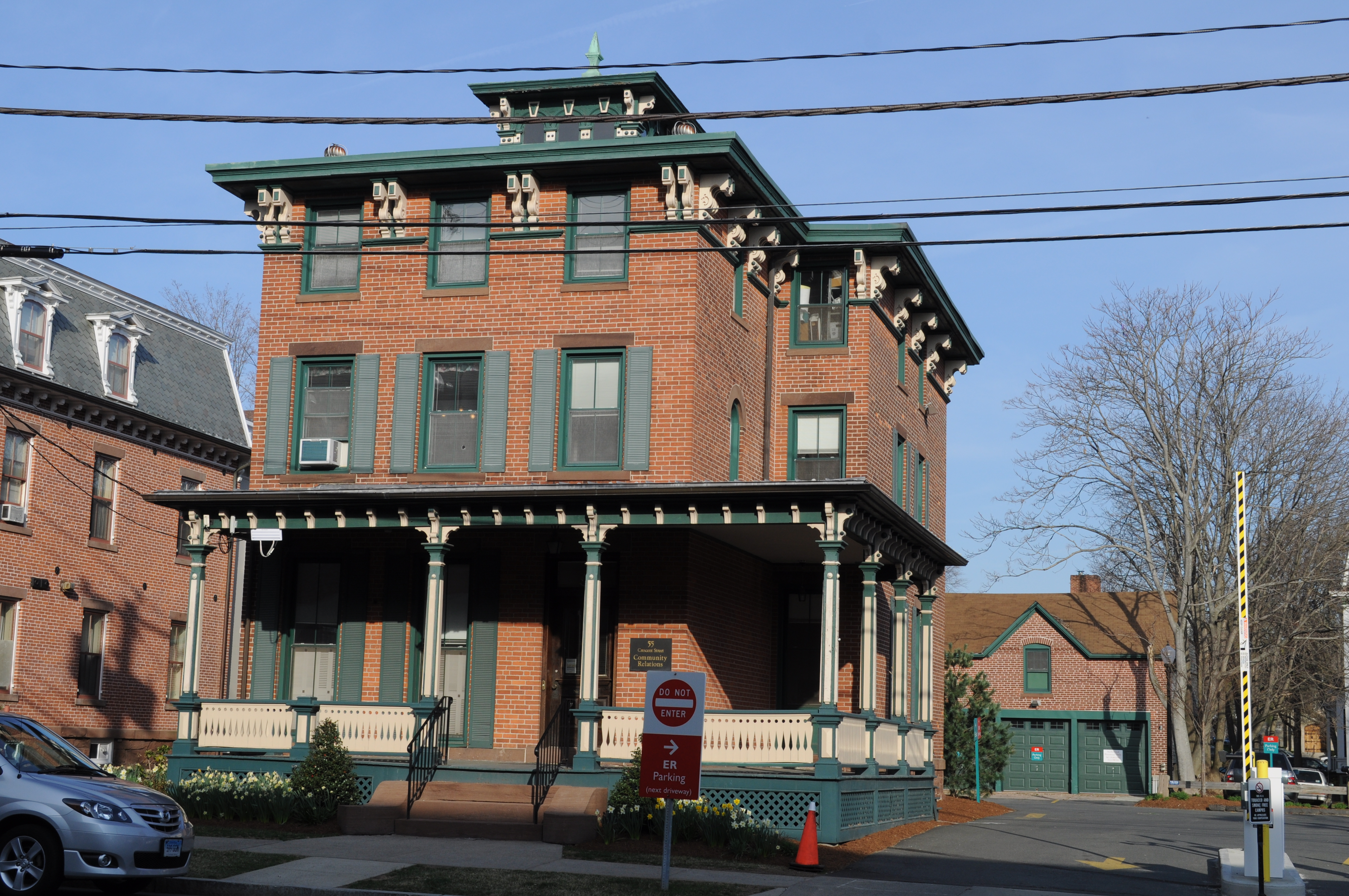
55 Crescent Street, 2012. The belvedere can be seen on the roof.

== See also ==
- National Register of Historic Places listings in Middletown, Connecticut
