= Metro South Historic District =

Historic district in Connecticut, United States

- U.S. National Register of Historic Places
- U.S. Historic district
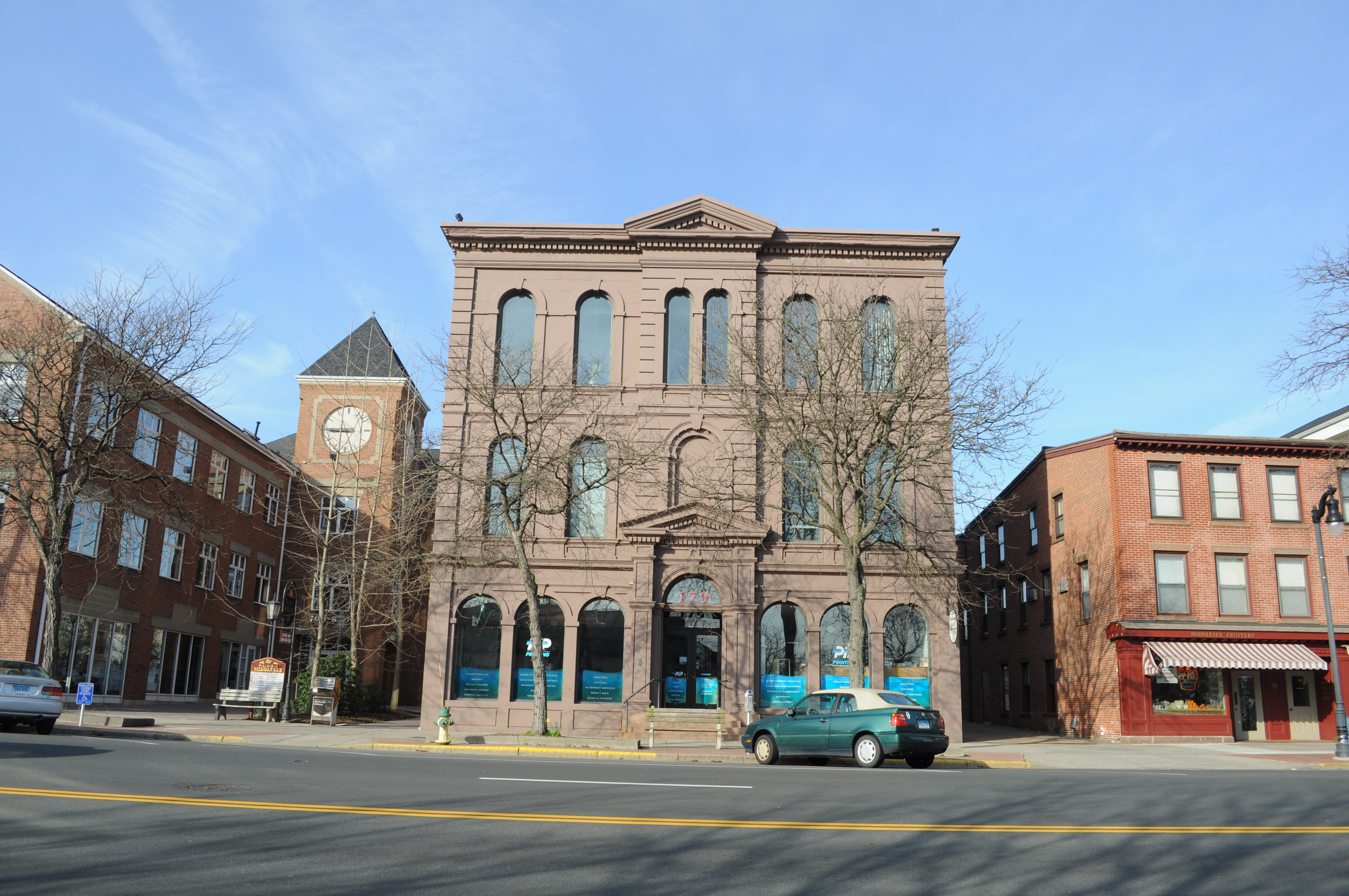
- 179 Main Street

- Location within Connecticut Location within the United States
- Location: Main and College Streets, Middletown, Connecticut
- Coordinates: 41°33′27″N 72°38′49″W
- Area: 9 acres (3.6 ha)
- Architect: Kimball, Francis; Multiple
- Architectural style: Greek Revival, Renaissance, and Federal
- NRHP reference No.: 80004064
- Added to NRHP: January 24, 1980

The Metro South Historic District encompasses a portion of the downtown area of Middletown, Connecticut. Extending south from Main and College Streets for two blocks, this area was developed in the 19th century, and contains a diversity of well-preserved architecture from that period, some with association to locally important individuals. It was listed on the National Register of Historic Places in 1980.

== Description and history ==
The district includes 15 contributing buildings and one non-contributing building and extends on the west side of Main Street from Church Street (just north of the South Green) to College Street. Two buildings, the armory and a c. 1750s colonial house, are located on the east side of Main Street. The contributing buildings include two Greek Revival churches: a Baptist church (1842) and Universalist Church (1839). One of the buildings, the Middlesex Opera House was designed by nationally known architect Francis Kimball.

The southern part of Middletown's Main Street was predominantly residential into the 19th century, and still includes a few houses from the colonial and Federal periods. In the late 19th century, the commercial portion of the downtown began to extend southward, as exemplified by the construction of the opera house 1892 and the armoury in 1921. Other buildings of note from that period are the 1896 firehouse, and the 1867 Middlesex Assurance Company building at 179 Main Street, which is one of the district's most architecturally sophisticated buildings.

== List of contributing buildings ==
- Caleb Fuller House (1771, also included in Middletown South Green Historic District)
- Rev. John Cookson House (1837)
- Southmayd House (1747)
- First Baptist Church (1842)
- Gen. Mansfield House (1810, houses the Middlesex Historical Society)
- Hall House (1796)
- 109-111 College Street (1926, building that used to serve as entrance for Middlesex Theater)
- Middlesex Theater/Opera House (1892)
- Former firehouse (1896)
- G.A. Chafee Building (1870)
- Universalist Church (1839)
- 191-195 Main Street (1835)
- Middlesex Assurance Co.
- State Armory (1921), including John Watkinson House (1810)
- Charles Boardman House (1750s)

== See also ==
- National Register of Historic Places listings in Middletown, Connecticut
