= Branford =

Branford may refer to:

- Branford Boase Award, British literary award
- Branford Marsalis Quartet, an American jazz band
- Operation Branford, a British raid conducted in 1942 during WW2

== Places ==
- Branford, Connecticut, a town in the United States
  - Branford Center, Connecticut, a neighborhood in Branford, Connecticut
  - Branford Connector, a state road in Branford, Connecticut
  - Branford Hall Career Institute, a private career college in Branford, Connecticut
  - Branford High School (Connecticut), a school district in Branford, Connecticut
  - Branford Land Trust, an organization in Branford, Connecticut
  - Branford Point Historic District, a historical district in Branford, Connecticut
  - Branford station, a railroad station in Branford
  - Branford Town Hall, the town hall in Branford, Connecticut
- North Branford, Connecticut, a town in New Haven, Connecticut
  - North Branford Center Historic District, historic district in North Branford, Connecticut
  - North Branford High School, school district in North Branford, Connecticut
  - Branford Steam Railroad, a railroad in North Branford, Connecticut
- Branford, Florida, a town in the United States
  - Branford High School (Florida), the only public high school in Branford, Florida
- Branford College, a residential college at Yale University
- Branford House, a summer home in Groton, Connecticut
- Branford-Horry House, a house in Charleston, South Carolina
- Branford Price Millar Library, a University library in Portland, Oregon

== People ==
=== Given name ===
- Branford Clarke (1885–1947), English evangelical preacher
- Branford Marsalis (born 1960), American jazz musician
- Branford Taitt (1938–2013), Barbadian politician

=== Middle name ===
- William Shubrick (1790–1874), American Navy officer

=== Surname ===
- Branford (surname)

== Fictional characters ==
- Terra Branford, the protagonist from Final Fantasy VI

== See also ==
- Brantford (disambiguation)
