= Connecticut Route 100 =

State highway in New Haven County, Connecticut, US

Route 100
- Map of New Haven County in southern Connecticut with Route 100 highlighted in red

Route information
- Maintained by CTDOT
- Length: 4.40 mi (7.08 km)
- Existed: 1935–present

Major junctions
- South end: US 1 in East Haven
- I-95 in East Haven
- North end: Route 80 in East Haven

Location
- Country: United States
- State: Connecticut
- Counties: New Haven

Highway system
- Connecticut State Highway System; Interstate; US; State; SSR; SR; Scenic
← Route 99	→ Route 101

Route 100 is a United States state highway in Connecticut that connects the town center of East Haven with the Foxon community in the northern part of town.

== Route description ==
Route 100 lies wholly within the town of East Haven. It begins at US 1 in the eastern part of town and heads west through the town center along Main Street before turning north along North High Street. It crosses over US 1 without a direct connection and intersects Interstate 95 (I-95) before continuing north to end at Route 80 in the Foxon section of town. The interchange with I-95 is a partial one and allows direct access to northbound and from southbound I-95 only. Traffic heading for southbound I-95 is directed to use Kimberly Avenue, which connects to US 1. This portion of Kimberly Avenue is an unsigned state road with designation State Road 735.

== History ==
Modern Route 100 was established in 1935, running approximately from the current location of the intersection of US 1 and the Amtrak railroad to Route 80. Since then, the southern terminus has been moved several times. In 1943, it was extended south along Thompson Avenue (formers SR 558) to the entrance of Tweed-New Haven Airport. In 1962, the southern end of Route 100 was relocated, taking over part of Route 142 to Silver Sands Road, ending at a reconfigured Route 142, which was changed to continue west along Silver Sands Road and modern Route 337. This configuration was reversed in 1969, as the section of Route 100 south of Main Street was reassigned back to Route 142. The south end was shifted further east in 1993 to end at US 1 near the Branford town line.

== Junction list ==
The entire route is in East Haven, New Haven County.

mi	km	Destinations	Notes
0.00	0.00	US 1 – New Haven, Branford	Southern terminus
0.32	0.51	Route 142 – East Haven, Short Beach	
0.86	1.38	To US 1	Access via SSR 735
0.94	1.51	I-95 north – New London	Exit 50 on I-95 south
4.40	7.08	Route 80 – New Haven, North Branford	Northern terminus
1.000 mi = 1.609 km; 1.000 km = 0.621 mi
