= Connecticut Route 337 =

State highway in New Haven County, Connecticut, US

Route 337
- Map of New Haven County in southern Connecticut with Route 337 highlighted in red

Route information
- Maintained by CTDOT
- Length: 4.91 mi (7.90 km)
- Existed: 1987–present

Major junctions
- West end: I-95 / US 1 in New Haven
- East end: Route 142 in East Haven

Location
- Country: United States
- State: Connecticut
- Counties: New Haven

Highway system
- Connecticut State Highway System; Interstate; US; State; SSR; SR; Scenic
← Route 334	→ Route 341

Route 337 is a state highway in southern Connecticut running for 4.91 miles (7.90 km) from Interstate 95 (I-95) in New Haven to Route 142 in East Haven. The road serves Tweed-New Haven Airport, and is also the main thoroughfare for the East Shore neighborhood of New Haven and the village of Momauguin in East Haven.

== Route description ==
Route 337 begins as Townsend Avenue at an intersection with U.S. Route 1 (US 1) in the Annex section of New Haven. It immediately crosses over I-95 and heads south towards the Morris Cove neighborhood, passing near Tweed-New Haven Airport and providing access to Lighthouse Point Park. After crossing Morris Creek into the Momauguin section of the town of East Haven, it becomes South End Road then turns east along Silver Sands Road after 0.2 miles (0.32 km). Route 337 continues through the Momauguin area and then turns north along Coe Avenue for another 0.4 miles (0.64 km) to end at an intersection with Route 142 south of the town center.

== History ==
The road serving Morris Cove and the Annex neighborhoods of New Haven were town-maintained until the beginning of 1963, where the changes mandated by the 1962 Route Reclassification Act took place. One of the changes implemented was the extension of Route 142, which served the Short Beach section of Branford, along modern Route 337 to the beach communities of Momauguin and Morris Cove. In 1969, Route 142 was truncated to its original western terminus and the former alignment was redesignated as SR 704. In 1987, SR 704 was redesignated as Route 337. In 1997, the eastern end was reconfigured to use Coe Avenue instead of continuing on Silver Sands Road.

== Junction list ==
The entire route is in New Haven County.

Location	mi	km	Destinations	Notes
New Haven	0.00	0.00	US 1 – Downtown New Haven, Branford	Western terminus
New Haven	0.06	0.097	I-95 south – New York City	Access via SR 741; exit 48 on I-95 north
East Haven	4.91	7.90	Route 142 – Short Beach, Branford	Eastern terminus
1.000 mi = 1.609 km; 1.000 km = 0.621 mi
