= Thimble Island Brewing Co =

Brewery in Connecticut, United States

Coordinates: 41°17′53″N 72°45′6″W

Thimble Island Brewing Co.
- Company type: Private
- Industry: Alcoholic beverage
- Founded: 2009
- Headquarters: Branford, CT; United States
- Products: Beer
- Production output: 10,000 barrels
- Website: thimbleislandbrewery.com

Thimble Island Brewing Co. was a brewery established in 2009 by homebrewers Mike Fawcett and Justin Gargano in Branford, Connecticut, USA. Thimble Island's American Amber Ale is the company's flagship and best-selling craft beer.

On May 9, 2025, the company announced they would be shutting down its Branford taproom on May 24, 2025 due to industry declines and a failed strategic partnership coupled with personal health challenges dealt with by the owner. The craft brewing market has faced several headwinds due to the COVID-19 pandemic, including rising costs and over-saturation.

== See also ==
- Connecticut breweries
- Beer in the United States
