= 2010 Duke University faux sex thesis controversy =

The 2010 Duke University faux sex thesis controversy arose from a private 42-page PowerPoint document written by a Duke University senior, Karen Owen, in the format of a thesis about her sexual experiences during her time attending the university.

The matter attracted the notice of national newspapers in the US and Britain, as well as analysis in a legal journal and an education journal. In popular culture, the thesis featured in an episode of Law & Order: Special Victims Unit.

== The document ==
Shortly before graduating from Duke University in May 2010, Karen Owen wrote a PowerPoint document in the style of a thesis presentation about her sexual experiences during her time attending the university. In the faux thesis, titled "An education beyond the classroom: excelling in the realm of horizontal academics", Owen ranked her partners based on her criteria for performance. The criteria included the subjects' athletic ability, creativity, entertainment, sexual aggressiveness, size ("length and girth of the Subjects' hardware"), and talent. Each encounter was documented with the names of the subjects, photographs, "memorable moments", pros and cons of the experience, and a score. The scores were summarized in a bar chart.

== The controversy ==
Owen privately distributed the document to three friends. In mid-September 2010, during Homecoming weekend, one of these friends decided to forward it onward, and the document went viral. The business magazine Forbes called it a "huge stor[y] that speak[s] to the way we live online", commenting that the "athletes" in Owen's document had "lost control over the sharing" of details of their sexual activities and prowess. By that time, Owen had already graduated, so the university could not sanction her academically.

The bulk of the controversy surrounded whether she invaded her partners' rights to privacy, and whether the subjects of Owen's faux thesis have a right to sue, as was done in the case of Jessica Cutler when Cutler published details of her sex life on a blog. It also raised questions as to whether double standards exist, and whether the reaction would have been the same had the faux thesis been written by a male. The faux dissertation attracted additional attention because some of the men whom Owen ranked were from the lacrosse team, and there was an unrelated sex controversy surrounding the team a few years prior. In addition, as The New York Times noted, Duke University was embarrassed by the public reaction to the "private joke" written by a "senior" (a recent graduate).

== Reaction ==
Vanity Fair magazine wrote that Duke University's student newspaper had printed a "wry editorial about the scandal", describing Owen as having gained a sort of "feminist victory", arguing that women had closed the gender gap if "a seemingly innocent and fairly generic Duke girl" could destroy "a dozen varsity athletes'" reputations with nothing more than a PowerPoint file, and be punished with nothing worse than a hint of a book deal.

About a month after the faux thesis made headlines, the Duke University History Department held a forum about the long-term implications of the faux thesis. A few months after that, The Atlantic published an article discussing this incident in the context of Duke's culture as well as binge drinking by women. Forbes objected to what it saw as The Atlantic's use of the incident to criticize Duke, stating that there was "no evidence" to support its "rather vitriolic attack" on the school, which had asserted that Duke had "never moved on from the values of the 1980s".

The Charleston Law Review discussed the matter in detail as an instance of how "seemingly 'private' behavior quickly became an overnight Internet sensation." It noted that Owen had circulated her thesis only to friends, expecting them to be her complete audience, meaning that in law she had not waived her right to privacy. The article quoted the adage that "the Internet is forever" and observed that Owen's example shows that "not all information on the Internet can be controlled". It suggested that Owen "should use the seldom-used tort of publication of private, embarrassing facts".

The thesis continued to attract newspaper and academic interest in later years. In 2014, the British newspaper The Telegraph published an article about it, likening the thesis to actress Lindsay Lohan's list of all her sexual conquests. The same year, the events were mentioned in a research article on cyberbullying in higher education.

Also in 2014, Rolling Stone magazine commented that the 2010 Duke "scandal" was neither the first nor the last of the "wild controversies" on US college campuses. It listed the cases of the alleged rape of Katie Hnida at the University of Colorado in 1999; the Duke University lacrosse team's stripper party in 2006; Arizona State University's cheerleaders in underwear in 2008, following an earlier instance of an ASU cheerleader in a porn film; and Grove City College's John Gechter who featured in multiple gay porn movies. After the Duke events, controversial because of the names and photographs included on Owen's list, Brandon Davies of Brigham Young University's basketball team was suspended in 2011 for breaking the college's honor code by having sex with his girlfriend. Also in 2011, Northwestern University ran a "demonstration" in their human sexuality class in which a woman was pleasured on stage with an electrically operated sex toy; the class was later dropped.

== The author ==
=== Background ===
Karen Owen, the author of the faux thesis, grew up in Branford, Connecticut and graduated from Branford High School in 2006. She won a scholarship to attend Duke and was a very avid sports fan during her time there.

=== Following the controversy ===
After her faux dissertation went viral, Owen deleted, closed down, or blocked access to her social networking sites. She stated "that fraternities 'make lists like this all the time.'" She also expressed deep regret over the incident, saying that she would have "never intentionally hurt the people that [were] mentioned [in the faux thesis]." Forbes commented that Owen's attempt to remove her digital footprint from the Web "proved impossible", noting that cached versions of profiles could still be found, and that it was futile to delete materials once they had been released on to the Internet.

== In popular culture ==
On December 1, 2010, the NBC crime drama series Law & Order: Special Victims Unit aired an episode called "Rescue", based on the story of Owen's faux sex thesis. The producer and scriptwriter, Dan Truly, is cited by the Duke University student newspaper as saying that he chose Owen's story because of "the richness of her voice as a writer." The protagonist, an advertising executive named Caitlin, creates a PowerPoint document entitled "My Lay List: A Scholarly Treatise On Office Relationships", which goes viral. The investigating detective comments on the double standard popularly applied in such cases: "Guys who sleep around are studs, girls are sluts." Rolling Stone described the transformation of Owen's "fuck list" into fiction as "our nation's highest honor".

== See also ==
- The Escort, a film about a prostitute with a similar back story that makes it impossible for her to get a non-sex work job
- Lena Chen, an American artist and writer whose blog Sex and the Ivy, recounting her sexual experiences while attending Harvard College, inspired similar controversy

== Resources ==
- Carmon, Irin. "College Girl's PowerPoint "Fuck List" Goes Viral: The document in full". Jezebel. Archived from the original on 3 October 2010. Reproduces the entire faux dissertation, with names redacted and faces blurred.
