= List of breweries in Connecticut =

Breweries in Connecticut produce a wide range of beers in different styles that are marketed locally, regionally, nationally, and internationally. In 2012 Connecticut's 22 breweries and brewpubs employed 430 people directly, and 12,000 others in related jobs such as wholesaling and retailing. Including people directly employed in brewing, as well as those who supply Connecticut's breweries with everything from ingredients to machinery, the total business and personal tax revenue generated by Connecticut's breweries and related industries was more than $375 million. Consumer purchases of Connecticut's brewery products generated another $105 million in tax revenue. In 2012, according to the Brewers Association, Connecticut ranked 33rd in the number of craft breweries per capita with 21.

For context, at the end of 2013 there were 2,822 breweries in the United States, including 2,768 craft breweries subdivided into 1,237 brewpubs, 1,412 microbreweries and 119 regional craft breweries. In that same year, according to the Beer Institute, the brewing industry employed around 43,000 Americans in brewing and distribution and had a combined economic impact of more than $246 billion.

== Connecticut breweries ==
- Alvarium Beer Company – New Britain
- Area Two Experimental Brewing – Stratford
- Back East Brewing Company – Bloomfield
- Bad Sons Beer Company – Derby
- Beaver Beer Company – Greens Farms
- Beer'd Brewing Company – Stonington
- Black Hog Brewing Company – Oxford
- Black Pond Brews – Danielson
- Brass Work Brewing Company – Waterbury
- Brewery Legitimus – New Hartford
- Brewport Brewing Co. – Bridgeport
- Broad Brook Brewing Company – East Windsor
- Cambridge House Brew Pub – Granby
- Center Street Brewing – Wallingford
- Charter Oak Brewing Company – Danbury
- City Steam Brewery Cafe (restaurant closed; still selling retail) – Hartford
- Cliffside Brewing – Wallingford
- Cottrell Brewing Company – Pawcatuck
- Cold Creek Brewery – Ellington
- Connecticut Valley Brewing Company – South Windsor
- Counter Weight Brewing Company – Hamden
- Dead Language Beer Project– Hartford
- Dudleytown Brewing Company - Windsor
- DuVig Brewing Company – Branford
- East Rock Brewing Company – New Haven
- Fat Orange Cat Brew Co. – East Hampton
- Firefly Hollow Brewing Company – Bristol
- Five Churches Brewing – New Britain
- Forest City Brewing – Middletown
- Front Porch Brewing – Wallingford
- Fox Farm Brewery – Salem
- Great Falls Brewing Company– North Canaan
- Half Full Brewery – Stamford
- Hanging Hills Brewing Company - Hartford
- Hog River Brewing Company – Hartford
- Iron Brewing – Norwalk
- Kent Falls Brewing Company – Kent
- Kinsmen Brewing Company – Southington
- Lock City Brewery – Stamford
- Luppoleto Brewing Company - Windsor
- Milford Point Brewing – Milford
- New England Brewing Company – Woodbridge
- New Park Brewing – West Hartford
- Nod Hill Brewery – Ridgefield
- OEC Brewing – Oxford
- Off the Rails Brewing Co. - Stafford Springs
- Overshores Brewing Company – East Haven
- Powder Hollow Brewery – Enfield
- Redding Beer Company - Redding, Connecticut
- Relic Brewing Company – Plainville
- Sly Bandit Brewing Company – Wilton
- Still Hill Brewery – Rocky Hill
- Stony Creek Brewery – Branford
- Stubborn Beauty – Middletown
- Thimble Island Brewing Company – Branford
- The Brewery at Maple View Farm - Granby
- These Guys Brewing – Norwich
- Thomas Hooker Brewing Company – Bloomfield
- Top Shelf Brewing Company (out of business) – Manchester
- Transcend Beer Crafters – Full kitchen and taproom at 45 Northwest Dr., Plainville
- Two Roads Brewing Company – Stratford
- Twelvenote Brew Co. – Bridgeport
- Urban Lodge Brewing Company - Manchester
- Willimantic Brewing Company – Willimantic
- Witchdoctor Brewing Company – Southington
- Woodbury Brewing Company – Woodbury

== Closed Permanently ==
- Aspetuck Brew Lab – Closed November 2024 – Bridgeport
  - Sold to Twelvenote Brew Co.
- Barley Head Brewery – Closed July 2024 – Mystic
  - Sold to The Misfit Club (Bar that will still sell some Barley Head Brewery beers)

== See also ==
- Beer in the United States
- List of breweries in the United States
- List of microbreweries
