= Connecticut Route 146 =

State highway in New Haven County, Connecticut, US

Route 146
- Map of New Haven County in southern Connecticut with Route 146 highlighted in red

Route information
- Maintained by CTDOT
- Length: 13.00 mi (20.92 km)
- Existed: 1932–present

Major junctions
- West end: US 1 / Route 142 in Branford
- I-95 / US 1 in Guilford
- East end: US 1 in Guilford

Location
- Country: United States
- State: Connecticut
- Counties: New Haven

Highway system
- Connecticut State Highway System; Interstate; US; State; SSR; SR; Scenic
← Route 145	→ Route 147

Route 146 is a state road that serves as a scenic alternative to US 1 between Branford and Guilford in the U.S. state of Connecticut. Route 146 is 13.00 miles (20.92 km) long, with 8.36 miles (13.45 km) in Branford and 4.64 miles (7.47 km) in Guilford.

== Route description ==
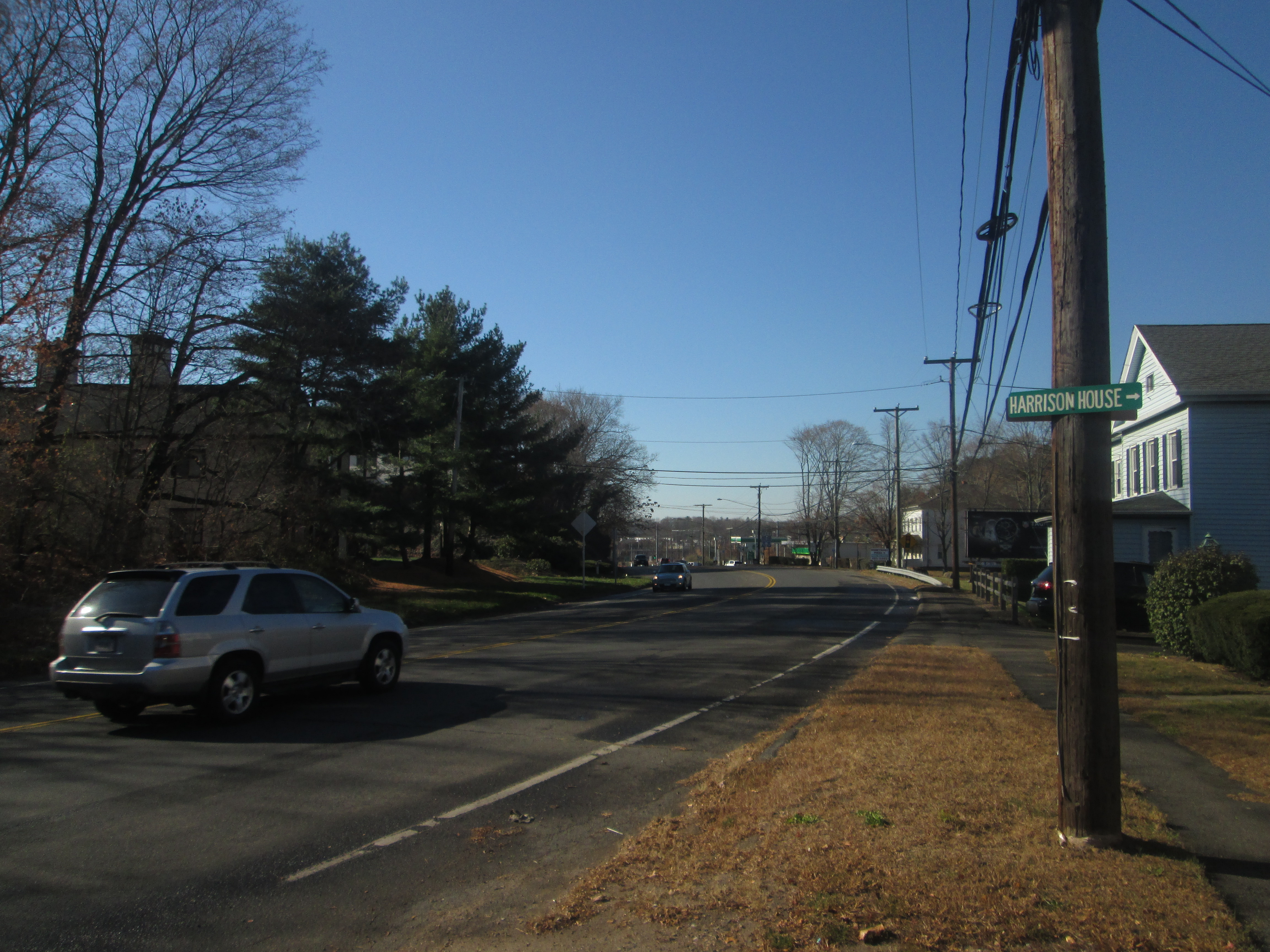
Route 146 in Branford near the Harrison House Museum

Route 146 begins in Branford as Main Street, splitting off from West Main Street (US 1) just east of the Branford Connector, which connects to I-95 south. It heads east towards Branford Center and shifts to South Main Street as it passes behind the Branford Green. At the end of the street, Route 146 turns south onto Montowese Street, becoming South Montowese Street and Sybil Avenue as it proceeds southward towards the Indian Neck section of the town at the shore of Long Island Sound. The road then bears east along the shore as Limewood Avenue, Hotchkiss Grove Road, Elizabeth Street, and Pine Orchard Road, heading into the Pine Orchard section of town. At Pine Orchard, Route 146 turns north onto Blackstone Avenue and Totoket Road. The road then takes a sharp eastward turn at Stony Creek Road then heads east and south onto Leetes Island Road. Leetes Island Road crosses into the town of Guilford, bears north briefly on Sachem Head Road, then northeast onto Water Street, passing on the south side of the Guilford Town Green as Boston Street, eventually terminating at US 1 east of the town center.

The road crosses under Amtrak railroad tracks several times, over the Branford River, by Youngs Pond and crosses a local rail line. Wightwood School, a private school serving pre-kindergarten through eighth grade, is on Stony Creek Road.

Route 146 is a state-designated scenic road, beginning 0.84 miles (1.35 km) from its western terminus in Branford, near Church Street and continuing for the remainder of the route. The section in Branford is also designated the Edward Ramos Memorial Highway, in honor of a Branford firefighter who died in the line of duty. The road and the adjacent properties from Flat Rock Road in Branford to the West River in Guilford has been designated as a historic district on the National Register of Historic Places known as Route 146 Historic District.

== History ==
Route 146 was commissioned as part of the 1932 state highway renumbering, running from the intersection of US 1 and Leetes Island Road in Branford, south to the current route, then eastward to the current Route 77 in Guilford, and northward along the current Route 77 to US 1. In 1955, the eastern section was rerouted to the current route along Boston Street with Route 77 extended southward along former Route 146. In 1962, Route 146 took over former Route 143 (road to Indian Neck and Pine Orchard) and former SR 445 (South Main Street), ending at US 1A (Main Street). The following year, US 1A was decommissioned in Branford, and Main Street became part of Route 146.

== Junction list ==
The entire route is in New Haven County.

Location	mi	km	Destinations	Notes
Branford	0.00	0.00	US 1 / Route 142 west to I-95 south – New York City, East Haven, Guilford, Short Beach	Western terminus; eastern terminus of Route 142; access to I-95 south via SR 794
Guilford	11.69	18.81	Route 77 north – North Guilford, Durham	Southern terminus of Route 77
Guilford	12.77	20.55	I-95 / US 1	Access via Goose Lane; exit 61 on I-95
Guilford	13.00	20.92	US 1 – Madison, Branford	Eastern terminus
1.000 mi = 1.609 km; 1.000 km = 0.621 mi
