= Connecticut Route 142 =

State highway in New Haven County, Connecticut, US

Route 142
- Map of New Haven County in southern Connecticut with Route 142 highlighted in red

Route information
- Maintained by CTDOT
- Length: 4.27 mi (6.87 km)
- Existed: 1932–present

Major junctions
- West end: US 1 in East Haven
- East end: US 1 / Route 146 in Branford

Location
- Country: United States
- State: Connecticut
- Counties: New Haven

Highway system
- Connecticut State Highway System; Interstate; US; State; SSR; SR; Scenic
← Route 140	→ Route 145

Route 142 is a state highway in Connecticut that serves as an alternate route of US 1, passing through the village of Short Beach on the Branford shoreline. It starts at US 1 in East Haven and ends at US 1 in Branford, running for 4.27 miles (6.87 km).

== Route description ==
Route 142 begins as Hemingway Avenue at an intersection with US 1 in East Haven. It heads south, intersecting with Route 100 (Main Street) in the downtown area, and then turns eastward about 0.7 miles (1.1 km) later along Short Beach Road. This intersection also marks the western end of Route 337, which continues straight. Route 142 goes through the southern part of East Haven as it heads towards the village of Short Beach. After crossing the Farm River into the town of Branford, the road becomes known as Shore Drive. In Branford, it continues east through Short Beach and Double Beach, then turns north along Short Beach Road to end at another intersection with US 1 in the Branford Hills neighborhood.

The section of Route 142 in Branford from Double Beach Road to the eastern terminus is designated the "William E. Keish, Jr. Memorial Highway", named after a Connecticut Department of Transportation official.

== History ==
In 1922, Connecticut first numbered its state highways. The route through Short Beach was, at that time, designated as State Highway 171. Modern Route 142 was created in the 1932 state highway renumbering from old Highway 171. In 1962, the portion north of the intersection with Route 337 was transferred to Route 100, and Route 142 was extended westward along Silver Sands Road and modern Route 337 to US 1 in the Annex section of New Haven. In 1969, these changes were reversed. The former section in New Haven was designated SR 704, which later became Route 337 in 1987.

== Junction list ==
The entire route is in New Haven County.

Location	mi	km	Destinations	Notes
East Haven	0.00	0.00	US 1 – New Haven, Branford	Western terminus
East Haven	0.26	0.42	Route 100 – Foxon, Branford	
East Haven	0.97	1.56	Route 337 west – Short Beach	Eastern terminus of Route 337
Branford	4.27	6.87	US 1 / Route 146 east to I-95 south – New York City, East Haven, Guilford, Stony Creek	Eastern terminus; western terminus of Route 146; access to I-95 south via SR 794
1.000 mi = 1.609 km; 1.000 km = 0.621 mi
