= NEBCO =

NEBCO may refer to:

- New England Brewing Company
- New England Brick Company (1900–1956), a now-defunct New England corporation
- NEBCO, Inc., a Nebraska company with interests in the manufacture and distribution of construction materials
