= Brentford (disambiguation) =

Brentford is a town in west London in England.

Brentford may also refer to:

- Brentford (constituency), former UK Parliament constituency
- Brentford (ward), former Hounslow London Borough Council electoral ward
- Brentford F.C., an English football club
- Viscount Brentford, a title in the Peerage of the United Kingdom
- Brentford, South Dakota, a town in Spink County, United States

== See also ==
- Brantford (disambiguation)
- Battle of Brentford (disambiguation)
