= Branford Connector =

Freeway in Connecticut

- Branford Connector highlighted in red

Route information
- Length: 1.1 mi (1.8 km)
- Component highways: SR 794 (unsigned) entire length

Major junctions
- South end: US 1 / Route 142 / Route 146 in Branford
- North end: I-95 in Branford

Location
- Country: United States
- State: Connecticut
- Counties: New Haven

Highway system
- Connecticut State Highway System; Interstate; US; State; SSR; SR; Scenic
| ← I-691 | SR 794 | → US 1 |

The Branford Connector is a two-lane divided freeway in the U.S. state of Connecticut. It serves as a connecting road from Interstate 95 (I-95) to U.S. Route 1 (US 1). The roadway has been numbered State Road 794 by the Connecticut Department of Transportation.

== Route description ==
The Branford Connector connects I-95 and US 1, running entirely within the town of Branford, Connecticut. It is a 1.05-mile-long (1.69 km) two-lane divided freeway. The route has full access control along its entire length. Exit signs on I-95 mark the route as access to US 1, Route 142 to Short Beach, and Route 146.

The route includes an incomplete interchange with I-95. Northbound traffic from I-95 may exit to go southbound on the connector. Northbound traffic on the Branford Connector may only merge onto southbound I-95. Traffic cannot go from southbound I-95 to the Connector. Nor can traffic go from the connector to northbound I-95.

== History ==
The Branford Connector opened in 1958, at the same time that the Connecticut Turnpike opened. It was designated State Road 994 in 1963. However, in 1964, the designation was changed to State Road 794.

== Exit list ==
The entire route is in Branford, New Haven County.

| mi | km | Destinations | Notes |
|---|---|---|---|
| 0.0 | 0.0 | US 1 / Route 142 west / Route 146 east | Southern terminus; eastern terminus of Route 142; western terminus of Route 146; at-grade intersection |
| 1.1 | 1.8 | I-95 south – New York City | Northern terminus; exit 52 on I-95 north |
1.000 mi = 1.609 km; 1.000 km = 0.621 mi
