= Brantford (disambiguation) =

Brantford is a city in Ontario, Canada.

Brantford may also refer to:

== Related to the city ==
- Brantford (federal electoral district), an electoral district from 1904 to 1925 and from 1949 to 1968
- Brantford (provincial electoral district), in existence from 1925 to 1996
- Brantford Township, Ontario, a former township
- Brantford Airport
- Brantford station, a Via Rail station
- Brantford Grammar School, predecessor of Brantford Collegiate Institute
- Brantford Golf & Country Club, a private golf course and former curling club
- Brantford 99ers, a former Junior A ice hockey team in the Ontario Junior Hockey League
- Brantford Alexanders, a former junior ice hockey team in the Ontario Major Junior Hockey League and Ontario Hockey League
- Brantford Blast, originally the Brantford Prowl, a former senior ice hockey team in the Ontario Hockey Association
- Brantford Bulldogs, a major junior ice hockey team in the Ontario Hockey League
- Brantford Eagles a former junior ice hockey team in the Greater Ontario Junior Hockey League
- Brantford Galaxy, a former semi-professional soccer club
- Brantford Harlequins, a collection of rugby union teams
- Brantford Indians a former professional ice hockey team in the Ontario Professional Hockey League
- Brantford Lions, a former junior ice hockey team in the Ontario Hockey Association
- Brantford Motts Clamatos, a former senior ice hockey team in the Ontario Hockey Association's Senior A Hockey League
- Brantford Redskins, a football team in the Ontario Rugby Football Union
- Brantford Red Sox, an independent team of the Intercounty Baseball League
- Brantford Smoke, a former minor professional ice hockey team in the Colonial Hockey League and United Hockey League
- Brantford Titans, a junior ice hockey team

== Other uses ==
- HMCS Brantford, a Royal Canadian Navy World War II corvette
- Mickey Brantford (1911–1984), English actor and filmmaker
- Brantford Township, Washington County, Kansas, Washington County, Kansas, United States
- Brantford Township, Hamlin County, South Dakota, Hamlin County, South Dakota, United States
- Brantford, New Hampshire, fictional location of the 1995 film Jumanji

== See also ==
- Branford (disambiguation)
- Brentford (disambiguation)
