= Branford Point Historic District =

Historic district in Connecticut, United States

- U.S. National Register of Historic Places
- U.S. Historic district
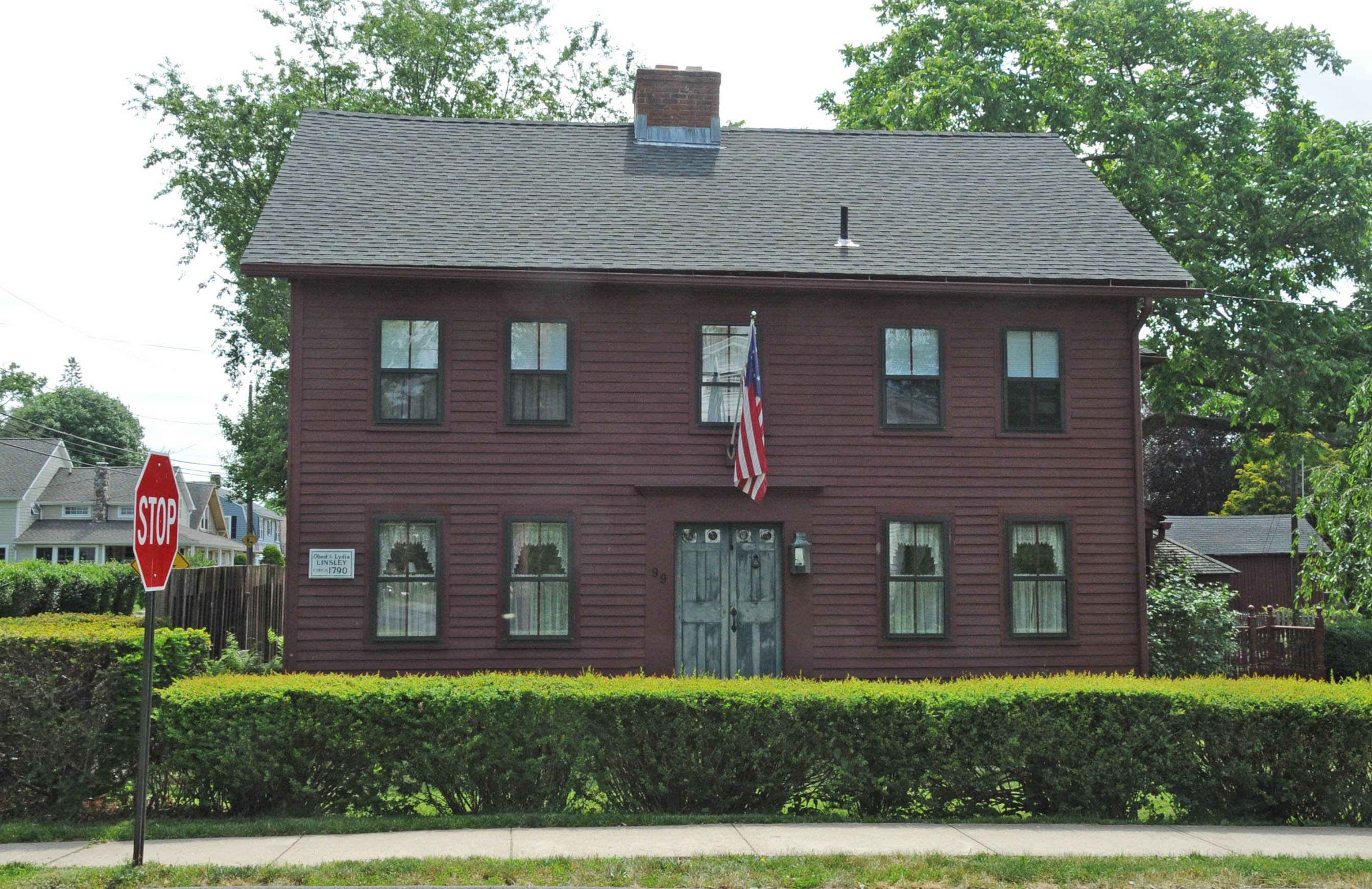

- Location within Connecticut Location within the United States
- Location: Roughly along Harbor Street North from Curve Street to Branford Point, also Maple Street East from Reynolds Street to Harbor Street, Branford, Connecticut
- Coordinates: 41°15′57″N 72°49′18″W
- Area: 54 acres (22 ha)
- Architect: Wadstrom, Oscar; Cleeton, John
- Architectural style: Mid 19th Century Revival, Late 19th And 20th Century Revivals, Late Victorian
- NRHP reference No.: 88001583
- Added to NRHP: September 15, 1988

The Branford Point Historic District is a historic district in Branford, Connecticut. It was listed on the National Register of Historic Places in 1988. It includes a significant portion of the Branford Point neighborhood, generally considered to be the area along the west side of the Branford Harbor to the Amtrak railroad tracks. It is bounded on the west by the Short Beach neighborhood, on the north by Branford Center, and on the east by the Branford River. Harbor Street, Maple Avenue, and Stannard Avenue are the main thoroughfares of the neighborhood. In the 2000 Census, Branford Point was included by the U.S. Census Bureau in the Branford Center census-designated place.

The historic district is a roughly T-shaped area within the neighborhood, extending along Harbor Street from Curve Street in the north to Parker Memorial Park and the tip of the eponymous Branford Point in the south. The crossbar of the T is formed by a portion of Maple Street, and the district also includes properties on Curve Street and Bryan Road. At the time of NRHP listing in 1988, there were 207 buildings in the district, of which 158 were buildings that were deemed to contribute to the historic character of the district.

This area is historically notable for housing Branford's highest concentration of late 19th and early 20th century residential architecture. Up to the mid-19th century, this area was mainly farmland and difficult to reach from Branford Center. Harbor Street, with its bridge over Mill Brook, and Maple Avenue were both laid out in 1819, providing improved access. Beginning in the mid-19th century George Parker developed the area around Branford Point as a day resort, with a beach and wharf. His heirs eventually donated the property to the town to form Parker Memorial Park. The northern portion of the district developed as a residential area for workers at the nearby iron foundry (located just north of the district). The result of this development pattern was an assemblage of residences including late 18th-century farmhouses, Greek Revival houses of the mid-19th century, late 19th-century Victorians, and Colonial Revival houses of the early 20th century.

== See also ==
- National Register of Historic Places listings in New Haven County, Connecticut
