= North Branford Center Historic District =

Historic district in Connecticut, United States

- U.S. National Register of Historic Places
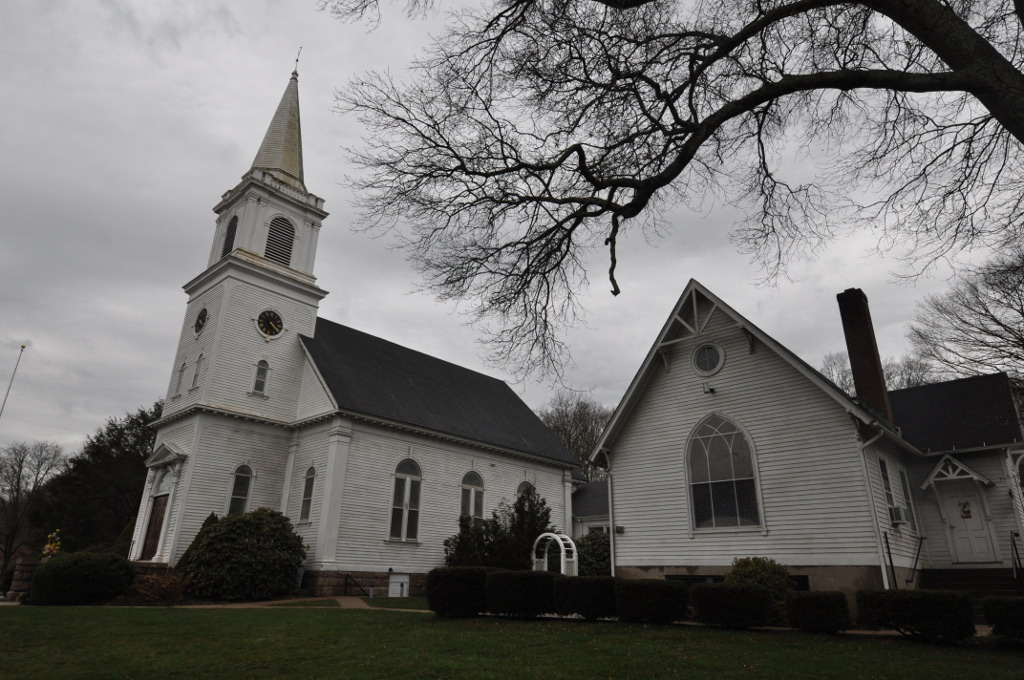

- Location within Connecticut Location within the United States
- Location: Roughly along Church and North Streets, North Branford, Connecticut
- Coordinates: 41°19′46″N 72°45′52″W
- Area: 53 acres (21 ha)
- Architectural style: Colonial, Greek Revival, et al.
- NRHP reference No.: 99001472
- Added to NRHP: December 9, 1999

The North Branford Center Historic District encompasses the historic town center of North Branford, Connecticut. Centered at the Junction of North Street and Foxon Road, it has been the center of the town's civic and religious life since the early 18th century. The district includes the town hall, library, Congregational Church, and residential architecture dating to the early days. The district was listed on the National Register of Historic Places in 1999.

== Description and history ==
North Branford was settled as part of Branford beginning in the late 17th century, and was granted the right to establish a separate Congregational parish in 1717. It was separately incorporated in 1831. The town center was established around the site of the first church (replaced in 1830 and again in 1908 by the present Romanesque edifice), and includes its oldest cemetery, where its early ministers are interred. It remained in essence a small country town center, with its small businesses eventually eliminated by competitive goods and service delivered by railroad.

The historic district is about 53 acres (21 ha) in size, and is basically T-shaped, extending along the north side of Foxon Road in both directions from North Street, and along North, Church, and Chapel Streets to its north. The only building on the south side of Foxon Road included in the district is the c. 1870 North Branford Hall, built as a school and now housing town offices. All of the buildings in the district are of wood frame construction, except for the Atwater Memorial Library, a brick Colonial Revival structure built in 1943 and enlarged in 1967. It was built on what was originally part of the town green, which is now limited to a triangular portion adjacent to the church. The green dates to 1765, and is where the local militia mustered in the American Revolutionary War.

== See also ==
- National Register of Historic Places listings in New Haven County, Connecticut
