= Ron Glick =

American–Israeli professional football player (born 1985)

Ron Glick רון גליק
Personal information
- Full name: Ronald Glick
- Date of birth: January 23, 1985 (age 41)
- Place of birth: Branford, Connecticut, U.S.
- Position: Striker

Youth career
- –2005: Maccabi Petah Tikva

Senior career*
Years	Team	Apps	(Gls)
2004–2007	Maccabi Petah Tikva	4	(0)
2004–2005	→ Hapoel Mahane Yehuda		
2007–2008	Southern Connecticut State University	11	(0)
2008–2009	Maccabi Herzliya		

International career
2004	Israel U19	2	(0)
- * Club domestic league appearances and goals

Ron Glick (Hebrew: רון גליק; born January 23, 1985) is an American–Israeli former professional soccer player.

== Playing career ==
Glick made his senior debut in a Toto Cup match during the 2004/05 season. The next season, he made his Israeli Premier League debut against Beitar Jerusalem as a substitute in the ninetieth minute. Four rounds later, Glick found himself in the starting eleven against F.C. Ashdod. The 2006/07 season was due to be his breakout year, but a rash of injuries relegated him to seeing most matches from the stands.

After returning from injury, Glick hired a personal trainer to stay return to match fitness. He also had an unsuccessful trial with Toronto FC in the American MLS, later San Jose Earthquakes and Columbus Crew in May 2008. In May 2009, Glick moved to Australian club FC Oont, on a free transfer. He has subsequently been named captain and helped the team to a runners up finish for the 2010 season, scoring a few key goals in the process.

=== National team ===
On February 9, 2004, Glick made his debut with the Israeli under-19 squad against their counterparts from Romania. The two-game series, one match in Kiryat Ata, the other in Ra'anana, were the only appearances that Glick has made for a national side at any age level.

== Personal life ==
In September 2009, Glick heroically rescued a person drowning in the Mediterranean Sea. Glick was on the beach in Herzliya when he heard someone screaming for help. No lifeguards were present so Glick grabbed a surfboard and was able to save the person from drowning.

== Model career ==
Glick is also a model formerly with the Roberto Modeling Agency in Israel, he recently signed with Ford Models in the USA.
