= Pine Orchard Yacht and Country Club =

Pine Orchard Yacht and Country Club is a private yacht club in Branford, Connecticut. It was established in 1901 to provide recreation in the hot summer months to members who lived in nearby cities. Facilities include a number of tennis courts, a nine-hole golf course, clubhouse, pool and a 100-slip marina.

The club describes itself as an "inter-generational family club." New members must be proposed by current members. New members are considered "provisional" for two years.
