= Lena Chen =

American artist, writer and activist

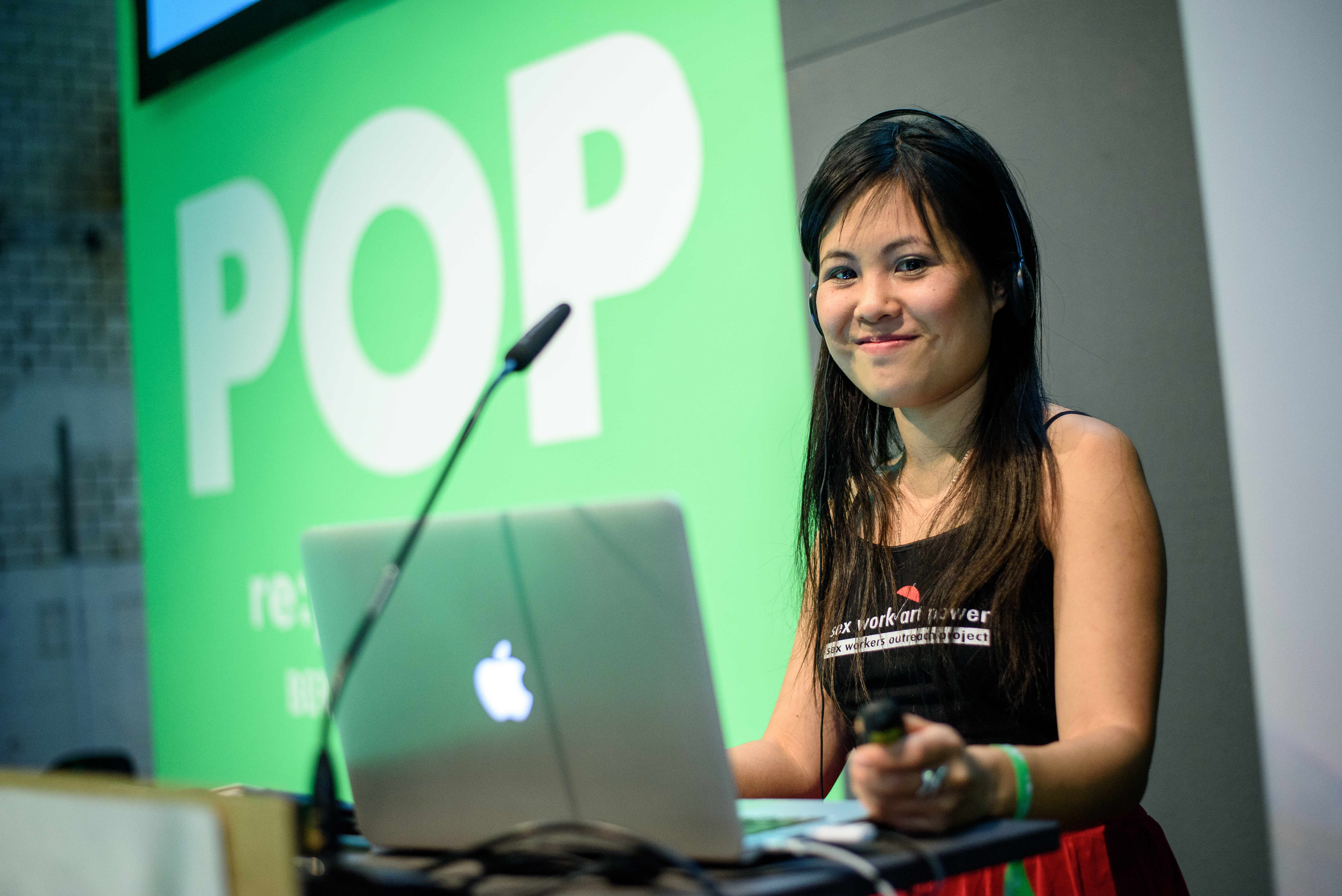
- Lena Chen (2018)
- Born: August 13, 1987 (age 39); San Francisco, California, U.S.
- Education: Harvard College
- Occupation: Writer/Artist
- Writing career
- Notable works: Sex and the Ivy
- Website: lenachen.com

Lena Chen (born August 13, 1987) is an American feminist artist, writer, and activist based in Berlin and Los Angeles. Born in San Francisco, California, Chen studied sociology and minored in Studies of Women, Gender, & Sexuality at Harvard College. Her work addresses women's identity, trauma, and intimacy.

== Work ==
=== Writing ===
In August 2006, she started penning the blog Sex and the Ivy. Her first-person accounts of sexual experiences, depression, and undergraduate life at one of America's premier academic institutions spurred campus discussion, prompted media attention, and garnered a following. Quickly becoming a controversial figure, she was criticized by some as morally reprehensible and praised by others for encouraging frank sexual dialogue. Her writing has appeared in The American Prospect, The Boston Globe, and The Sydney Morning Herald.

Following the publication of revenge porn by an ex-boyfriend in 2009, Chen and her partner were subject to online harassment. For the next five years, she continued blogging in spite of the attacks, until retiring in April 2013.

=== Art ===
In 2017, she revealed that she had been living in Berlin under an alternate identity ("Elle Peril") as part of a durational performance. In the aftermath of revenge porn, she posed nude for artists in order to reclaim agency over her body and presented documentation of her life as Elle Peril in a solo exhibition at S0MA Gallery. Her work has been shown at Human Resources Los Angeles. and Transmediale. In 2021, Chen co-created a digital game about sex work called OnlyBans, a play on the name of the digital platform OnlyFans.

=== Activism ===
In 2010, she co-organized the Feminist Coming Out Day campaign and the Rethinking Virginity conference.

=== Later life ===
By 2018 Chen had put her undergraduate notoriety behind her, and, according to The New York Times, was devoting her time to "curating art shows and events focused on helping other women heal from trauma."
