= Old Willimantic Post Office =

Willimantic Post Office
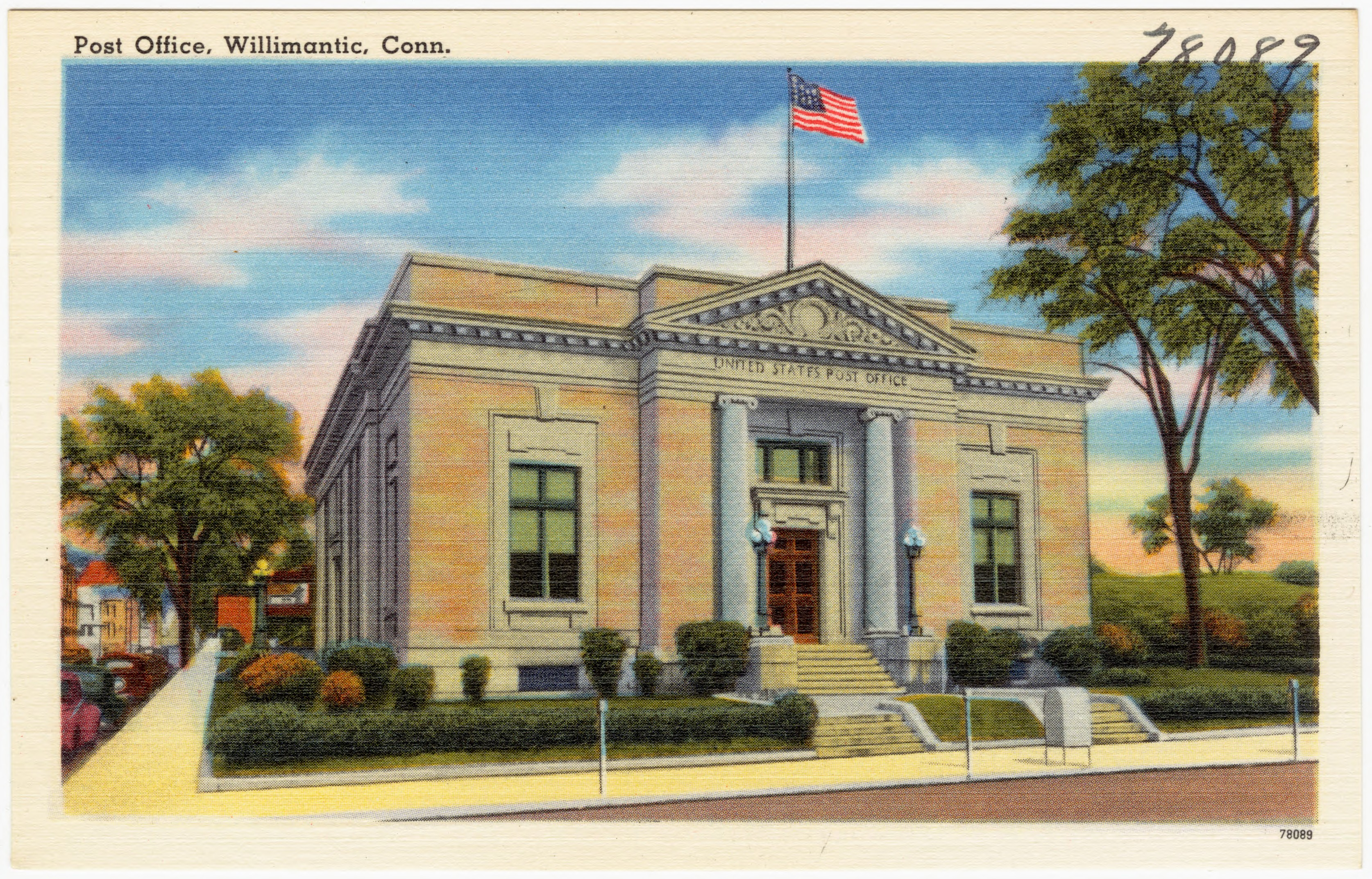
- A historic post card of the post office

- Location within Connecticut

General information
- Location: Willmantic, Connecticut
- Coordinates: 41.7130°N 72.2172°W
- Current tenants: Willimantic Brewing Co.
- Construction started: 1910
- Completed: 1912
- Renovated: 1997

The Willimantic Post Office is a former post office located in Willimantic, Connecticut. The post office was built between 1910 and 1912, and was used until 1966; when a new post office was built a block away. The Willimantic Brewing Company purchased the building in 1997 and converted it into a pub.
