= Battle of Brentford =

Battle of Brentford can refer to several battles at Brentford, London, England:

- Battle of Brentford (1016) between the invading Danes and the English
- Battle of Brentford (1642) during the English Civil War
