= Branford Town Hall =

Building in Connecticut, USA

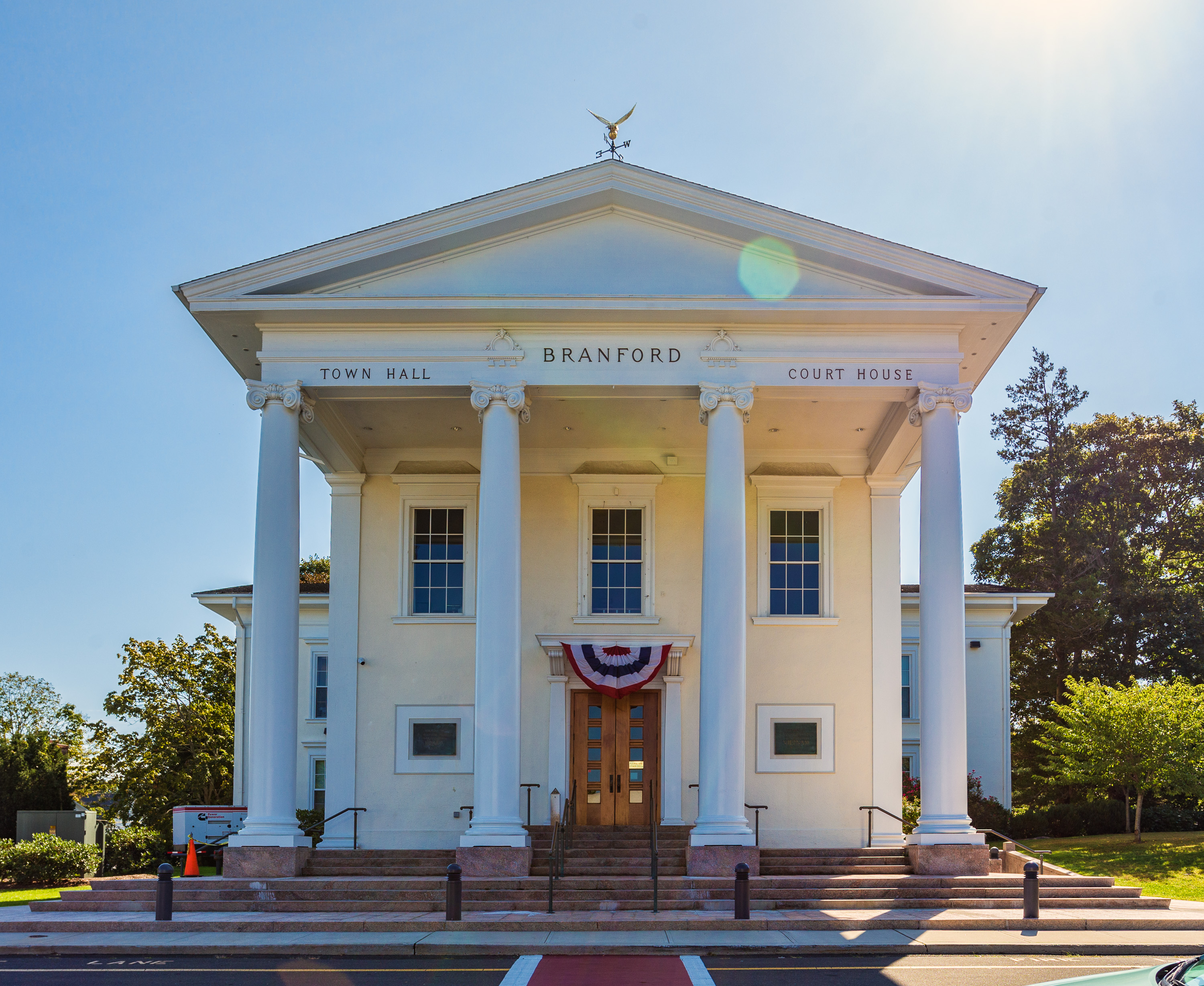
- Branford Town Hall

- Location within Connecticut

General information
- Location: 1019 Main Street, Branford, CT 06405
- Coordinates: 41.2814°N 72.8102°W
- Completed: 1857

Branford Town Hall is located at 1019 Main Street in Branford, Connecticut and is part of Branford Center.

== Construction ==
The Branford Town Hall was built in 1857 in the Greek Revival style and is attributed to Henry Austin. It has stuccoed exterior walls, and the building has received two renovations, the first of which was a columned front portico in the early 20th century and a rear addition in the late 20th century.

== Early history ==
Branford was founded in 1644 as part of the New Haven Colony. The town's growth in the 19th century prompted the need for this Town Hall and Court House.
