= Branford (surname) =

Branford is a surname, and may refer to:

- Anna Branford (born 1975), British author of children's books
- Frederick Victor Branford (1892–1941), British poet
- Henrietta Branford (1946–1999), English author
- Robert Branford (police officer) (1820–1869), English police officer
- Robert Branford (speedway rider) (born 1993), Australian speedway rider
- Victor Branford (1863–1930), British sociologist

== Fictional characters ==
- Terra Branford, protagonist of Final Fantasy VI
