= Branford High School (Connecticut) =

Public high school in Branford, Connecticut

Location
- 185 East Main Street; Branford, Connecticut 06405; United States; 41°17′20″N 72°48′03″W

Information
- Type: Public
- Established: 1928 (98 years ago)
- CEEB code: 070040
- Principal: Lee Panagoulias
- Staff: 70.00 (FTE)
- Enrollment: 784 (2023–24)
- Student to teacher ratio: 11.20
- Colors: Red and white
- Athletics conference: Southern Connecticut Conference
- Mascot: Hornet
- Website: https://bhs.branfordschools.org

Branford High School is a public high school in Branford, Connecticut. As of 2021–22, it has 784 students in grades 9–12.

Its former principal, Edmund Higgins, retired at the end of the 2007–08 school year.

All students must satisfy 13 performance graduation requirements in areas such as writing, non-fiction reading, mathematical problem solving, and scientific concepts.

One notable aspect of the school was its "Senior Exhibition" program. Every student had to complete a thorough research project on a topic of their choice during senior year. This was presented in front of a panel of judges and was graded on a pass/fail system.

The student newspaper is The Branford Buzz, which is an online-only publication.

== Athletics ==
Branford High School is a member of the Southern Connecticut Conference, the second largest conference in the state.

=== Baseball ===
The school baseball team has won three state championships, in 1999, 2006, and 2009.

=== Boys Ice Hockey ===
The Branford Hornets Ice Hockey team has won two State Championships in the Division II C.I.A.C. The Hornets first State Championship came in the 1987–88 season. The second State Championship was in the 2018–19 season. The Branford Hornets were also SCC Champions in the 2018–19, and 2019–20 season.

=== Girls Ice Hockey ===
The Branford Girls Ice Hockey team co-oped with East Haven, and North Branford in 2014. The team wore Branford High School hockey jerseys but were known as the Branford/ E. Haven/ N. Branford Hornets. The team won the SCC Championship in the 2014–15 season. In the 2015–16 season, the team was renamed the Branford/ East Haven/ N. Branford Wings, due to all their high school mascots having wings. Their jerseys reflected this, and the team colors were Red and White with a logo similar to the Detroit Red Wings logo.

=== Girls Lacrosse ===
The team won back to back State Championships in the 2016–17 and 2017–18 seasons.

=== List of Championship Wins ===
CIAC State Championships
Sport	Class	Year(s)
Baseball	L	1998, 2006, 2009
Basketball (boys)	C	1927
Basketball (boys)	C-D	1930
Basketball (boys)	M	1936, 1937, 1938, 1942, 1945, 1946, 1947
Basketball (girls)	L	1983, 1984
Basketball (girls)	V	2026
Dance	Hip Hop Small	2009, 2010, 2011, 2012, 2015, 2016, 2018, 2020, 2022, 2023, 2024, 2025, 2026
Dance	Jazz Small	2011, 2012, 2015, 2016, 2018, 2020, 2023, 2024, 2025
Dance	Hip Hop Large	2013
Dance	Jazz Large	2022
Field Hockey	M	1985, 1986, 1988, 1989 (Co-champions with Pomperaug), 1990, 1991, 2001, 2002, 2004, 2005, 2022, 2025
Football	MM	2005
Ice Hockey (boys)	II	1988, 2019
Lacrosse (boys)	II	2003
Lacrosse (girls)	M	2017, 2018
Soccer (boys)	L	2014 (Co-champions with Avon)
Softball	S	2025
Swimming (boys)	M	1983 (Co-champions with Foran), 1985, 1986, 1987, 1992, 2001
Swimming (boys)	L	1991
Swimming (girls)	M	1988, 1990, 1998, 2000, 2001, 2002, 2003, 2004, 2012
Swimming (girls)	L	2006
Tennis (girls)	M	1989
Track and field (outdoor, boys)	MM	2005
Volleyball (girls)	M	1981, 1982, 1983
Wrestling	M	2022

== Notable alumni ==
- Mike Olt, former professional baseball player for the Chicago Cubs, Chicago White Sox, and Texas Rangers
- Karen Owen, author of a faux thesis that caused a controversy when the document was publicized
- Jen Toomey, track and field athlete, American Indoor record holder 1000m
