= Stony Creek Brewery =

Craft brewery in Branford, Connecticut

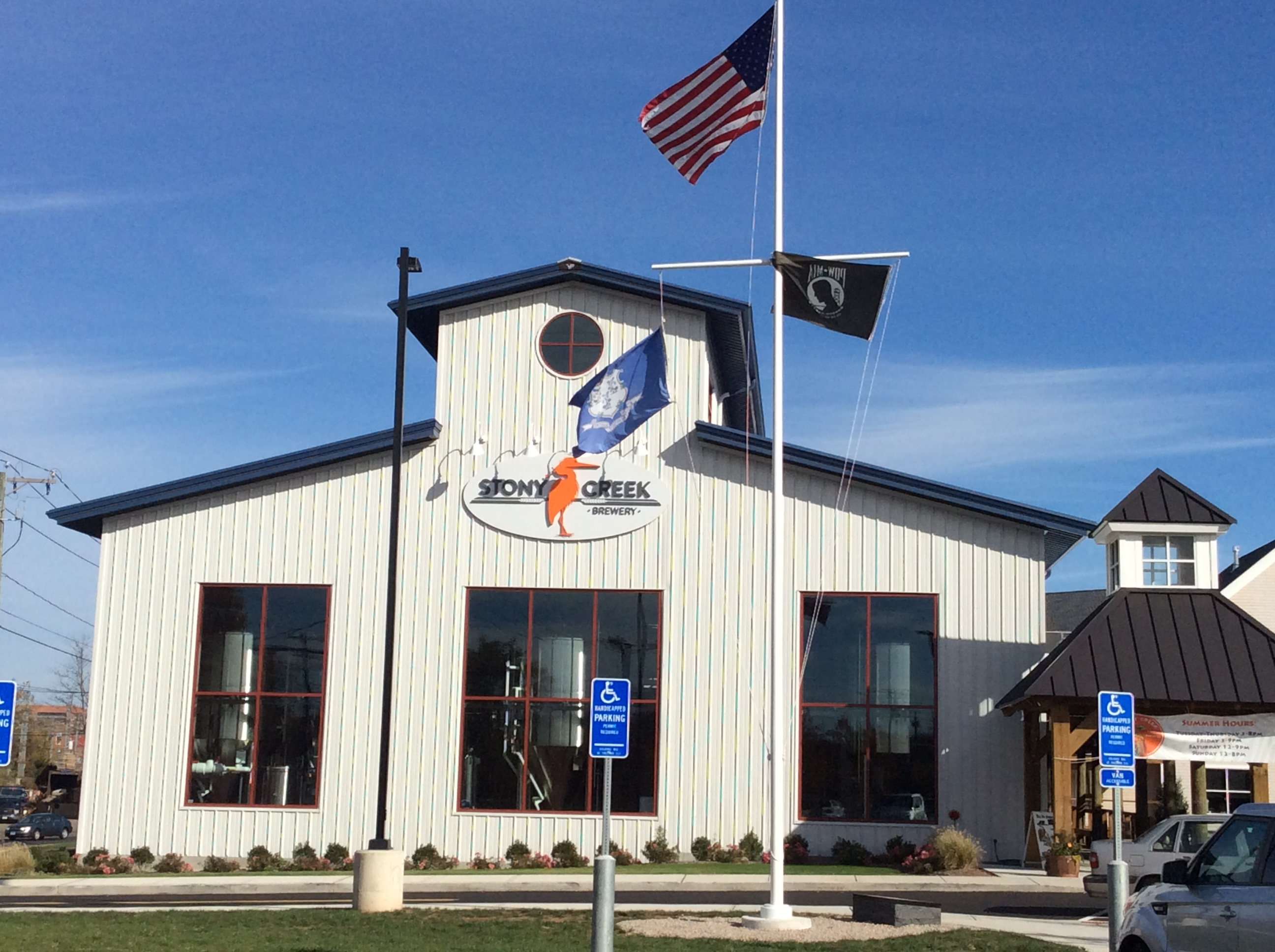
- Company type: Private
- Industry: Craft brewery
- Founded: 2015
- Headquarters: Branford, Connecticut, United States
- Products: Beer, wine
- Website: stonycreekbeer.com

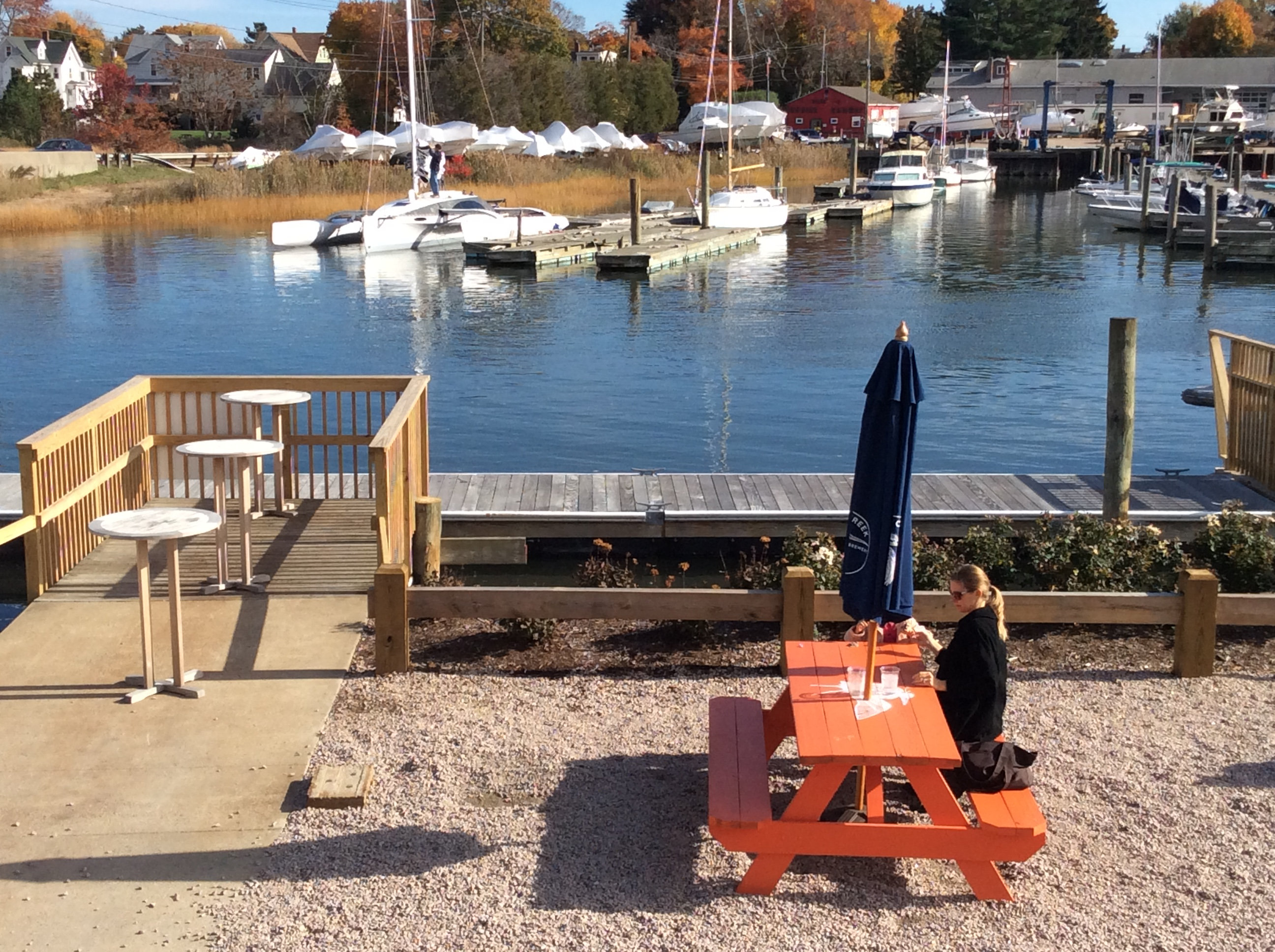
Ground level behind Stony Creek Brewery with dock and Branford River in background

The Stony Creek Brewery was a craft brewery established in 2010 by Manny Rodriguez and Peggy Crowley, located in Branford, Connecticut. Until 2012, the company produced only a small number of craft brews through a larger company, Thomas Hooker Brewery. That year, Ed Crowley, husband of co-founder Peggy Crowley, began pursuing an increase in craft brewing. Over the next three years, he re-branded Stony Creek Brewery and reopened in February 2015. Stony Creek Brewery permanently closed in August 2025 after selling their Branford location to New England Brewing Company (NEBCO)

== History ==
=== Contract production (2010–2012) ===
Prior to their re-branding, Stony Creek Brewery was a small-scale contract-produced craft brand. As a small-scale craft brand without a brewery of their own, Stony Creek had minimal options for expansion. Eventually, Crowley saw the shift in market share from large core brands to small, local craft brews, saying "I started seeing some of the more local brands coming in and taking a half a point of market share. I would sit back in my chair as an A-B [Anheuser-Busch] guy or a Heineken guy would say 'I am losing taps to local brands.' ... Dichello's core brands started to suffer and, at that point, my family and I decided that 2012 was the proper time to get out." He sold his shares of Dichello Distributors (50% of total shares) to get start up money for the re-branding of Stony Creek Brewery.

=== Re-brand & Branford Location (2012–2025) ===
Crowley worked to re-brand Stony Creek. He began by bringing in his son Ed Crowly Jr. as owner. Next, Ed Crowley Sr. worked with his former business colleague Andrew Schwartz to design the job description for the Brewmaster at Stony Creek—a job Schwartz eventually took himself. Jamal Robinson was then acquired by Crowley from Blue Point Brewing Company to become Stony Creek's Director of Sales. Finally, Crowley brought in Michael Kiser, a brand strategist. Kiser worked with Crowley to create a visual brand.

The re-branded Stony Creek Brewery opened its first facility in Branford, Connecticut in February 2015. The Indian Neck facility took four years of planning and 10 months of construction to complete. The brewery's 30,000 square feet makes it the second largest brewing facility and taproom in Connecticut, trailing only Two Roads Brewing Company in Stratford, Connecticut. There is a 2,500 square foot tasting room. According to BrewBound.com, the Stony Creek Brewery produced "more than 10,000 barrels during its first 12 months." Known mostly for their scenic location, Stony Creek Brewery was a popular destination during their time operating in Branford, CT prior to their closure in 2025.

=== Closure and Transition to New England Brewing Company (NEBCO) ===
On July 18, 2025, New England Brewing Company (NEBCO) announced, via its Instagram page, that it would be taking over the Stony Creek facility in Branford, CT. Robert Marcarelli and Jared Schulefand of Pi Restaurant Consulting-known for known for their successful establishments, Supreme Seafood and Home Restaurant-to launch NEBCO Craft Kitchen by Supreme Seafood. The menu will feature signature New England seafood favorites like lobster rolls, alongside burgers, wings, and more. Beer production will also move to Branford. As of July 18, 2025, no opening date has been announced. The NEBCO location in Woodbridge CT will remain open after the new location in Branford is open. On August 6, 2025 Stony Creek posted a single image to their Instagram account stating “permanently closed.” In this post there was no caption and they offered no explanation for their closure or thank you to the community that had supported them.

On August 13, 2025, it was announced that NECBO would open the former Stony Creek location under the NEBCO name on August 29, 2025. An on-site kitchen will be opened at a later date, with food trucks available in the interim.

== Products ==
=== Active ===
Name	Type	ABV	IBU
Cranky	IPA	6.8%	68
Big Cranky	Double IPA	9.5%	95
Little Cranky	Session IPA	4.5%	50
Dock Time	Amber Lager	4.8%	N/A
Sun Juice	Belgian Summer Ale	5.3%	N/A
Crum	Apple Cinnamon Oatmeal Amber Ale	6.2%	N/A
Snow Hole	Double Red Winter Seasonal	8.5%	85
Chahklit	Baltic Porter	8.5%	N/A
Crimsang	Soured Double IPA	9.5%	95
Reposado Negro	Black Wheat Wine	9.2%	N/A
Lichtenlizzy	Hybrid of a Berliner Weisse and a Smoked Rauch	3.5%	N/A

=== Former ===
Name	Type	ABV
Black Ale	American Black Ale	6.0%
Brewford Gold	Blonde Ale	4.6%
Nitro Black	Black IPA	6.0%
In the Red	American Amber Ale	5.3%
Nitro Belgian Blonde	Blonde Ale	6.9%
Nitro Pale Ale	Pale Ale	5.6%
Nitro Golden Rye	Rye Beer	5.8%
Creeker Xpa	Triple IPA	4.3%
Cranked	Imperial Double IPA	9.5%
BlAger	Black Lager	9.2%
Double Red	American Amber Ale	8.5%
Choc Dock	Vienna Lager	4.8%
