= Branford Center, Connecticut =

Neighborhood in Branford, Connecticut

Coordinates: 41.2783°N 72.8120°W

- Branford Center Historic District
- U.S. National Register of Historic Places
- U.S. Historic district
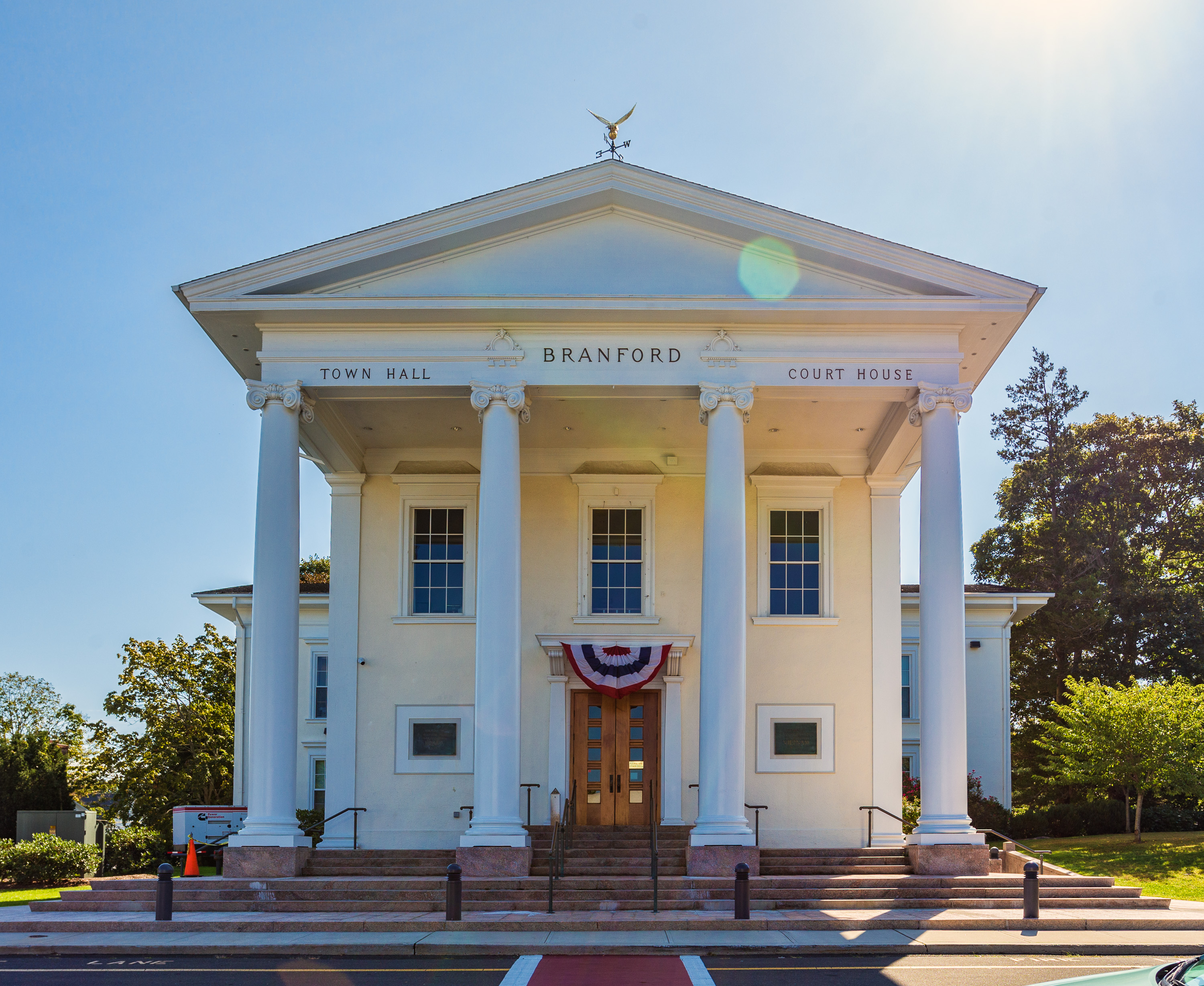
- Branford Town Hall

- Location within Connecticut Location within the United States
- Location: Roughly bounded by Route 1, Branford River on the East and South, Monroe, and Kirkham Streets, Branford, Connecticut
- Area: 250 acres (100 ha)
- Architect: Beman, S. S.; Et al.
- Architectural style: Colonial Revival, Greek Revival, Queen Anne
- NRHP reference No.: 87000636
- Added to NRHP: May 6, 1987

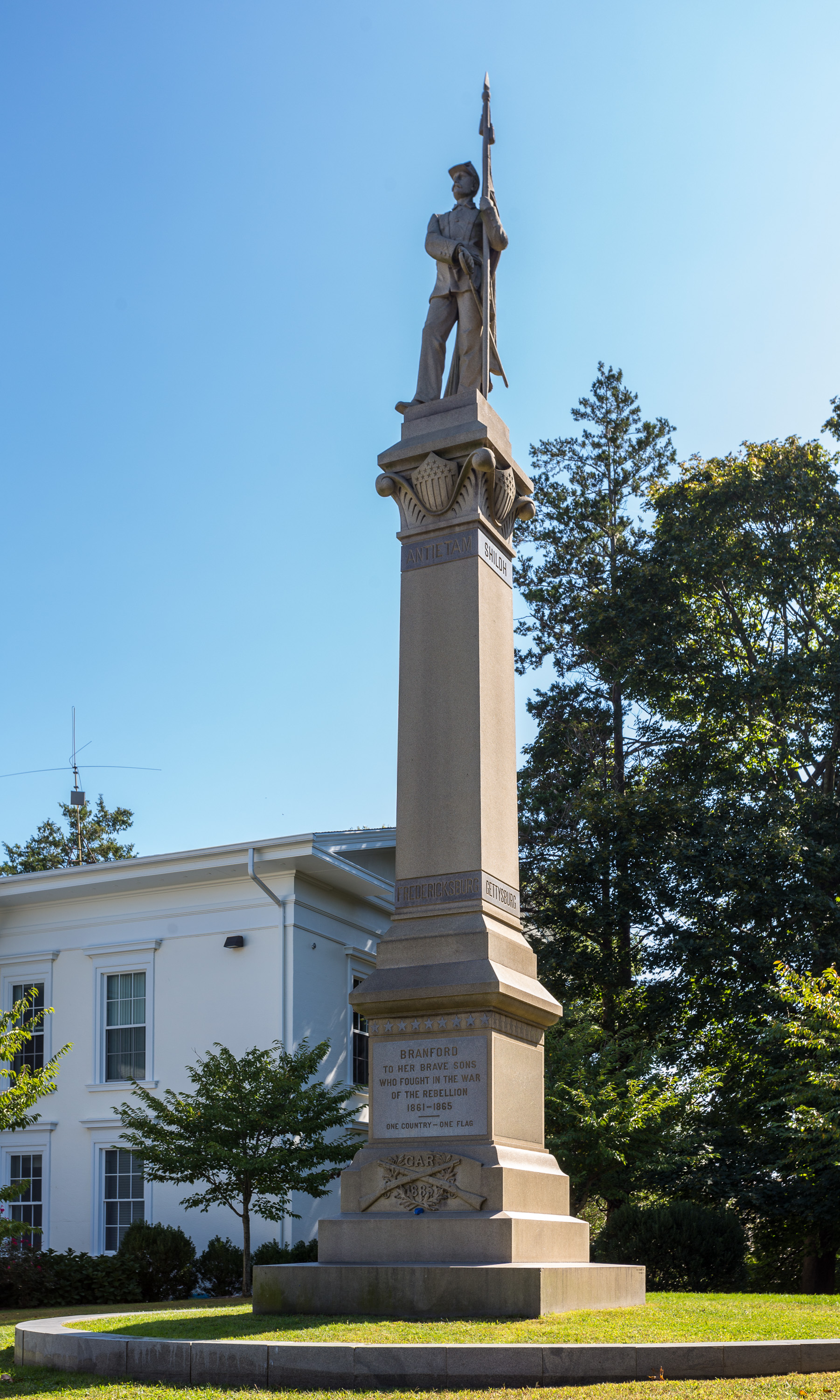
Civil War Memorial

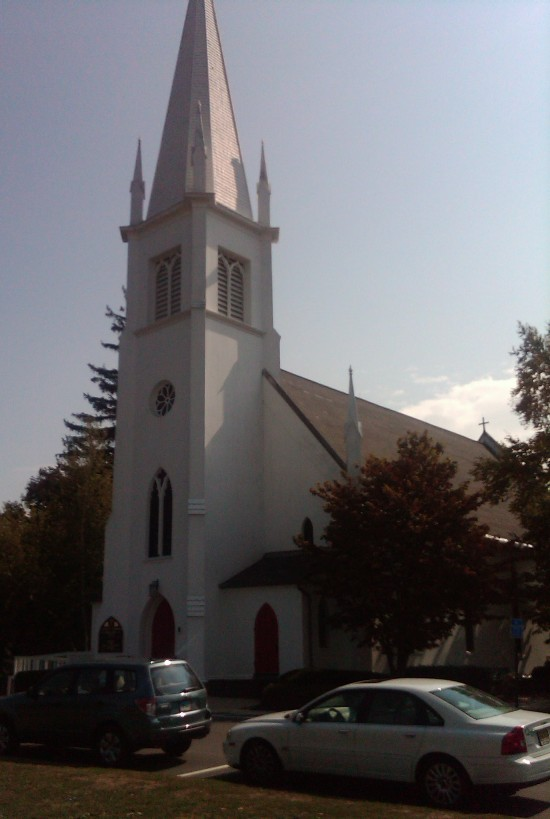
Trinity Episcopal Church

Branford Center is a neighborhood and census-designated place (CDP) in the town of Branford, Connecticut, United States. The CDP encompasses the traditional town center area (roughly the area bounded by Route 1, the Amtrak Railroad Tracks, and the Branford River) and the area known as Branford Point (the portion of the CDP South of the Railroad Tracks). As of the 2020 census, Branford Center had a population of 6,026.

== Historic district ==
The Branford Center Historic District was listed on the U.S. National Register of Historic Places in 1987. The historic district represents the area of the traditional town center and excludes Branford Point. The designated portion is an irregularly-shaped 250-acre (100 ha) area that includes 557 contributing buildings out of a total of 706 buildings in the district, including garages, carriage houses, and other structures. It includes two other contributing sites: the Center Cemetery and the Saint Mary's Roman Catholic Cemetery. The district boundaries were drawn to exclude modern construction such as the Branford High School and to exclude older buildings that did not retain their "historic architectural integrity."

Architectural styles represented in the Branford Center Historic District include Greek Revival architecture, Queen Anne architecture, and Colonial Revival architecture, Italianate architecture, Federal architecture, Gothic Revival architecture, Second Empire architecture, Colonial architecture, Tudor Revival architecture, and Bungalow architecture. These are mostly vernacular buildings. Of buildings designed by professional architects, the most significant is the "classically inspired, monumental 1893 James Blackstone Memorial Library," designed by Solon Spencer Beman of Chicago. The library incorporates Tennessee marble and features a domed, octagonal rotunda. According to the historic district nomination, "relatively little remains in Branford Center that evokes its distant 17th- and early 18th century past." The district instead includes remnants of late 19th and early 20th century industrial, commercial, and residential history.

Industry is represented in buildings of the Malleable Iron Fittings Company and the Atlantic Wire Company. Government buildings include the Branford Town Hall, from 1857, a Greek Revival building. Religious institution buildings in the district include:

- the First Baptist Church, from 1840, at 975 Main Street
- St. Mary's Roman Catholic Church's rectory from c. 1925 (contributing) and church from 1974 (non-contributing)
- First Congregational Church, at 1009 Main Street, a brick and stone building from 1843 in Greek Revival style, with Italianate addition from later in the century

== Geography ==
As defined by the U.S. Census Bureau, the boundaries of the Center extend from the Branford River north along Short Beach Road (Route 142) to Route 1 (West Main Street), then northeast along Route 1 (becoming North Main Street) to Cedar Street, north on Cedar Street to Interstate 95, and east (northbound) on I-95 to the Branford River, which forms the entire southeastern boundary of the CDP.

According to the United States Census Bureau, the CDP (which includes Branford Point in addition to the center) has a total area of 2.1 square miles (5.4 km^{2}), of which 1.9 square miles (4.9 km^{2}) is land and 0.2 square miles (0.52 km^{2}), or 10.14%, is water.

=== Branford Green ===
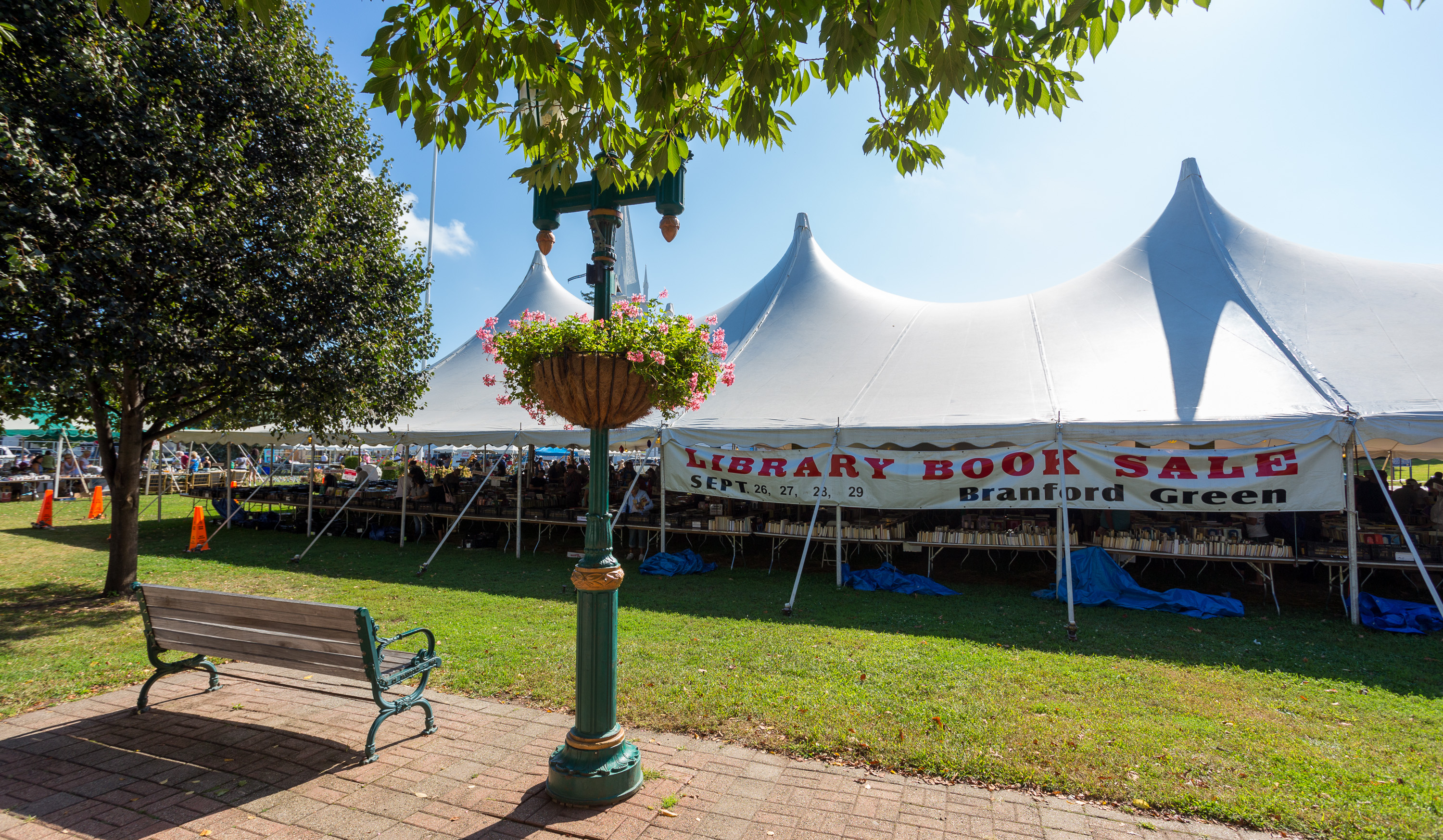
Annual book sale on the Branford Green, 2019

The green is typical of a traditional New England town, and serves as Branford's social, commercial, and governmental nerve center. It is home to many small stores, restaurants, and coffee houses, and hosts concerts and other events. Notable annual events include the Branford Festival, and the used book sale held by the Friends of the Blackstone Memorial Library.

The Branford Green is lined with churches as well as the town hall; other government facilities (such as the Branford Police Department and United States Post Office), are located on nearby Harrison Avenue. A memorial to Branford's contributions during the American Civil War is to the right of the town hall. The historic Blackstone Library is situated in the western portion of the center. It also contains five schools: St. Mary School (grades K-8), John B. Sliney (grades K-4), Mary T. Murphy, Mary Tisko and Branford High School (grades 9–12).

== Demographics ==
=== 2020 census ===
As of the 2020 census, Branford Center had a population of 6,026. The median age was 49.9 years. 12.7% of residents were under the age of 18 and 26.1% of residents were 65 years of age or older. For every 100 females there were 82.3 males, and for every 100 females age 18 and over there were 80.1 males age 18 and over.

100.0% of residents lived in urban areas, while 0.0% lived in rural areas.

There were 3,171 households in Branford Center, of which 14.5% had children under the age of 18 living in them. Of all households, 28.3% were married-couple households, 22.9% were households with a male householder and no spouse or partner present, and 40.7% were households with a female householder and no spouse or partner present. About 47.7% of all households were made up of individuals and 22.0% had someone living alone who was 65 years of age or older.

There were 3,410 housing units, of which 7.0% were vacant. The homeowner vacancy rate was 1.2% and the rental vacancy rate was 4.0%.

Racial composition as of the 2020 census
Race	Number	Percent
White	5,059	84.0%
Black or African American	166	2.8%
American Indian and Alaska Native	21	0.3%
Asian	188	3.1%
Native Hawaiian and Other Pacific Islander	0	0.0%
Some other race	187	3.1%
Two or more races	405	6.7%
Hispanic or Latino (of any race)	524	8.7%

=== 2000 census ===
As of the census of 2000, there were 5,735 people, 2,863 households, and 1,374 families residing in the CDP. The population density was 3,096.9 inhabitants per square mile (1,195.7/km^{2}). There were 2,982 housing units at an average density of 1,610.3 per square mile (621.7/km^{2}). The racial makeup of the CDP was 93.50% White, 1.24% African American, 0.24% Native American, 2.35% Asian, 0.21% Pacific Islander, 0.80% from other races, and 1.66% from two or more races. Hispanic or Latino of any race were 3.80% of the population.

There were 2,863 households, out of which 20.7% had children under the age of 18 living with them, 35.5% were married couples living together, 9.2% had a female householder with no husband present, and 52.0% were non-families. 43.9% of all households were made up of individuals, and 17.9% had someone living alone who was 65 years of age or older. The average household size was 2.00 and the average family size was 2.82.

In the CDP the population was spread out, with 17.8% under the age of 18, 6.1% from 18 to 24, 34.9% from 25 to 44, 21.5% from 45 to 64, and 19.8% who were 65 years of age or older. The median age was 40 years. For every 100 females, there were 85.2 males. For every 100 females age 18 and over, there were 80.9 males.

The median income for a household in the CDP was $45,102, and the median income for a family was $59,604. Males had a median income of $42,750 versus $35,866 for females. The per capita income for the CDP was $29,290. About 3.6% of families and 4.1% of the population were below the poverty line, including 3.5% of those under age 18 and 5.3% of those age 65 or over.

== See also ==
- National Register of Historic Places listings in New Haven County, Connecticut
