= Short Beach =

- Short Beach Historic District
- U.S. National Register of Historic Places
- U.S. Historic district
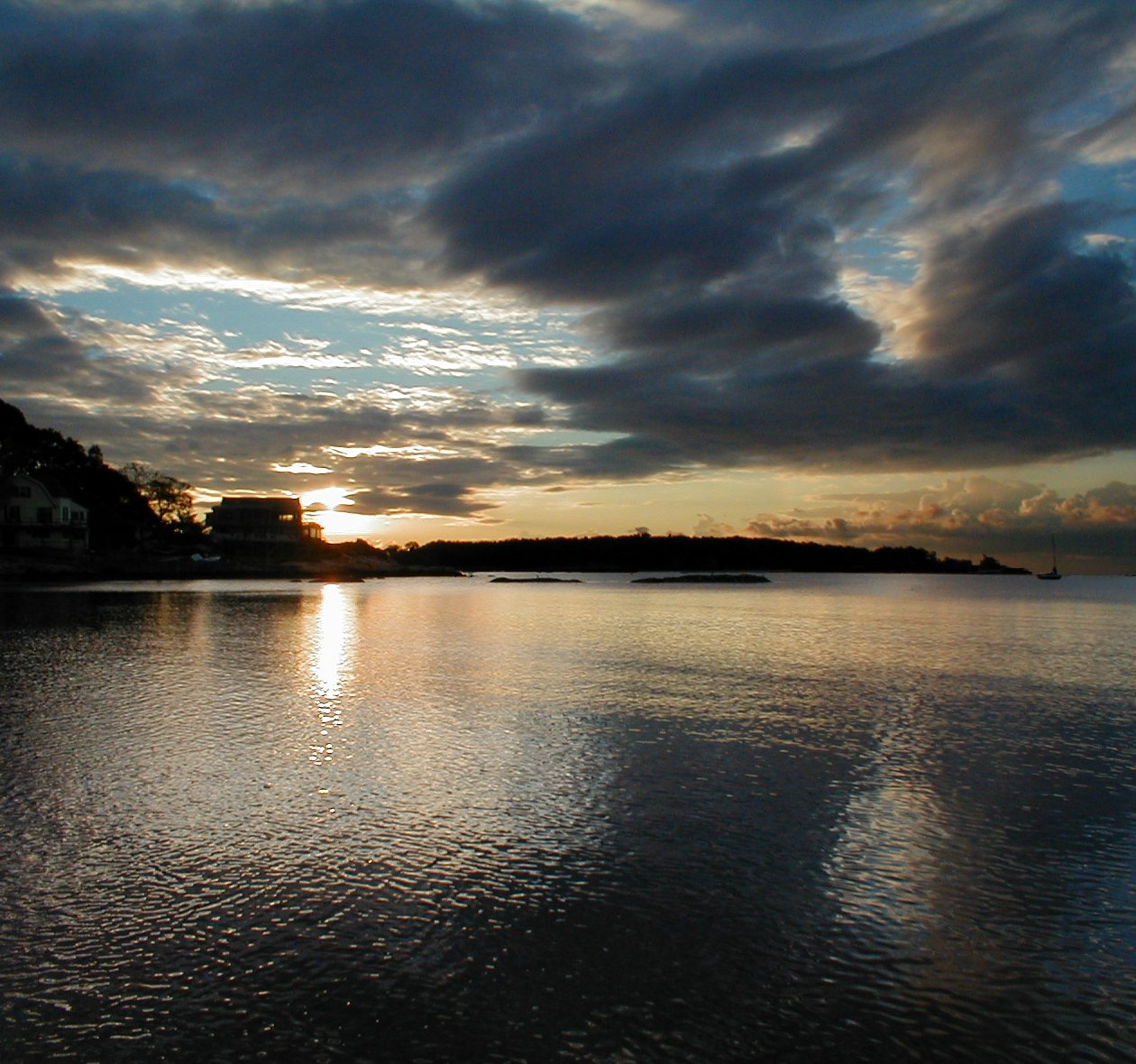
- Dawn over Short Beach

- Location within Connecticut Location within the United States
- Location: Roughly bounded by Shore Drive, Beckett & Clarke Avenues, Bungalow & Little Bay Lanes, Court, Pentecost & Bristol Streets, Branford, Connecticut
- Coordinates: 41°15′27″N 72°50′56″W
- Area: 32 acres (13 ha)
- Architectural style: Late Victorian
- NRHP reference No.: 100004544
- Added to NRHP: October 22, 2017

Short Beach is a beach neighborhood situated in Branford, Connecticut, United States. It is the westernmost of Branford's seven neighborhoods, the others being: The Hill, The Center, Pine Orchard, Stony Creek, Indian Neck, and Brushy Hill. Short Beach's population is approximately 2,500. Approximately one-half mile long, it is situated in New Haven County and is bordered by East Haven to the west, Branford to the north and east and Long Island Sound to the south. It is home to many small islands, the largest being Kelsey's Island which has a few small cabins used as summer homes.

Short Beach was once a thriving shoreline vacation village that became a year-round neighborhood starting in the late 1950s. Today, Short Beach is a fast-growing area, with an economically diverse population and a large police presence. There has been immigration to Short Beach and the New Haven area in general from the former Yugoslavia as well as from the Caribbean. Cottage restoration has led to a renewed urban environment and overall visual aesthetic.

The central portion of the Short Beach neighborhood was listed on the National Register of Historic Places as the Short Beach Historic District in 2017.

== Attractions ==
Short Beach is home to half of the famous Shore Line Trolley Museum, which is also in neighboring East Haven. Also in Short Beach are the Yale Corinthian Yacht Club (YCYC), Shore Automotive, the Adult Day Care Center, Short Beach Church, the local fire house, which houses and is owned by Short Beach Hose, Hook and Ladder Volunteer Company 4 of the Branford Fire Department, as well as a U. S. Post Office. Short Beach has three parks, the largest being Pardee Park in the center. Short Beach has a three-day festival at the end of summer called Short Beach Days with a parade, lip-synching contest, races, basketball, and sand castle building.

New Haven CT Transit F3, F5 and F6 buses run through Short Beach connecting the neighborhood to East Haven, New Haven, downtown Branford and go as far as Seymour and Ansonia.

Short Beach is known for a population of monk parakeets that live there. It is said that they escaped from captivity and never left the neighborhood. The parrots took up residence in the community's trees and can be heard and seen all year long.

== History ==
Short Beach was occupied by the Quinnipiac and possibly the Paugussett tribes in the 17th century but this information is still disputed. It became part of Branford when the town was established in 1644. The area remained largely undeveloped until the post-Civil War period, when it began a slow development as a summer resort area. By the 1890s the area featured a hotel and a number of seasonal and year-round residences along Beckett Avenue. From 1891 until she died in 1919, poet Ella Wheeler Wilcox lived on the Short Beach coast overlooking Granite Bay. Wilcox was influential in promoting the area, and its growth was assured when the Branford Electric Railway ran its line near Short Beach in 1897. The area's popularity as a summer resort area peaked in the early 1920s, after which it was subjected to increasing suburbanization.

== Environment ==
- Short Beach has a temperate climate and has hot summers and cold winters.
- Many oak trees, apple trees, prickly pear, pines and maples grow in the area.
- Common animals in the area include monk parakeets, known locally as "Short Beach parrots," raccoons, mice, possums, skunks, gulls, pigeons, common terns, ducks, deer, coyotes, bobcats, turkeys and chickens. Cornsnakes also live in some Short Beach areas.
