= Branford, Connecticut =

- Town
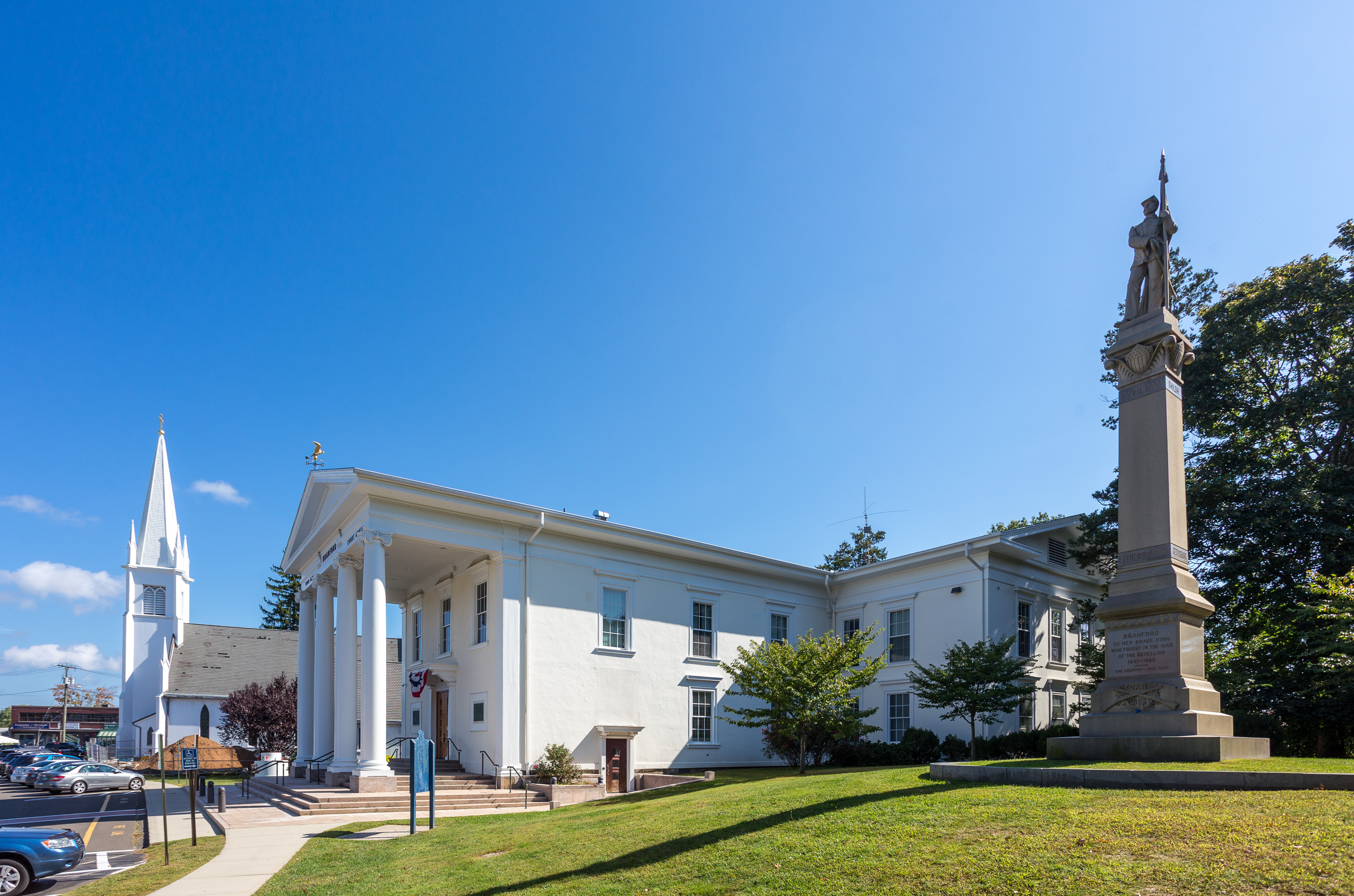
- Town Green

- Seal

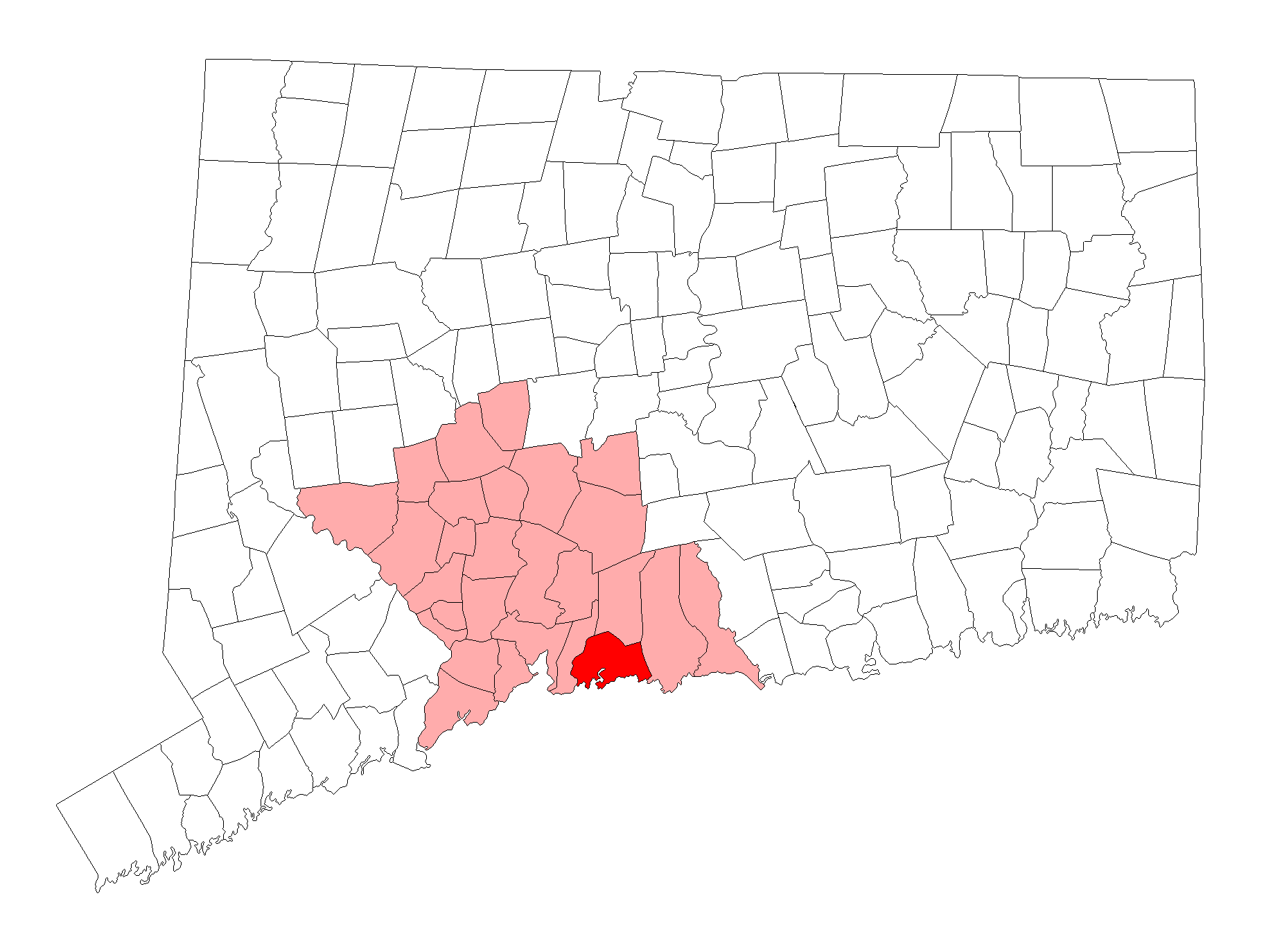
- Interactive map of Branford, Connecticut
- Coordinates: 41°16′40″N 72°47′59″W
- Country: United States
- U.S. state: Connecticut
- County: New Haven
- Region: South Central CT
- Settled: 1644
- Incorporated: 1685

Government
  - Type: Representative town meeting
  - First selectman: Joshua Brooks (D)
  - Selectman: Ray Dunbar (D)
  - Selectman: Jeffrey E. Vailette (R)

Area
  - Total: 28.0 sq mi (72.5 km^{2})
  - Land: 22.0 sq mi (56.9 km^{2})
  - Water: 6.0 sq mi (15.6 km^{2})
- Elevation: 43 ft (13 m)

Population (2020)
  - Total: 28,273
  - Density: 1,290/sq mi (497/km^{2})
- Demonym: Branfordite
- Time zone: UTC−5 (Eastern)
  - Summer (DST): UTC−4 (Eastern)
- ZIP code: 06405
- Area codes: 203/475
- FIPS code: 09-07310
- GNIS feature ID: 0213395
- Website: www.branford-ct.gov

Branford is a shoreline town located on Long Island Sound in New Haven County, Connecticut, United States, about 6 miles (10 km) east of downtown New Haven. The town is part of the South Central Connecticut Planning Region. Branford borders East Haven to the west, Guilford to the east, and North Branford to the north. The population was 28,273 in the 2020 census.

== Geography ==
According to the United States Census Bureau, the town has a total area of 28.0 square miles (73 km^{2}); 22.0 square miles (57 km^{2}) are land and 6.0 square miles (16 km^{2}) (21.5%) are water, including the Branford River, Queach Brook and the Branford Supply Ponds. There are two harbors, the more central Branford Harbor and Stony Creek Harbor on the east end, and one town beach at Branford Point. Much of the town's border with East Haven to the west is dominated by Lake Saltonstall, a reservoir owned by the South Central Connecticut Regional Water Authority, and Saltonstall Mountain, part of the Metacomet Ridge, a mountainous trap rock ridgeline that stretches from Long Island Sound to nearly the Vermont border. The southern terminus of the Metacomet Ridge, Beacon Hill, is located in Branford.

The town of Branford includes the Thimble Islands. Neighboring towns are North Branford to the north, Guilford to the east, and East Haven to the west.

== History ==
An area called Totoket, which became Branford, was part of the land bought from the Mattabesech Indians in 1638 by the first English settlers of New Haven. Previously, the Dutch in the New Netherland settlements set up a trading post at the mouth of the Branford River in the 17th century, the source of the name "Dutch Wharf", also known as "Dutch House Wharf" and the Dutch House Quarter. The area was also described by Ezra Stiles as containing a "Dutch Fort", as hinted at by archaeological excavations completed in the 1990s.

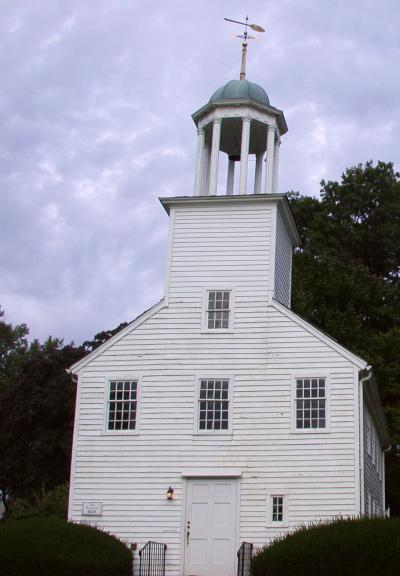
The historic Academy building

The town's name is said to be derived from the town of Brentford, England. The town in early maps was called Brentford before being shortened to Branford. Established in 1644, Branford grew during the 18th and 19th centuries. In the late 18th century, the first shoreline community, Stony Creek, was settled. Indian Neck and Pine Orchard were also settled, but neither of those settlements was permanent until the mid-19th century.

In 1852, the railroad helped bring new business, including Branford Lockworks, Malleable Iron Fittings Company, and the Atlantic Wire Company. The Stony Creek granite quarries also rose to prominence as a direct consequence of railroad construction.

During the mid-19th century, Branford became a popular resort area. Approximately twenty hotels opened, including Indian Point House in Stony Creek, Montowese House in Indian Neck, and Sheldon House in Pine Orchard. During the mid-20th century, Branford shed its resort image. It developed with many characteristics typically associated with northeastern suburbs.

== Climate ==
Climate data for Branford, Connecticut
Month	Jan	Feb	Mar	Apr	May	Jun	Jul	Aug	Sep	Oct	Nov	Dec	Year
Record high °F (°C)	68 (20)	68 (20)	80 (27)	92 (33)	96 (36)	98 (37)	100 (38)	99 (37)	98 (37)	88 (31)	80 (27)	76 (24)	100 (38)
Mean daily maximum °F (°C)	38 (3)	39 (4)	48 (9)	59 (15)	70 (21)	79 (26)	84 (29)	82 (28)	75 (24)	64 (18)	52 (11)	43 (6)	61 (16)
Mean daily minimum °F (°C)	25 (−4)	26 (−3)	33 (1)	41 (5)	51 (11)	61 (16)	68 (20)	66 (19)	59 (15)	49 (9)	40 (4)	31 (−1)	46 (8)
Record low °F (°C)	−8 (−22)	−8 (−22)	8 (−13)	18 (−8)	32 (0)	40 (4)	47 (8)	45 (7)	37 (3)	24 (−4)	12 (−11)	−1 (−18)	−8 (−22)
Average precipitation inches (mm)	4.59 (117)	3.24 (82)	4.65 (118)	4.53 (115)	4.70 (119)	4.44 (113)	4.28 (109)	4.5 (110)	4.65 (118)	4.54 (115)	4.47 (114)	4.03 (102)	52.62 (1,332)

== Landmarks and attractions ==
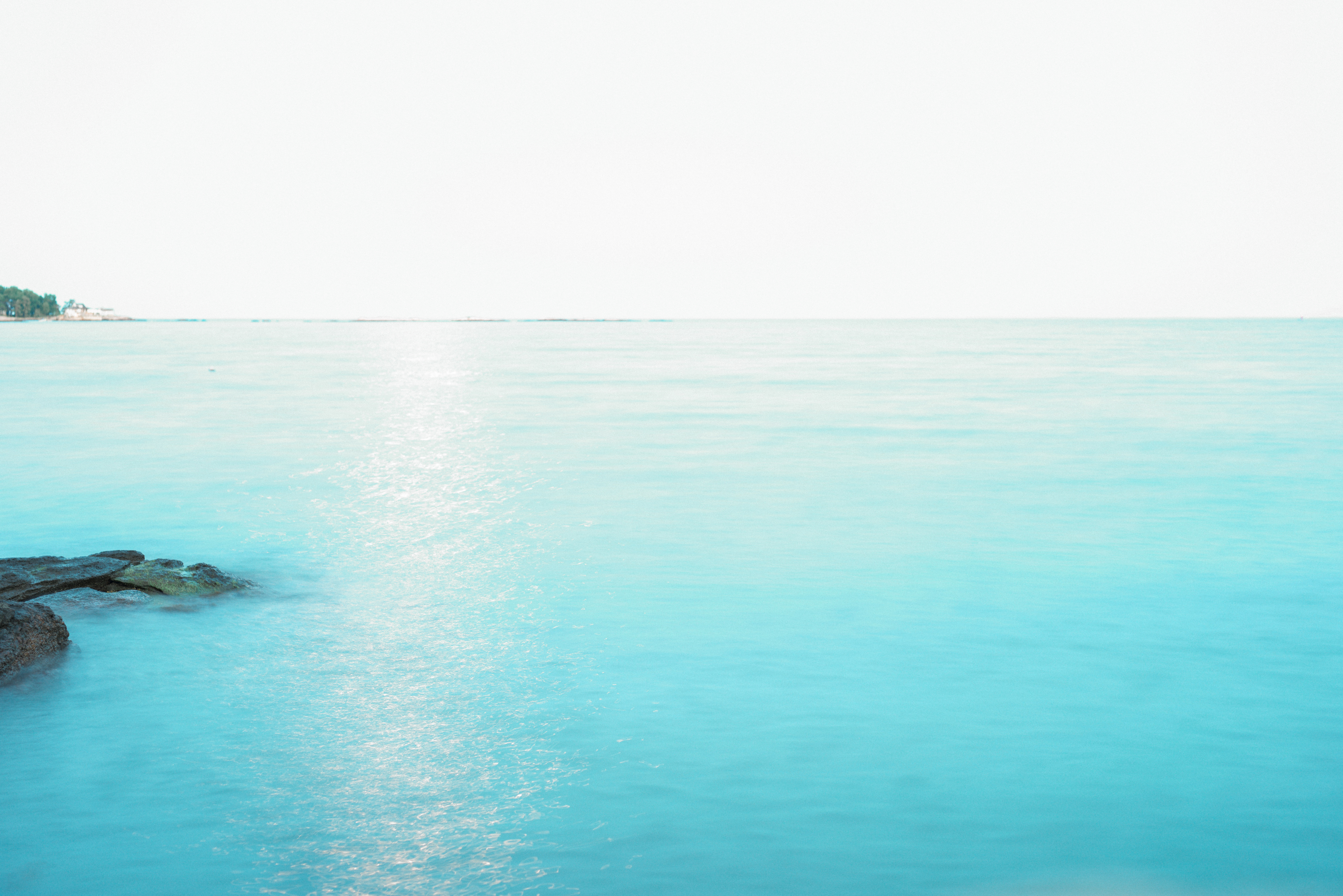
A beach in Branford, Connecticut, near Shore Drive.

Seven historic districts in Branford are listed on the National Register of Historic Places: Branford Center, Branford Point, Branford Electric Railway, Canoe Brook, Route 146, Short Beach, and Stony Creek–Thimble Islands. These include buildings in Federal, Arts and Crafts, and Queen Anne styles of architecture.

More than 20 historic homes and other properties are separately listed on the National Register. In total, 30 properties or districts in Branford appear in New Haven County's NRHP listings. One example is Harrison House and Museum, a 1724 structure, which has period furnishings, local historical items, archives, a barn and an herb garden.

Cruises of the Thimble Islands depart from the Stony Creek dock, and seal-watch cruises take place in March.

Branford's recreational facilities include several town-maintained parks and beaches owned by private foundations, hiking trails along Lake Saltonstall and a stretch of the Shoreline Greenway Trail, and 20 miles (32 km) of coastline with more than 12 marinas.

== Demographics ==
Historical population
Census	Pop.	Note	%±
1820	1,180		—
1850	1,423		—
1860	2,123		49.2%
1870	2,488		17.2%
1880	3,047		22.5%
1890	4,460		46.4%
1900	5,706		27.9%
1910	6,047		6.0%
1920	6,627		9.6%
1930	7,022		6.0%
1940	8,060		14.8%
1950	10,944		35.8%
1960	16,610		51.8%
1970	20,444		23.1%
1980	23,363		14.3%
1990	27,603		18.1%
2000	28,683		3.9%
2010	28,026		−2.3%
2020	28,273		0.9%
U.S. Decennial Census

As of the census of 2000, there were 28,683 people, 12,543 households, and 7,663 families residing in the town. The population density was 1,305.2 inhabitants per square mile (503.9/km^{2}). There were 13,342 housing units at an average density of 607.1 per square mile (234.4/km^{2}). The racial makeup of the town was 94.05% white, 1.35% African American, 0.10% Native American, 2.72% Asian, 0.06% Pacific Islander, 0.53% from other races, and 1.20% from two or more races. Hispanic or Latino of any race were 2.57% of the population.

There were 12,543 households, out of which 25.7% had children under the age of 18 living with them, 47.9% were married couples living together, 9.8% had a female householder with no husband present, and 38.9% were non-families. 32.4% of all households were made up of individuals, and 11.6% had someone living alone who was 65 years of age or older. The average household size was 2.26 and the average family size was 2.90.

In the town, the population was spread out, with 20.7% under the age of 18, 5.4% from 18 to 24, 30.5% from 25 to 44, 26.6% from 45 to 64, and 16.9% who were 65 years of age or older. The median age was 41 years. For every 100 females, there were 88.9 males. For every 100 females age 18 and over, there were 85.2 males.

The median income for a household in the town was $58,009, and the median income for a family was $69,510. Males had a median income of $46,927 versus $35,947 for females. The per capita income for the town was $32,301. About 3.3% of families and 4.1% of the population were below the poverty line, including 3.9% of those under the age of 18 and 4.0% of those 65 and older.

Voter registration and party enrollment as of October 31, 2024
Party	Active voters	Inactive voters	Total voters	Percentage
Democratic	7,119	733	7,852	33.47%
Republican	4,150	369	4,519	19.26%
Unaffiliated	9,263	1,495	10,758	45.85%
Minor parties	288	46	334	1.42%
Total	20,820	2,643	23,463	100%

Presidential Election Results
Year	Democratic	Republican	Third Parties
2024	56.8% 9,898	41.6% 7,251	1.5% 276
2020	59.0% 10,562	39.6% 7,098	1.4% 253
2016	54.2% 8,453	42.3% 6,585	3.5% 545
2012	58.2% 8,301	40.8% 5,817	1.0% 144
2008	59.8% 9,062	38.9% 5,906	1.3% 176
2004	56.2% 8,338	42.3% 6,286	1.5% 221
2000	57.8% 8,302	35.7% 5,133	6.5% 930
1996	53.9% 7,077	33.2% 4,356	12.9% 1,704
1992	43.1% 6,575	36.8% 5,622	20.1% 3,066
1988	45.3% 6,007	53.3% 7,068	1.4% 178
1984	36.4% 4,679	63.2% 8,118	0.4% 51
1980	32.7% 3,827	54.9% 6,432	12.4% 1,447
1976	42.6% 4,886	56.5% 6,487	0.9% 92
1972	34.1% 3,775	64.7% 7,174	1.2% 134
1968	43.6% 4,280	49.9% 4,907	6.5% 632
1964	61.7% 5,664	38.3% 3,520	0.00% 0
1960	46.8% 4,161	53.2% 4,731	0.00% 0
1956	34.2% 2,604	65.8% 5,009	0.00% 0

== Principal communities in Branford ==
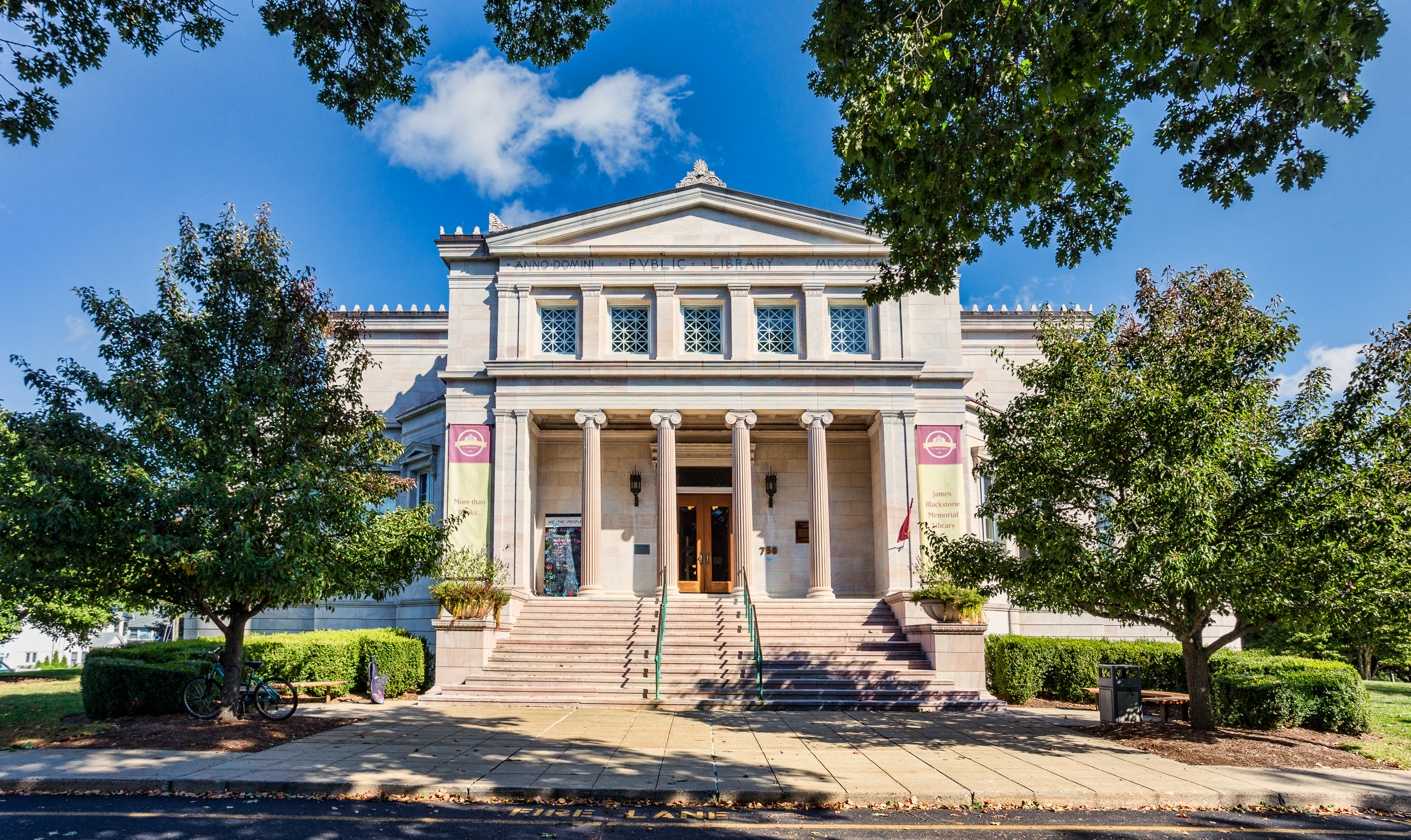
James Blackstone Memorial Library

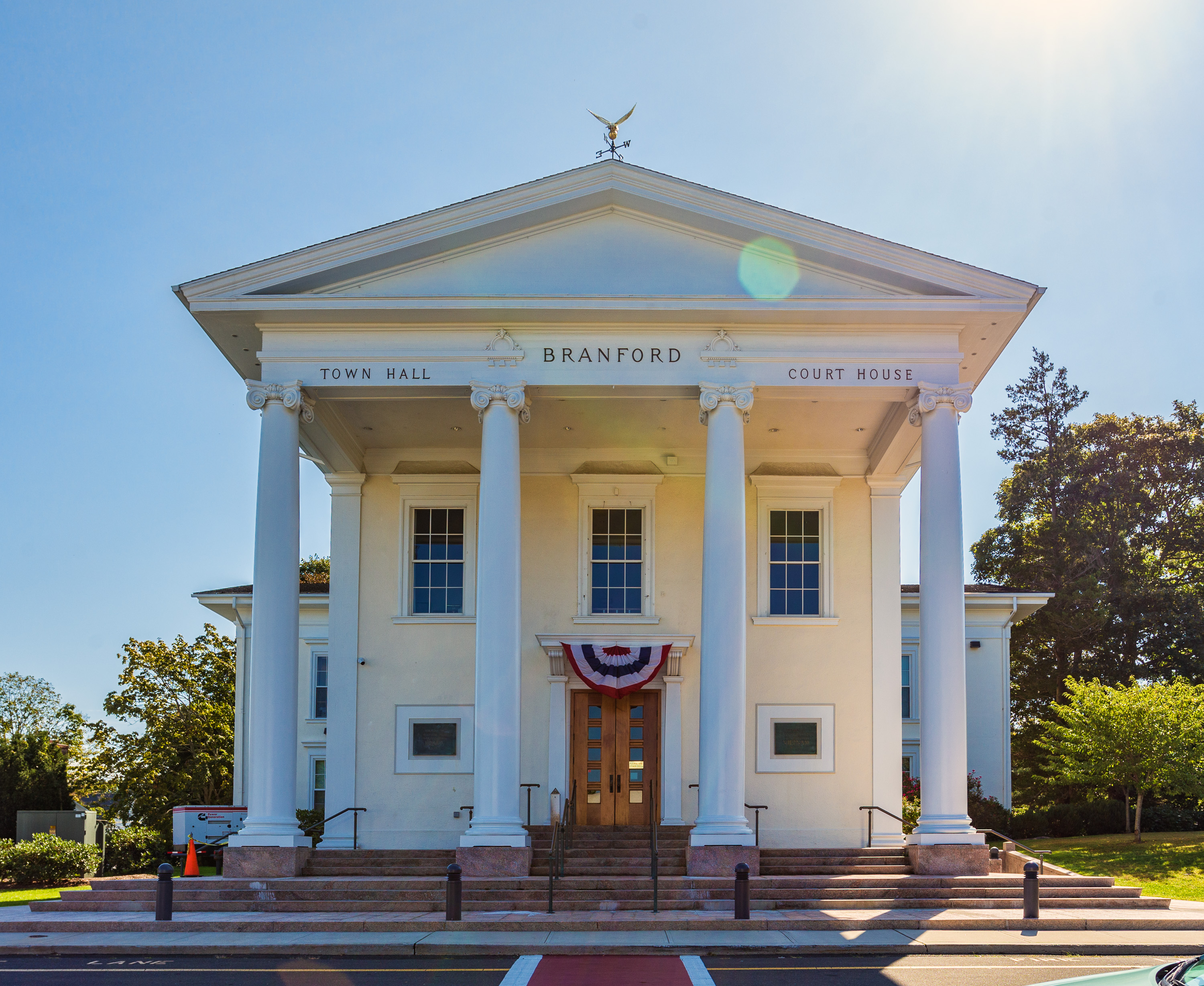
Town Hall

=== Branford Center ===
Branford Center is home to many small stores, restaurants, and coffee houses, which line Main Street, with the Green at the center. The Branford Green has churches as well as the town hall and other government facilities and hosts concerts and other events, such as the annual Branford Festival. Traditionally, the graduating class from Branford High School graduates in front of the Town Hall, weather permitting.

=== Branford Hill ===
Branford Hill sits on the western end of town and centers on the heavily commercialized strip of U.S. Route 1. Fast-food and sit-down restaurants, auto dealers, grocery stores, and several strip malls are located there. The southern section is less dense, with woodlands and farm featuring trails preserved by the Branford Land Trust. These trails connect the Shoreline Greenway Trail from New Haven to Madison. The northern section also features a less dense area, with woodlands that surround Lake Saltonstall. These woodlands feature trail systems maintained by the Regional Water Authority, as the Lake is a reservoir for Branford.

Branford Hill features many condominium and apartment complexes. The original site of Connecticut Hospice (now the Monastery of the Glorious Cross—a semi-cloistered community of Benedictine nuns) is located in this area, on Burban Drive. Also on Burban Drive is St. Elizabeth of Hungary Roman Catholic Church, which was originally located in Short Beach.

=== Indian Neck ===
Indian Neck is in the south-central section of Branford, dominated by a peninsula bordering Branford Harbor. Both Foote Park and John B. Sliney Memorial Park are located within Indian Neck.

In the early to mid 20th century Indian Neck was a tourist destination. Trolley service came down to Sybil and Limewood avenues, which had its own commercial area. These included Harry's General Store, Bud's Bait Box, and on Limewood Avenue the Waverly Inn, Madelyn's Restaurant, Surfside Restaurant, a news, comics, candy, variety store named Lounsberry's, and Dairy Joy Ice Cream. Much of the area contained second homes, so the beach was an active place. As the area became more year-round the commercial business slowly shut down. The Montasco Inn, owned and operated for many years by the Poirots was torn down in the 1960s. The landmark Waverly Inn was destroyed by a fire in the early 1970s.

Indian Neck – Pine Orchard Volunteer Fire Company 9 is located here.

In February 2015, Stony Creek Brewery, named after the Stony Creek area of Branford, opened its doors here.

=== Pine Orchard ===
Pine Orchard is situated between Indian Neck and Stony Creek. It is home to the Pine Orchard Yacht and Country Club and Francis Walsh Intermediate School. Notable residents include Dr. Nicholas Perricone and Edward M. Kennedy, Jr.

=== Stony Creek ===
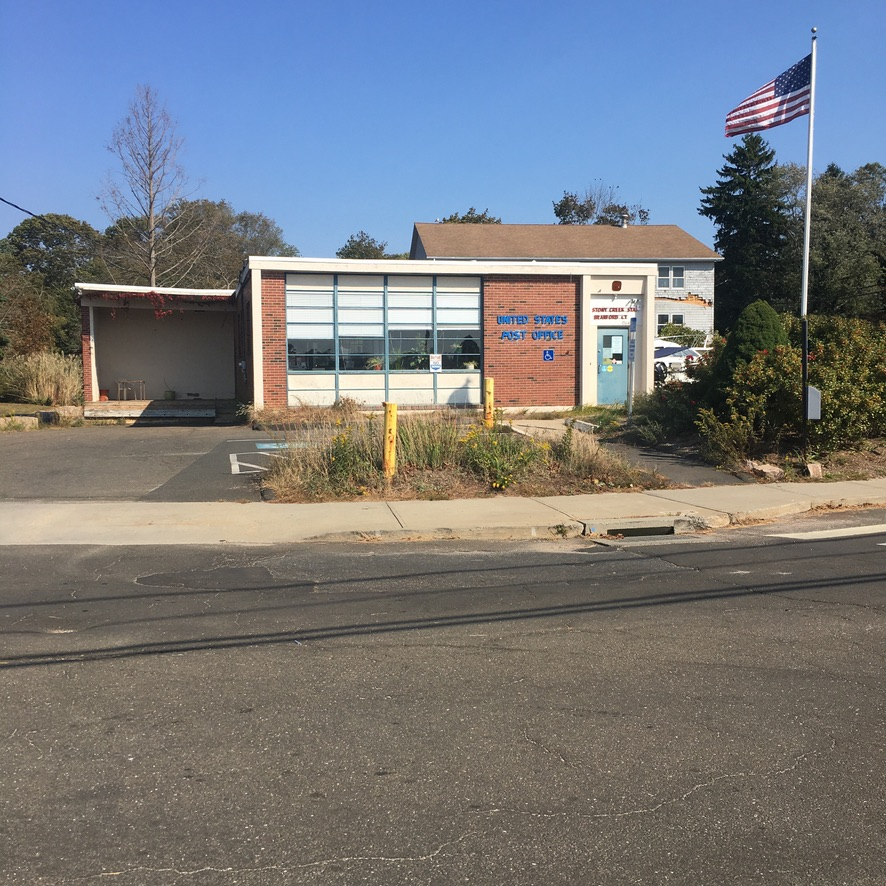
Stony Creek Post Office

Stony Creek is a shore front neighborhood in the southeastern section of Branford, centered on a harbor on Long Island Sound. An eclectic community, Stony Creek has the ambiance of a small seaside village with a blend of various architectural style buildings and a few small retail establishments, sandwich shops, galleries, and an antique shop.

Just offshore from Stony Creek is an archipelago of islands known as the Thimble Islands. The Thimbles are a jumble of glacial rocks, ranging from 17 acres (6.9 ha) down to stepping-stone size, at the mouth of the harbor. Despite their small size, they possess a wealth of history and local lore, as well as providing pleasant scenery for a summer cruise.

Stony Creek is home to the all-male Stony Creek Fife & Drum Corps, and the only all-female fife and drum corps, Totoket Ancient Fife & Drum Corps.

A large quarry is still working and supplied the distinctive pink/orange Stony Creek granite for the Brooklyn Bridge (Although this contradicts linked page "The granite blocks were quarried and shaped on Vinalhaven Island, Maine, under a contract with the Bodwell Granite Company, and delivered from Maine to New York by schooner. ), the base of the Statue of Liberty, and the newest House Office Building in Washington, D.C. Granite from Stony Creek was chosen to be used in New York City's Statue of Liberty museum, which opened in May 2019.

Stony Creek Fire and Rescue Company 5 is located here.

=== Short Beach ===
Short Beach is a beach neighborhood in the western end of town, south of Branford Hill. It is home to many small private islands, the largest being Kelsey Island, which has a handful of small cabins used as summer homes. There is no public access (except for public tidal zones) to Kelsey Island and trespassing is not allowed. Short Beach is home to half of the famous Shore Line Trolley Museum, which is also in neighboring East Haven. Also in Short Beach are the Yale Corinthian Yacht Club (YCYC), Short Beach Union Church and three parks, the largest being Pardee Park. Short Beach's population is about 1,500 and features a three-day festival at the end of summer called Short Beach Days. Short Beach is known for the population of monk parakeets that live there (referred to as the "Short Beach Parrots"), a non-native bird.

Short Beach Hose, Hook and Ladder Company 4, founded in 1911, is located here.

=== Hotchkiss Grove ===
Hotchkiss Grove of Branford is located between Indian Neck and Pine Orchard and consists of First through Ninth avenues, as well as parts of Hotchkiss Grove Road, Seaview Avenue, and Dudley Avenue. It has a small beach used for swimming and mooring boats and features a raft to swim out to. Bay Point Park (The Point) is a grassy peninsula going out into the water where there used to be a small pier. Occasionally residents of Hotchkiss Grove can rent the Point to host parties. Every first Saturday of August, Hotchkiss Grove Day is held, with the day starting with a costume parade, games, and prizes. In the afternoon there are beach games in which kids compete with one another on the beach, a clam bar, and live music. Dinner, a raffle, auction, and dancing close out the evening. Historically, Hotchkiss Grove was a summer community with beach cottages and dirt roads; over the past two decades most of the cottages have been converted into permanent, year round residences.

== Industry ==
Now that Malleable Iron Fittings has been largely demolished and the site turned into housing, Branford is known for high-technology and pharmaceutical companies such as 454 Life Sciences and Durata Therapeutics, a pharmaceutical company focused on the development and commercialization of differentiated therapeutic solutions for physicians and providers to advance patient care in infectious disease and acute illnesses. Also with offices and manufacturing space in Branford is American Polyfilm, Inc., which specializes in the manufacture of polyurethane film for a number of industries including industrial and high performance fabrics and medical products to name a few. Wilson Arms is in Branford, a company that produces small-caliber rifles and parts. Within the town are also two large glazing and window construction companies, Massey's Plate Glass & Aluminum and Cherry Hill Glass. Branford is also home to Autac, Inc. which has been manufacturing high quality coiled cords since 1947.

== Education ==
Schools in Branford:

- Branford High School
- Francis Walsh Intermediate School
- John B. Sliney School
- Linda Chipkin School
- Mary R. Tisko School
- Mary T. Murphy School
- East Shoreline Catholic Academy

== Transportation ==
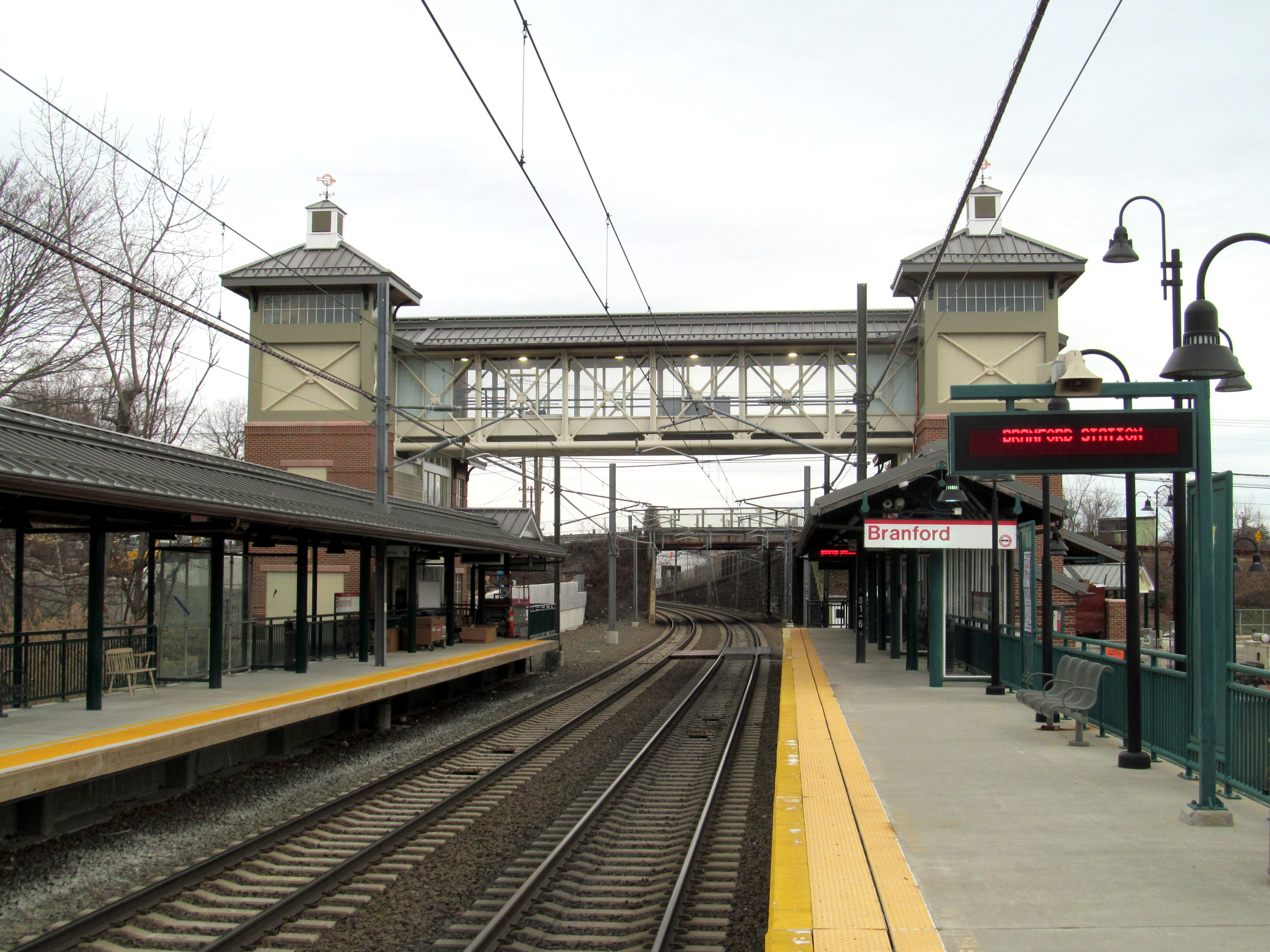
Branford train station is served by Shore Line East

The main artery through the town is Interstate 95, running along the eastern coast of the United States. The town has a station on the Shore Line East commuter rail line from New London to New Haven.

The Branford Steam Railroad carries quarried trap rock from North Branford to barges at Juniper Point near Stony Creek. Tweed New Haven Regional Airport is located 3 miles (5 km) west of Branford.

=== Major roads ===
- West Main Street/North Main Street/East Main Street (U.S. Route 1) – parallels I-95. Main Street passes through the town center.
- Connecticut Route 142 (Short Beach Road/Shore Drive) serves the community of Short Beach in the southwestern part of the town.
- Connecticut Route 146 is a scenic route that passes through various coastal communities in the southeastern part of the town and into Guilford. The route runs closely parallel to the Amtrak/Shore Line East railroad tracks.
- Cedar Street/Brushy Plain Road runs from Main Street into North Branford. The section north of Route 1 is an unsigned state road (SR 740). A large number of condominium complexes are located on SR 740 or one of its side roads. Mary T. Murphy Elementary School, Veterans Memorial Park and Lidyhites Pond are also located on the section known as Brushy Plain Road. The road takes a winding route over a hill popularly known as "Snake Hill", site of numerous traffic accidents, as it heads north into North Branford.

== Culture ==
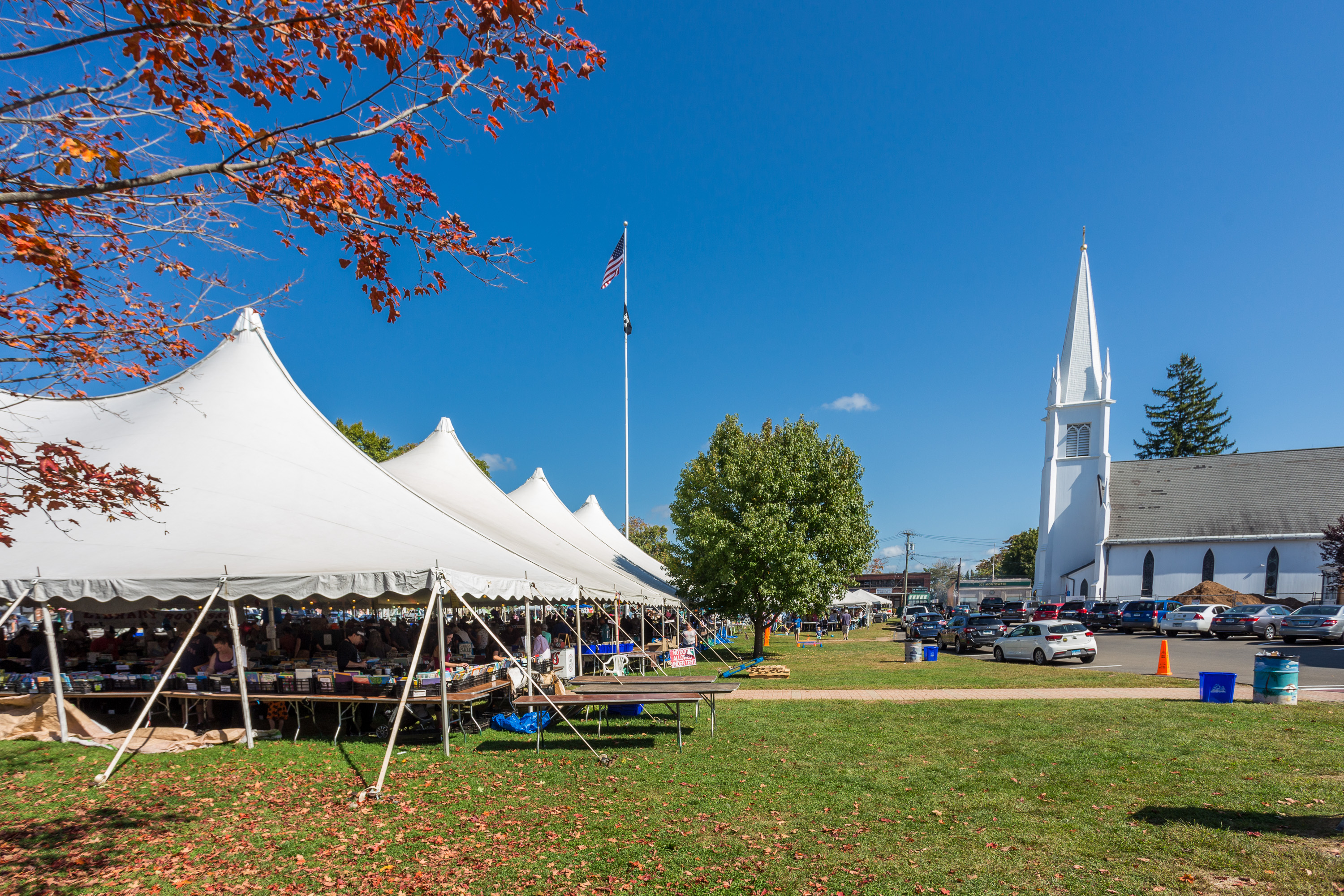
The annual Branford Book Sale

One of the largest events in Branford every year is the Branford Festival on Father's Day weekend, which features food, crafts, children's rides, music and a 5-mile (8.0 km) road race.

A book sale is held annually each autumn on the Branford Green to raise money for the town library.

== Notable people ==
- Jacob M. Appel, novelist and bioethicist
- Bob Barthelson, major league baseball player
- King Donovan (1918–1987), actor
- Skylar Dunn, American actress
- Bob DuPuy, president and chief operating officer of Major League Baseball (MLB)
- Selma Engel-Wijnberg (1922–2018), Holocaust survivor
- Todd English, celebrity chef
- Ron Glick, soccer player
- Rutherford Hayes, grandfather of President Rutherford B. Hayes, was born in Branford in 1756
- Levi Jackson, first African American captain of an Ivy League Football team during time at Yale
- Edward Kennedy Jr. (Ted), State Senator, son of United States Senator Ted Kennedy
- Henry Lee, forensic scientist
- Herman Lubinsky, owner of Savoy Records
- Henry Ludington, father of American Revolutionary War figure Sybil Ludington
- Beauty McGowan, MLB baseball player
- Greg Nobile, Tony Award winning Broadway producer
- Norodom Yuvaneath, first born son of Norodom Sihanouk of Cambodia
- Mike Olt, MLB baseball player
- Henry Bradley Plant, railroad magnate
- Ollie Sax, MLB baseball player
- Joseph Stamler (1911–1988), New Jersey Superior Court judge and professor at Rutgers University
- Thomas Steitz, 2009 Nobel laureate in chemistry
- Beverly Willis (1928–2023), pioneering American architect and designer of the San Francisco Ballet Building

== Sister City ==
- Brentford, England
