= Connecticut Route 80 =

State highway in south-central Connecticut, US

Route 80
- Map of southern Connecticut with Route 80 highlighted in red

Route information
- Maintained by CTDOT
- Length: 25.91 mi (41.70 km)
- Existed: 1932–present

Major junctions
- West end: I-91 / Route 17 in New Haven
- Route 77 in Guilford; Route 9 in Deep River
- East end: Route 154 in Deep River

Location
- Country: United States
- State: Connecticut
- Counties: New Haven, Middlesex

Highway system
- Connecticut State Highway System; Interstate; US; State; SSR; SR; Scenic
← Route 79	→ Route 81

Connecticut Route 80 is a 25.9 mile highway that runs through south-central Connecticut. The route runs from Interstate 91 (I-91) in Quinnipiac Meadows neighborhood of New Haven east to Route 154 in Deep River. Route 80 runs within 5 miles of many town squares- including Downtown New Haven.

== Route description ==
Route 80 begins at the junction of I-91 and Route 17 in New Haven (at exit 8). Route 17 splits off and heads northward right after the exit. Route 80 begins as a 4-lane principal arterial road in New Haven, continuing due east for almost its entire length. It has a junction with the southern end of Route 103 before entering East Haven. It then passes the north end of Route 100 before crossing into North Branford. In North Branford, it has a 1.50 miles (2.41 km) overlap with Route 22, during which it meets the north end of Route 139. Just east of the Route 22 concurrency, Route 80 becomes a 2 lane minor rural arterial road and enters Guilford. It crosses Route 77 in North Guilford before entering Madison. In the village of North Madison, it meets Route 79 at a roundabout. It then enters Killingworth, where it passes Chatfield Hollow State Park and intersects with Route 81 at a traffic circle in the center of town. After crossing into Deep River, it briefly overlaps with Route 145, then meets Route 9 at exit 7 about 0.6 miles (0.97 km) before its terminus at Route 154.

Route 80 crosses over the Hammonasset River between Madison and Killingworth on Bridge No. 1132, a historic open-spandrel arch bridge built by the Connecticut Highway Department in 1934.

== History ==
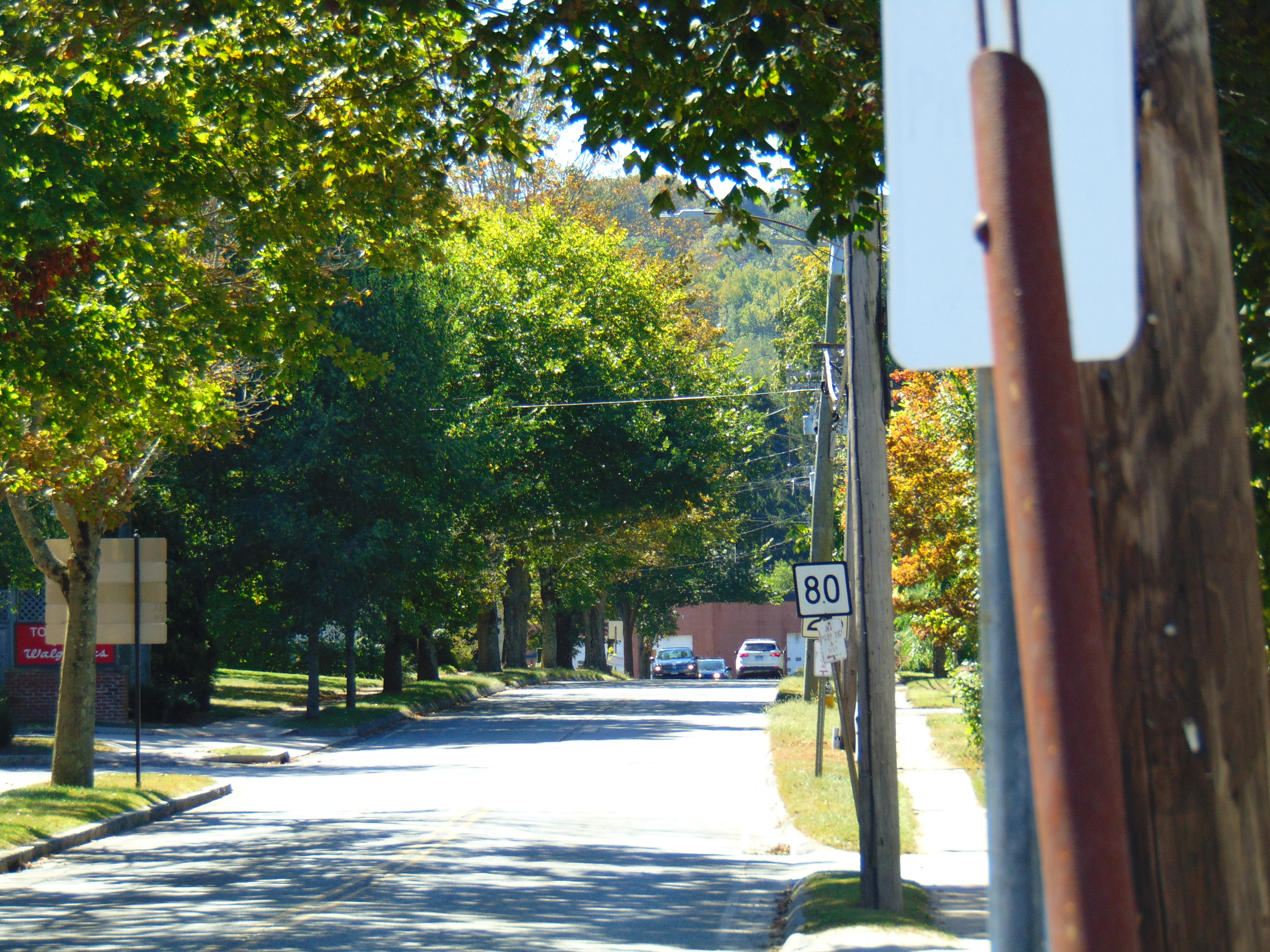
CT 80 shortly after its eastern end in Deep River.

In 1818, a toll road was chartered running from the Boston Post Road at the Guilford-Madison town line northeast through Killingworth center, then east to Deep River, ending at the Middlesex Turnpike. The turnpike, known as the Pettipauge and Guilford Turnpike, used Green Hill Road in Madison and Killingworth then modern Route 80 to Deep River. In 1824, another turnpike was built, beginning in the Fair Haven section of New Haven, heading eastward along modern Route 80, and ending at the Pettipauge and Guilford Turnpike in Killingworth center. This was known as the Fairhaven Turnpike.

In 1922, when Connecticut first publicly signed its state highways with route numbers, several new numbered routes where created from these two turnpikes. From Fair Haven to North Branford center, State Highway 135 was created. Old Highway 135 continued south from North Branford center along modern Route 139 to the Boston Post Road. The eastward continuation of the old Fairhaven Turnpike between North Branford center and the village of North Guilford was designated as State Highway 140. The portion of the old Pettipaue and Guilford Turnpike between Killingworth center and Deep River center became State Highway 175.

Modern Route 80 was established as part of the 1932 state highway renumbering from old highways 175, 140, and the east–west portion of 135. In 1940, its east end was relocated to US 1 in Old Saybrook along Warsaw Street, Main Street, Middlesex Turnpike, and Essex Road. In the 1950s, it was extended west to Route 10 in New Haven along Middletown Avenue, State Street, Edwards Street, Munson Street, and Henry Street to Route 10 (Sherman Avenue). In 1962, the western end was truncated to its current location at Route 17. In 1966, with the opening of Route 9, the eastern end of Route 80 was truncated and rerouted to its current location.

== Junction list ==
County	Location	mi	km	Destinations	Notes
New Haven	New Haven	0.00	0.00	I-91 / Route 17 north – New Haven, Hartford, North Haven	Western terminus; southern terminus of Route 17; exit 2B on I-91
New Haven	New Haven	0.44	0.71	Route 103 north – North Haven	Southern terminus of Route 103
New Haven	East Haven	2.37	3.81	Route 100 south – East Haven	Northern terminus of Route 100
New Haven	North Branford	4.80	7.72	Route 22 west – Northford	Western end of Route 22 concurrency
New Haven	North Branford	6.17	9.93	Route 139 south – Branford	Northern terminus of Route 139
New Haven	North Branford	6.30	10.14	Route 22 east – Guilford	Eastern end of Route 22 concurrency
New Haven	Guilford	9.48	15.26	Route 77 – Durham, Guilford	
New Haven	Madison	14.03	22.58	Route 79 – Durham, Madison	Roundabout
Middlesex	Killingworth	18.19	29.27	Route 81 – Clinton, Higganum	Roundabout
Middlesex	Deep River	21.60	34.76	Route 145 south – Clinton, Westbrook	Western end of Route 145 concurrency
Middlesex	Deep River	21.95	35.33	Route 145 north – Chester	Eastern end of Route 145 concurrency
Middlesex	Deep River	25.28	40.68	Route 9 – Old Saybrook, Middletown	Exit 7 on Route 9
Middlesex	Deep River	25.91	41.70	Route 154 – Haddam, Essex	Eastern terminus
1.000 mi = 1.609 km; 1.000 km = 0.621 mi: Concurrency terminus
