= Connecticut Route 139 =

State highway in New Haven County, Connecticut, US

Route 139
- Map of New Haven County in southern Connecticut with Route 139 highlighted in red

Route information
- Maintained by CTDOT
- Length: 2.36 mi (3.80 km)
- Existed: 1932–present

Major junctions
- South end: US 1 in Branford
- North end: Route 22 / Route 80 in North Branford

Location
- Country: United States
- State: Connecticut
- Counties: New Haven

Highway system
- Connecticut State Highway System; Interstate; US; State; SSR; SR; Scenic
← Route 138	→ Route 140

Route 139 is a state highway in southern Connecticut running from Branford to North Branford.

== Route description ==
Route 139 begins as North Branford Road at an intersection with US 1 in the northern part of Branford. It heads northeast, crossing the Branford River soon entering the town of North Branford. At the town line, the road changes name to Branford Road and continues northward for about 1.5 miles (2.4 km) until its end at an intersection with Routes 22 and 80 in the town center.

== History ==
In the 1920s, a route running east from Fair Haven (in New Haven) via the village of Totoket to the town center of North Branford, then southward to the northeastern corner of Branford, was a state highway designated as Highway 135. In the 1932 state highway renumbering, Route 139 was created from the north–south portion of old Highway 135 between North Branford center and Route 1. The east–west portion of old Highway 135 was assigned to Route 80. In 1935, Route 139 was extended north along Forest Road (now Route 22) to end in the village of Northford at Route 15 (now Route 17). In 1951, the section north of the current northern terminus was transferred to Route 22 when that route was created.

The southern end of Route 139 originally used School Ground Road. In the 1940s, the southern terminus was shifted to use North Branford road instead. The old alignment became Route 139A, which was removed from the state highway system in 1964.

== Junction list ==
The entire route is in New Haven County.

Location	mi	km	Destinations	Notes
Branford	0.00	0.00	US 1 – Guilford, Branford	Southern terminus
North Branford	2.36	3.80	Route 22 / Route 80 – Guilford, North Guilford, New Haven	Northern terminus
1.000 mi = 1.609 km; 1.000 km = 0.621 mi
