= Connecticut Route 77 =

State highway in southern Connecticut, US

Route 77
- Map of southern Connecticut with Route 77 highlighted in red

Route information
- Maintained by CTDOT
- Length: 13.85 mi (22.29 km)
- Existed: 1932–present

Major junctions
- South end: Route 146 in Guilford
- I-95 in Guilford
- North end: Route 17 in Durham

Location
- Country: United States
- State: Connecticut
- Counties: New Haven, Middlesex

Highway system
- Connecticut State Highway System; Interstate; US; State; SSR; SR; Scenic
← Route 75	→ Route 78

Route 77 is a state highway in southern Connecticut. It is a state-designated scenic road and runs from the Guilford town green, through North Guilford, into the town center of Durham.

== Route description ==
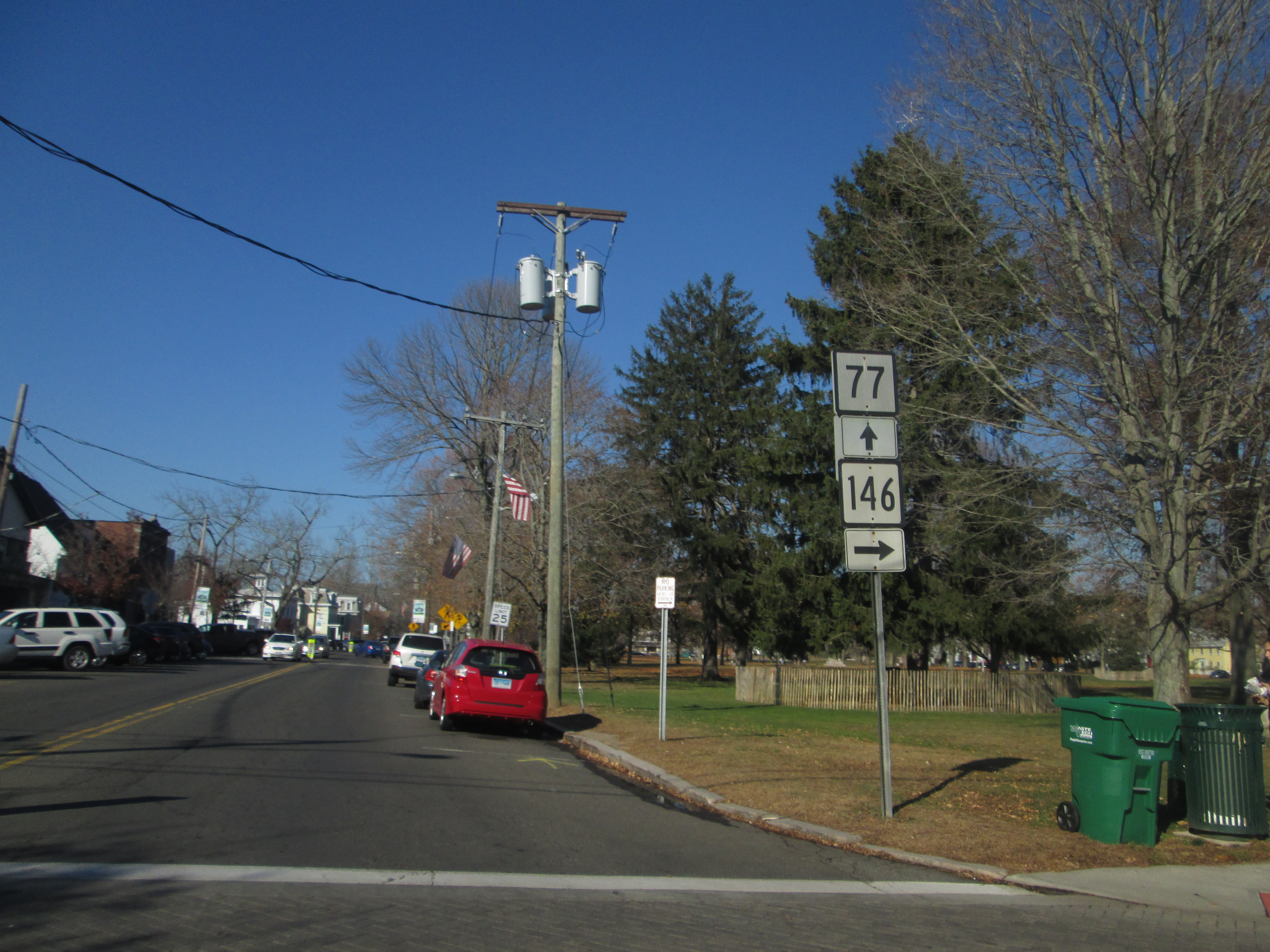
Route 77 on the Guilford town green

Route 77 begins at an intersection with Route 146 at the Guilford town green as Whitfield Street. It runs around the west side of the green, then shifts to Church Street as it leaves the green. Route 77 crosses US 1 and I-95 (at exit 58), becoming the main road through the northern part of Guilford, past Lake Quonnipaug. Between I-95 and the Durham town line, Route 77 is known as Durham Road. It has a junction with Route 80 (leading to Killingworth and North Branford) about 5.4 miles (8.7 km) north of I-95, then crosses into the town of Durham, where the road changes name to Guilford Road. Route 77 runs for another 2.3 miles (3.7 km) in Durham and ends at an intersection with Route 17 just south of the town center, near the northern end of Route 79. The entire route is classified as a collector road and carries average daily traffic volumes of about 5,900 vehicles.

Route 77 is a designated state scenic road for its entire length.

== History ==
The road from Guilford center to Durham center was chartered as a private turnpike in 1824, known as the Guilford and Durham Turnpike. In 1922, Connecticut took over the maintenance of the main through routes and State Highway 112 was established, incorporating the old turnpike alignment from Guilford to Durham and extending north beyond Durham into Middletown (along modern Route 17). In the 1932 state highway renumbering, Route 77 was created from the portion of old Highway 112 south of Durham center. The portion north of Durham center became part of Route 15 (now Route 17). The original Route 77 ended at US 1. It was extended south to Route 146 in 1962.

== Junction list ==
County	Location	mi	km	Destinations	Notes
New Haven	Guilford	0.00	0.00	Route 146 – Madison, Branford	Southern terminus
New Haven	Guilford	0.50	0.80	US 1 – Madison, Branford	
New Haven	Guilford	1.04	1.67	I-95 – New London, New Haven	Exit 60 on I-95
New Haven	Guilford	5.46	8.79	Route 80 – North Branford, Killingworth	
Middlesex	Durham	13.85	22.29	Route 17 – Northford, Middletown	Northern terminus
1.000 mi = 1.609 km; 1.000 km = 0.621 mi
