= Connecticut Route 103 =

State highway in New Haven County, Connecticut, US

Route 103
- Map of New Haven County in southern Connecticut with Route 103 highlighted in red

Route information
- Maintained by CTDOT
- Length: 5.31 mi (8.55 km)
- Existed: 1987–present

Major junctions
- South end: Route 80 in New Haven
- North end: US 5 / Route 22 in North Haven

Location
- Country: United States
- State: Connecticut
- Counties: New Haven

Highway system
- Connecticut State Highway System; Interstate; US; State; SSR; SR; Scenic
← Route 102	→ Route 104

Route 103 is a state highway in Connecticut running from the Quinnipiac Meadows neighborhood in New Haven, through the Montowese area of North Haven, ending at the town center of North Haven.

== Route description ==
Route 103 begins as a continuation of Quinnipiac Avenue at an intersection with Route 80 in the Quinnipiac Meadows at the Roundabout neighborhood of New Haven. It crosses into the Montowese section of North Haven after about 1.1 miles (1.8 km), and meets with Route 17 (Middletown Avenue) after another 0.4 miles (0.64 km). Route 103 continues north for another 0.8 miles (1.3 km), then intersects with Montowese Avenue, which is an unsigned state highway (SSR 715) signed for I-91 (at exit 9), and also leads to the Universal Drive shopping area. Route 103 continues north, crossing the Muddy River (a tributary of the Quinnipiac River), at which point the road becomes known as Maple Avenue. Maple Avenue runs through some residential areas of North Haven towards the town center. At the town center, Route 103 meets with Broadway (State Road 729), a former alignment of Route 22 and U.S. Route 5. North of Broadway, the road is now known as Washington Avenue, which ends at the junction of Route 5 and 22 after another 280 yards (260 m). Route 103 runs parallel to I-91 between exits 8 and 11.

The section from Sackett Point Road in North Haven to the northern terminus at Route 5 and 22 is also known as the American Legion, Murray-Reynolds Post #76 Memorial Highway.

== History ==
The portion of Route 103 north of Route 17 was originally one of the main routes between New Haven and Hartford. It became a numbered state highway in 1922 when it was designated as part of New England Route 2. In 1926, the U.S. Highway System was established and U.S. Route 5 was co-signed with Route 2. In the 1932 state highway renumbering, the Route 2 designation was removed and became just US 5. By the late 1930s, a parallel alignment west of the Quinnipiac River, along State Street, was designated as U.S. Route 5A. The two routes were swapped by the 1950s and Route 103 became part of US 5A instead.

The portion south of Route 17 was first designated as a state road in 1962 known as SR 560. It was renumbered to SR 750 in 1964. The US 5A designation was removed in this area in 1966 and SR 750 was extended northward to Broadway in North Haven. When Routes 5 and 22 were relocated to the new connector in 1973, SR 750 was extended further north to the new 5/22 junction. Modern Route 103 was created in 1987 from SR 750 and remains unchanged since then.

== Junction list ==
The entire route is in New Haven County.

Location	mi	km	Destinations	Notes
New Haven	0.00	0.00	Route 80 – New Haven, North Branford	Southern terminus
North Haven	1.47	2.37	Route 17 – New Haven, Northford	
North Haven	2.25	3.62	Montowese Avenue (SR 715)	
North Haven	5.31	8.55	US 5 / Route 22 – Wallingford, New Haven, Hamden, Northford	Northern terminus
1.000 mi = 1.609 km; 1.000 km = 0.621 mi
