= Connecticut Route 22 =

State highway in New Haven County, Connecticut, US

Route 22
- Map of New Haven County in Southern Connecticut with Route 22 highlighted in red

Route information
- Maintained by CTDOT
- Length: 14.07 mi (22.64 km)
- Existed: 1951–present

Major junctions
- West end: Route 10 / Route 40 in Hamden
- Route 15 in North Haven; I-91 in North Haven
- South end: US 1 in Guilford

Location
- Country: United States
- State: Connecticut
- Counties: New Haven

Highway system
- Connecticut State Highway System; Interstate; US; State; SSR; SR; Scenic
← Route 21	→ Route 25

Route 22 is a 14.07-mile-long (22.64 km) secondary state route within the U.S. state of Connecticut. Route 22 is an L-shaped road that is signed east–west from Hamden to the western junction of Route 80 in North Branford, and north–south to its eastern terminus in Guilford. It was designated in 1951 as a bypass of New Haven, connecting Route 15 (Wilbur Cross Parkway) and Route 80.

== Route description ==
Route 22 is mostly a two-lane minor arterial road, except in sections where it overlaps other state highways. It starts at Route 10 in the Mount Carmel section of Hamden heading east as Ives Street. Route 22 then turns south on Broadway 0.2 miles (0.32 km) later, becoming Davis Road as it enters the town of North Haven. It turns left on Ridge Road then continues east as Bishop Street towards North Haven center. It intersects Route 15 (Wilbur Cross Parkway) then meets with Route 5. The Route 5 and Route 22 overlap (0.7 miles long) crosses over the Quinnipiac River and I-91 (with a partial interchange) along the Route 5/22 Connector. At the next intersection, Route 5 heads north, Route 103 begins south, and Route 22 continues east towards the Clintonville section of North Haven as Clintonville Road.

Route 22 then enters the town of North Branford, passing the southern end of Route 150 before entering the village of Northford. It briefly overlaps Route 17 (Middletown Avenue) as it shifts cardinal direction, heading southward along Forest Road. After about 4.4 miles (7.1 km), Route 22 meets with Route 80, at which point Route 22 officially changes from a signed east-west to a signed north-south route. After overlapping with Route 80 for 1.5 miles (2.4 km) (including a junction with the northern end of Route 139), Route 22 then separates and continues southeastward on Notch Hill Road towards the town of Guilford. The road name changes to Norton Hill Road at the Guilford town line, and quickly ends after 160 feet (49 m) at Route 1.

The Route 5/22 Connector in North Haven is also known as Officer Timothy W. Laffin Memorial Highway. Officer Laffin is the only North Haven police officer to have died in the line of duty, having succumbed to his injuries following a patrol car pursuit accident in May 1980.

== History ==
Route 22 was established in 1951 as a bypass of New Haven, connecting the newly opened Route 15 (Wilbur Cross Parkway) with Route 80. Prior to that the portion of modern Route 22 between Route 5 and Route 17 was former Route 168; the portion between Route 17 and Route 80 originally belonged to Route 139; and the portion between Route 80 and Route 1 was the former Route 141.

In 1973, a section in North Haven between State Street and Washington Avenue was rerouted from its original alignment along Broadway to the new Route 5/22 Connector, including a partial interchange with I-91 (at exit 11).

== Junction list ==
The entire route is in New Haven County.

Location	mi	km	Destinations	Notes
Hamden	0.00	0.00	Route 10 / Route 40 south – New Haven, Hamden Center, Cheshire, Southington	Western terminus; northern terminus of Route 40
North Haven	1.83	2.95	Route 15 (Wilbur Cross Parkway) – New Haven, Hartford	Exit 53 on Wilbur Cross Parkway
North Haven	2.02	3.25	US 5 south – New Haven	Western end of US 5 concurrency
North Haven	2.41	3.88	To I-91 south – New Haven	Exit 7 on I-91 north
North Haven	2.68	4.31	US 5 north / Route 103 south – Wallingford, Montowese	Eastern end of US 5 concurrency; northern terminus of Route 103
North Branford	6.15	9.90	Route 150 north – Wallingford	Southern terminus of Route 150
North Branford	6.46– 6.52	10.40– 10.49	Route 17 – Durham, New Haven	
North Branford	10.88	17.51	Route 80 west – New Haven	Northern end of Route 80 concurrency
North Branford	12.25	19.71	Route 139 south – Branford	Northern terminus of Route 139
North Branford	12.38	19.92	Route 80 east – Killingworth	Southern end of Route 80 concurrency
Guilford	14.07	22.64	US 1 – Madison, Branford	Southern terminus
1.000 mi = 1.609 km; 1.000 km = 0.621 mi: Concurrency terminus

== Truck route ==
- Location: New Haven County, Connecticut
- Existed: 1972–present

Truck Route 22 is the only bannered route in the entire state. In 1972, trucks were prohibited from traveling the portion of Route 22 between Whitney Avenue (Route 10) in Hamden and State Street (Route 5) in North Haven. Trucks following Route 22 westbound are currently directed to follow State Street south (US 5) until Dixwell Avenue (SR 717) then west until Whitney Avenue (Route 10) and north up to the Route 22 junction.
