= Hammonasset =

Hammonasset may refer to the following in the U.S. state of Connecticut:

- Hammonasset, a historic area that is now the towns of Clinton and Killingworth
- Hammonasset Beach State Park, in the town of Madison, New Haven County
- Hammonasset Connector, a state highway
- Hammonasset River, a tributary of Long Island Sound
- Hammonasset School, in the town of Madison, New Haven County
