= Hammonasset Connector =

Highway in Connecticut

- Map of New Haven County in southern Connecticut with Hammonasset Connector highlighted in red

Route information
- Length: 1.35 mi (2.17 km)
- Existed: 1957–present

Major junctions
- South end: US 1 in Madison
- North end: I-95 / SSR 450 in Madison

Location
- Country: United States
- State: Connecticut
- Counties: New Haven

Highway system
- Connecticut State Highway System; Interstate; US; State; SSR; SR; Scenic

The Hammonasset Connector is a 1.35-mile-long (2.17 km) freeway from Interstate 95 (I-95) to U.S. Route 1 (US 1). The Hammonasset Connector begins as a continuation of Duck Hole Road at exit 62 on I-95 in the town of Madison. The connector is designated as part of Special Service Road 450 (SSR 450), a designation which continues along Duck Hole Road and Horse Pond Road to Route 79. The road gets its name from Hammonasset State Park, the park at the southern terminus of the freeway.

== Route description ==
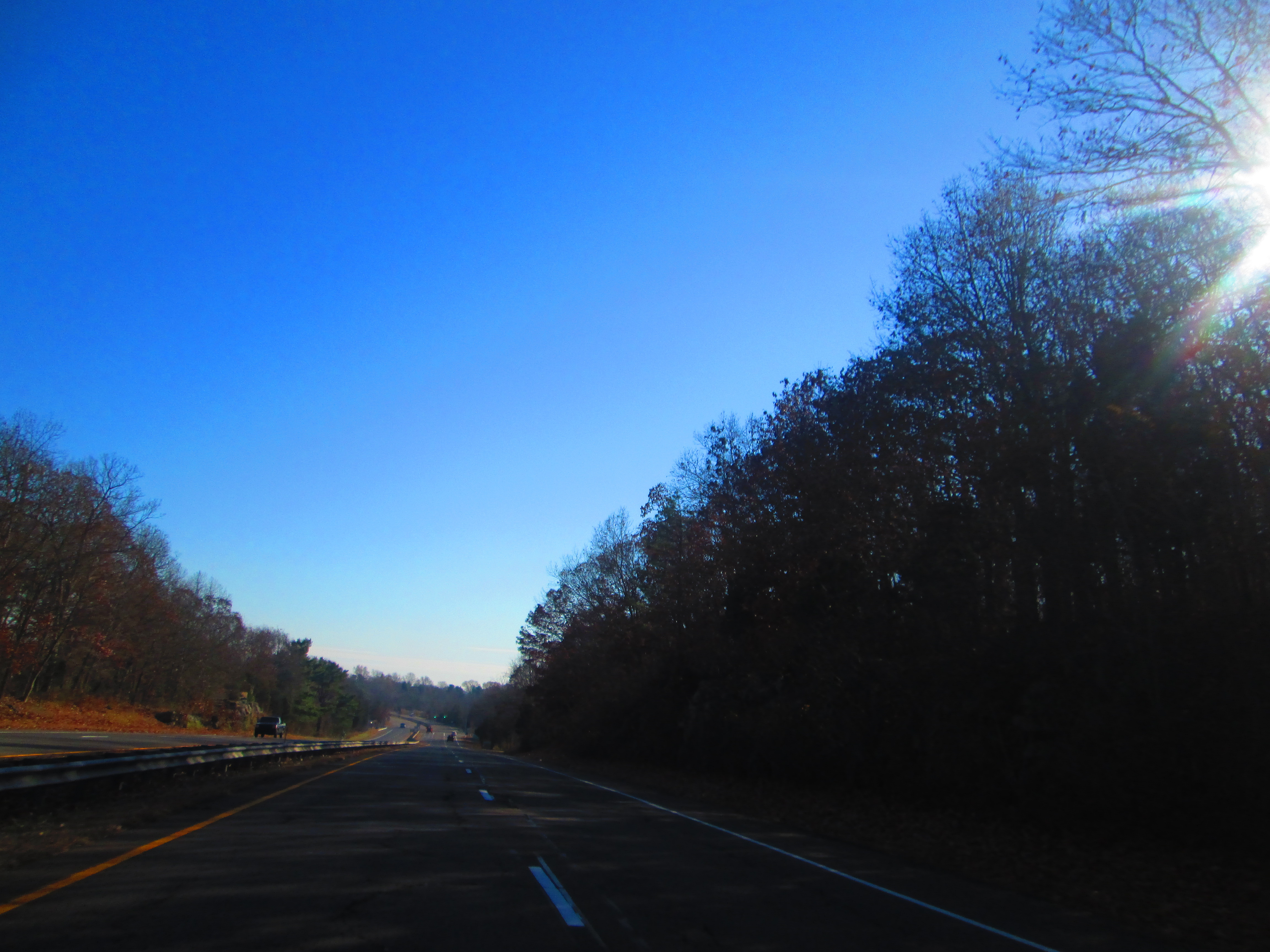
The Hammonasset Connector midway between I-95 and US 1

The connector starts as a continuation of Duck Hole Road at an interchange with I-95 in Madison. The road crosses over I-95 about 190 yards (170 m) from when it begins. The connector parallels the Hammonasset River for its entire length. The connector terminates at an intersection with U.S. Route 1 in Madison, and the road continues into Hammonasset State Park beyond US 1 as a local road.

== History ==
The Hammonasset Connector was built in 1957, serving as a freeway from I-95 to the park in Madison. The Connecticut Department of Transportation (CDOT) had once planned to turn the southern terminus of the connector into an interchange, where ramps would be given for US 1 and the connector's internal designation, 450, would continue in the park. In fact, the designation did stretch into the park until 1984, when it was truncated to US 1. There had also been a plan to build a Route 79 expressway over the connector, but this did not occur.

== Major intersections ==
The entire route is in Madison, New Haven County.

mi	km	Destinations	Notes
0.00	0.00	US 1 – Clinton, Guilford	Southern terminus
1.24	2.00	I-95 – New London, New Haven	Exit 66 on I-95
1.35	2.17	Duck Hill Road (SSR 450 north)	Continuation north
1.000 mi = 1.609 km; 1.000 km = 0.621 mi
