= Connecticut Route 17 =

North-south state highway in Connecticut, US

Route 17

Route information
- Maintained by CTDOT
- Length: 36.33 mi (58.47 km)
- Existed: 1948–present

Major junctions
- South end: I-91 / Route 80 / Middletown Avenue in New Haven
- Route 66 in Portland; Route 9 in Middletown
- North end: Route 2 in Glastonbury

Location
- Country: United States
- State: Connecticut
- Counties: New Haven, Middlesex, Hartford

Highway system
- Connecticut State Highway System; Interstate; US; State; SSR; SR; Scenic
← Route 16	→ Route 19

Route 17 is a primary north–south state route beginning in New Haven, through Middletown, and ending in Glastonbury, with a length of 36.33 miles (58.47 km).

== Route description ==
Route 17 officially begins about 0.1 miles (0.16 km) west of its interchange with Interstate 91 (at Exit 8). Route 80 begins at the interchange and continues eastward while Route 17 turns northward. Route 17 is a four-lane surface road, becoming 2 lanes as it passes through North Haven, Northford (where it briefly overlaps with Route 22), and Durham. In Middletown it becomes a four-lane freeway for 0.6 miles (0.97 km) leading to an interchange with the Route 9 freeway. Route 17 duplexes with Route 9 for about 0.8 miles (1.3 km) on a four-lane expressway from Exit 13 to Exit 16, where Route 17 exits and shortly thereafter begins a 3.0 miles (4.8 km) concurrency with Route 66 as it crosses the Connecticut River from Middletown into Portland on the Arrigoni Bridge. Just after the bridge, it spawns a 3.02-mile-long (4.86 km) alternate, Route 17A, which leads to the center of town. Routes 17 and 66 become a four-lane surface road for the rest of the concurrency, where Route 17 turns north and becomes a two-lane surface road. After meeting the northern end of Route 17A, it enters Glastonbury, passing through the South Glastonbury Historic District and gradually becoming more suburban. Route 17 briefly becomes a two-lane freeway, before becoming a four-lane freeway for the last 1.4 miles (2.3 km), which ultimately merges into Route 2 West at Exit 7.

The southern surface section from New Haven to Middletown is also known as George Washington Memorial Highway. The 0.6-mile (0.97 km) freeway section from South Main Street to Route 9 in Middletown is known as the Catholic War Veterans Memorial Highway. A 1.4-mile (2.3 km) section in Durham, from the junction with Route 77 to just north of the junction with Route 68, is a designated state scenic road.

== History ==
The road between New Haven and Middletown via Durham was one of the routes used by the Boston Post Road in colonial times. In 1813, the road became a private turnpike known as the Middletown, Durham and New Haven Turnpike. The turnpike corporation was dissolved in the late 19th century. By 1922, Connecticut had numbered roads that were maintained by the state, which included all of modern Route 17. The roads were designated as Highway 114 from New Haven to Durham; part of Highway 112 from Durham to Middletown; and Highway 104 from Middletown to Glastonbury.

In the 1932 state highway renumbering, the road from New Haven to Glastonbury became part of the newly established Route 15. At that time, Route 15 used all of modern Route 17, then continued north along Main Street in East Hartford, then northeast via modern Route 30, Route 190, and Route 171 to the Massachusetts state line. In 1948, the Route 15 designation was reassigned to the Merritt Parkway, Wilbur Cross Parkway, Berlin Turnpike, and Wilbur Cross Highway. The old Route 15 south of Glastonbury was renumbered to Route 17.

== Junction list ==
Exit numbers were originally unnumbered, but they received mile-based exit numbers in 2023 as part of a sign replacement project.

County	Location	mi	km	Old exit	New exit	Destinations	Notes
New Haven	New Haven	0.00	0.00			Middletown Avenue	Continuation south
New Haven	New Haven	0.14– 0.21	0.23– 0.34			I-91 / Route 80 east – New Haven, Hartford, Foxon	Western terminus of Route 80; exit 2B on I-91
New Haven	North Haven	1.70	2.74			Route 103 – North Haven, East Haven	
New Haven	Northford	6.98– 7.04	11.23– 11.33			Route 22 – North Haven, North Branford	
Middlesex	Durham	14.98	24.11			Route 77 south – North Guilford, Guilford	Northern terminus of Route 77
Middlesex	Durham	15.14	24.37			Route 79 south – Madison	Northern terminus of Route 79
Middlesex	Durham	16.00	25.75			Route 68 west – Wallingford	Eastern terminus of Route 68
Middlesex	Durham	16.58	26.68			Route 147 north – Middlefield, Meriden	Southern terminus of Route 147
Middlesex	Middletown	19.95	32.11			Route 155 east – Middletown, Higganum	Western terminus of Route 155
Middlesex	Middletown			Southern end of limited-access section			
Middlesex	Middletown			—	21A	Main Street Extension	Signed as exit 21 southbound
Middlesex	Middletown	21.97	35.36	13	21B (NB); 23A (SB)	Route 9 south – Old Saybrook	No southbound entrance; southern end of Route 9 concurrency
Middlesex	Middletown	22.33	35.94	14	23B	deKoven Drive – Harbor Area	Southbound exit and northbound entrance
Middlesex	Middletown	22.57	36.32	15	23C	Route 66 west – Middletown	At-grade intersection; access via SR 545; signed as exit 23 northbound
Middlesex	Middletown	22.97	36.97	16	24	Route 9 north – New Britain	At-grade intersection; northern end of Route 9 concurrency
Middlesex	Middletown	22.97	36.97	Northern end of limited-access section			
Middlesex	Middletown	23.14	37.24			Route 66 west – Middletown	Southern end of Route 66 concurrency
Middlesex	Connecticut River	23.70	38.14	Arrigoni Bridge			
Middlesex	Portland	24.17	38.90			Route 17A north (Main Street)	Southern terminus of Route 17A
Middlesex	Portland	26.12	42.04			Route 66 east – Cobalt, Colchester, Willimantic	Northern end of Route 66 concurrency
Middlesex	Portland	28.15	45.30			Route 17A south (Main Street)	Northern terminus of Route 17A
Hartford	Glastonbury	32.63	52.51			Route 160 west – Rocky Hill	Eastern terminus of Route 160; via Rocky Hill–Glastonbury ferry (April 1–November 30)
Hartford	Glastonbury			Southern end of freeway section			
Hartford	Glastonbury			—	34	Hubbard Street	Southbound exit and northbound entrance
Hartford	Glastonbury			—	35	New London Turnpike – Glastonbury Center, East Glastonbury	Signed as exits 35 (west) & 36 (east) southbound
Hartford	Glastonbury	36.41	58.60	—	—	Route 2 west – Hartford	Northern terminus; exit 5 on Route 2
1.000 mi = 1.609 km; 1.000 km = 0.621 mi: Concurrency terminus; Incomplete access

== Route 17A ==
Route 17A
- Location: Portland
- Length: 3.02 mi (4.86 km)

Route 17A is an alternate route running for 3.02 miles (4.86 km) from Route 17 and 66, through Portland center, and back to Route 17. It serves as the Main Street of the town. The original Route 17 (then Route 15) used the 17A alignment. The main route bypassed the town center by 1940 and Main Street became Route 15A. When Route 15 was relocated and the route through Portland became Route 17, Route 15A was also renumbered to 17A.
