= Genesee Tunnel =

- Interactive map of Genesee Tunnel

Overview
- Location: Madison, Connecticut
- Coordinates: 41.3749°N 72.6187°W
- Start: Lake Hammonasset
- End: Totoket Reservoir

Operation
- Operator: South Central Connecticut Regional Water Authority

The Genesee Tunnel is an underground water pipeline operated by the South Central Connecticut Regional Water Authority (formerly the New Haven Water Company), part of the Authority's source water distribution system.

The tunnel runs partly across a section of RWA land known as the Genesee Recreation area, located northwest of the intersection of Route 79 and Route 80, which is covered by 9 miles of hiking trails and is the site of the historic "Little Genesee Settlement." The Genesee Recreation area is accessible for hiking and fishing to anyone with an RWA Recreation Permit.
