= Fourth District School =

- U.S. National Register of Historic Places
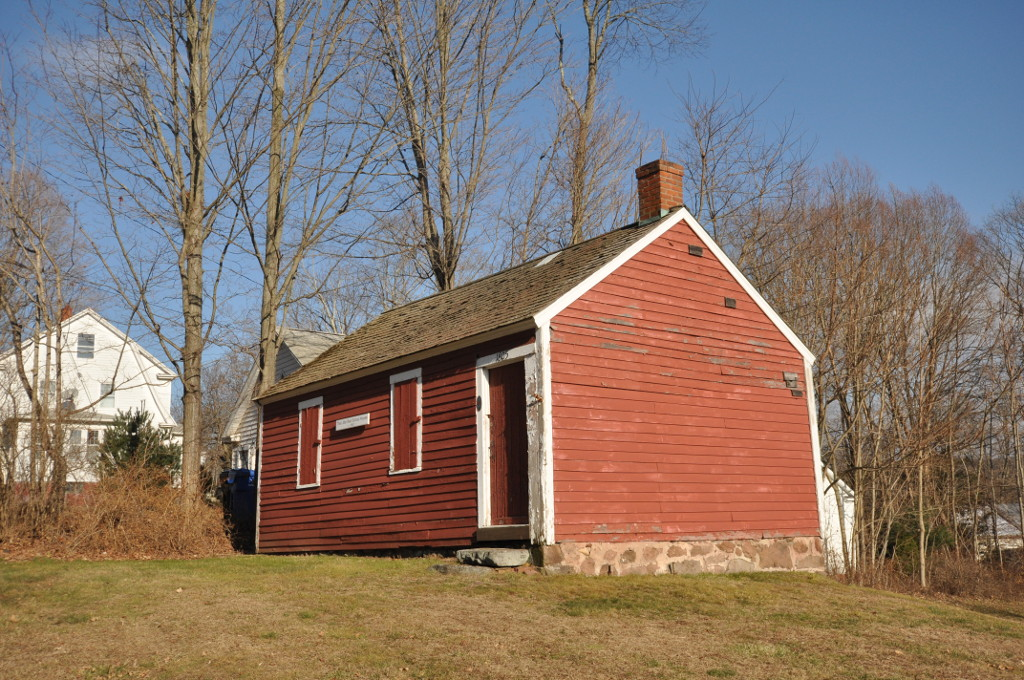

- Location within Connecticut Location within the United States
- Location: Old Post Road, North Branford, Connecticut
- Coordinates: 41°23′41″N 72°47′28″W
- Area: less than one acre
- Built: 1800
- NRHP reference No.: 85001917
- Added to NRHP: August 29, 1985

The Fourth District School is a historic district school building on Old Post Road in North Branford, Connecticut. Built about 1800, it is a rare surviving example of a late 18th-century schoolhouse in Connecticut. It was moved to its present location from a more rural setting in 1928. It was listed on the National Register of Historic Places in 1985. It is now owned and maintained by the Totoket Historical Society as a museum property.

== Description and history ==
The Fourth District School is located on the north side of the village of Northford, on the east side of Old Post Road just north of the Edward Smith Library. It is a single-story wood frame structure, with a gabled roof and clapboarded exterior. Its long side is set parallel to the street, with two windows and a single door. Some of its exterior features, including the clapboards and plank door, are original, while others are the result of a sensitive restoration in 1965. The interior, including plaster-on-lath walls with wooden wainscoting, also date to the restoration as a recreation of the original features. When used as a school, it was probably originally fitted with benches facing a high teacher's desk.

North Branford's fourth district was established in 1769, and classes were typically held in the meeting house during the winter months. The present building was built about 1800, and was originally located on Forest Road, in a rural setting about 1 mile (1.6 km) north of its present location. It was moved in 1928 to prevent its demolition, and underwent a major restoration in 1965.

== See also ==
- National Register of Historic Places listings in New Haven County, Connecticut
