= Twin Lakes (North Branford, Connecticut) =

Suburban neighborhood in Connecticut

Twin Lakes is a suburban neighborhood along the south side of North Branford, Connecticut, United States. The population was 2,476 at the 2010 census. It is the town's most densely populated neighborhood with a population of 884/sq. mile at the 2010 census.

== Description ==
Twin Lakes Road runs across the west side of the neighborhood, Foxon Road across the north side of the neighborhood, and Branford Road along the south side of the neighborhood. It has many private properties along two identical lakes called Cedar Lake and Linsley Lake- each along one side of Twin Lakes Road. It is also home to Twin Lakes Golf Course, one of the largest and most well known in the state. Twin Lakes is considered to be one of the most safe and popular neighborhoods in North Branford, in New Haven County, Connecticut.

The neighborhood is very hilly, with Saltonstall Mountain to the south. The elevation is an estimated 340 feet (100 m), the highest of any North Branford neighborhood. However, the highest point in the town is Totoket Mountain in Northford, which rises to 720 feet (220 m).
