= Bridge No. 1132 =

- U.S. National Register of Historic Places
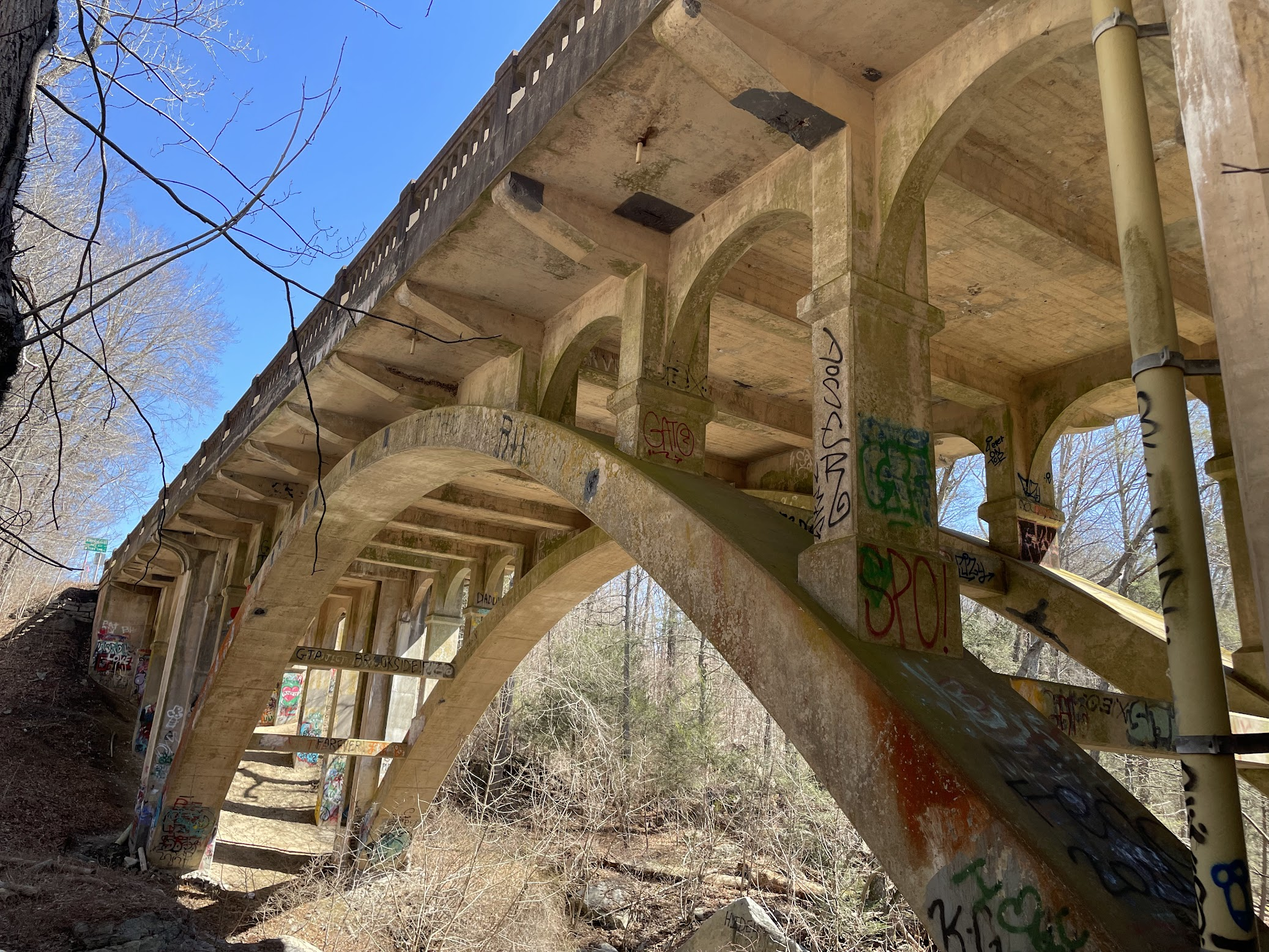

- Location within Connecticut Location within the United States
- Location: CT 80 at Hammonasset River, Madison, Connecticut
- Coordinates: 41°21′26″N 72°36′45.19″W
- Area: less than 1 acre (0.40 ha)
- Built: 1934
- Architect: Osborn-Barnes Construction Co.
- Architectural style: open-spandrel concrete arch
- NRHP reference No.: 04001091
- Added to NRHP: September 29, 2004

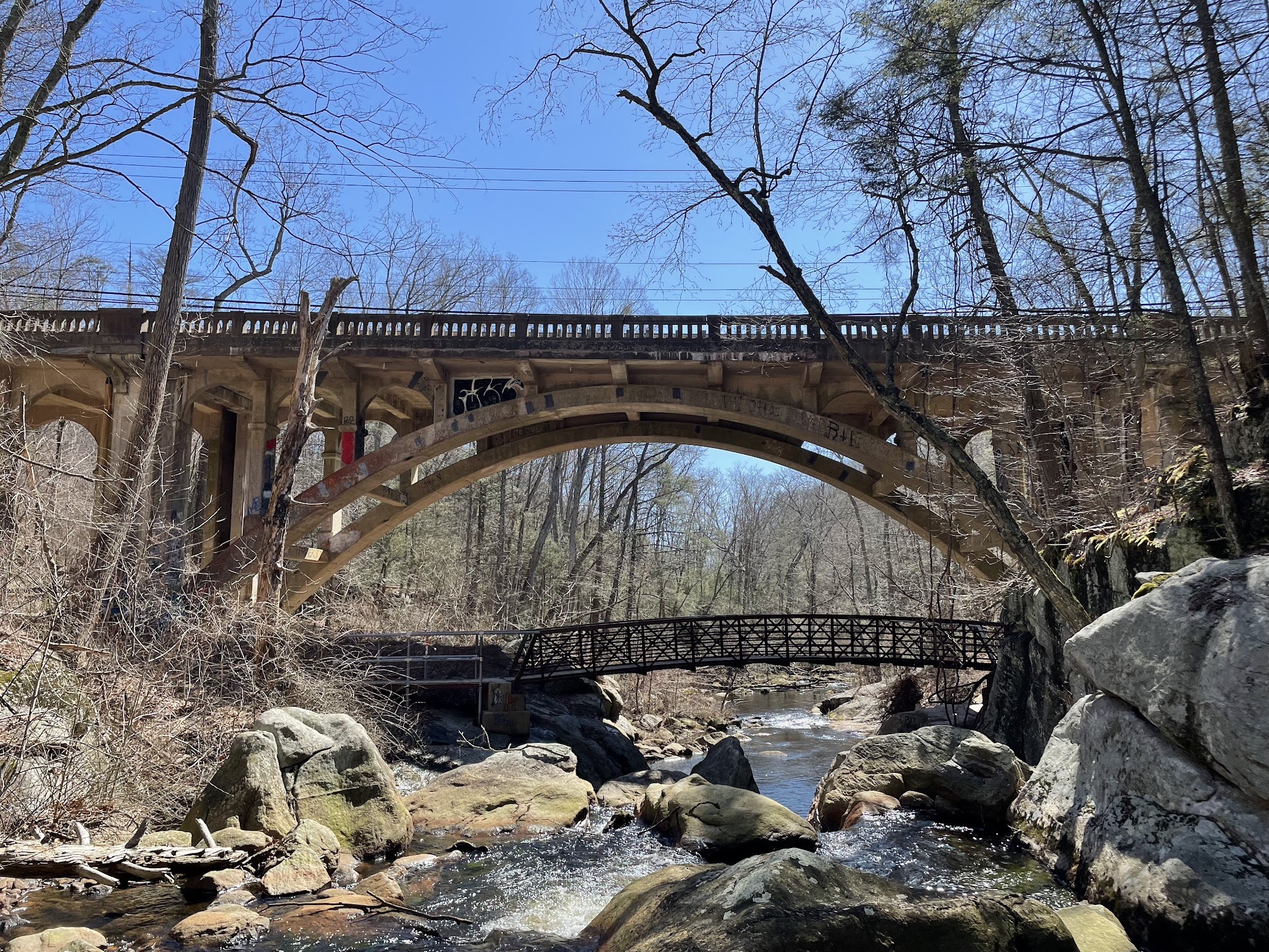
The bridge viewed from the north with a footbridge visible below

Bridge No. 1132 is an open-spandrel concrete arch bridge carrying the two-lane Connecticut Route 80 across the Hammonasset River, between Killingworth and Madison, Connecticut. Built in 1934, it is one of a small number of open-spandrel concrete bridges in the state, and was noted for its aesthetics at the time of its construction. It was listed on the National Register of Historic Places in 2004.

The bridge can be viewed from below from the Bailey Trail North; a hiking trail maintained by the Madison Land Trust.

== Description and history ==
Bridge No. 1132 is located in western Killingworth and eastern Madison, spanning the Hammonasset River south of Lake Hammonasset. The bridge spans a steep wooded ravine, with its main arch spanning 100 feet (30 m). There are three concrete girder spans on each side of the main arch, giving the structure an overall length of 231 feet (70 m). The road deck is 30 feet (9.1 m) wide, but the arches supporting it are only 20 feet (6.1 m) apart, with concrete ribs projecting to the sides of the arches for additional support. There are eight supporting concrete beams rising in each spandrel area of the arches.

The bridge was designed by the Connecticut Highway Department and built by the Osborn-Barnes Construction Company of Danbury, Connecticut, in 1934. It was highlighted by the Highway Department for its scenic location. The state typically only built open-spandrel bridges for particularly long spans, or sites such as this one with steep sides. This bridge replaced an older one that had been located further down the ravine; its construction thus eliminated steep approaches on what is a major east–west roadway.

== See also ==
- National Register of Historic Places listings in Middlesex County, Connecticut
- National Register of Historic Places listings in New Haven County, Connecticut
- List of bridges documented by the Historic American Engineering Record in Connecticut
- List of bridges on the National Register of Historic Places in Connecticut
