= Lake Gaillard =

Reservoir in North Branford, Connecticut, United States

- Location within Connecticut Location within the United States
- Location: North Branford, Connecticut
- Coordinates: 41.350°N 72.775°W

Lake Gaillard is a man-made lake in North Branford, Connecticut that serves as a reservoir for the South Central Connecticut Regional Water Authority (RWA).

The New Haven Water Company (now RWA) started buying land in North Branford during the 1920s from the area of Totoket Mountain to what is now known as Sea Hill Road, with the intention of building a reservoir. Lake Gaillard took over 7 years to build, from 1926 to 1933. The lake covered 22 existing homes and farms.

The lake is over 1.5 miles long by over a mile wide at its largest points and makes up over 20% of the area of North Branford. The RWA owns 34.9% (6,000 out of 17,000 sq acres) of the land in North Branford, primarily surrounding Lake Gaillard. This area is private and not open to the public. Lake Gaillard is the largest reservoir in RWA's system.

The reservoir provides water for more than 500,000 RWA customers in New Haven County including North Branford, Branford, East Haven, North Haven and part of New Haven. The water stored in the reservoir is sent for processing at a designated water treatment plant for subsequent distribution.
