= Northford Center Historic District =

Historic district in Connecticut, United States

- Northford Center
- U.S. National Register of Historic Places
- U.S. Historic district
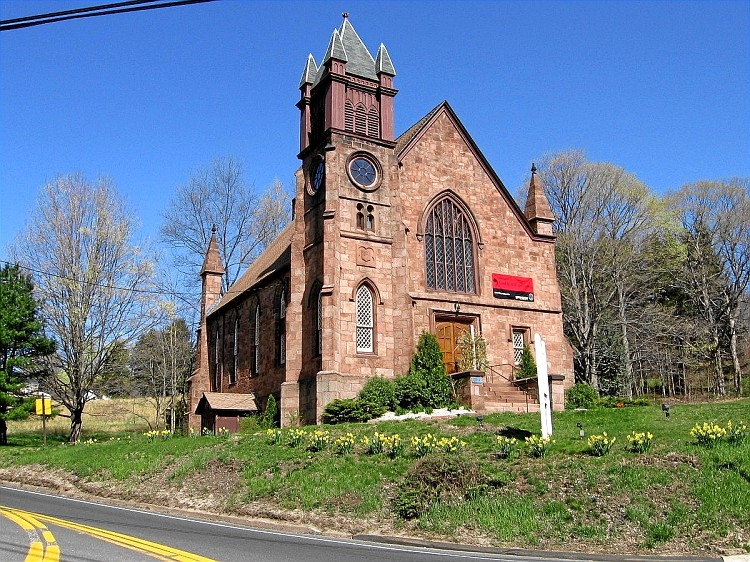
- Northford Congregational Church

- Location within Connecticut Location within the United States
- Location: Roughly along Middletown Avenue and parts of Old Post Road, North Branford, Connecticut
- Coordinates: 41°24′0″N 72°46′59″W
- Area: 230 acres (93 ha)
- Architect: Henry Austin; Boylan, Alfred W.
- Architectural style: Colonial, Early Republic
- NRHP reference No.: 02001629
- Added to NRHP: December 31, 2002

The Northford Center Historic District encompasses the historic village area of Northford in northern North Branford, Connecticut. The basically linear district extends along Middletown Avenue CT 17 from the village center at its Southern End, to a point beyond its Northern Junction with Old Post Road. The area was settled in the early 18th century, and was transformed into a rural industrial village in the 19th century by the locally prominent Maltby and Fowler families. The district includes many fine pre-Civil-War houses (including the Howd-Linsley House), two churches (including the gothic-revival Northford Congregational Church designed by Henry Austin), and a schoolhouse (the Fourth District School). It was listed on the National Register of Historic Places in 2002.

== Description and history ==
Northford was originally part of the New Haven Colony in the 17th century, and was settled in the early 18th century as part of Branford. It became part of North Branford when that town was incorporated in 1831. It was at first a rural outpost of Branford, which was granted a separate Congregational parish in 1745. The village center of Northford, now at the Southern Junction of Middletown Avenue CT 17 and Old Post Road, grew around the colonial meeting house that was erected soon afterward. It served primarily the local farming community, and also travelers along the post road; one of the oldest surviving buildings in the district is a tavern built in 1776.

The village was transformed in the 19th century into a small industrial center, whose major early industry was the manufacture of pins, screws, and other fasteners. These industrial efforts were largely run by members of the interrelated Maltby and Fowler families. As a result, the district is architecturally diverse, with buildings dating from the 18th to the early 20th century. Most of the buildings were built before the American Civil War, although there are a few residences, including several fine ones, built later by the industrial leaders.

== See also ==
- National Register of Historic Places listings in New Haven County, Connecticut
