= Lake Chamberlain (Connecticut) =

Lake in Connecticut, USA

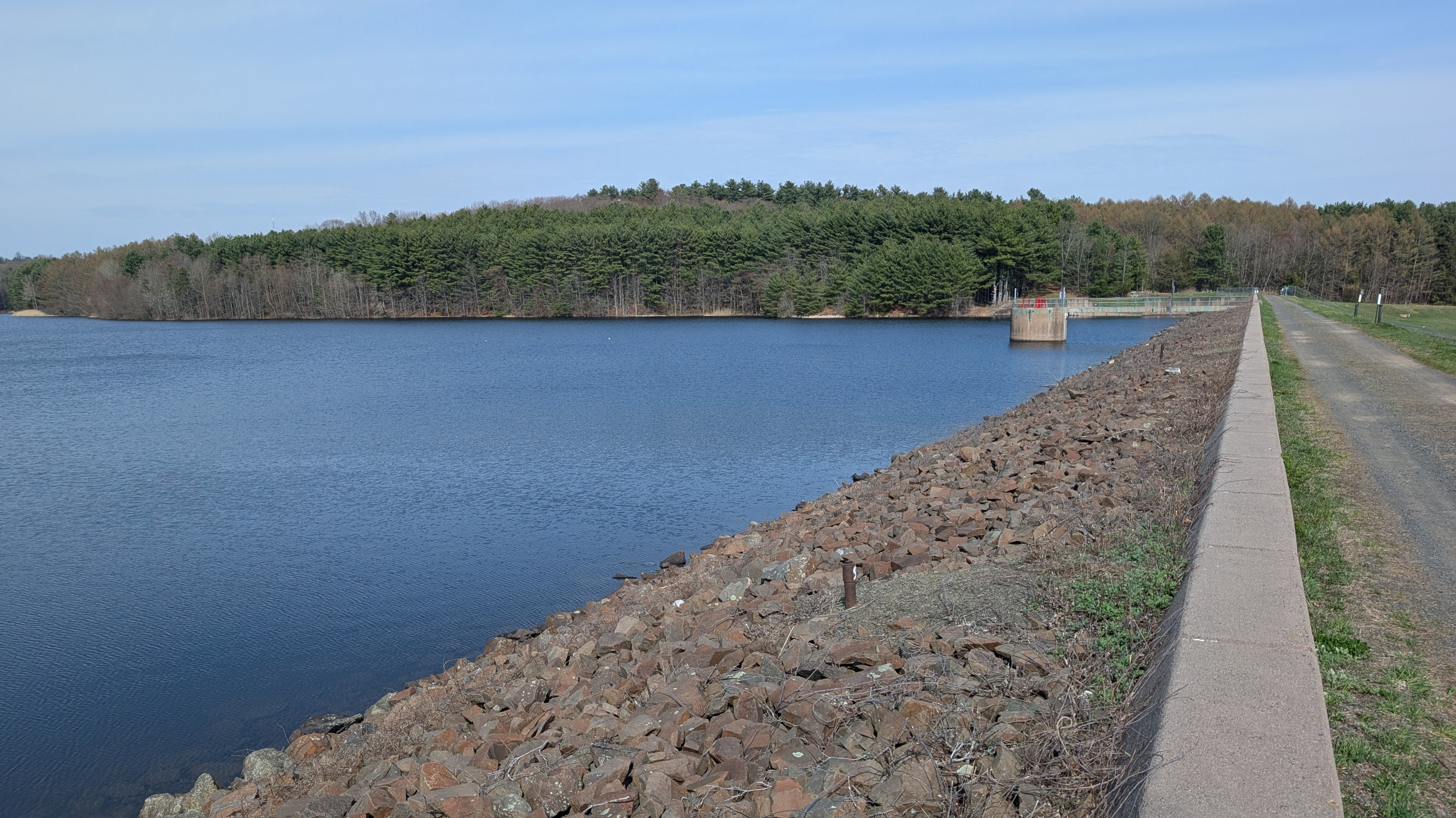
- Lake Chamberlain

- Location within Connecticut
- Location: Bethany, Connecticut, United States
- Coordinates: 41°23′55″N 72°59′16″W
- Type: Reservoir
- Basin countries: United States
- Surface area: 97 acres (0.39 km^{2})
- Max. depth: 64 feet (20 m)
- Surface elevation: 397 ft (121 m)

Lake Chamberlain is a reservoir in Bethany, Connecticut fed by the Sargent River. The lake and surrounding area is owned by the South Central Connecticut Regional Water Authority. Approximately 7.5 miles (12,100 m) of trails at the lake may be accessed by permit. The reservoir serves as part of the local water supply.

The Sargent River, a tributary of the West River, flows through the valley west of West Rock Ridge. Lake Chamberlain was constructed in 1890 and enlarged in 1958. The 1,300 feet (400 m) Lake Chamberlain Dam creates the reservoir holding 900 million US gallons (3,400,000 m^{3}) of water.
