= Agnes G. Doody =

Agnes Grace Doody
- Born: April 12, 1930; North Branford, Connecticut, US
- Died: April 28, 2023 (aged 93); South Kingstown, Rhode Island, US
- Known for: Pioneering the Speech Communications program at the University of Rhode Island and activist for racial justice and women's rights
- Spouse(s): Arthur David Jeffrey (m. 1962); Ellis Hoopes Maris, Jr. (m. 1992)

Academic background
- Education: Emerson College (B.A. 1954, English); Pennsylvania State University (M.A. 1954; Ph.D. 1961 English)
- Thesis: Words and Deeds: An Analysis of Jawaharlal Nehru's Non-alignment Policy in the Cold War

Agnes Grace Doody, Ph.D. (April 12, 1930 – April 28, 2023) was an academic primarily in the field of speech communication and faculty member for 45 years at the University of Rhode Island. She was engaged in philanthropy and civic engagement locally and around the State of Rhode Island.

== Early life and education ==
Agnes G. Doody was born 12 April 1930 in North Branford, Connecticut, to Daniel Michael Doody (1895-1980), a dairy farmer, and Carrie May (Goodrich) Doody (1896-1985), a teacher in the North Haven, Connecticut, school district. The Doody Dairy Farm was on 40 acres (160,000 m^{2}) of land at 465 Foxon Rd. in North Branford. In her early teen years Doody acted as an airplane spotter during World War II, and in 1946 she was the first female to win highest honors at the Connecticut State Fair for showing of the beef cattle that she had raised, and she was known for her proficiency in rifle marksmanship. Doody attended Hillhouse High School in New Haven, Connecticut. For college, she attended Central Connecticut State College and Emerson College for undergraduate studies, graduating from Emerson in 1954 with a B.A. degree and earned her M.A. at Penn State University in 1954 studying the speeches of Margaret Chase Smith. She also earned her Ph.D. degree at Penn State University in 1961.

== Academic career ==
Agnes Doody began her teaching career at Penn State University as a graduate student. In 1958, she joined the faculty of the University of Rhode Island as Director of Forensics (Public Speaking) in the Department of Speech and Theater, at a time when there were only 61 women faculty members out of a total 400. She was a fierce advocate for women's rights, particularly when she got into conflict with then university president Fran Horn who denied her a raise in pay for the reason that she was a married woman. Doody threatened to take out a full-page advertisement in the local newspaper explaining the gender inequities and denouncing Horn. She was then granted her raise. However, like Horn, she was a fierce defender of student free speech rights when it came to civil rights for ethnic minorities and protests stemming from the Vietnam War. In 1967, she founded and chaired the Department of Speech at URI. From 1968 to 1969, was Chairperson of the Faculty Senate during a time of controversial presidential transition at the university, and in subsequent years, she served several terms as a senator representing the College of Arts and Sciences.

Doody put a high value on excellence in teaching, chairing a Commission on Undergraduate Education that led to curriculum reforms, and she received commendation for teaching excellence from both URI and the Communication Association of America. She served in leadership roles in several professional societies, including the presidency of the New England Speech Association and the Eastern Communication Association, the Executive Committee of the Speech Association of Eastern States and as a Delegate Member of the Speech Association of America. She coached debate teams and pioneered business communications and conflict resolution courses. She cooperated with faculty the URI College of Business by developing and teaching a popular course in business etiquette, and developing and teaching an Executive MBA (EMBA) program for practicing business people.

In 1988, Doody was also admitted as the first woman member of the Rotary Club of Wakefield and she went on to be an active leader in the local organization, paving the way for other local women professionals. From 1989 until her death, she operated a speech communication consulting company, Arthur Associates, based at her home at 1 Post Road (now 234 Post Rd.), Wakefield, Rhode Island. In recognition of her numerous civic contributions, she was awarded awards from Rhode island civic organizations, including the New England Banking Board of Directors Association, the Big Sisters of Rhode Island, and the Women's Center of Rhode Island. She was awarded an honorary doctorate in Humane Letters at the 122nd URI Commencement in May, 2008.

== Personal life ==
She was married twice, first on 22 Dec 1962 to Naval Lieutenant Commander Arthur David Jeffrey, Ph.D. (1917-1985) and then to Ellis Hoopes Maris Jr. (1932-2005) in 1992.

== Retirement and legacy ==
Doody retired from the university in 2003, but remained active with university and community activities well into her retirement. She was particularly active as President of Rhode Island Mediation Services. In 2010, the University of Rhode Island honored her by naming the main lecture hall in Swan Hall on the URI campus as Agnes G. Doody Auditorium. She died on 28 April 2023 at age 93.
