= Connecticut Route 155 =

State highway in Middlesex County, Connecticut, US

Route 155
- Randolph Road
- Map of Middlesex County in southern Connecticut with Route 155 highlighted in red

Route information
- Maintained by CTDOT
- Length: 2.22 mi (3.57 km)
- Existed: 1933-34–present

Major junctions
- West end: Route 17 in Middletown
- East end: Route 9 / Randolph Road in Middletown

Location
- Country: United States
- State: Connecticut
- Counties: Middlesex

Highway system
- Connecticut State Highway System; Interstate; US; State; SSR; SR; Scenic
← Route 154	→ Route 156

Route 155 is a Connecticut state highway running entirely within the city of Middletown. It is primarily used as a connector between the Route 9 expressway and Route 17 towards Durham.

== Route description ==
Route 155 begins at an intersection with Route 17 in southern Middletown. It proceeds east through residential areas for about 2.1 miles (3.4 km) towards Route 9, crossing over Sumner Brook and Mill Brook along the way. Route 155 officially ends at the end of the northbound Route 9 off-ramp, which is about 100 yards (91 m) east of the Route 9 underpass. The entire length of Route 155 is known as Randolph Road. Randolph Road continues east for another 0.2 miles (0.32 km) as a local road to Saybrook Road, which was the pre-expressway alignment of Route 9. Route 155 is a minor arterial road and carries traffic volumes of about 10,100 per day.

== History ==
Route 155 was commissioned in 1933 or 1934 as an additional connection between Routes 9 and 17. The eastern terminus has since been shifted from Saybrook Road to the current location, when Route 9 was moved to its expressway alignment in 1967. The Route 155 exit off Route 9 is now signed as the route for Durham.

== Junction list ==
The entire route is in Middletown, Middlesex County.

mi	km	Destinations	Notes
0.00	0.00	Route 17 – Downtown Middletown, Durham	Western terminus
2.16	3.48	Route 9 – Old Saybrook, New Britain	Exit 21 on Route 9
2.22	3.57	Randolph Road	Continuation east
1.000 mi = 1.609 km; 1.000 km = 0.621 mi
