= Lake Saltonstall (Connecticut) =

Lake in the American state of Connecticut

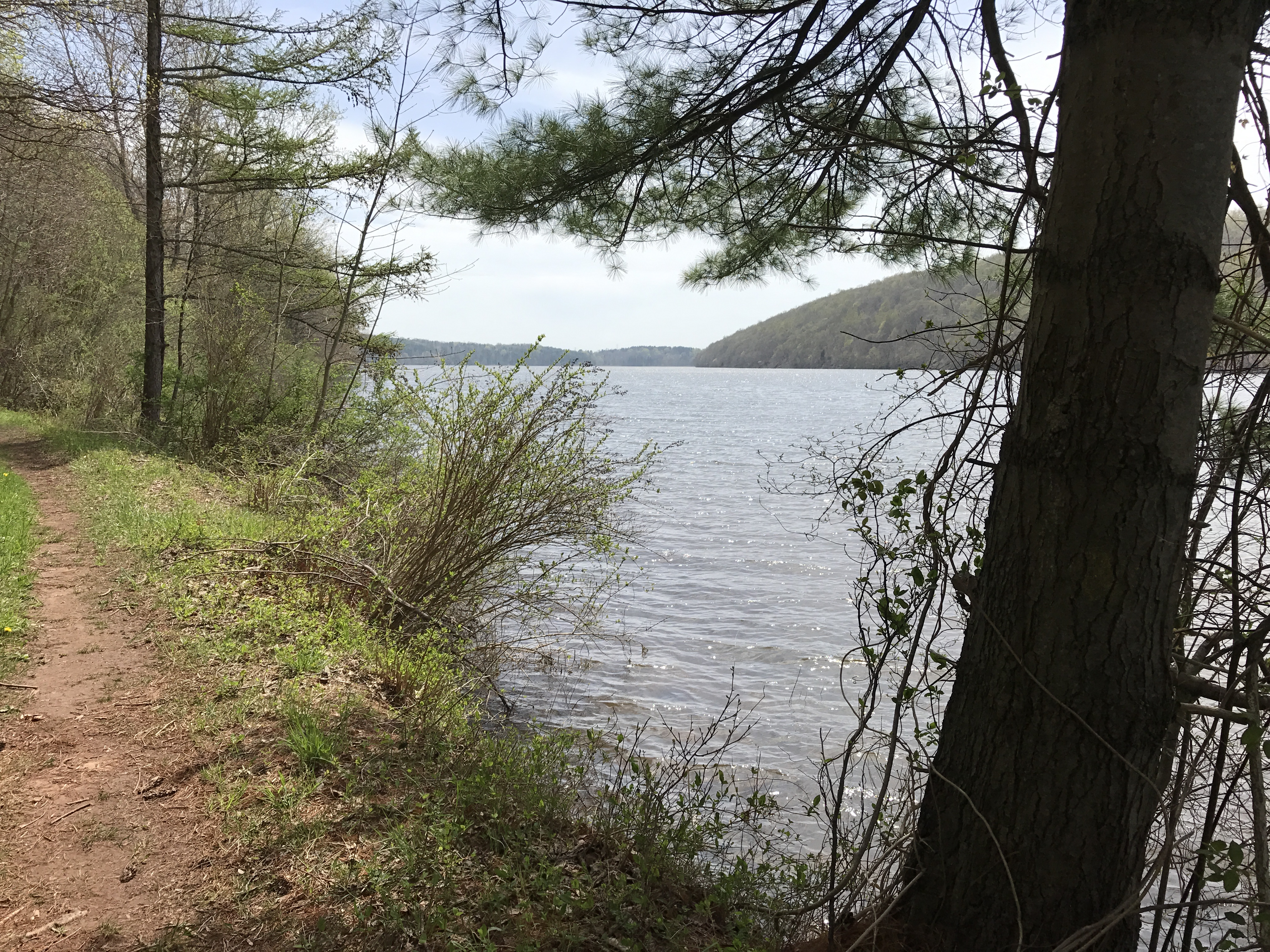
- Lake Saltonstall and the RWA trail on the east side of the lake

- Location within Connecticut
- Location: Branford / East Haven, Connecticut, United States
- Coordinates: 41°17′42″N 72°50′46″W
- Type: Reservoir
- Basin countries: United States
- Surface area: 0.66 square miles (1.7 km^{2})
- Average depth: 41 feet (12 m)
- Max. depth: 113 feet (34 m)
- Surface elevation: 23 ft (7.0 m)

Lake Saltonstall (Lonotonoquet in Quinnipiac), is a long narrow lake located in south-central Connecticut. It covers an area of approximately 0.66 square miles (1.7 km^{2}) and is nestled in the center of the trap rock Saltonstall Mountain. The lake is surrounded by forest and serves as part of the local water supply for surrounding towns.

The lake and the area around it is owned by the South Central Connecticut Regional Water Authority, a company which also regulates fishing and rents boats. Private boats are not allowed. A permit may be purchased, which provides access to hiking trails, fishing and boat rentals at Lake Saltonstall and other properties owned and maintained by the RWA.

There are a variety of fish native to Lake Saltonstall in addition to those that are stocked by the RWA. Fish in Lake Saltonstall include largemouth bass, smallmouth bass, black crappie, walleye, trout, yellow perch and carp.

Interstate 95 runs across the southern edge of the lake, connecting the towns of East Haven, Connecticut and Branford, Connecticut.

Lake Saltonstall's maximum depth does not exceed 113 feet (34 m) and its mean depth is 41 feet (12 m).
