= Matthew Kluger =

American former lawyer

Matthew Kluger is a disbarred lawyer who served a 12-year sentence in federal prison for insider trading. The Bureau of Prisons Inmate Information website states that his release date was January 13, 2022. A graduate of the Hammonasset School, Cornell University, and NYU School of Law, Kluger is the son of Pulitzer Prize-winning writer Richard Kluger. Over 17 years, while a lawyer at the law firms Cravath, Swaine & Moore, Skadden, Arps, Slate, Meagher & Flom, Fried, Frank, Harris, Shriver & Jacobson, and Wilson Sonsini Goodrich & Rosati, he tipped the identity of planned corporate takeover targets, allowing confederates to reap millions in profits when the proposed takeovers were announced and the stock prices increased. His sentence, which was reportedly the longest ever imposed after a guilty plea for insider trading, was affirmed by the U.S. Court of Appeals for the Third Circuit in 2013. He explained in detail the nature of his conduct in a video interview. In 2014, he gave an extensive interview with Fortune Magazine about the details of his life in prison. His conduct was featured on an episode of the CNBC series American Greed. A motion to vacate his sentence was denied in 2018.

== Personal life ==
Kluger is gay and has three children with a former boyfriend.
