= Hammonasset School =

Private day school in Madison, Connecticut, US

The Hammonasset School

Location
- 156 Duck Hole Road; Madison, Connecticut 06443; United States
- Coordinates: 41.2957°N 72.57616°W

Information
- Type: private day school
- Established: 1971
- Closed: 1991
- CEEB code: 070367
- Teaching staff: 20 Full & Part Time
- Grades: 8-12
- Campus size: 56 acres (23 ha)
- Campus type: Suburban
- Colors: Green and White
- Accreditation: NAIS
- Newspaper: The Generic News
- Yearbook: Leaves of Time

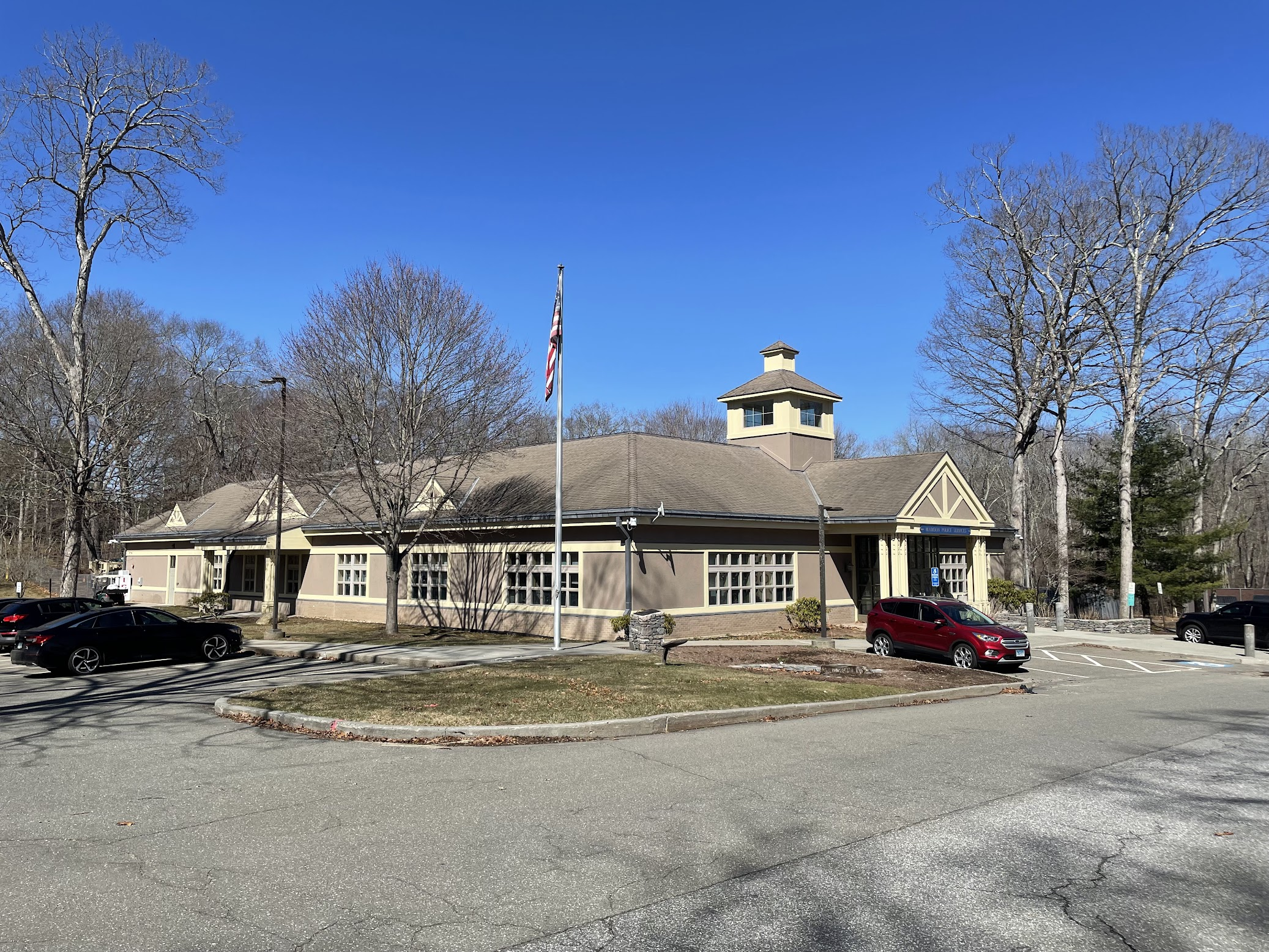
One of the former school buildings; now Madison Police Services

The Hammonasset School was a progressive, college preparatory, coeducational day school located in Madison, Connecticut. Founded in 1971 by a group including Anna Hale Bowditch and Mr. & Mrs. Walter Macguire, Hammonasset was noted for its visual and performing arts programs. Operating for 18 academic years, Hammonasset closed its doors in 1991, succumbing to the early 1990s recession and a declining teenage population. The campus was subsequently purchased by the Town of Madison and converted to the Madison Town Campus, which houses the town’s offices as well as recreational facilities. All of the original buildings, although renovated to varying degrees, still stand today.

== Facilities ==
The main academic and administrative building featured a working fireplace, a large, open classroom space, a science lab, a faculty lounge, and administrative offices. This building today houses the Madison Town Offices. The Arts Barn, as the name implies, was home to Hammonasset’s popular visual and performing arts programs. The building now houses a youth center and community-access TV facilities, and is still referred to as the “Arts Barn”. The Gymnasium building featured a fitness center, locker rooms, a first aid room, and athletic department offices. The building continues to be used for athletic and recreational programs by the Town of Madison. The 56-acre (23 ha) campus on the Hammonasset River also featured athletic fields, tennis courts, and hiking trails, all of which continue to exist today.

== Student life ==
Featuring a college-like atmosphere, Hammonasset’s students were afforded freedom that was not found at many other high schools. This was a large part of the school’s goal of fostering independence in the students. Academic performance was evaluated not only by a written teacher evaluation, but also by a written self-evaluation by each student, which allowed the opportunity for self-reflection and to help the student identify opportunities for improvement.

== Academics ==
In addition to the typical offerings of high-school-level courses, Hammonasset required completion of two major projects by juniors and seniors.

Juniors were required to complete the Junior Independent Research Paper (JIRP), a ten-page paper intended to acquaint the student with secondary research. The topic was chosen by the student and fulfilling this requirement also fulfilled the English requirement for that term. Students had to successfully complete the JIRP to become a senior.

Seniors were required to complete an extensive independent project called a Senior Masterwork. This project could be done in any field, academic or otherwise, and could take virtually any form.

== Notable alumni ==
- Knox Chandler, musician.
- Matthew Kluger, disbarred lawyer convicted of insider trading.
- Chris Korda, musician and leader of the Church of Euthanasia.
- Dana Perry, 2015 Academy Award winner for producing Crisis Hotline: Veterans Press 1
- Chloe Dzubilo, trans femme artist, organizer, and long-term HIV survivor.
- Tony Scherr, musician.
- Jonah Smith, owner Aether Apparel
