= Connecticut Route 79 =

State highway in southern Connecticut, US

Route 79
- Map of southern Connecticut with Route 79 highlighted in red

Route information
- Maintained by CTDOT
- Length: 14.34 mi (23.08 km)
- Existed: 1932–present

Major junctions
- South end: US 1 in Madison
- I-95 in Madison
- North end: Route 17 in Durham

Location
- Country: United States
- State: Connecticut
- Counties: New Haven, Middlesex

Highway system
- Connecticut State Highway System; Interstate; US; State; SSR; SR; Scenic
← Route 78	→ Route 80

Route 79 is a 14.34-mile (23.08 km) state highway in southern Connecticut from Madison to Durham.

== Route description ==
Route 79 begins at US 1 in Madison center and heads north across I-95 (at Exit 61). It continues north, intersecting with Horse Pond Road (an unsigned state road designated as Special Service Road 450), which leads to the town offices, and eventually, Hammonasset Beach State Park. Route 79 continues into the village of North Madison where it has an intersection with Route 80 at a roundabout. The road continues north into the town of Killingworth, intersecting Route 148 just south of the town line with Durham. The road runs north for another 2.3 miles (3.7 km) within Durham before ending at Route 17 south of the town center. Route 79 is known as Durham Road within Madison, Madison-Durham Road within Killingworth, and Madison Road within Durham.

== History ==
In the 19th century, the road from Madison to Durham was known as the Durham and East Guilford Turnpike, a private toll-road established in 1811. When the state took over maintenance of trunkline routes in 1922, the alignment of the old turnpike was designated as State Highway 190. Route 79 was established in the 1932 state highway renumbering as a simple number change of old Highway 190. Portions of the route in Madison were straightened in the 1940s.

== Junction list ==
County	Location	mi	km	Destinations	Notes
New Haven	Madison	0.00	0.00	US 1 – Clinton, Guilford	Southern terminus
New Haven	Madison	0.61	0.98	I-95 – New London, New Haven	Exit 64 on I-95
New Haven	Madison	3.12	5.02	Horse Pond Road (SSR 450 south)	
New Haven	Madison	6.13	9.87	Route 80 – Killingworth, North Branford	Roundabout
Middlesex	Killingworth	11.79	18.97	Route 148 east – Killingworth Center, Chester	Western terminus of Route 148
Middlesex	Durham	14.34	23.08	Route 17 – Middletown, Northford	Northern terminus
1.000 mi = 1.609 km; 1.000 km = 0.621 mi
