= South Central Connecticut Regional Water Authority =

The South Central Connecticut Regional Water Authority (SCCRWA)
- Formerly: New Haven Water Company
- Industry: Water Utility
- Founder: Eli Whitney II
- Headquarters: New Haven, Connecticut
- Area served: South Central Connecticut
- Website: www.rwater.com

The South Central Connecticut Regional Water Authority (SCCRWA or RWA) is a public water supply utility in Connecticut, United States. The RWA supplies water in a 15-town region with a population of about 430,000. The RWA acts as a steward of the environment in the local region by protecting more than 26,000 acres of watershed lands, and promoting sustainability.

The South Central Connecticut Regional Water Authority is a non-profit public corporation and political subdivision of the State of Connecticut, but its core business was originally established and operated as the New Haven Water Company, a private business.

The RWA produces on average 55 million gallons of water daily. One of its conduits is the Genesee Tunnel.

== History ==
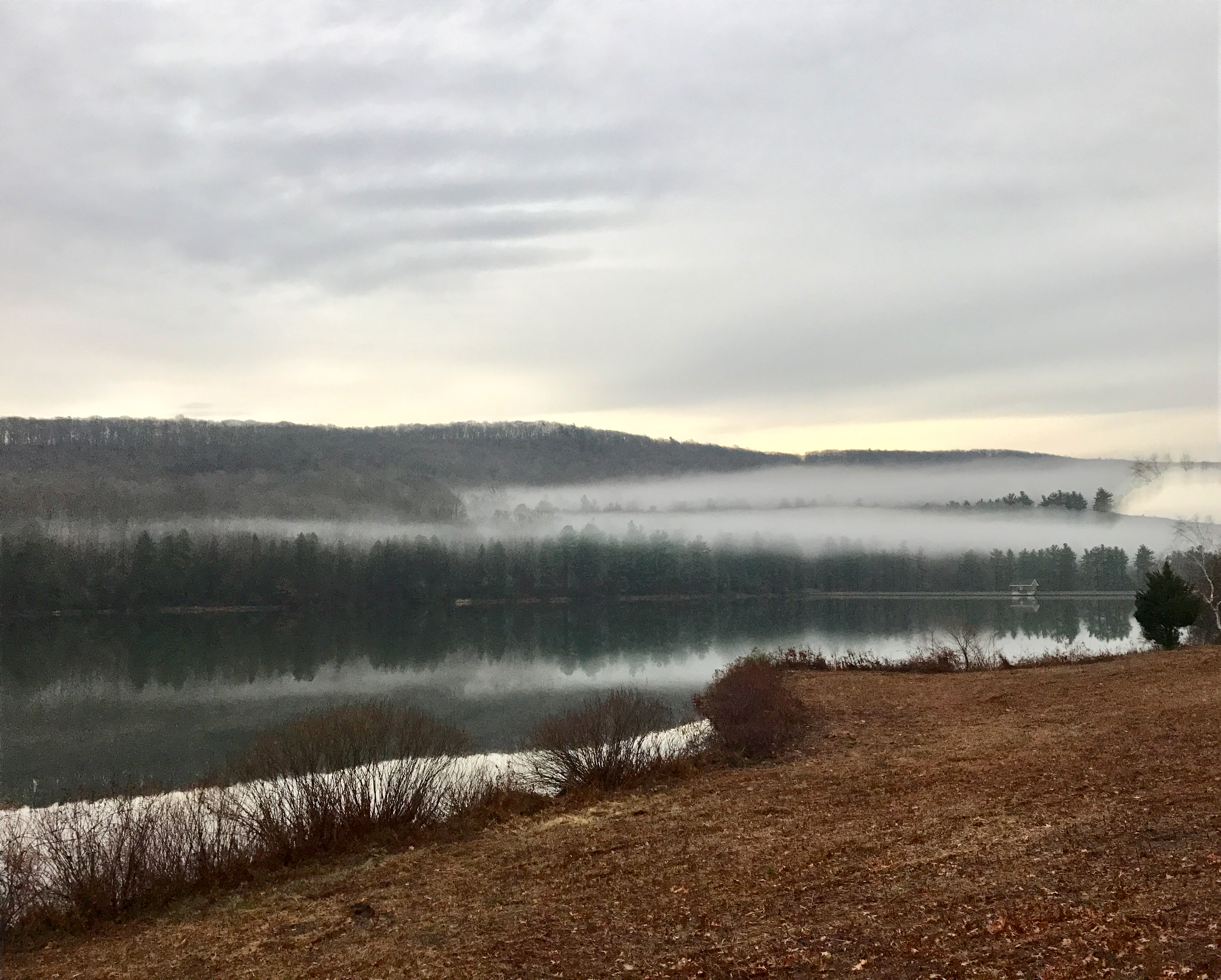
South Central Connecticut Regional Water Authority's Lake Watrous in Woodbridge Connecticut reflecting West Rock Ridge shrouded in early morning mist. The dam is in the distance on the far right.

The South Central Connecticut Regional Water Authority was originally established in 1849 as the New Haven Water Company. One of the company's founders was Eli Whitney II. In 1849, Whitney began construction of a dam that impounded the Mill River to form a reservoir, which is now named Lake Whitney. When the Safe Drinking Water Act was implemented in the 1970s, the former New Haven Water Company planned to sell off watershed lands to offset costs associated with maintaining compliance with the drinking water standards. Seeing the loss of public lands as an ecological loss and potentially detrimental to source water quality, the state assembly stepped in and reformed the New Haven Water Company into a new quasi-governmental organization.

The South Central Connecticut Regional Water Authority was established in 1977 by the Connecticut General Assembly and purchased the assets of the New Haven Water Company in 1980. In January 2008, the RWA purchased the former Ansonia division of Birmingham Utilities, which added Ansonia, Derby, and Seymour to its service area, which also includes the towns of Bethany, Branford, Cheshire, East Haven, Hamden, Milford, New Haven, North Branford, North Haven, Orange, West Haven and Woodbridge.

== Reservoirs ==
Drinking water distributed by the RWA comes from 10 reservoirs and three aquifers. Over 80 percent of drinking water supplied in the RWA district originates from four reservoir systems: North Branford, Saltonstall, West River and Whitney. The rest of the RWA's water comes from wellfields that draw from the Quinnipiac and Mill River Aquifers located in Cheshire and Hamden, as well as the Housatonic River aquifer in Derby and Seymour.

== Recreation Program ==
The RWA makes select watershed areas available for hiking, fishing and other activities through its recreation program. Recreation program permit holders can access more than 50 miles of trails and five reservoirs in nine recreation areas spread across 13 communities in Greater New Haven. Revenue generated from the recreation program is used to support the RWA's conservation work.

RWA recreation permit holders are able to enjoy the following recreation properties: Lake Saltonstall, Maltby Lakes, Hammonasset, Sugarloaf Hills, Genesee, Big Gulph, Lake Bethany, Pine Hill, and Lake Chamberlain. The RWA regularly holds fishing competitions, nature walks and other family-friends events for recreation permit holders.

== HazWaste Central ==
On Saturdays from mid-May to October, the RWA opens HazWaste Central, the only permanent household hazardous waste collection facility in Connecticut. Residents from towns participating in HazWaste Central can drop off their household hazardous waste items for free. Household hazardous waste items include: kitchen and bathroom cleaning products, nail polish remover, gasoline, paint thinner, antifreeze, auto batteries, used motor oil, latex and oil-based paints, pesticides, batteries, fluorescent light bulbs and more. Once hazardous waste items have been turned over, they will be safely disposed of through incineration, placement in special landfills, or recycled and reused if it is possible to do so.

HazWaste Central helps protect the water resources in Greater New Haven, while providing cost-effective municipal services. Because the chemicals are safely collected, the land and important waterways are not polluted. Current HazWaste Central participating towns are: Bethany, Branford, East Haven, Fairfield, Guilford, Hamden, Madison, Meriden, Milford, New Haven, North Branford, Orange, Wallingford, West Haven and Woodbridge.
