= West River (Connecticut) =

River in Connecticut, United States

Coordinates: 41.3120°N 72.9613°W

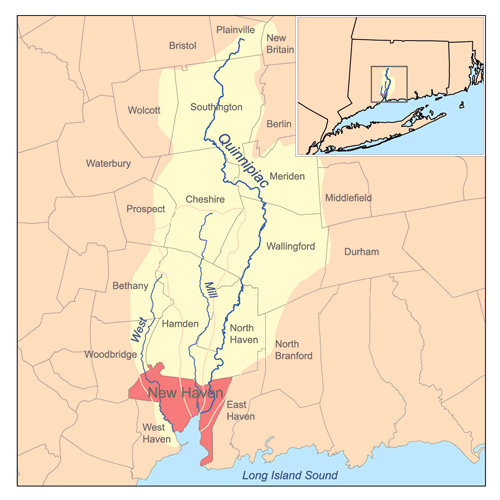
Map showing the West River watershed.

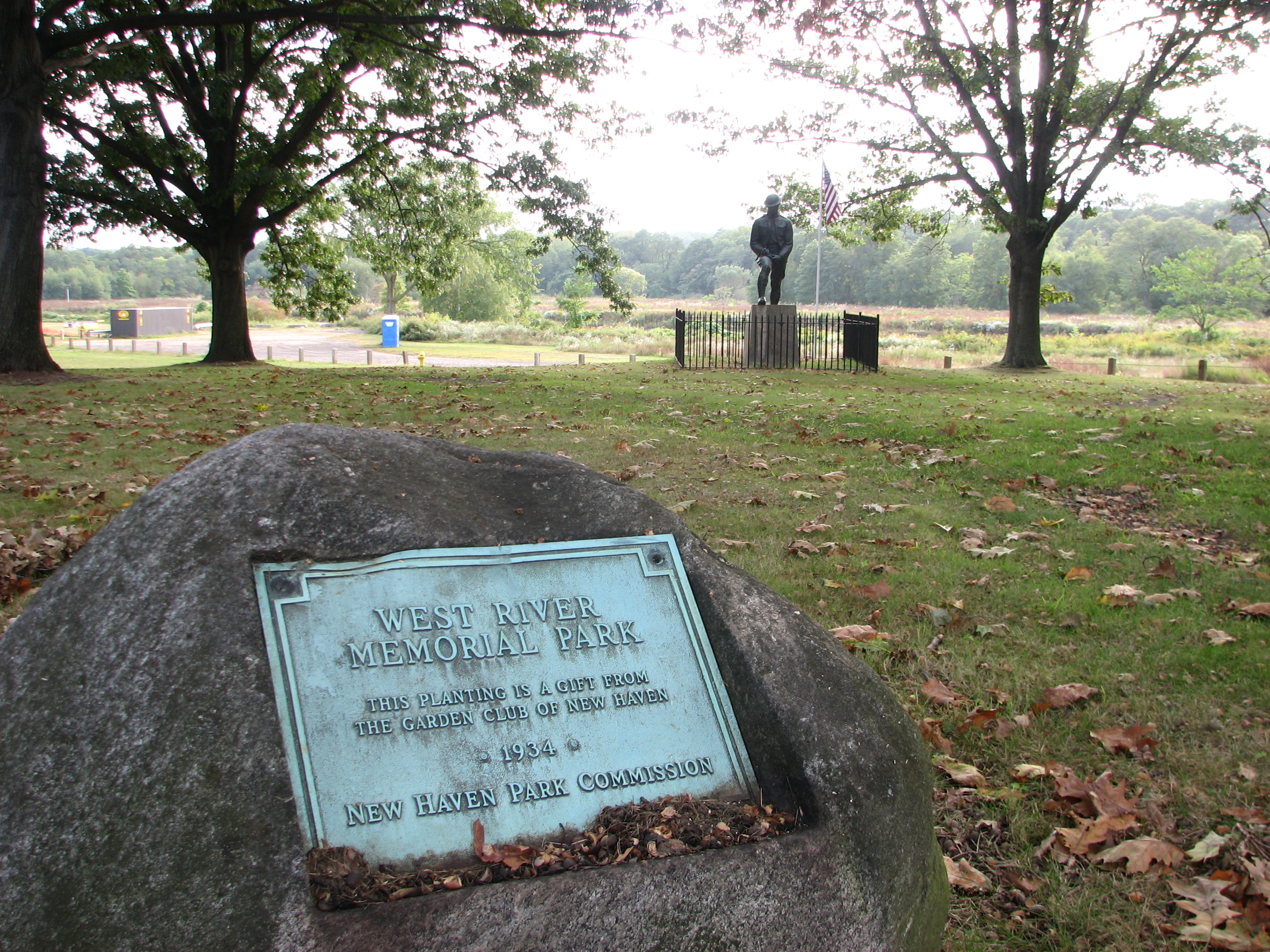
West River Memorial Park.

The West River is a 13.5-mile-long (21.7 km) freshwater stream in southern Connecticut. It flows through the towns of Bethany, Woodbridge, New Haven, and West Haven before discharging into New Haven Harbor.

Within the city of New Haven, the river is surrounded by Edgewood Park and the West River Memorial Park along much of its length. While the river's natural channel winds along the western edge of the West River Memorial Park, a very straight channel (a former rowing course) cuts through its middle and terminates at the park's northern edge (Derby Avenue). There is a public canoe launch, maintained by the City of New Haven Department of Parks, Recreation, and Trees, in the constructed channel at Derby Avenue.

== Dams ==
The river is dammed in several places and some of the reservoirs are used by the South Central Connecticut Regional Water Authority to provide a percentage of the public water supply. The reservoirs are named Konolds Pond, Lake Dawson, Lake Watrous, and Lake Bethany, in order from south to north.

== Rowing Course ==
A rowing course was constructed along the river in New Haven in what is now West River Memorial Park in 1920. At the time, the Yale athletic program studied the idea of building a larger course for use in collegiate rowing competitions, but evidently decided against it. During the mid-1970s, there were further plans for the expansion of the rowing course into an "Olympic rowing course", but these plans never came to fruition. The development by the International Rowing Course Foundation would have included a grandstand with seating for 5,000 people and a variety of other athletic facilities.

== Tide gate ==
Around 1920, the City of New Haven installed flapper style tide gates downstream of Orange Avenue (U.S. Route 1). The gates were installed to control mosquitos, to provide flood control, and to allow areas of the salt water marsh to be filled to provide for additional land for development. However, the flapper gates degraded the environment in several ways: they blocked fish passage upstream to historic spawning areas; they change the vegetation to a fresh water regime; they limited the extent of flushing in the reflecting pool; and they reduced tidal influence up to and including the Duck Pond in Edgewood Park. This change to a fresh water regime allowed invasive species to overrun the river's banks. Most notably aggressive root systems and dense growth patterns allowed the common reed (Phragmites australis) to crowd out a variety of native species.

The degraded nature of the river was recognized for several decades through studies by Yale University and by private consultants hired by the City of New Haven. In 2009, a grant under the American Recovery and Reinvestment Act and distributed by NOAA funded the West River Habitat Restoration Project, managed by Connecticut Fund for the Environment, a local environmental nonprofit. After several revisions to the plans, based on neighborhood input, the project was completed in 2012. This project removed 3 of the 12 existing flapper tide gates and installed 3 self-regulating tide gates (SRT). These SRTs allowed water to exit the river when the river was higher than the harbor tide and allowed salt water to enter the river system when the tide rose above the river. The SRTs are also designed to close when the incoming tide is extremely high and would cause damage to the existing infrastructure upstream.

It will take years for the habitat of the river to return to pre-1920 conditions (or anything similar to those conditions) but some immediate improvements have been noted. The Phragmite population is showing signs of being stressed, acres of tidal wetland have been restored, and anecdotal evidence of increased fish passage has been reported.

== See also ==
- List of rivers of Connecticut
