= Quinnipiac Meadows =

Neighborhood in New Haven, Connecticut

Coordinates: 41.325°N 72.877°W

Quinnipiac Meadows, also known as Bishop Woods, is a neighborhood in the northeast corner of the city of New Haven, Connecticut located east of the Quinnipiac River and north of Fair Haven and Fair Haven Heights. It contains a considerable wetlands area which is a nature preserve. The area is bordered on the north by the town of North Haven, on the east by the town of East Haven, on the south by Route 80, on the southwest by Interstate 91 (between Exits 7 and 8), and on the west by the Amtrak railroad tracks (along the banks of the Quinnipiac River). The portion of the area west of I-91 is also part of the community known as Cedar Hill.

== Bibliography ==
=== Print ===
- The Streets of New Haven - The Origin of Their Names, 2nd edition 1998 ISBN 0-943143-02-0
