= Madison Center, Connecticut =

Census-designated place in Connecticut, United States

- Census-designated place
- Location within Connecticut Location within the United States
- Coordinates: 41°16′44″N 72°36′0″W
- Country: United States
- State: Connecticut
- County: New Haven
- Town: Madison

Area
  - Total: 2.05 sq mi (5.32 km^{2})
  - Land: 2.04 sq mi (5.28 km^{2})
  - Water: 0.012 sq mi (0.03 km^{2})
- Elevation: 22 ft (6.7 m)

Population (2010)
  - Total: 2,290
  - Density: 1,122/sq mi (433.3/km^{2})
- Time zone: UTC-5 (Eastern (EST))
  - Summer (DST): UTC-4 (EDT)
- ZIP Code: 06443 (Madison)
- Area codes: 203/475
- FIPS code: 09-44630
- GNIS feature ID: 2377830

Madison Center is a census-designated place (CDP) comprising the primary village and surrounding residential land in the town of Madison, New Haven County, Connecticut, United States. It is in the southern part of the town, surrounding the intersection of U.S. Route 1 with Connecticut Route 79 (Durham Road). The CDP extends south to Long Island Sound, north to Interstate 95, east to Fence Creek, and west to Long Shore Land and Stony Lane.

As of the 2020 census, Madison Center had a population of 2,250.

== Demographics ==
=== 2020 census ===
As of the 2020 census, Madison Center had a population of 2,250. The median age was 58.4 years. 13.9% of residents were under the age of 18 and 33.6% of residents were 65 years of age or older. For every 100 females there were 84.9 males, and for every 100 females age 18 and over there were 84.5 males age 18 and over.

100.0% of residents lived in urban areas, while 0.0% lived in rural areas.

There were 1,142 households in Madison Center, of which 15.9% had children under the age of 18 living in them. Of all households, 44.3% were married-couple households, 19.6% were households with a male householder and no spouse or partner present, and 31.9% were households with a female householder and no spouse or partner present. About 40.7% of all households were made up of individuals and 24.3% had someone living alone who was 65 years of age or older.

There were 1,400 housing units, of which 18.4% were vacant. The homeowner vacancy rate was 1.0% and the rental vacancy rate was 7.9%.

Racial composition as of the 2020 census
Race	Number	Percent
White	2,068	91.9%
Black or African American	18	0.8%
American Indian and Alaska Native	3	0.1%
Asian	58	2.6%
Native Hawaiian and Other Pacific Islander	0	0.0%
Some other race	6	0.3%
Two or more races	97	4.3%
Hispanic or Latino (of any race)	69	3.1%
