= Clinton (CDP), Connecticut =

Clinton, Connecticut
- Census-designated place
- Location within Connecticut Location within the United States
- Coordinates: 41°16′42″N 72°31′37″W
- Country: United States
- State: Connecticut
- County: Middlesex
- Town: Clinton

Area
  - Total: 2.68 sq mi (6.93 km^{2})
  - Land: 2.39 sq mi (6.20 km^{2})
  - Water: 0.28 sq mi (0.73 km^{2})
- Elevation: 22 ft (6.7 m)

Population (2020)
  - Total: 3,441
  - Density: 1,438/sq mi (555.3/km^{2})
- Time zone: UTC-5 (Eastern (EST))
  - Summer (DST): UTC-4 (EDT)
- ZIP Code: 06413
- Area codes: 860/959
- FIPS code: 09-15420
- GNIS feature ID: 2378347

Clinton is a census-designated place (CDP) comprising the primary village in the town of Clinton, Middlesex County, Connecticut, United States. It is in the southwestern corner of the town, bordered to the west, across the Hammonasset River, by the town of Madison in New Haven County, to the north by Interstate 95, and to the south by Clinton Harbor, an inlet of Long Island Sound. As of the 2020 census, the CDP had a population of 3,441, out of 13,185 in the entire town of Clinton.

The Clinton Village Historic District occupies 120 acres (0.49 km^{2}) at the center of the village.
