= Hammonasset River =

River in Durham, Connecticut, US

Coordinates: 41.27768°N 72.54751°W

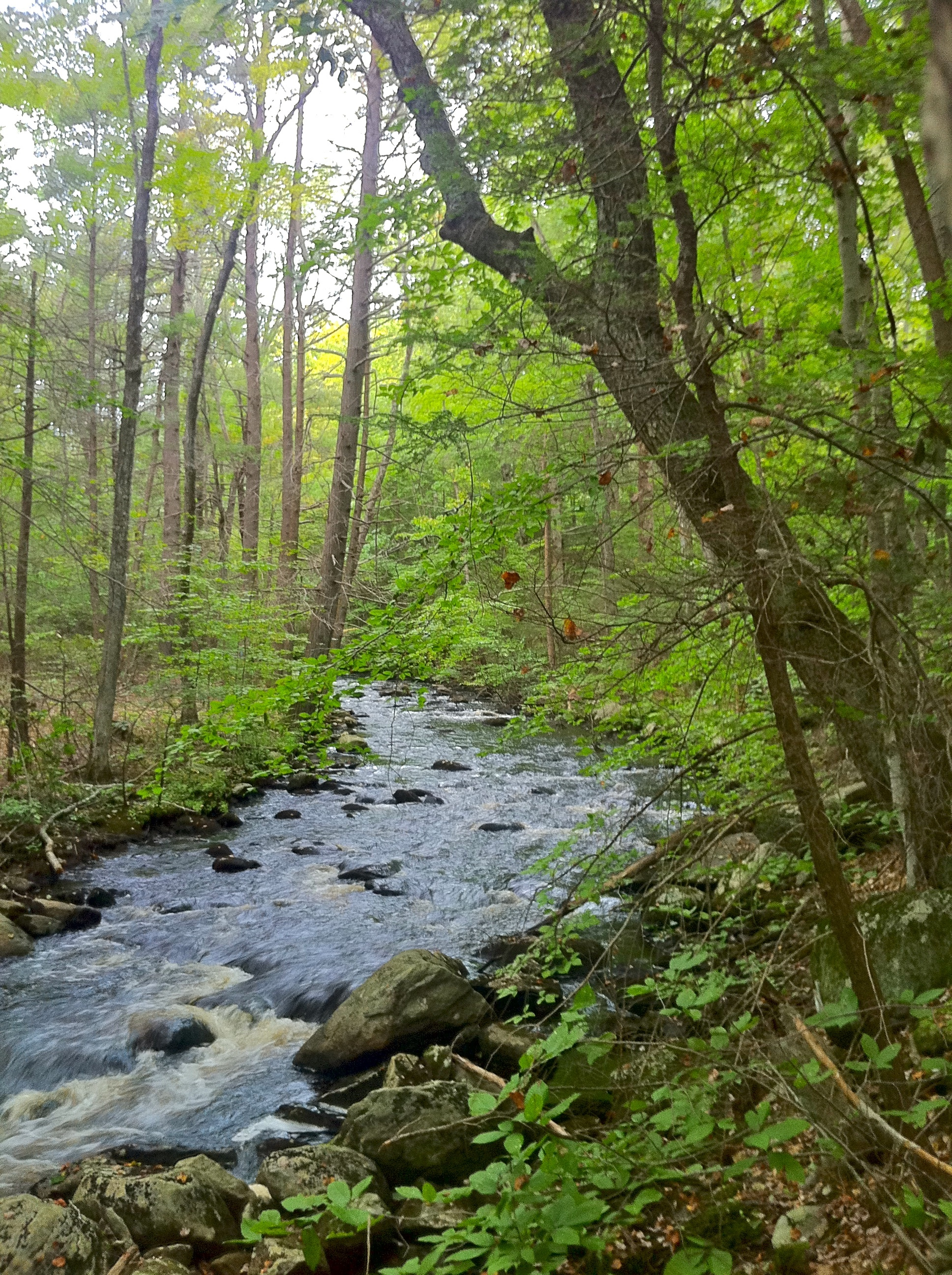
Hammonassett River - Madison and Killingworth

The Hammonasset River is formed about 4 miles (6.4 km) southeast of Durham, Connecticut along a gully on the north end of Bunker Hill at about a half mile northeast of the junction of Route 148 and Bunker Hill Road. The river travels for 21.0 miles (33.8 km) to Clinton Harbor on Long Island Sound just east of Hammonasset Beach State Park. A popular paddling route runs for about 10 miles (16 km) starting along Summer Hill Road about 2.5 miles (4.0 km) south on Route 79 from North Madison, Connecticut. This is a scenic river run with mostly flat and quickwater, but with a few Class I-II whitewater areas.

The Hammonasset were a tribe of Algonquian Native Americans who had their "digging grounds" in this part of Connecticut, from the west bank of the Connecticut River to the Hammonasset River along the coast. The act of the Connecticut General Court, May 10, 1666, that established New London County mentioned as the county's western bounds "Homonoscet Plantation", which was settled by the English in 1663, now Killingworth. The name was also spelled "Homonoscitt" in some records.

== See also ==
- Genesee Tunnel
- List of rivers of Connecticut
