= Guilford Historic Town Center =

Historic district in Connecticut, United States

- U.S. National Register of Historic Places
- U.S. Historic district
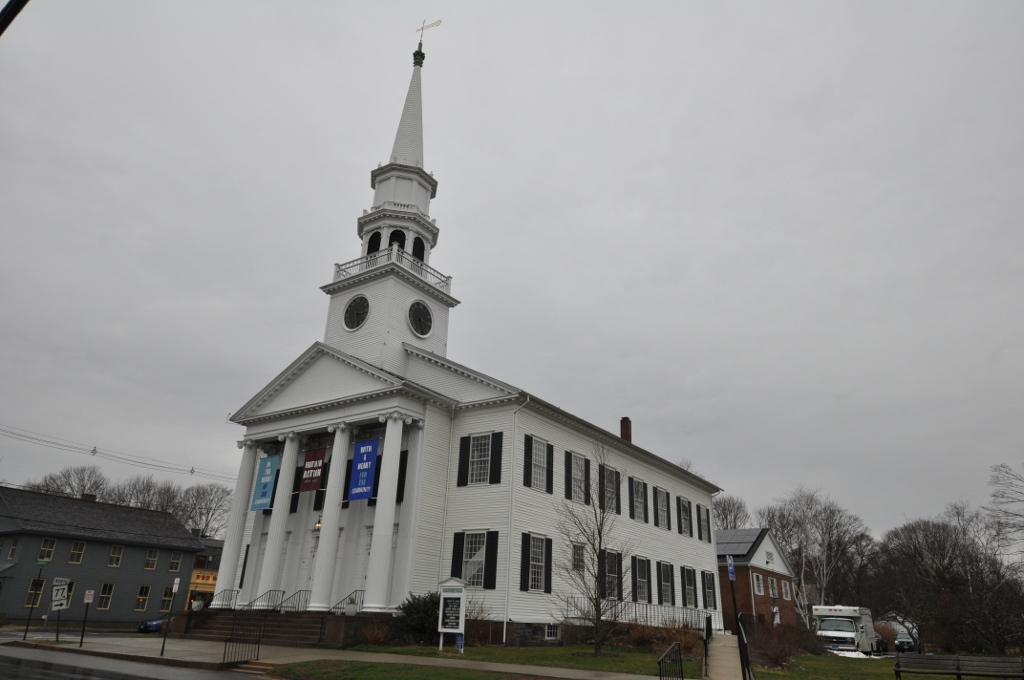
- First Congregational Church

- Location within Connecticut Location within the United States
- Location: Bounded by West River, Interstate 95, East Creek and Long Island Sound, Guilford, Connecticut
- Coordinates: 41°16′49″N 72°40′37″W
- Area: 1,752 acres (709 ha)
- Built: 1639
- Architectural style: Greek Revival, Colonial, Federal
- NRHP reference No.: 76001988
- Added to NRHP: July 6, 1976

Guilford Historic Town Center is a large historic district encompassing the entire town center of Guilford, Connecticut, United States. It is centered on the town green, laid out in 1639, and extends north to Interstate 95, South to Long Island Sound, west to the West River, and east to East Creek. It includes more than 600 historic structures, most built between the late 17th and early 20th centuries, reflecting the town's growth and history during that time. It was listed on the National Register of Historic Places in 1976.

The town center has been listed as a census-designated place (CDP) since 2008. As of the 2010 census, the Guilford Center CDP had a population of 2,597, out of 22,375 in the entire town of Guilford.

== Description and history ==
The town of Guilford was settled by Englishmen of the Connecticut Colony in 1639, after purchasing the land from Native Americans. The town green was laid out at that time, and the town developed an economy that was largely based on agriculture and fishing until the mid-20th century. It experienced a brief shipbuilding boom in the late 18th and early 19th century, but saw relatively little industrial activity, and is now a largely suburban residential community. The town center exhibits an architectural diversity that is reflective of 300 years of relatively gradual development, and has only been significantly encroached upon by the modern alignment of Route 1, which is lined with modern services, and the late 19th-century railroad tracks that are part of the Northeast Corridor.

The historic district encompasses an area of about four square miles. Portions of this area near the eastern and western boundaries (East Creek and the West River, respectively) are still lined with salt marshes, which hearken back to the area's agricultural economy. The district includes Connecticut's oldest stone house, the Henry Whitfield House, built in 1639 and now a museum. Whitfield was the town's first minister, and his house was where Congregationalist services were held prior to construction of the first colonial meeting house. The town green, whose shape is virtually unaltered since it was laid out in 1639, is lined with commercial, civic, and religious buildings that span the centuries in age. The current Congregational church, located at the north end of the green, dates to 1829. The town hall is on the east side of the common; it was built in the late 19th century, but was much altered in the 1940s, and no longer carries its historical Romanesque features.

== See also ==
- National Register of Historic Places listings in New Haven County, Connecticut
