= Northford, Connecticut =

Census-designated place in Connecticut, United States

- Census-designated place
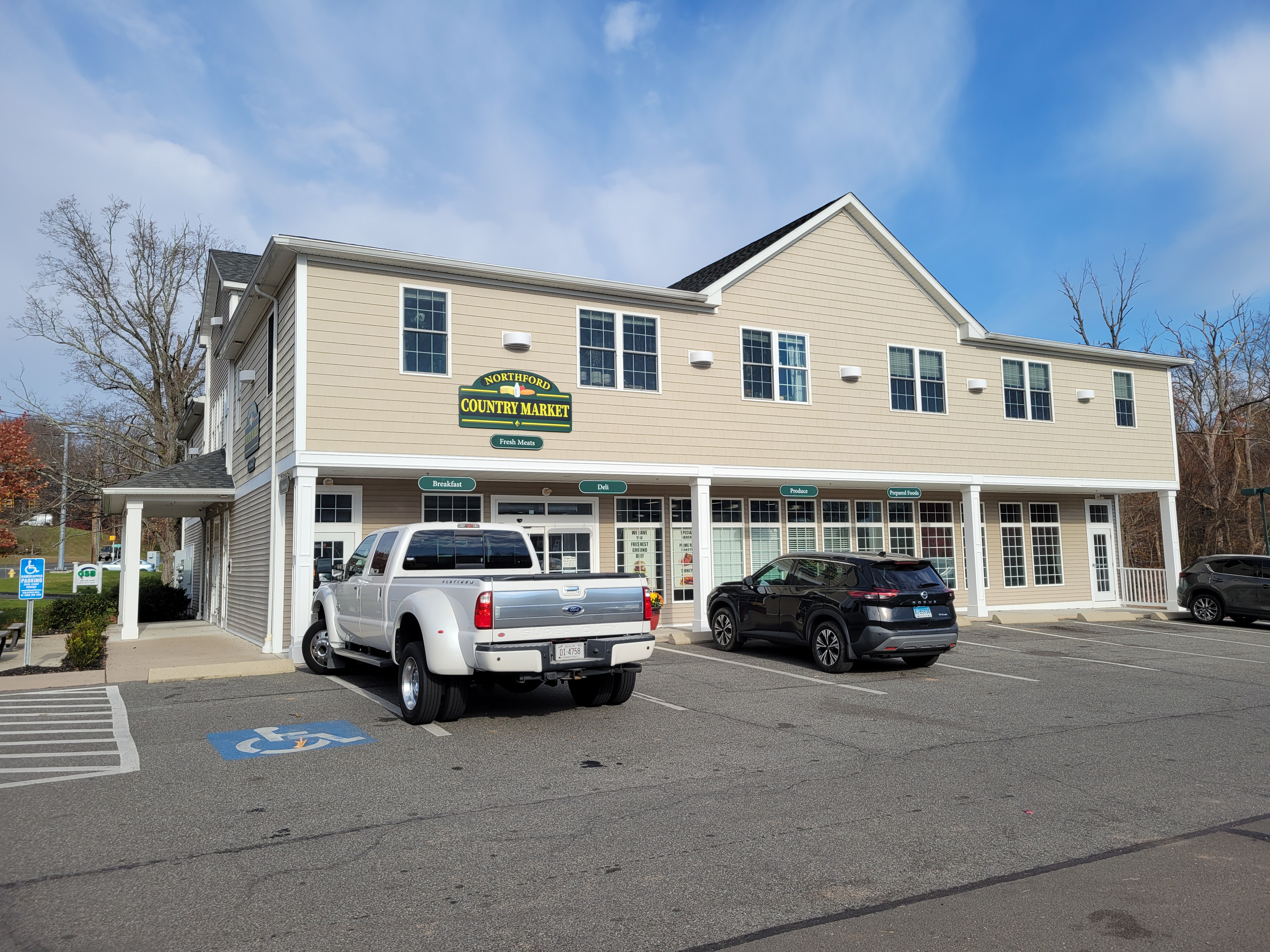
- Northford Country Market

- Location within Connecticut Location within the United States
- Coordinates: 41°23′31″N 72°47′31″W
- Country: United States
- State: Connecticut
- County: New Haven
- Town: North Branford

Area
  - Total: 8.00 sq mi (20.71 km^{2})
  - Land: 7.98 sq mi (20.68 km^{2})
  - Water: 0.012 sq mi (0.03 km^{2})
- Elevation: 210 ft (64 m)

Population (2020)
  - Total: 6,082
- Time zone: UTC-5 (Eastern (EST))
  - Summer (DST): UTC-4 (EDT)
- ZIP Code: 06472
- Area codes: 203/475
- FIPS code: 09-54450
- GNIS feature ID: 2805986

Northford is a census-designated place (CDP) comprising the primary village and surrounding residential and rural land in the town of North Branford, New Haven County, Connecticut, United States. It is in the northern part of the town, bordered to the west by the town of North Haven, to the east by the town of Guilford, and to the north by the town of Wallingford, all in New Haven County. It is bordered to the northeast by the town of Durham in Middlesex County. In 2002, 230 acres (93 ha) of the central village of Northford were designated as the Northford Center Historic District.

== Demographics ==
=== 2020 census ===
Northford was first listed as a CDP prior to the 2020 census.

As of the 2020 census, Northford had a population of 6,082. The median age was 47.5 years. 18.9% of residents were under the age of 18 and 22.1% of residents were 65 years of age or older. For every 100 females there were 96.3 males, and for every 100 females age 18 and over there were 95.8 males age 18 and over.

94.3% of residents lived in urban areas, while 5.7% lived in rural areas.

There were 2,276 households in Northford, of which 29.6% had children under the age of 18 living in them. Of all households, 62.4% were married-couple households, 12.7% were households with a male householder and no spouse or partner present, and 19.2% were households with a female householder and no spouse or partner present. About 17.8% of all households were made up of individuals and 9.6% had someone living alone who was 65 years of age or older.

There were 2,362 housing units, of which 3.6% were vacant. The homeowner vacancy rate was 0.9% and the rental vacancy rate was 3.3%.

Racial composition as of the 2020 census
| Race | Number | Percent |
|---|---|---|
| White | 5,588 | 91.9% |
| Black or African American | 76 | 1.2% |
| American Indian and Alaska Native | 5 | 0.1% |
| Asian | 101 | 1.7% |
| Native Hawaiian and Other Pacific Islander | 0 | 0.0% |
| Some other race | 68 | 1.1% |
| Two or more races | 244 | 4.0% |
| Hispanic or Latino (of any race) | 254 | 4.2% |

== Religion ==
A Congregational church was organized at Northford in 1750 and its current building dates to 1846. St. Andrew's Episcopal Church was first organized in 1763. The present edifice was dedicated on November 10, 1940, having been rebuilt to resemble its predecessor, which dated to 1845 and was destroyed by fire in 1938. St. Monica's Roman Catholic Church was founded in the 1950s as a mission of St. Augustine's, North Branford. In 2016 it merged back into St. Augustine's to form a new entity: the parish of St. Ambrose, the first such merger in the Archdiocese of Hartford.
