= North Branford, Connecticut =

- Town
- Town of North Branford
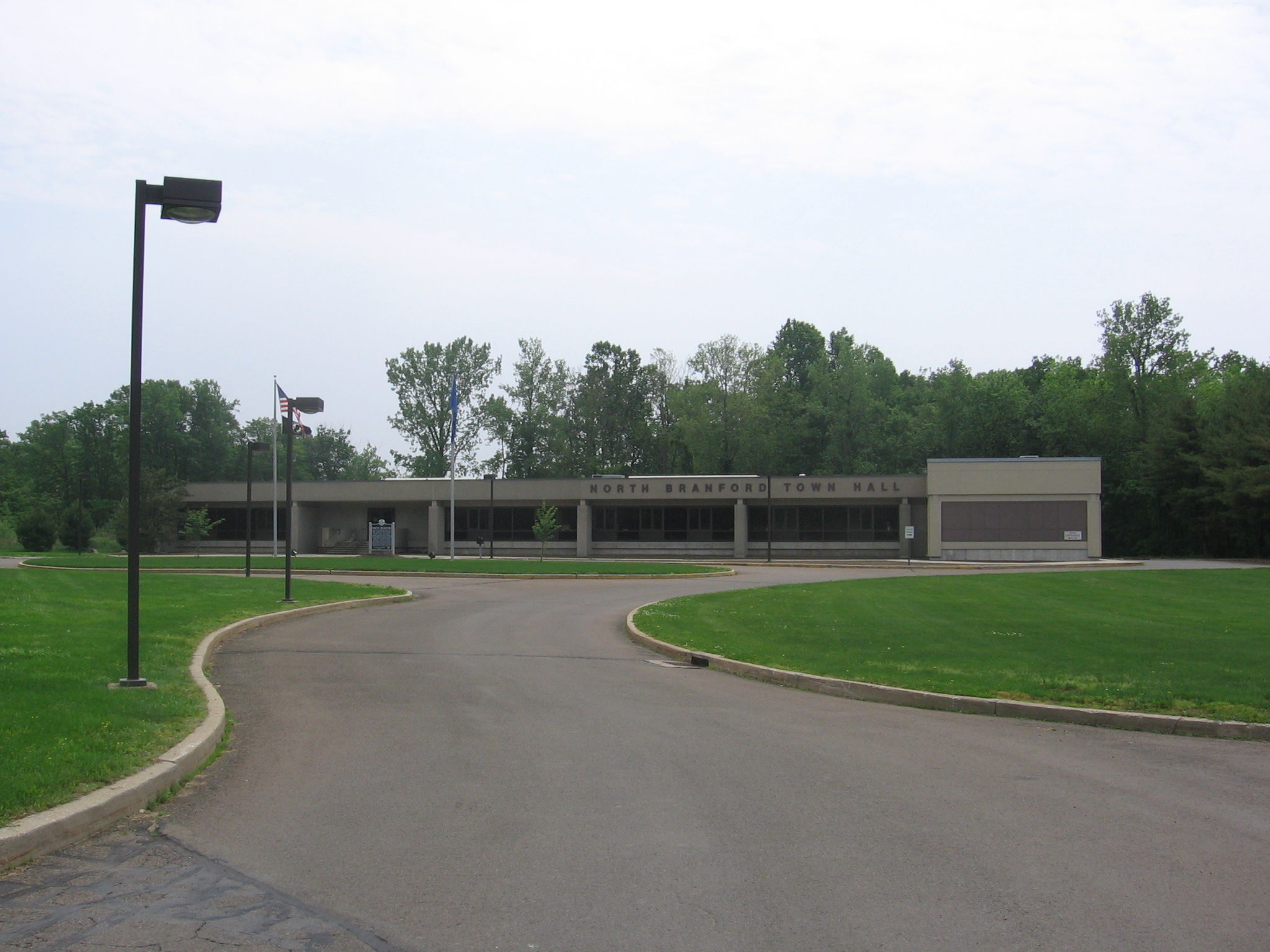
- North Branford Town Hall

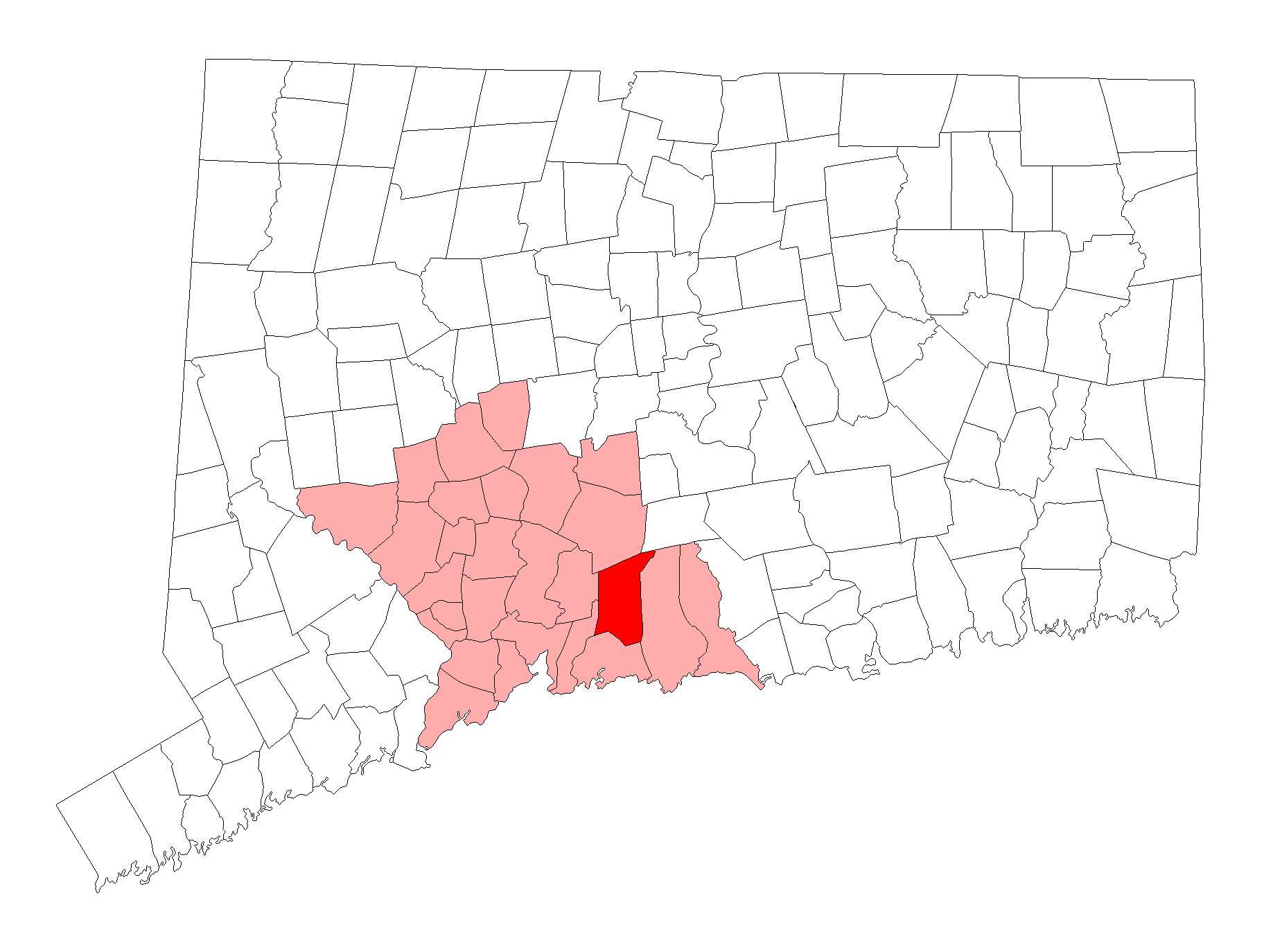
- Coordinates: 41°21′25″N 72°46′05″W
- Country: United States
- U.S. state: Connecticut
- County: New Haven
- Region: South Central CT
- Incorporated: 1831

Government
  - Type: Council-manager
  - Town Manager: Michael Downes
  - Town Council: Rose Marie Angeloni, Mayor; Jeffrey Macmillen, Deputy Mayor; Bruce Abelson; Marie Diamond; Craig C. Miller; Nick Palladino; Walter Goad; Ronald Pelliccia Jr. Thomas Zampano

Area
  - Total: 26.7 sq mi (69.2 km^{2})
  - Land: 24.9 sq mi (64.5 km^{2})
  - Water: 1.7 sq mi (4.5 km^{2})
- Elevation: 115 ft (35 m)

Population (2020)
  - Total: 13,544
  - Density: 544/sq mi (210/km^{2})
- Time zone: UTC-5 (Eastern)
  - Summer (DST): UTC-4 (Eastern)
- ZIP code: 06471, 06472
- Area codes: 203/475
- FIPS code: 09-53890
- GNIS feature ID: 0213477
- Website: www.northbranfordct.gov

North Branford is a town in New Haven County, Connecticut, United States. The town is part of the South Central Connecticut Planning Region. The population was 13,544 at the 2020 census. The town is primarily known for agriculture and for other points of interest including Lake Gaillard and Northford Ice Pavilion. Wallingford, Durham, and North Haven border it to the north, East Haven to the west, Guilford to the east, and Branford to the south.

The town has the neighborhoods of Totoket, Wood Chase, Sea Hill, Twin Lakes, Ashley Park, and Doral Farms. North Branford also includes the village of Northford.

== History ==
This early mill and farming community incorporated from Branford in 1831. The year prior, Maltby Fowler had opened a button-making shop. Its success along with the inventiveness of his six sons—who devised a range of machines to produce such things as screws, embossed silk, pins, and horseshoe nails—saw the rise of new manufactures along the town's Farm River. By the early 1900s, North Branford's abundant supply of trap rock, a material used for making roadways, made quarrying a growth industry. Today, the town's manufacturing sector is concentrated in electronics and electronic components.

== Geography ==
According to the United States Census Bureau, the town has a total area of 26.6 square miles (69.0 km^{2}), of which 24.9 square miles (64.5 km^{2}) is land and 1.7 square miles (4.5 km^{2}) (6.49%) is water. Neighboring towns are Wallingford and Durham to the north, Guilford to the east, Branford to the south, and North Haven and East Haven to the west.

Much of the town's acreage is dominated by Totoket Mountain, part of the Metacomet Ridge, a mountainous trap rock ridgeline that stretches from Long Island Sound almost to the Vermont border. The north side of Saltonstall Mountain is also located in North Branford. Totoket Mountain contains Lake Gaillard, a reservoir, formed in 1926, managed by the South Central Connecticut Regional Water Authority (SCCRWA). The SCCRWA maintains a network of hiking trails on Totoket Mountain in the Big Gulph area of Northford. The SCCRWA is said to own one-third of the town's area.

Totoket Mountain, 720 feet high, is the highest point of the town in the Northford neighborhood.

== Demographics ==
Historical population
Census	Pop.	Note	%±
1850	998		—
1860	1,050		5.2%
1870	1,035		−1.4%
1880	1,025		−1.0%
1890	825		−19.5%
1900	814		−1.3%
1910	833		2.3%
1920	1,110		33.3%
1930	1,329		19.7%
1940	1,438		8.2%
1950	2,017		40.3%
1960	6,771		235.7%
1970	10,778		59.2%
1980	11,554		7.2%
1990	12,996		12.5%
2000	13,906		7.0%
2010	14,407		3.6%
2020	13,544		−6.0%
U.S. Decennial Census

As of the census of 2000, there were 13,906 people (6,303 of which reside in the village of Northford), 5,132 households, and 3,869 families residing in the town. The population density was 558.0 inhabitants per square mile (215.4/km^{2}). There were 5,246 housing units at an average density of 210.5/sq. mi. (81.3/km^{2}). The racial makeup of the town was 96.50% White, Hispanic or Latino of any race were 1.80% of the population, 1.19% African American, 0.92% Asian, 0.84% from two or more races, 0.06% Native American, and 0.02% Pacific Islander.

There were 5,132 households, of which 35.4% had children under the age of 18 living with them, 64.2% were married couples living together, 8.0% had a female householder with no husband present, and 24.6% were nonfamilies. 20.5% of all households were made up of individuals, and 10.2% had someone living alone who was 65 years of age or older. The average household size was 2.70, and the average family size was 3.15.

In the town, the population was spread out, with 25.6% under the age of 18, 5.7% from 18 to 24, 29.5% from 25 to 44, 25.5% from 45 to 64, and 13.7% who were 65 years of age or older; the median age was 39 years. For every 100 females, there were 94.2 males; for every 100 females age 18 and over, there were 90.9 males.

The median income for a household in the town was $64,438, and the median income for a family was $71,813. Males had a median income of $46,852 versus $33,469 for females. The per capita income for the town was $28,542. About 1.2% of families and 1.6% of the population were below the poverty line, including 0.9% of those under age 18 and 3.7% of those age 65 or over.

The Totoket, an Algonkian-speaking native tribe, lived in the Branford and North Branford area.

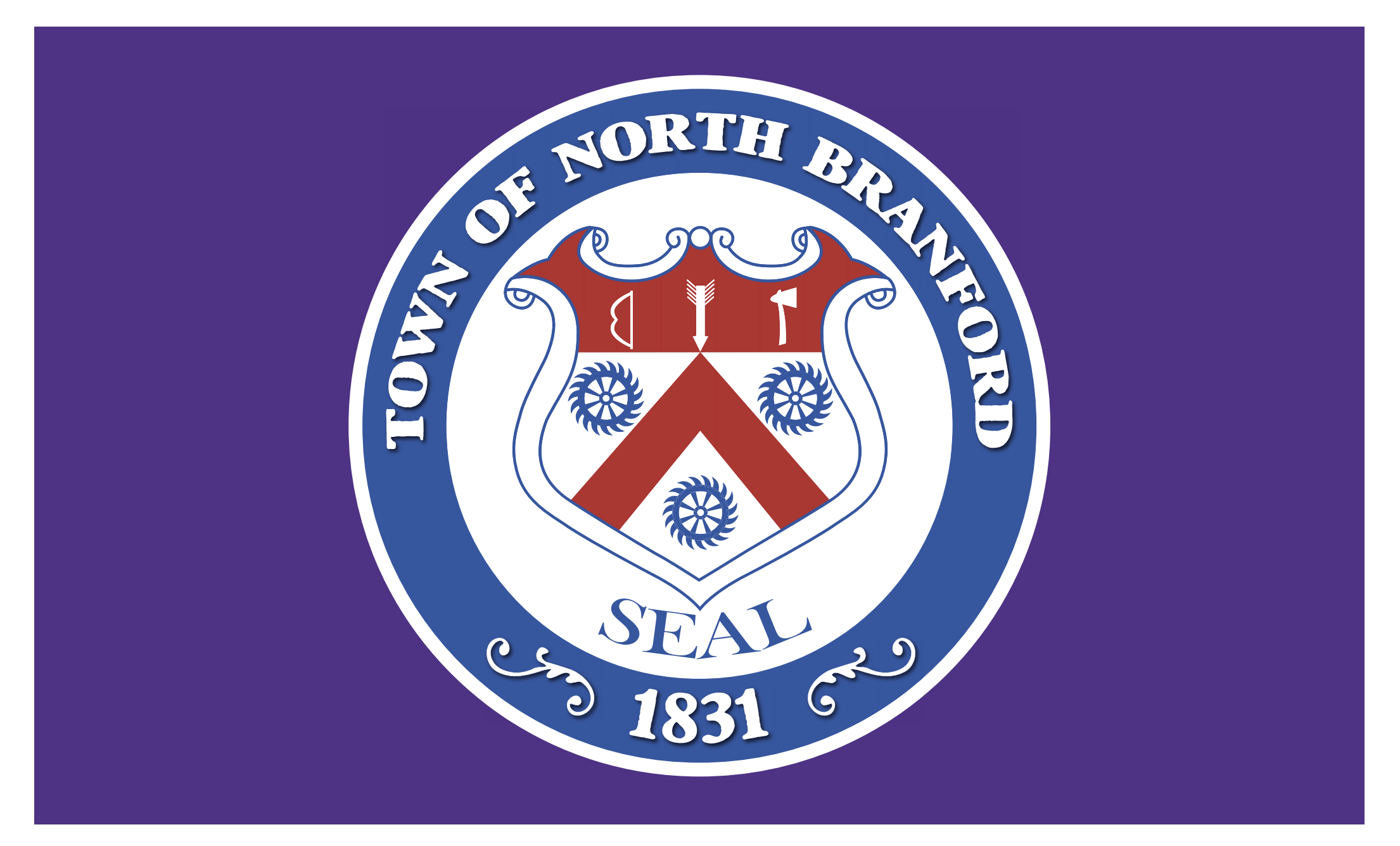
Official Flag of the Town of North Branford

== Education ==
The high school in town is North Branford High School; their athletic teams are known as the North Branford Thunderbirds. The middle school is North Branford Intermediate School; it has just recently undergone a new construction project which renovated an existing structure and added approximately 35,000 square feet (3,300 m^{2}) to the school. Their teams are known as the North Branford Thunderbirds. There are two elementary schools, Jerome Harrison (JHS) and Totoket Valley (TVES). In mid- 2010, the decision was made to rearrange grades and close the Stanley T. Williams elementary school in Northford.

== Historical preservation ==
Headquartered in town is the Totoket Historical Society, Inc. Founded in 1958 as the Northford Historical Institute, the society runs four historic buildings in town: the Reynolds Beers House (the main museum and office), the Miller Barn, the "Little White Gas Station", and the Little Red Schoolhouse. THS has a collection of local historical artifacts, many now being digitized. The Society's vast collection includes items such as historical photographs, business documents and ledgers, and documents relating to land transfer and the incorporation of the town, as well as many more assorted documents. In the Miller Barn is a collection of vintage farm equipment.

The Reynolds-Beers House is open regularly, and other Society buildings are opened to the public on predetermined dates or by appointment.

== Notable locations ==
- Branford Steam Railroad, a formerly steam-powered freight railroad in town, utilized by Tilcon for the transportation of its products to shoreline barges.
- Northford Ice Pavilion
- Lake Gaillard
- Northford Center Historic District added to the National Register of Historic Places in 2002

== Commerce ==
North Branford contains many commercial offices, such as Tilcon, Fire-Lite Alarms, and many more businesses located on major roads in North Branford and Northford.

== Notable people ==
- Charlotte Fowler Baldwin (1805–1873), American missionary in Hawaii
- Agnes G. Doody (1930–2023), professor of speech communication at University of Rhode Island
- Adam Erne (born 1995), NHL player for the Detroit Red Wings
- Leslie Hotson (1897–1992), literary scholar, died in North Branford
- Elizabeth Shannon Phillips (1911–1997) painter, muralist, died in North Branford
- Robert Ward (died 2021), longest-serving minority leader of the Connecticut House of Representatives
- Paul F. Zukunft (born 1955), Commandant of the United States Coast Guard
