= Connecticut Route 160 =

State highway in Hartford County, Connecticut, US

Route 160
- Map of Hartford County in northern Connecticut with Route 160 highlighted in red

Route information
- Maintained by CTDOT
- Length: 7.36 mi (11.84 km)
- Existed: 1932–present

Major junctions
- West end: US 5 / Route 15 / Berlin Turnpike in Berlin
- East end: Route 17 in Glastonbury

Location
- Country: United States
- State: Connecticut
- Counties: Hartford

Highway system
- Connecticut State Highway System; Interstate; US; State; SSR; SR; Scenic
← Route 159	→ Route 161

Route 160 is a state highway in Connecticut running for 7.36 miles (11.84 km) from the Berlin Turnpike (US 5/Route 15) in Berlin to Route 17 in the South Glastonbury section of Glastonbury. The road crosses the Connecticut River on the Rocky Hill–Glastonbury Ferry. It passes over Interstate 91 (I-91) in Rocky Hill with no interchange.

== Route description ==
Route 160 begins at an intersection with the Berlin Turnpike (US 5/Route 15) in northeastern Berlin and heads east into Rocky Hill. It briefly turns south, overlapping with Route 3 before resuming its eastward direction. It crosses over I-91 without an interchange, and crosses over Route 99. After passing through the center of town, it reaches the shore of the Connecticut River, and crosses it via the Rocky Hill–Glastonbury Ferry. In Glastonbury, it continues east to end at an intersection with Route 17 in South Glastonbury.

A 1.06-mile (1.71 km) section of Route 160 in Glastonbury, running from the Connecticut River to Roaring Brook, is designated a scenic road.

== History ==
The Rocky Hill-Glastonbury Ferry began service in 1655. In 1932, it was incorporated into the newly commissioned Route 160. Since then, Route 160 has had no major changes. In 1960, a request by the Town of Glastonbury to extend Route 160 east to the New London Turnpike, near Route 2, was declined by the state.

== Junction list ==
The entire route is in Hartford County.

Location	mi	km	Destinations	Notes
Berlin	0.00	0.00	US 5 / Route 15 (Berlin Turnpike) – Hartford, New Haven	Western terminus
Rocky Hill	3.21	5.17	Route 3 north – Wethersfield	Western end of Route 3 concurrency
Rocky Hill	3.40	5.47	Route 3 south – Cromwell	Eastern end of Route 3 concurrency
Rocky Hill	5.49	8.84	Route 99 – Cromwell, Wethersfield	Former Route 9
Connecticut River	6.09	9.80	Rocky Hill–Glastonbury Ferry	Open April 1–November 30
Glastonbury	7.36	11.84	Route 17 – Portland, Glastonbury	Eastern terminus
1.000 mi = 1.609 km; 1.000 km = 0.621 mi: Concurrency terminus
