= Gideon Welles House =

Historic house in Connecticut, United States

- U.S. National Register of Historic Places
- U.S. Historic district – Contributing property
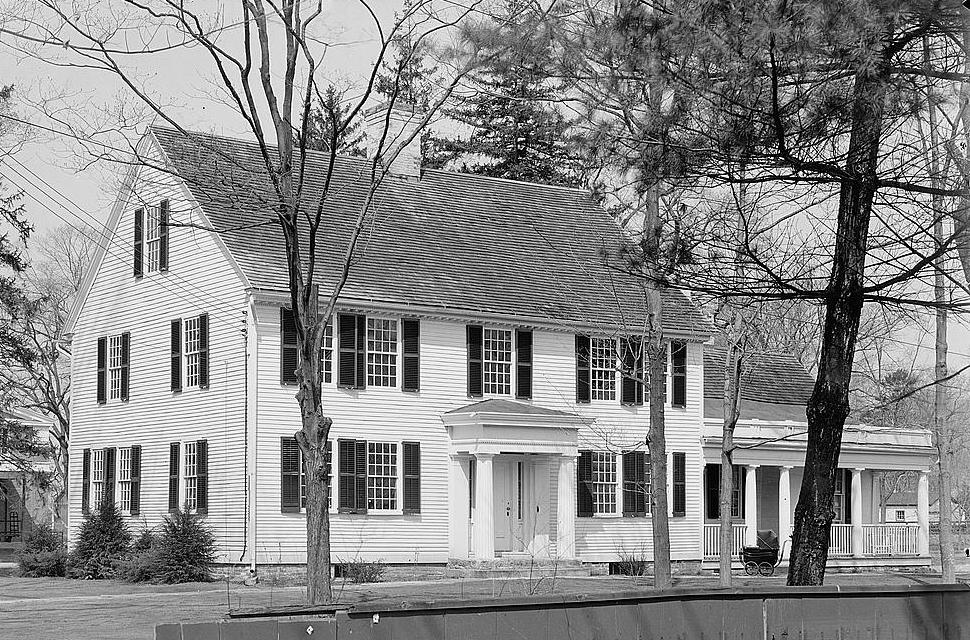
- 1937 HABS photo

- Location within Connecticut Location within the United States
- Location: 17 Hebron Avenue, Glastonbury, Connecticut
- Coordinates: 41°42′45″N 72°36′29″W
- Area: 1 acre (0.40 ha)
- Built: 1783
- Architectural style: Colonial
- Part of: Glastonbury Historic District (ID84001011)
- NRHP reference No.: 70000697

Significant dates
- Added to NRHP: October 6, 1970
- Designated CP: August 2, 1984

The Gideon Welles House is a historic house at 17 Hebron Avenue in Glastonbury, Connecticut. Built in 1783, it was home to generations of the locally prominent Welles family, whose most famous member was Gideon Welles, the United States Secretary of the Navy under Abraham Lincoln during the American Civil War. Now re-adapted to commercial uses, the house was listed on the National Register of Historic Places in 1970.

== Description and history ==
The Gideon Welles House stands in an area of dense commercial construction in northern Glastonbury, at the northeast corner of Main Street and Hebron Avenue. It is a 2 1/2-story wood-frame structure, with a side-gable roof, central chimney, and clapboarded exterior. Its front facade is five bays wide, with 12-over-12 sash windows placed symmetrically around and above the center entrance. The entrance is flanked by sidelight windows and pilasters, and is sheltered by a hip-roof porch with round columns. A single-story ell extends to the right side at a recess, with a porch across its front that is topped by low balustrade.

The house stands on land that was purchased by Thomas Welles of Wethersfield in 1655. This house was built in 1783 by Captain Samuel Welles for his son, also named Samuel. At the time, it was considered the grandest house in Glastonbury. Gideon Welles was born in this house in 1802, and rose to prominence in state politics, continuing the family's role in civic affairs. He became Secretary of the Navy in 1861, overseeing its growth during the Civil War and its role in the largely successful blockade of Confederate ports. The house remained in the Welles family until 1932. Threatened with demolition in 1935, a committee was formed to preserve it, which later became the Glastonbury Historical Society. The house was moved a short distance from its original location to its present one in 1936. Now owned by the town, it has been adaptively repurposed to house commercial businesses.

== See also ==
- National Register of Historic Places listings in Hartford County, Connecticut
