= Glastonbury Historic District =

Historic district in Connecticut, United States

- U.S. National Register of Historic Places
- U.S. Historic district
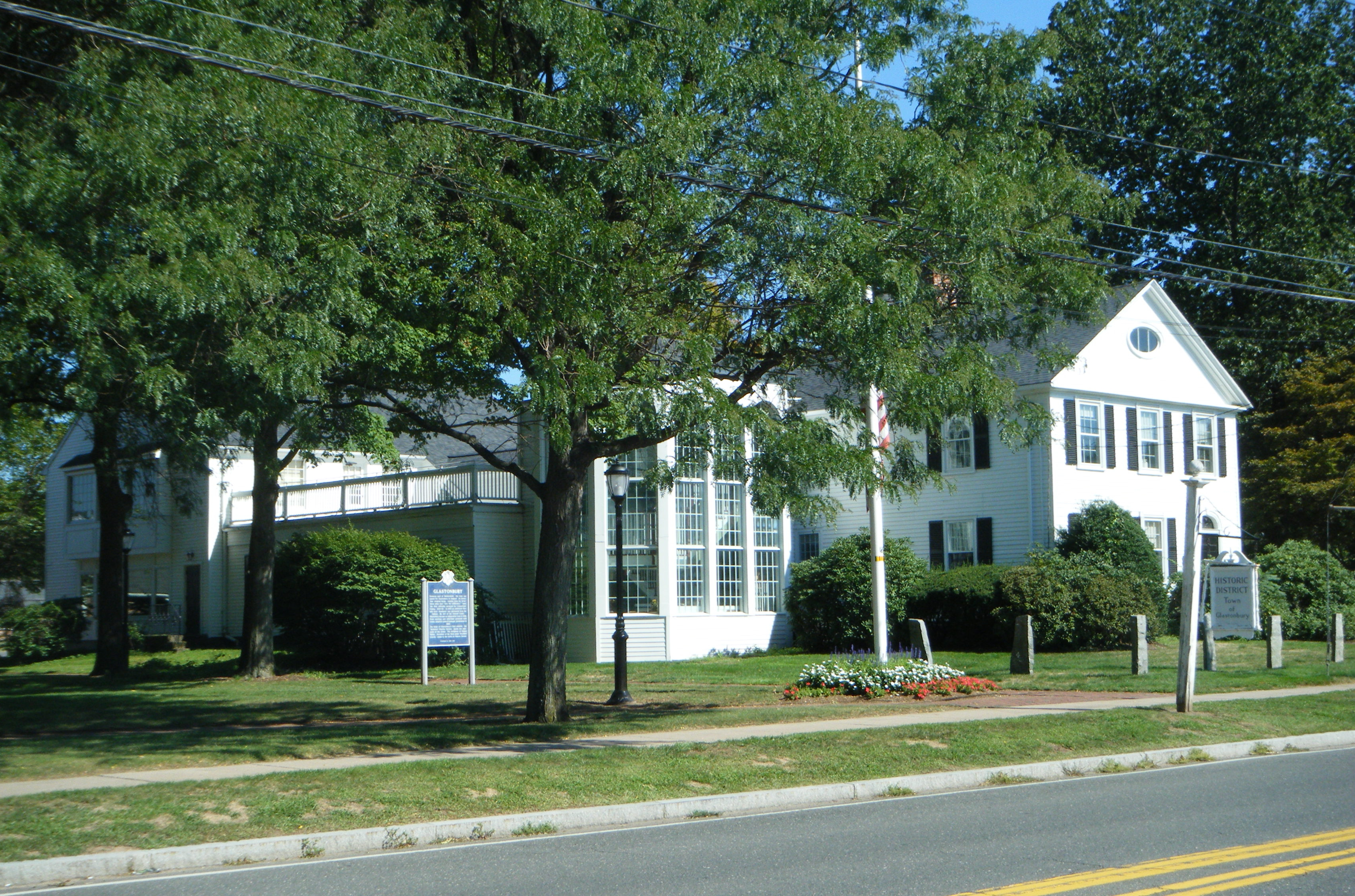

- Location within Connecticut Location within the United States
- Location: Roughly Main Street from Hebron Avenue to Talcott Road, Glastonbury, Connecticut
- Coordinates: 41°42′9″N 72°36′34″W
- Area: 128 acres (52 ha)
- Architectural style: Colonial, Greek Revival, Queen Anne
- NRHP reference No.: 84001011
- Added to NRHP: August 2, 1984

The Glastonbury Historic District encompasses a streetscape dating to the 17th century, along Main Street from Hebron Avenue to Talcott Road in Glastonbury, Connecticut. In addition to a significant number of 17th and 18th-century houses, it shows the architectural development of the town over time, with buildings spanning three centuries in construction dates. It was listed on the National Register of Historic Places in 1984.

== Description and history ==
Glastonbury's Main Street was originally a Native American trail roughly paralleling the Connecticut River, which flows southward to the west. The town was settled in the 17th century, and the town formally accepted the roadway late in that century. The basic route has been maintained, with a broad right-of-way including sidewalks separated from the road by grassy strips, and houses set well back from the roadway. Early land distribution practice was to allocate strips of land extending westward from the road to the river, which is still evident in some of the land ownership today. Near the center of the district is the town's original colonial center, including a small green, the 1840 former town hall (now the historical society museum), and early cemetery. The area's land use patterns were unaffected by 19th-century developments, since the town was bypassed by the railroads and never developed significant industry. It thus developed as a largely residential area, with housing in a diversity of styles, including Colonial, Greek Revival, and Queen Anne architecture amongst its 81 contributing buildings.

The historic district extends along Main Street from Hubbard Street in the north to Talcott Road in the south. There are 23 houses in the district which were built before 1800, one of the state's largest concentrations of such architecture. Most of these are wood frame construction, with the earliest typically having gambrel roofs and the later Georgian houses having gables. There are a few brick buildings, mostly of 19th century construction, including the former and present town halls. Prominent residents of the district include several members of the Welles family: Thomas Welles was an early colonial governor of Connecticut, and Gideon Welles was the United States Secretary of the Navy during the American Civil War.

== See also ==
- South Glastonbury Historic District, also NRHP-listed in Glastonbury
- Glastonbury-Rocky Hill Ferry Historic District, also NRHP-listed in Glastonbury
- National Register of Historic Places listings in Hartford County, Connecticut
