= Shipman House =

Shipman House may refer to:

in the United States

- Welles-Shipman-Ward House, South Glastonbury, Connecticut, listed on the NRHP in Hartford County, Connecticut
- W. H. Shipman House, Hilo, Hawaii, listed on the NRHP on the island of Hawaii
