= J. B. Williams Park =

Park in Connecticut, United States

Coordinates: 41.7034°N 72.5545°W

Named for James Baker Williams, founder of JB Williams Soap Company, J. B. Williams Park is located on Neipsic Road in Glastonbury, Connecticut, just off Route 2. It is a popular park for hiking, softball, fishing, ice-skating, and cross-country skiing.

== History ==
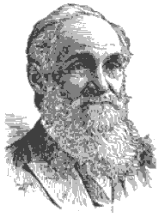
James Baker Williams (1818–1907)

James Baker Williams, born in 1818 in Lebanon, Connecticut, operated a soap factory at his general store in Manchester, Connecticut. In 1842 he moved his business to Glastonbury owning much land, including a mill on Williams Street and the land where the park is currently located. By the turn of the 20th century, JB Williams Soap Company was known worldwide for its shaving soap.

== Recreation ==
With the exception of a softball field, the entire 160 acres (0.65 km^{2}) of the park is wooded. The park's many trails are used by hikers, cross-country skiers, and the park is the home course for the Glastonbury High School cross-country team. The trails feature a wide .9 mile (1.4 km) loop. Near the entrance is a pond used for fishing and ice-skating, with a pavilion and playground nearby. Deeper into the park is the smaller "dog pond."

=== The Lost Ski Area ===
The town operated a small ski area at JB Williams up until the 1970s. A rope tow run by an old jeep brought skiers to the top of one main trail and several smaller woods trails. Now overgrown with a narrow hiking trail running up the main slope, one can still see the old rope tow.

== Gallery ==
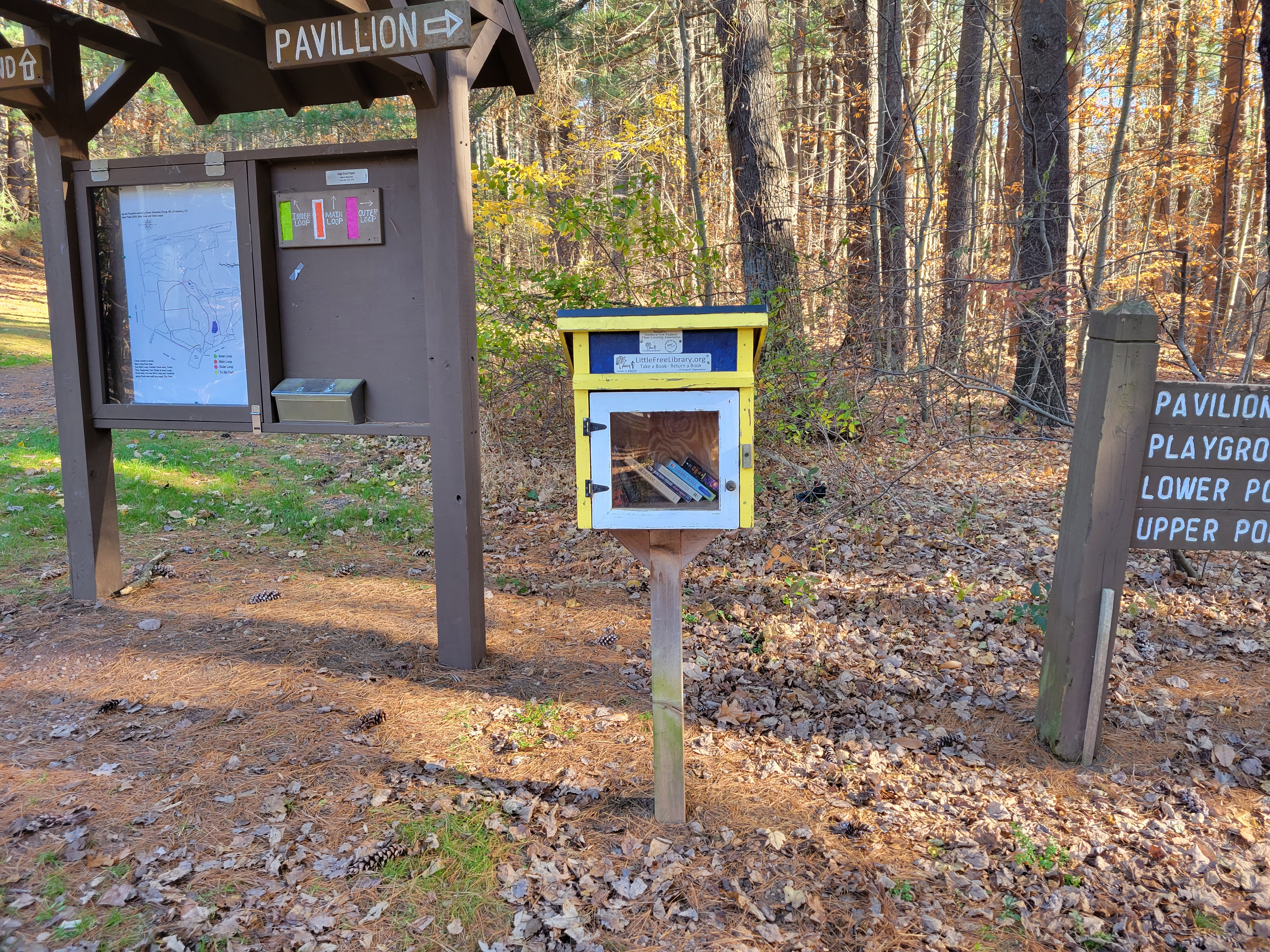
Little Free Library Box

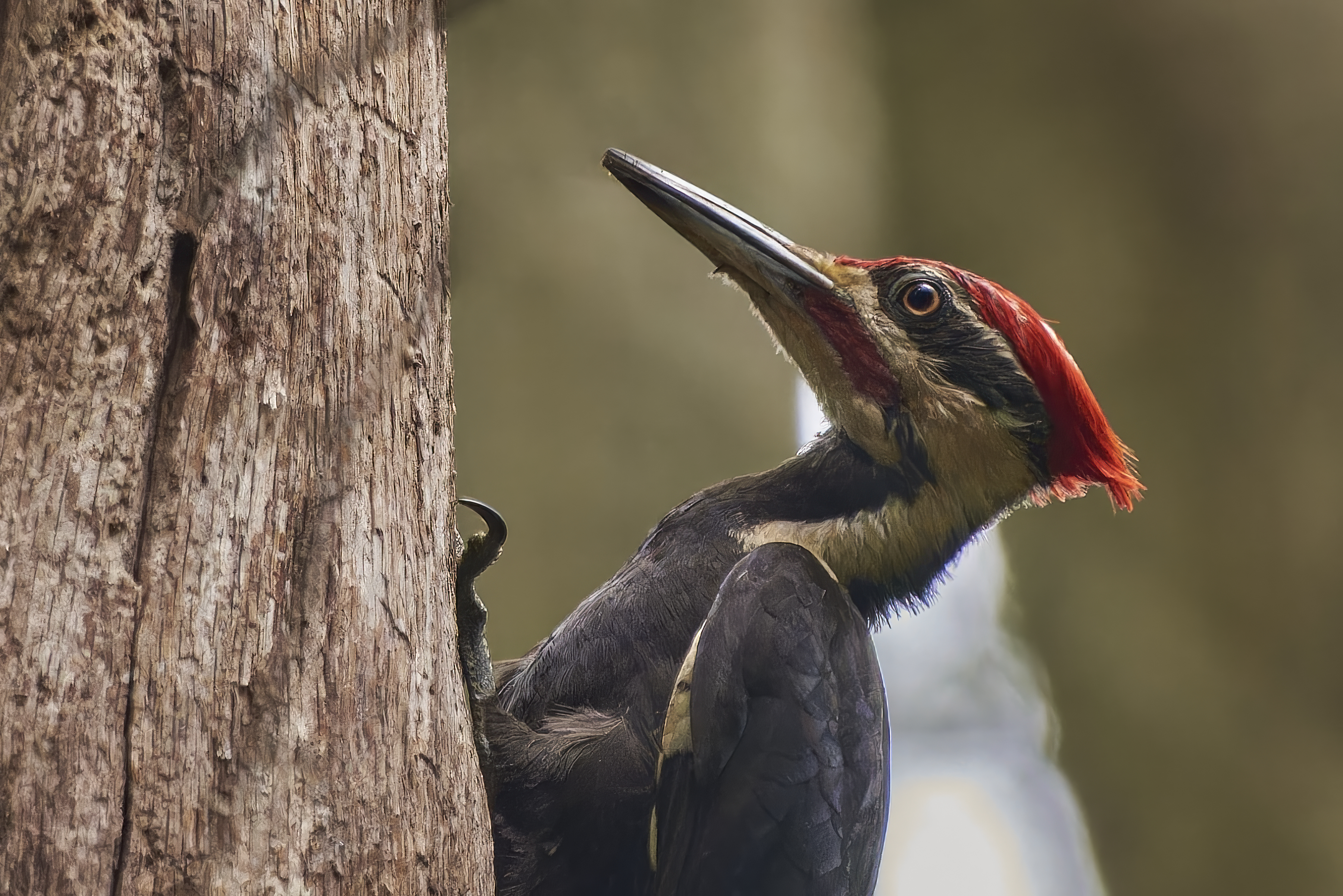
pileated woodpecker

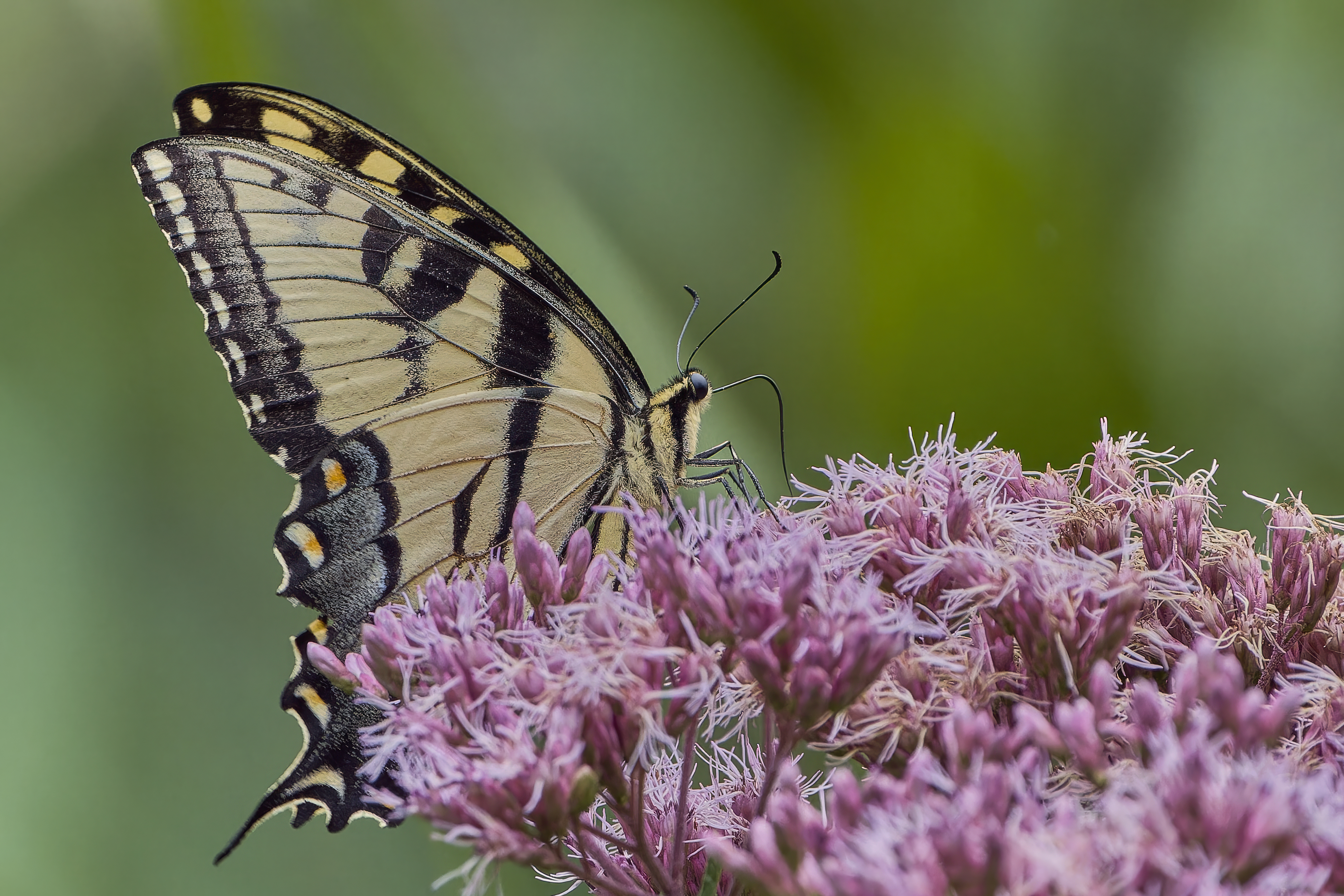
Eastern tiger swallowtail

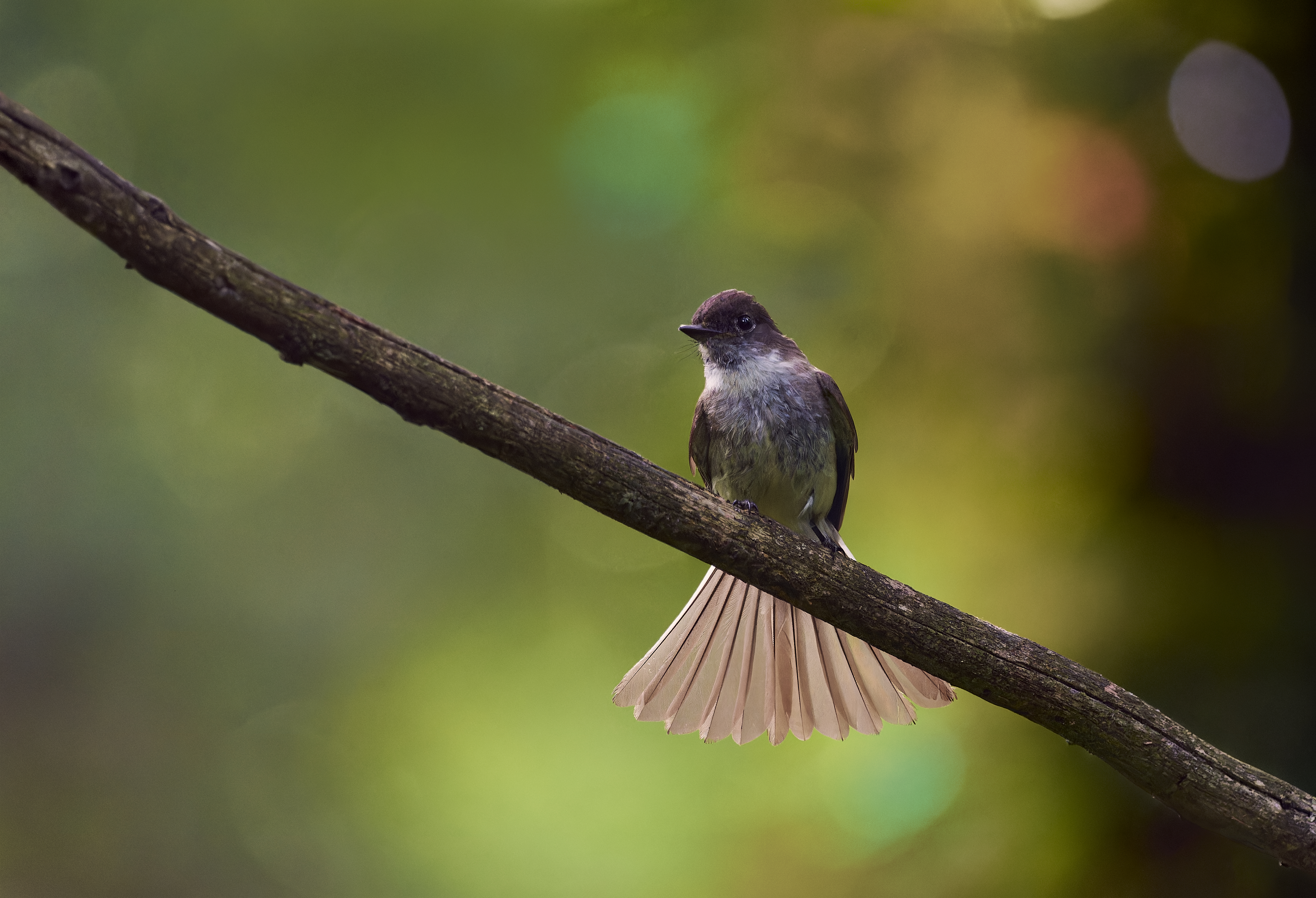
Eastern phoebe
