= Donald Cabral =

Donald Cabral may refer to:

- Donn Cabral (born 1989), American cross country and track runner
- Donald Reid Cabral (1923–2006), Dominican politician and lawyer
