= Connecticut Route 3 =

Highway in Connecticut

Route 3

Route information
- Maintained by CTDOT
- Length: 14.45 mi (23.26 km)
- Existed: 1941 (extended 1991)–present

Major junctions
- South end: Route 66 in Middletown
- Route 372 in Cromwell; I-91 in Wethersfield
- North end: Route 2 in Glastonbury

Location
- Country: United States
- State: Connecticut
- Counties: Middlesex, Hartford

Highway system
- Connecticut State Highway System; Interstate; US; State; SSR; SR; Scenic
← Route 2A	→ Route 4
← I-484	→ I-684

Route 3 is a 14.45-mile-long (23.26 km) route connecting Middletown to Glastonbury. It passes through the towns of Cromwell, Rocky Hill, and Wethersfield. The northernmost 3 miles (4.8 km) of Route 3 is a freeway that was originally intended for the cancelled Interstate 491.

== Route description ==
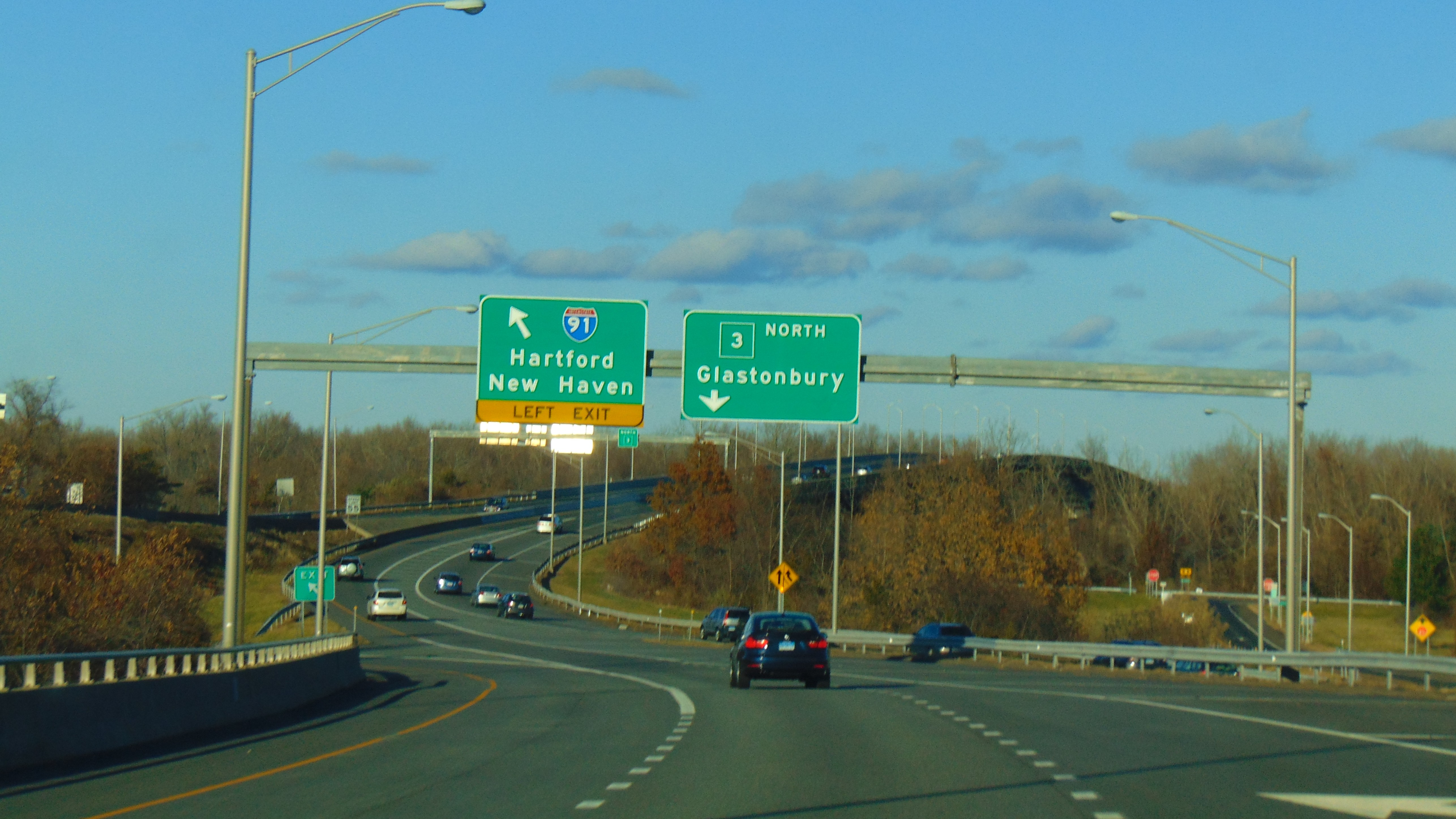
CT 3 at I-91 in Wethersfield.

Route 3 begins at Route 66 in Middletown, and is a surface road for its first 11 miles (18 km) up to Wethersfield. After crossing into Cromwell, it intersects Route 372, which offers access to Route 9 just east of the intersection. After overpassing Route 9, it continues north into Rocky Hill and overpasses Interstate 91 without an interchange. After a brief concurrency with Route 160, it crosses into Wethersfield, where it meets the eastern end of Route 287 and crosses over Route 99. After the Silas Deane Highway (Route 99) intersection, it becomes a four-lane undivided expressway. At an interchange with Interstate 91, it becomes a four-lane divided freeway crosses the Connecticut River on the William H. Putnam Memorial Bridge into Glastonbury. The freeway has one exit for Main Street (via Glastonbury Boulevard northbound and Putnam Boulevard southbound) before ending at a trumpet interchange with the Route 2 expressway at the East Hartford town line.

== History ==
=== 1941 ===
Route 3 was established in 1941. It originally ran from West Street/Berlin Road in Cromwell, which was part of Route 72 at the time (now Route 372), to the Silas Deane Highway (Route 99) in Wethersfield.

=== 1958–1973 (I-491) ===
Interstate 491
- Location: Hartford, Connecticut
- Existed: 1958–1973

In late 1958, as part of the planned Interstate 491 (a southeastern bypass of Hartford), a freeway from I-91 to Main Street in Glastonbury, crossing the Connecticut River on the Putnam Memorial Bridge, was opened. The Route 3 designation was temporarily extended along this freeway pending completion of I-491. In 1973, I-491 was cancelled due to local opposition and the Route 3 designation along this freeway segment became permanent. In the late 1980s, the freeway was extended so that it terminated at Route 2, rather than at Main Street.

=== 1991 ===
In 1991, when the Route 9 freeway through Berlin and New Britain was completed, Route 72 was truncated to end at Route 9 in New Britain. The east–west portion of the old alignment of Route 72 was reassigned to an extended Route 372 (running along Berlin Road/West Street to end at Route 99 in Cromwell). The north–south portion of old Route 72 from Cromwell to Middletown (ending at Route 66) was reassigned to Route 3.

== Junction list ==
Exits were given mile-based numbers in 2025 as part of a sign replacement project.

County	Location	mi	km	Exit	Destinations	Notes
Middlesex	Middletown	0.00	0.00		Route 66 – Middletown, Portland, Meriden	Southern terminus
Middlesex	Cromwell	3.05	4.91		To Route 372 west – Berlin, New Britain	Access via SR 524
Middlesex	Cromwell	3.37	5.42		Route 372 to I-91 / Route 9 – Middletown, Cromwell, Hartford, Berlin, New Britain	
Hartford	Rocky Hill	6.59	10.61		To I-91 – Hartford, New Haven, Dinosaur State Park	Access via SSR 411
Hartford	Rocky Hill	7.21	11.60		Route 160 east – Rocky Hill	Southern end of Route 160 concurrency
Hartford	Rocky Hill	7.40	11.91		Route 160 west – Berlin	Northern end of Route 160 concurrency
Hartford	Wethersfield	10.21	16.43		Route 287 west – Newington	Eastern terminus of Route 287
Hartford	Wethersfield	10.37	16.69		Route 99 – Hartford, Rocky Hill	Former Route 9
Hartford	Wethersfield	10.55	16.98	Southern end of limited-access section		
Hartford	Wethersfield	11.31	18.20	11	I-91 – Hartford, New Haven	Signed as exits 11A (I-91 south) and 11B (I-91 north) southbound; exits 33A and 33B on I-91
Hartford	Connecticut River	11.63– 12.09	18.72– 19.46	Putnam Bridge		
Hartford	Glastonbury	12.96	20.86	13A	To Main Street – Glastonbury	Northbound exit and entrance; access via Glastonbury Boulevard
Hartford	Glastonbury	13.26	21.34	13	To Main Street – Glastonbury	Southbound exit and entrance; access via Putnam Boulevard
Hartford	Glastonbury	14.45	23.26	13	Route 2 – Hartford, Norwich	Eastern terminus; signed as exits 13B (Route 2 west) and 13C (Route 2 east); exit 4A on Route 2
1.000 mi = 1.609 km; 1.000 km = 0.621 mi: Concurrency terminus; Incomplete access
