= Glastonbury–Rocky Hill Ferry Historic District =

Historic district in Connecticut, United States

- Glastonbury-Rock Hill Ferry Historic District
- U.S. National Register of Historic Places
- U.S. Historic district
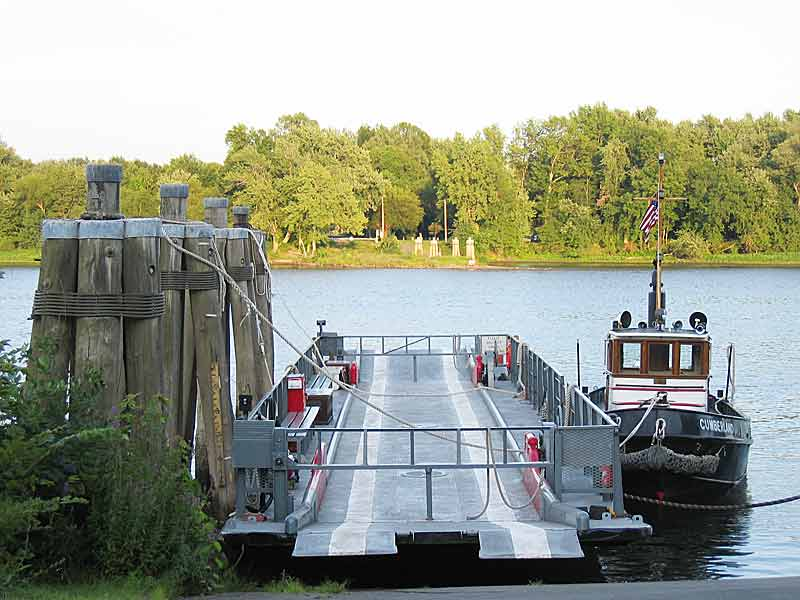

- Location within Connecticut Location within the United States
- Location: Roughly along Tryon Street, Ferry Lane and Glastonbury Avenue, Meadow and Riverview Roads, Glastonbury, Connecticut
- Coordinates: 41°39′46″N 72°37′19″W
- Area: 230 acres (93 ha)
- Architect: multiple
- Architectural style: Colonial, Federal, et al.
- NRHP reference No.: 05001046
- Added to NRHP: September 21, 2005

The Glastonbury–Rocky Hill Ferry Historic District is a historic district in Glastonbury and Rocky Hill, Connecticut, encompassing a landscape with more than 300 years of colonial and post-colonial history. It includes the ferry landings and water traversed by the Rocky Hill – Glastonbury Ferry, one of the longest-running ferry services the nation, and the surrounding farmscapes and ferry landing village. The district was listed on the National Register of Historic Places in 2005.

== History ==
The towns of Rocky Hill and Glastonbury were originally settled in the mid-17th century as part of Wethersfield, from which they were separated in 1843 and 1693 respectively. Although they followed somewhat different paths of development, the ferry, established in 1655, has been a continuing presence joining the landing areas on either side of the Connecticut River.

The area of South Glastonbury that surrounds the eastern ferry landing has a long history of agricultural use. The broad meadows in the Connecticut River flood plain were used agriculturally by Native American prior to the arrival of English colonists, and were surveyed and subdivided by Wethersfield residents in the 1640s. Houses were built just above the flood plain on what is now Tryon Street. The oldest house in the district, the c. 1700 Thomas Treat house, is located on Tryon Street, as are several other early 18th-century houses. Later development in the 18th and 19th centuries added farm buildings and ferry-related infrastructure to the Glastonbury side of the district. Landowners in this area retained and maintained family and business connections with those across the river.

Rocky Hill remained part of Wethersfield much longer, and the Rocky Hill Landing area became its principal port area after a major flood in 1700 wiped out Wethersfield's old port area. The landscape on the west side of the river is characterized by a narrow flood plain, most of which was held in common by the town and has never been significantly developed. A steep bluff separates the landing itself from the main town economic center, and shaped its development in the 18th and early 19th century as a port and shipbuilding center. The Connecticut Valley Railroad was built through the landing area in 1871, providing transport to market for goods produced in South Glastonbury.

== See also ==
- Gales Ferry, also NRHP-listed in CT
- Hadlyme Ferry Historic District, also NRHP-listed in CT
- National Register of Historic Places listings in Hartford County, Connecticut
