= J. B. Williams Co. Historic District =

Historic district in Connecticut, United States

- U.S. National Register of Historic Places
- U.S. Historic district
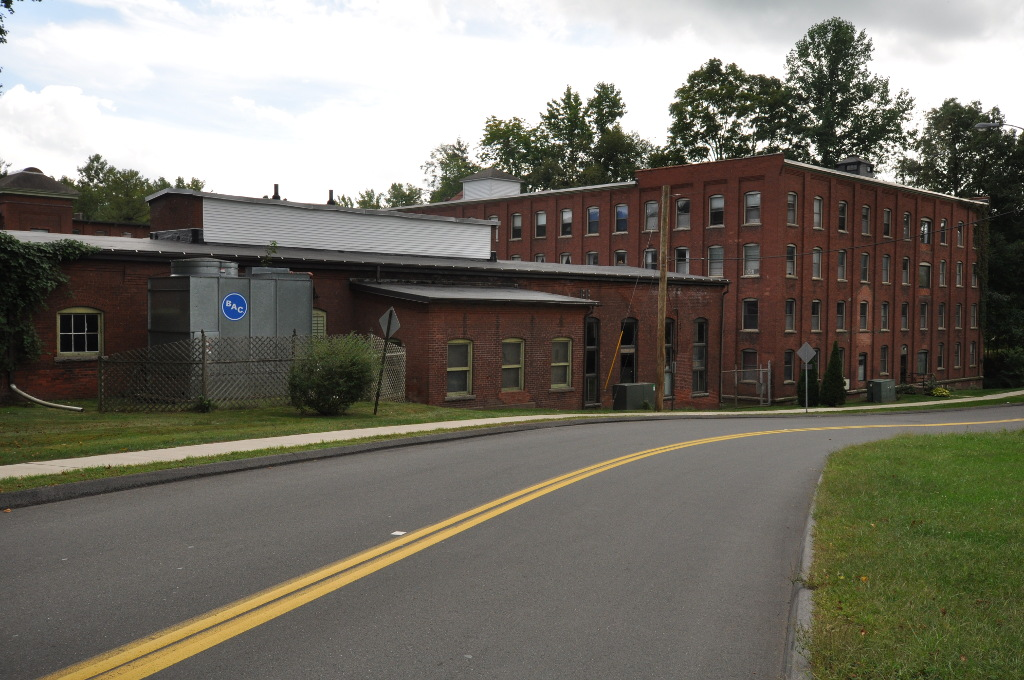

- Location within Connecticut Location within the United States
- Location: Hubbard, Williams, and Willieb Streets, Glastonbury, Connecticut
- Coordinates: 41°42′8″N 72°35′49″W
- Area: 75 acres (30 ha)
- Architectural style: Greek Revival, Late Victorian, Colonial Revival
- NRHP reference No.: 83001268
- Added to NRHP: April 7, 1983

The J. B. Williams Co. Historic District encompasses a historic 19th-century factory complex and related family housing in Glastonbury, Connecticut. Located on and around Hubbard, Williams, and Willieb Streets, the area includes a mid-19th century frame factory as well as later brick buildings, and houses belonging to its owners, members of the Williams family. The soap factory operated by the Williamses was one of the otherwise agrarian town's largest economic forces until its mid-20th century decline. The district was listed on the National Register of Historic Places in 1983.

== Description and history ==
James B. Williams, a native of Lebanon, Connecticut, came to Manchester in 1834, where he began experimenting with soap formulations while working at a general store. In 1840 he established a small shop for soap production there, which met with success. In 1849 he moved to Glastonbury, where he acquired the site of a former gristmill owned by his first father-in-law, Jerusha Hubbard. The industrial complex on the south side of Williams Street is where this business developed, eventually growing to include buildings on the north side of the street. The business peaked in the 1920s, employing about 300 workers, and was Glastonbury's largest single employer. It was sold out of the family in 1957, with the facilities used by their successors until 1977. The surviving factory buildings (which include four brick buildings and a rare wood-frame building from the mid-19th century), have been converted into residences.

In 1859 J.B. Williams built an elaborate brick Italianate mansion on Willieb Street, set on a hill overlooking the factory. His son David built a Queen Anne/Shingle style house in 1892 on Williams Street, and another son, Samuel, built a fine Georgian mansion on Hubbard Street. The oldest building in the district is a much-altered c. 1740 house known informally as "Grandfather's House", as it was where Jerusha Hubbard lived at the time of the Williams purchase.

== See also ==
- National Register of Historic Places listings in Hartford County, Connecticut
