= William H. Putnam Memorial Bridge =

Putnam Bridge
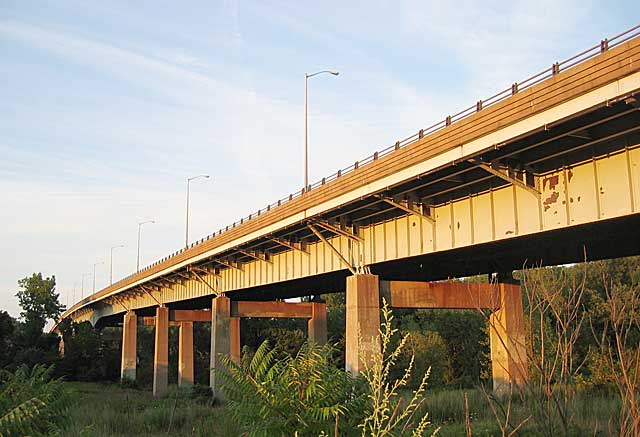
- Western end of the William H. Putnam Memorial Bridge, before rehabilitation.
- Coordinates: 41°42′51″N 72°38′27″W
- Carries: 4 lanes of Route 3
- Crosses: Connecticut River
- Locale: Wethersfield, Connecticut and Glastonbury, Connecticut
- Official name: William H. Putnam Memorial Bridge

Characteristics
- Design: Steel girder bridge
- Clearance below: 80 ft (24.3 m)

Statistics
- Daily traffic: 50,800

The Putnam Bridge is a bridge in the state of Connecticut carrying the Route 3 freeway over the Connecticut River, connecting Interstate 91 in Wethersfield and Route 2 in Glastonbury. It is the southernmost crossing of the Connecticut River in the Hartford Area and carries an average of 50,800 vehicles per day.

The bridge was built in the late 1950s as part of the Route 3 freeway between Interstate 91 and Route 2. It originally terminated at Main Street in Glastonbury, rather than at Route 2. It was expected to be expanded to a double-decker in the early 1970s as part of the planned Interstate 491, a southeastern bypass around Hartford from Wethersfield to East Hartford. However, the project was cancelled in 1973. In the late 1980s, the freeway portion of Route 3 was extended to terminate at Route 2.

In 2013, the bridge underwent a $15 million rehabilitation project, which repaved the roadbed, repainted the girders, added new lighting fixtures and a new pedestrian walkway.

== See also ==
- List of crossings of the Connecticut River
