= Donn Cabral =

American steeplechase runner (born 1989)

Donald Cabral
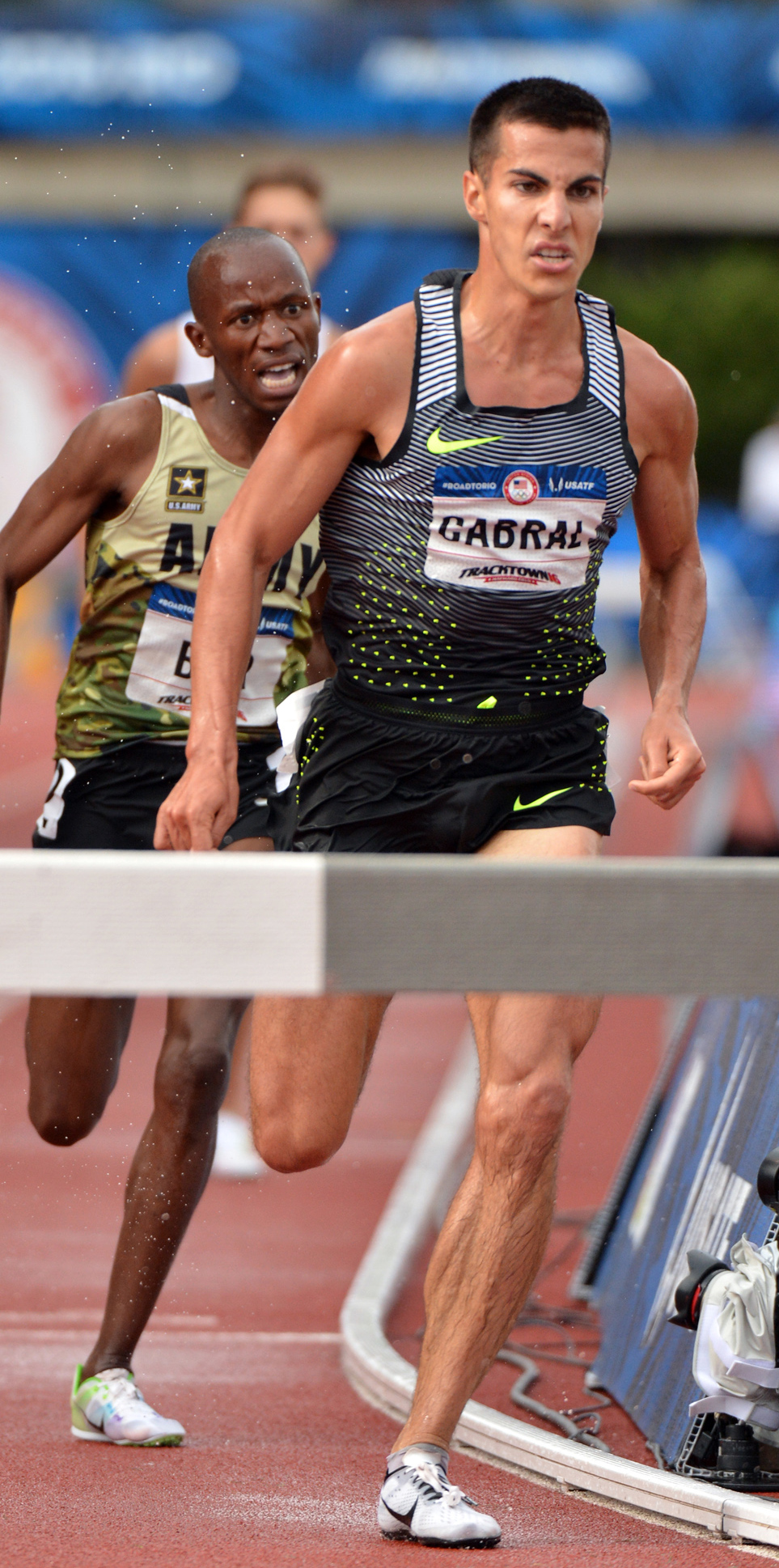
- Cabral (right) racing steeplechase at the 2016 Olympic Trials

Personal information
- Nationality: American
- Born: December 12, 1989 (age 36) Glastonbury, Connecticut, U.S.
- Height: 178 cm (5 ft 10 in)
- Weight: 68 kg (150 lb)

Sport
- Sport: Track
- Events: 1500 meters, Mile, Steeplechase
- College team: Princeton

Achievements and titles
- Personal bests: 1500 meters: 3:40.03; 3000-m steeple: 8:19.14; 5000 meters: 13:22.19
Medal record
Men's athletics
Representing the United States
NACAC Under-23 Championships
Gold medal – first place	2010 Miramar	Steeplechase
USA Outdoor Championships
Silver medal – second place	2012 Eugene	3000m steeplechase
Bronze medal – third place	2014 Sacramento	3000m steeplechase
Bronze medal – third place	2016 Eugene	3000m steeplechase
Representing Princeton Tigers/Ivy League
NCAA Outdoor Championships
Silver medal – second place	2010 Eugene	3000m steeplechase
Silver medal – second place	2011 Des Moines	3000m steeplechase
Gold medal – first place	2012 Des Moines	3000m steeplechase
By race: Event / 1st / 2nd / 3rd; NCAA 3000m steeplechase / 1 / 2 / 0
Event / 1st / 2nd / 3rd; NCAA Outdoor Championships / 1 / 2 / 0
- Updated on 11–26–14

Donald Cabral (born December 12, 1989) is an American cross country and track runner from Connecticut who went on to star at Princeton University. He has been most successful in the steeplechase, but has also been a National Collegiate Athletic Association (NCAA) All-American in cross country and the 5000 meters, as well as the Ivy League champion at the 3000 meters. He is a former American collegiate steeplechase record holder and was the 2012 NCAA steeplechase champion. He competed in the 2012 Summer Olympics and 2016 Summer Olympics in the steeplechase. At Princeton, Cabral was an eight-time NCAA All-American and ten-time individual Ivy League champion. He was a long distance running champion in high school for Glastonbury High School, winning two Class LL championships as a sophomore and then open state and New England championships as a junior and senior.

== Running career ==
=== High school ===
Early on, Cabral showed interest in Olympic competition and high caliber racing. After watching patriotic flag waving during the 1996 Summer Olympics, Cabral requested that his father wave the American Flag during one of his swim meets as a six-year-old. In his first Manchester Road Race at age 12, Cabral's parents placed him in the starting position with the runners who run at an 8–9 minute per mile pace, but he complained, "How am I going to win from back here?"

At Glastonbury High School in Glastonbury, Connecticut, Cabral excelled in track and cross country. He was a two-time State Open and New England cross country champion. He was also the indoor track Connecticut 2 mile champion. He ran the fastest high school 1500 meters in the country during his senior year. He also established state records in the 5,000 m (14:32.60) and the 2 mile run (8:56.35).

As a freshman, Cabral was the second slowest runner on the soccer team. He tried out for track to work on his speed. At first he ran the 400 meters in 68 seconds. By the end of the spring, he broke 10 minutes in the 2 mile and was considering joining the cross country team instead of participating in his usual fall sport, soccer. In the summer of 2005, the cross country coach sent him a letter of encouragement.

During his sophomore year, he won the boys Connecticut Interscholastic Athletic Conference (CIAC) class LL indoor track 3200 meters race and placed third in the New England Championships two mile race. He finished third in the CIAC Cross Country Open Championships and 19th in the New England Championships. His cross country performance earned him the Class LL championship that year.

As a junior, Cabral won the CIAC Cross Country Open Championships. He also won the 72nd New England Cross Country Championships at Ponaganset High School with a 5K race time of 15:29. Glastonbury finished second to Danbury High School in the team competition. At the Foot Locker National Cross Country Championship, Cabral finished 21st with a time of 15:57.

In his senior season, Cabral won the 2007 boys CIAC State Open Cross Country Championships. He also won the New England Cross Country Championships. At the Foot Locker National Cross Country Championship at Balboa Park in San Diego, Cabral finished 8th with a time of 15:19, which tied the best ever finish by a Connecticut runner. In May, his 4:09.80 became the best mile time of the school year for an American high schooler. Cabral placed second in the 10,000 meters (30:50.28) at the 2008 USA Junior Track & Field championships, qualifying him for the at the IAAF World Junior Championships in Poland.

=== Collegiate ===
During his Princeton running career, Cabral was a three-time NCAA All-America in the steeplechase, two-time outdoor NCAA All-America in the 5000 meter, two-time cross country NCAA All-America, and one-time indoor NCAA All-America in the 5000 meter. As a senior, Cabral became the 2012 NCAA champion in the steeplechase after having been the runner-up to Matt Hughes in the two prior NCAA steeplechase championships.

As a freshman, Cabral endured a plantar fascia tear while waterskiing and did not compete in cross country. He did not compete in the steeplechase until his sophomore season at Princeton. In his second time running the event, he won at the 2010 Penn Relays. That year he was the Ivy League outdoor 10,000 meter and steeplechase champion and the indoor runner-up in the 3000 meters and 5000 meters. He finished second at the NCAA championships with a time of 8:38.90.

As a junior in 2010–11, he placed 34th at the November 22, 2010 NCAA Men's Cross Country Championship, earning All-American recognition for his top-40 finish. Then, he repeated as the Ivy League outdoor 10,000 meter and steeplechase champion and became the indoor champion in the 3000 meters and 5000 meters. He was selected as the most outstanding performer at both the indoor and outdoor Heps meets. That fall, he had been the 2010 Ivy League cross country champion. He finished second at the NCAA championships with a time of 8:32.14. At the NCAA national outdoor 5,000 meter race, he established a school record of 13:40.62 that would stand for less than a year.

He spent the summer of 2011 training in Park City, Utah. During his senior season, Cabral purchased a high-altitude tent on craigslist that he used in his dormitory room for five months leading up to the 2012 Olympic Trials. This enabled him to sleep and study at a simulated altitude of 12,000 feet (3,700 m) with the goal of making his body more efficient by depriving himself of oxygen. He spent 10–12 hours per day in the tent. At the November 21, 2011, NCAA Men's Cross Country Championship, he placed 19th, again earning All-American status. In 2012, he won his third consecutive Ivy League outdoor 10,000 meter and steeplechase championships. He also repeated as the indoor champion in the 5000 meters. He won at the NCAA championships with a time of 8:35.44.

On May 18, 2012, while running in the OXY High Performance meet in California, Cabral completed the 3000 m steeplechase in 8:19.14, surpassing Farley Gerber's American Collegiate record of 8:19.27, set for Weber State University in 1984 and smashing his own personal best time of 8:32. The previous Ivy League record of 8:29.01 had been set by Michael Fadil of Dartmouth College in 1985. Cabral also holds the Ivy League record for the indoor 5000 meters.

Cabral became the 2012 NCAA steeplechase champion on June 8, 2012, winning by five seconds and capping an undefeated season in the event. Cabral is Princeton's first individual track event NCAA champion since William Bonthron's 1934 championship in the mile run in 1934. This does excludes field event champions such as Tora Harris (2002 high jump) who had been Princeton's last NCAA Outdoor Track and Field champion. When combined with the men's squash team and epeeist Jonathan Yergler, it marked the first academic year that Princeton had three national champions since 2003. Harris had also been the last track and field Olympian, although no Princeton distance runner had qualified for the Olympics since class of 1906 Princetonian John Eisele earned a silver medal in the steeplechase and a bronze medal in the three-mile at the 1908 Summer Olympics. No Princeton runner had made the Olympics since Bill Stevenson went to the 1924 Summer Olympics.

Because athletes in Ivy League competition only have four years of athletic eligibility, Cabral could not participate in NCAA competition for Princeton to use his final year of cross country eligibility. As a result, he intended to enroll in business school at the University of Colorado, where he would continue training with Billy Nelson coach Mark Wetmore. He opted to turn pro rather than attend Colorado.

=== International ===
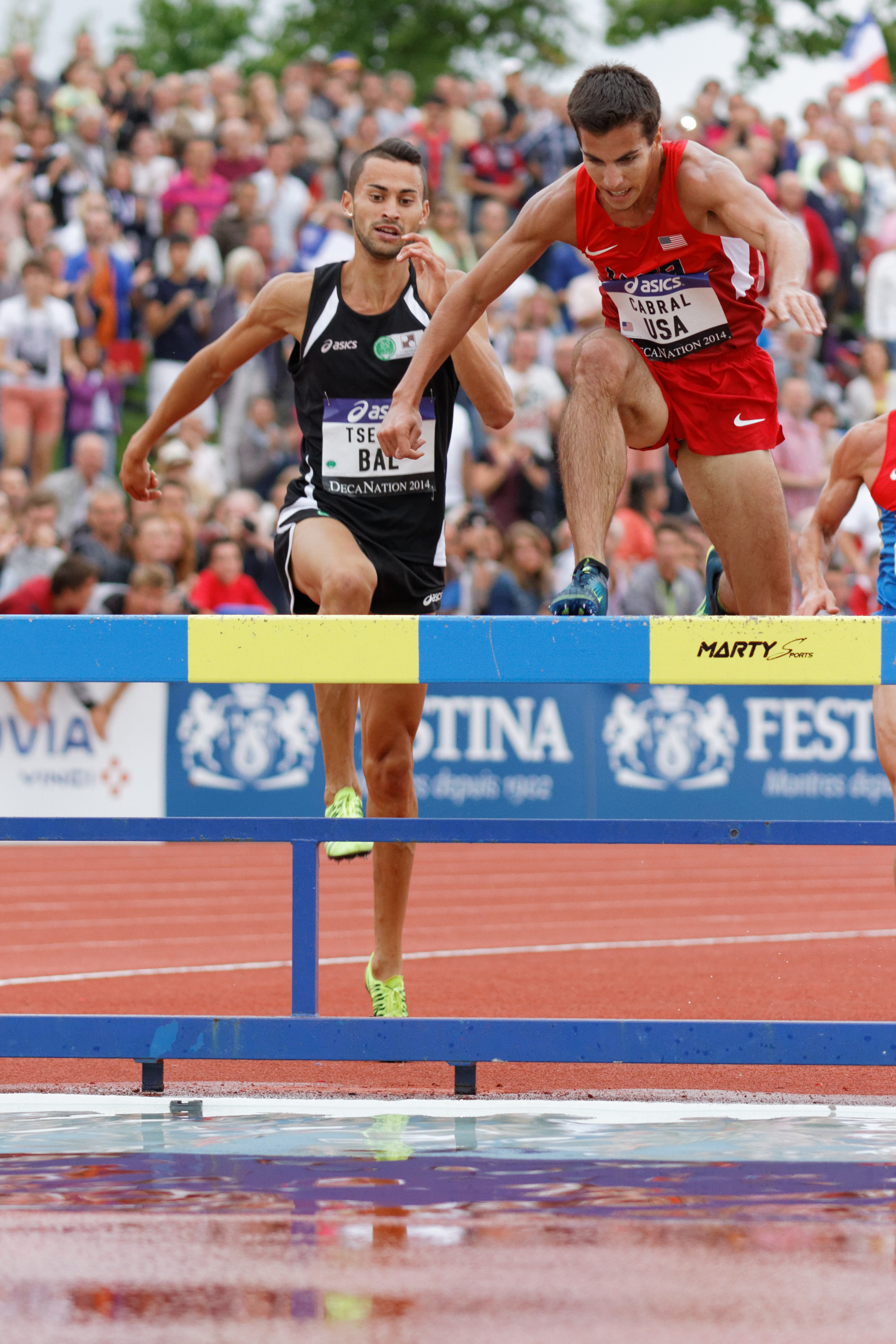
Cabral (right) racing Mitko Tsenov in a steeplechase in 2014

Cabral finished 17th in the 10,000 meters at the 2008 World Junior Championships. In the 2010 NACAC Under-23 Championships, he won the steeplechase with at time of 8:52.67.

Although a competitive collegiate runner, Cabral has focused his training on the Olympics. On June 28, 2012, Cabral qualified for the 2012 United States Olympic team as a steeplechase participant by finishing second to Evan Jager with a time of 8:19.81 in the 2012 United States Olympic Trials and surpassing the Olympic A standard time of 8:23.10. In an August 3, 2012 Olympic heat, Cabral finished 4th with a time of 8:21.46 in his 13-man heat, earning the last automatic berth to the August 5 finals. Cabral's time was 10th fastest of the 15 advancing runners (and of all 39 entrants), slower than all six qualifiers from heat 1 and faster than all 4 qualifiers from heat 2. In the finals, he led at the 1000 meter split with a time of 2:52.70, but he finished in eighth place with a time of 8:25.91.

Instead of continuing his collegiate career at another institution, he decided to go pro as a runner in the summer of 2012. After graduating from Princeton University in 2012, he signed with Nike; Following the 2012 Olympics and a little time off, Cabral moved to Bellingham, Washington, where he trained with former coach Peter Oviatt. In 2017 he signed with Hoka One One. He currently trains with the HOKA New Jersey*New York Track Club.

At the 2015 World Championships in Beijing, China, Cabral placed 10th in the 3000 m steeplechase with a time of 8:24.94.

Donn Cabral placed third in the steeplechase in a time of 8:26.37 at the 2016 United States Olympic Trials behind Team USA teammates Hillary Bor and Evan Jager to qualify to represent the United States at Athletics at the 2016 Summer Olympics in Brazil. He placed eighth in the steeplechase at the 2016 Olympics.

== Personal ==
His parents are John Cabral and Deborah Hadaway. His father is of Portuguese descent and coached him in soccer. At Princeton, Cabral earned his Bachelor of Arts degree in economics. After Princeton, Cabral earned both Master of Business Administration and Juris Doctor degrees from the University of Connecticut as part of a double degree program. In 2022, Donn married his longtime love Vruksha. They share a dog, Chiku, together.

== See also ==
- List of Princeton University Olympians
- 2017 in the sport of athletics
