= Welles-Shipman-Ward House =

Historic house in Connecticut, United States

- U.S. National Register of Historic Places
- U.S. Historic district – Contributing property
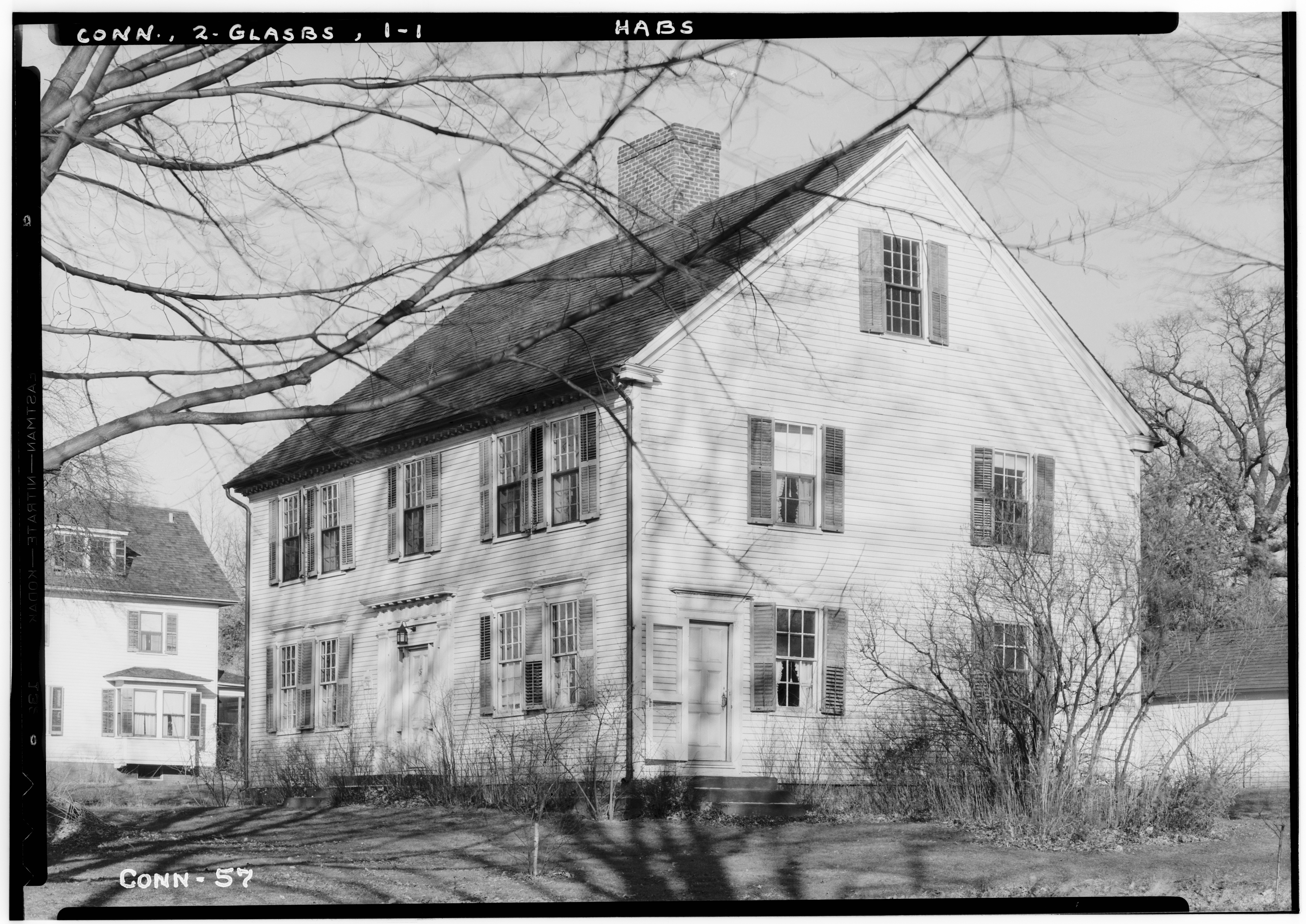
- HABS photo, 1937

- Location within Connecticut Location within the United States
- Location: 972 Main Street, South Glastonbury, Connecticut
- Coordinates: 41°40′8″N 72°36′7″W
- Area: 4 acres (1.6 ha)
- Built: 1755
- Architectural style: Georgian
- Part of: South Glastonbury Historic District (ID84000250)
- NRHP reference No.: 77001418

Significant dates
- Added to NRHP: September 19, 1977
- Designated CP: November 23, 1984

The Welles-Shipman-Ward House is a historic house museum at 972 Main Street in South Glastonbury, Connecticut. Built in 1755, it is a well-preserved example of Georgian architecture, with the largest period fireplace in Connecticut. The name comes from the prominent local families that owned it. It was listed on the National Register of Historic Places in 1977. It is now maintained by the Historical Society of Glastonbury.

== Description and history ==
The Welles-Shipman-Ward House is located in South Glastonbury, on the east side of Main Street (Connecticut Route 17), just north of its junction with Hopewell and High Streets. It is a 2 1/2-story wood-frame structure, with a side-gable roof, central chimney, and clapboarded exterior. The main facade is five bays wide, with a symmetrical window arrangement around a slightly larger central bay, where the entrance is located. The entrance is flanked by pilasters, which rise to a corniced entablature. Windows on the ground floor are topped by slightly projecting cornices with dentil moulding. A secondary entrance is located on the building's right side, with a less elaborate surround.

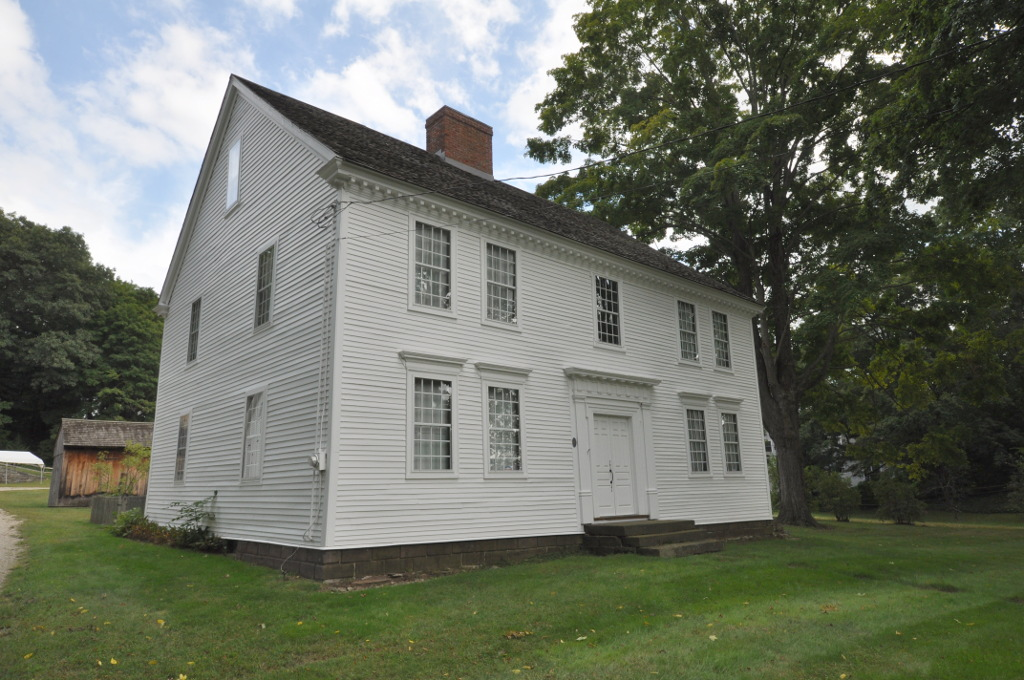
The house in 2018

The house was built in 1755 as a wedding gift for John Welles from his father Thomas. John's son George then sold the house to shipbuilder, merchant trader, and storeowner, Stephen Shipman, Jr. Shipman updated some of the architectural features, and the house remained in his family for over 125 years. In 1929, Berdena Hart Ward purchased the property and redecorated the house in an English country style. In 1963, Mrs. Ward donated the house and property to the Historical Society of Glastonbury with $10,000 endowment. Along with specialized historians, the Society for the Preservation of New England Antiquities and the American Wing of the Metropolitan Museum of Art of New York were part of a committee formed to undertake the restoration of the house and ensure its authenticity.

During the restoration, records were found showing that the property once contained a schoolhouse which indicated that the main house may have served as a dormitory building. Further into the restoration process, carved initials and children's drawings were found under layers of plaster and paint that contributed to speculation that schoolchildren were housed there.

Today the house and property is owned and maintained by the Historical Society of Glastonbury who run tours and a variety of historical events for the community there.
