= Rocky Hill–Glastonbury Ferry =

Ferry crossing in Connecticut, United States

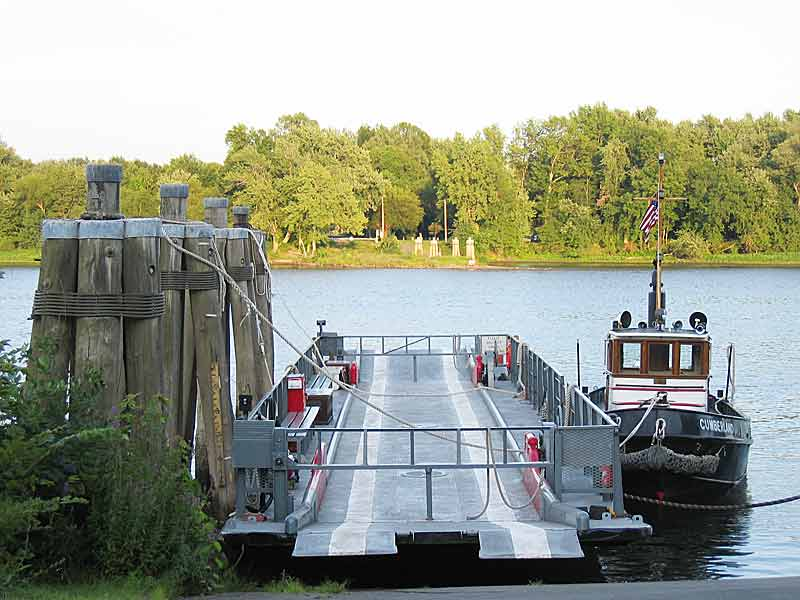
- The Hollister III (barge) and the Cumberland (tow boat)
- Waterway: Connecticut River
- Transit type: towboat and barge
- Route: Route 160
- Carries: pedestrians, bicycles, automobiles
- Terminals: Rocky Hill (41.666363°N 72.629648°W) to Glastonbury (41.66565°N 72.626537°W)
- Operator: Connecticut State Ferry Service
- Authority: Connecticut Department of Transportation (ConnDOT)
- Began operation: 1655
- Frequency: as needed
- No. of vessels: 2, Cumberland (towboat) and Hollister III (barge)
- Daily ridership: 400
- Website: Official website

The Rocky Hill–Glastonbury Ferry is a seasonal ferry crossing the Connecticut River between the towns of Glastonbury and Rocky Hill, Connecticut and is part of Route 160. It is believed to be the oldest continuously operated ferry service in the United States. The river crossing has an annual average daily traffic of 400.

== History ==
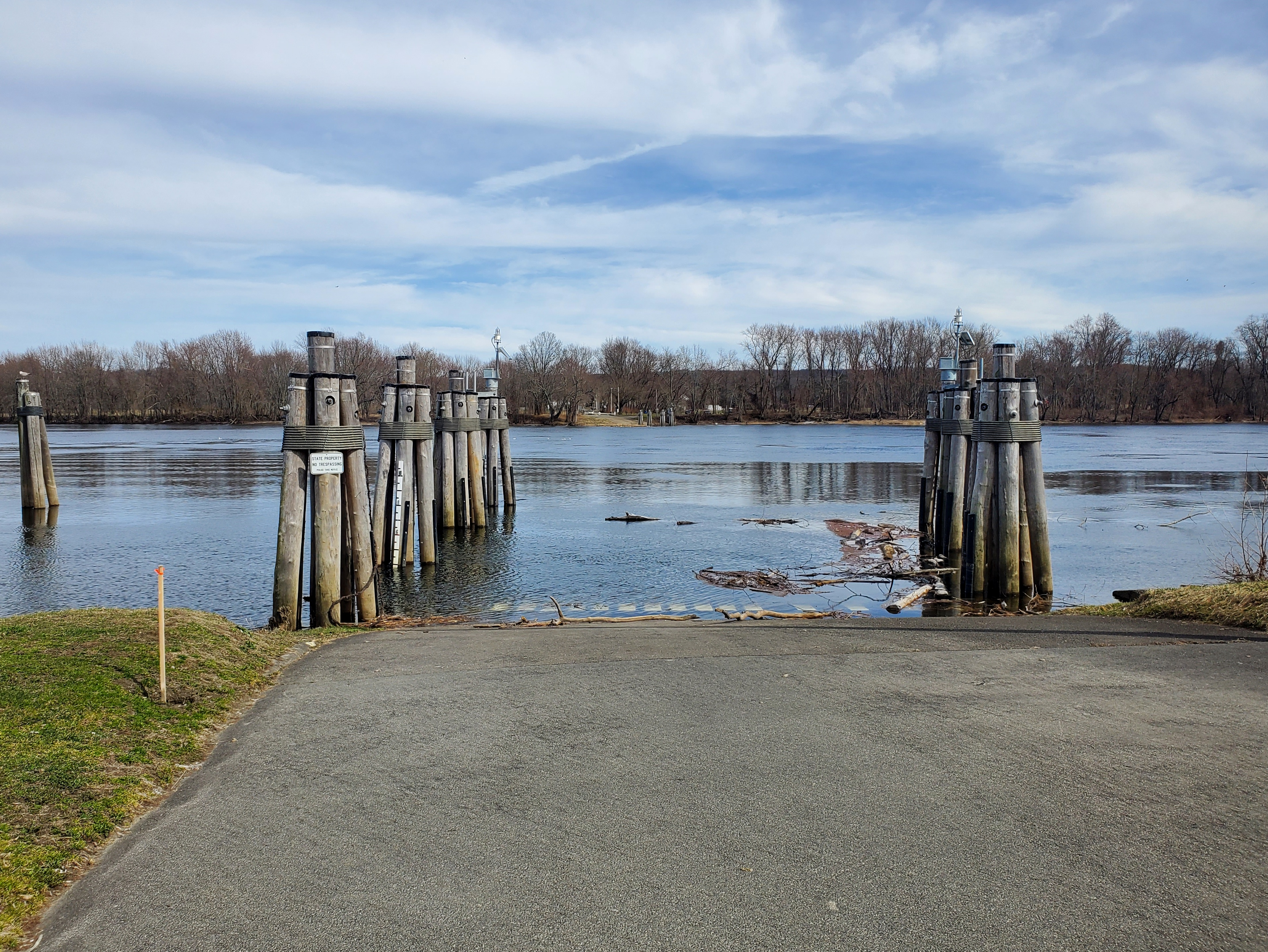
The west (Rocky Hill) terminal in 2023

The ferry is the oldest continuously running ferry service in the United States. Started in 1655, it actually began before the foundation of the towns of Glastonbury and Rocky Hill, both towns being part of Wethersfield at that time.

Originally a raft that was poled across the Connecticut River, it was then powered by a horse on a treadmill before being upgraded to a steamship in 1876. Today's ferry is a 3-car barge named the Hollister III towed by a diesel towboat named the Cumberland.

The ferry landings and the ferry itself are included in the Glastonbury–Rocky Hill Ferry Historic District, which was listed on the National Register of Historic Places in 2005. The National Register listing was proposed in 2005 to help preserve the historic ferry. The historic district also encompasses farmscapes of the Great Meadows in South Glastonbury that preserve 17th-century land use patterns and Colonial and Greek Revival farmhouses, as well as the homes of shipbuilders and merchant traders near the two landings, including several examples of Colonial and Italianate architecture.

The ferry was to be closed by the state on August 25, 2011, because of budget cuts. Though service was not cancelled when savings were found elsewhere in the state budget, the State Department of Transportation has been meeting with residents who wish to find a way to have the ferry be self-financing to at least a small extent.

== Use ==
Until 2024 the ferry was the only river crossing accessible to pedestrians and bicyclists between Hartford and Middletown, preventing what would otherwise have been a thirteen-mile (19 km) detour for them.

Operating between April 1 and November 30 (except Thanksgiving Day), the toll for cars is $5 on weekdays, and $6 on weekends. For cyclists & pedestrians it is $2.

== In popular culture ==
- This ferry was used in the music video for Billy Joel's "The River of Dreams."

== See also ==
- List of crossings of the Connecticut River
- Chester–Hadlyme Ferry, the second oldest continuously running ferry service in Connecticut operating just 25 miles (40 km) downstream.
