= Glastonbury Center, Connecticut =

Census-designated place in Connecticut, United States

- Census-designated place
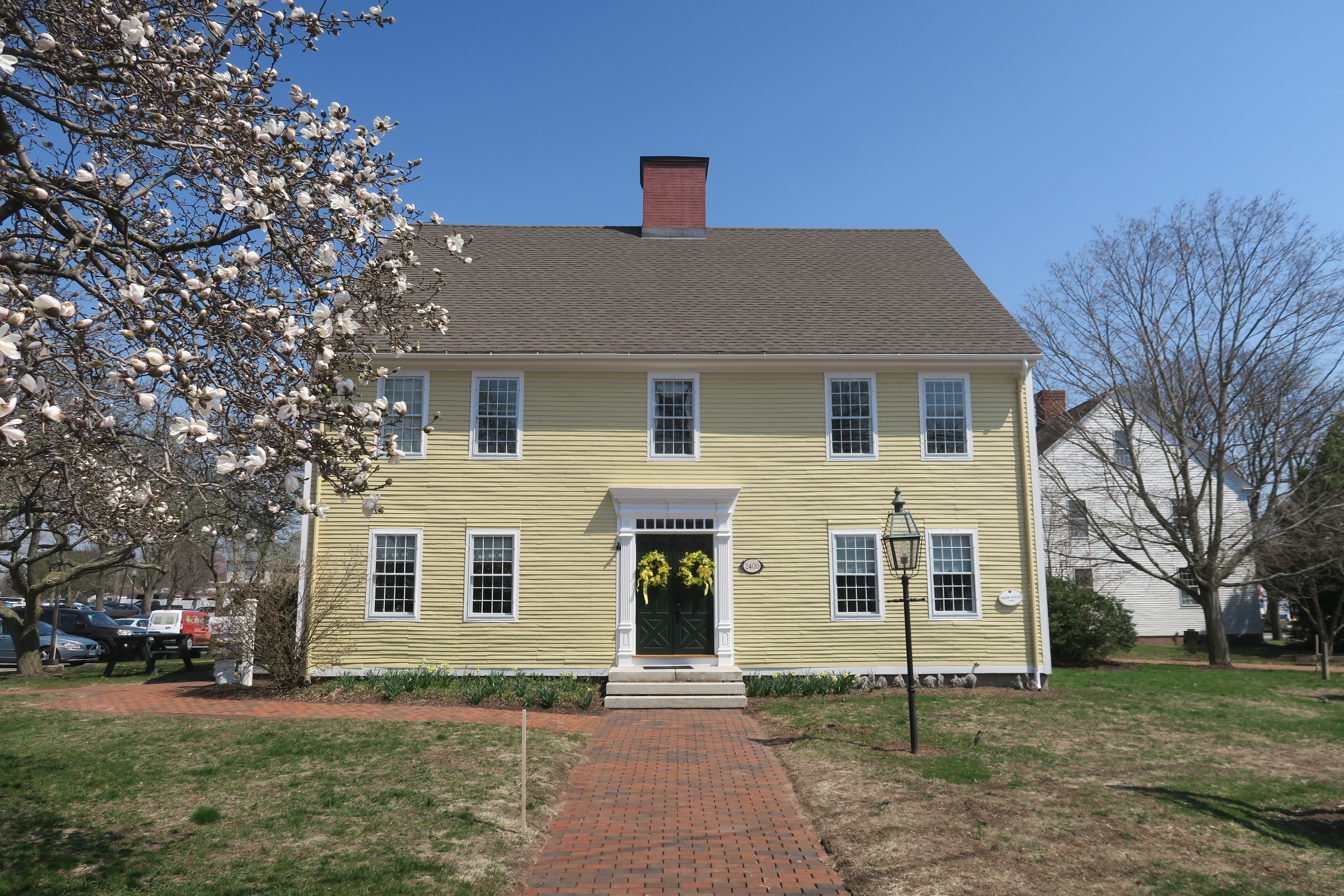
- Welles Chapman Tavern

- Location within Connecticut Location within the United States
- Coordinates: 41°42′44″N 72°36′31″W
- Country: United States
- State: Connecticut
- County: Hartford
- Town: Glastonbury

Area
  - Total: 4.9 sq mi (12.7 km^{2})
  - Land: 4.7 sq mi (12.3 km^{2})
  - Water: 0.15 sq mi (0.4 km^{2})
- Elevation: 50 ft (15 m)

Population (2010)
  - Total: 7,387
  - Density: 1,560/sq mi (601/km^{2})
- Time zone: UTC-5 (Eastern)
  - Summer (DST): UTC-4 (Eastern)
- ZIP code: 06033
- Area code: 860
- FIPS code: 09-31270
- GNIS feature ID: 2377822

Glastonbury Center is a census-designated place (CDP) that constitutes the densely populated center of Glastonbury in Hartford County, Connecticut, United States. As of the 2020 census, Glastonbury Center had a population of 8,459.

== Geography ==
Glastonbury Center is located in the northwestern part of Glastonbury, near the east bank of the Connecticut River, 7 miles (11 km) southeast of Hartford, the state capital. The Route 17 and Route 2 expressways merge at the northeastern edge of the CDP, bypassing the center of the village.

According to the United States Census Bureau, the Glastonbury Center CDP has a total area of 4.9 square miles (12.7 km^{2}), of which 4.7 square miles (12.3 km^{2}) is land and 0.15 square miles (0.4 km^{2}), or 3.30%, is water.

== Demographics ==
=== 2020 census ===
As of the 2020 census, Glastonbury Center had a population of 8,459. The median age was 47.0 years. 18.2% of residents were under the age of 18 and 24.3% of residents were 65 years of age or older. For every 100 females there were 86.0 males, and for every 100 females age 18 and over there were 83.3 males age 18 and over.

100.0% of residents lived in urban areas, while 0.0% lived in rural areas.

There were 3,870 households in Glastonbury Center, of which 24.1% had children under the age of 18 living in them. Of all households, 43.0% were married-couple households, 17.8% were households with a male householder and no spouse or partner present, and 34.7% were households with a female householder and no spouse or partner present. About 39.4% of all households were made up of individuals and 18.3% had someone living alone who was 65 years of age or older.

There were 4,132 housing units, of which 6.3% were vacant. The homeowner vacancy rate was 1.0% and the rental vacancy rate was 7.3%.

Racial composition as of the 2020 census
Race	Number	Percent
White	6,856	81.0%
Black or African American	175	2.1%
American Indian and Alaska Native	25	0.3%
Asian	658	7.8%
Native Hawaiian and Other Pacific Islander	2	0.0%
Some other race	215	2.5%
Two or more races	528	6.2%
Hispanic or Latino (of any race)	552	6.5%

=== 2000 census ===
As of the census of 2000, there were 7,157 people, 3,257 households, and 1,866 families residing in the CDP. The population density was 1,500.0 inhabitants per square mile (579.2/km^{2}). There were 3,405 housing units at an average density of 713.6 per square mile (275.5/km^{2}). The racial makeup of the CDP was 95.49% White, 0.88% African American, 0.21% Native American, 1.80% Asian, 0.94% from other races, and 0.68% from two or more races. Hispanic or Latino of any race were 2.57% of the population.

There were 3,257 households, out of which 24.2% had children under the age of 18 living with them, 47.6% were married couples living together, 7.8% had a female householder with no husband present, and 42.7% were non-families. 36.8% of all households were made up of individuals, and 17.2% had someone living alone who was 65 years of age or older. The average household size was 2.14 and the average family size was 2.84.

In the CDP, the population was spread out, with 20.2% under the age of 18, 4.0% from 18 to 24, 28.7% from 25 to 44, 25.3% from 45 to 64, and 21.8% who were 65 years of age or older. The median age was 43 years. For every 100 females, there were 81.9 males. For every 100 females age 18 and over, there were 77.2 males.

The median income for a household in the CDP was $58,947, and the median income for a family was $88,881. Males had a median income of $61,780 versus $43,646 for females. The per capita income for the CDP was $35,293. About 0.7% of families and 2.2% of the population were below the poverty line, including none of those under age 18 and 7.2% of those age 65 or over.
