= Glastonbury High School =

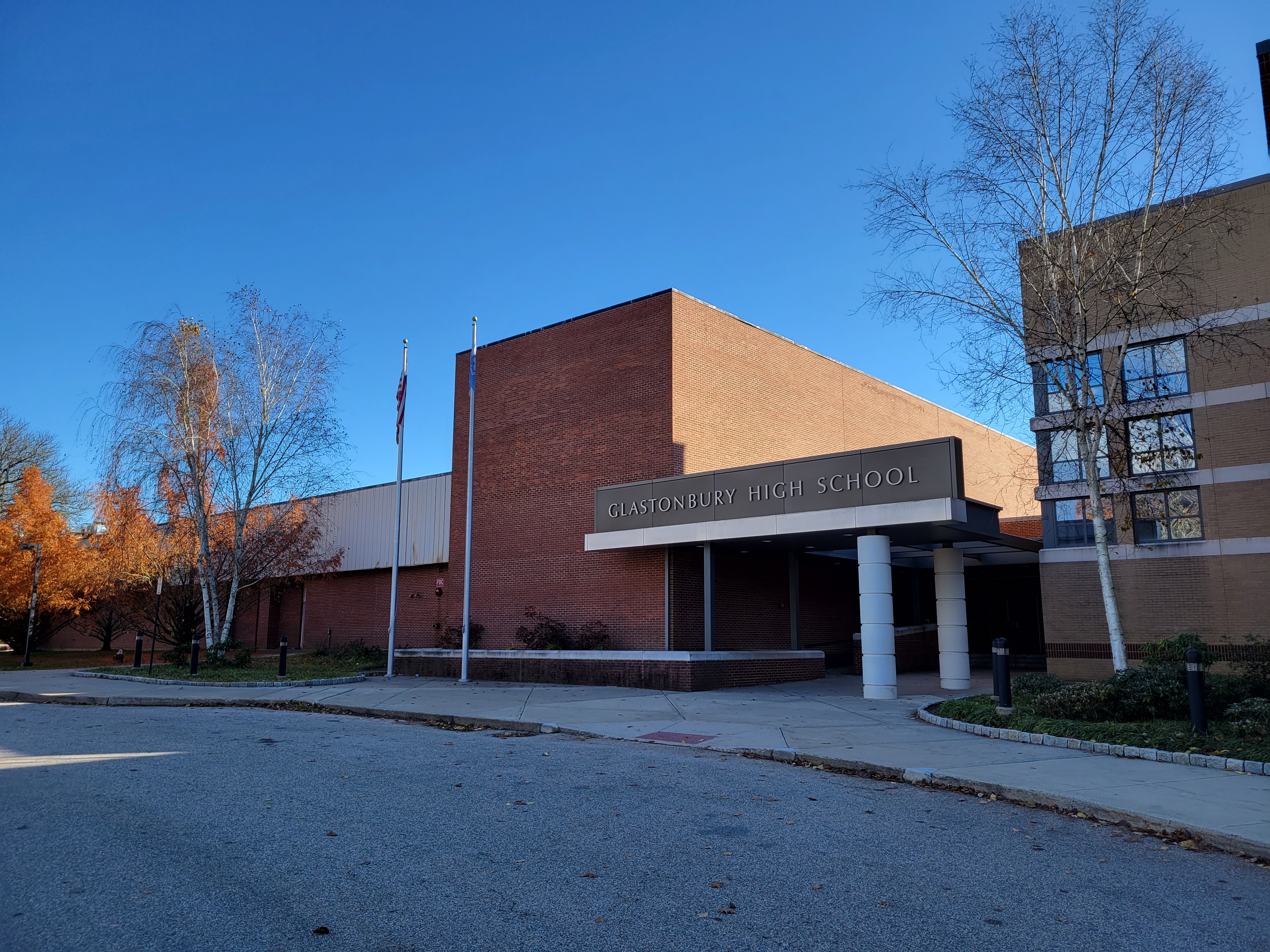
- Glastonbury High School

Location
- 330 Hubbard Street; Glastonbury, Hartford County, Connecticut 06033; United States; 41°42′05″N 72°35′36″W

Information
- Type: Public school
- School district: Glastonbury Public Schools
- Superintendent: Scott Hurwitz
- CEEB code: 070215
- Principal: Rebecca Comenale
- Teaching staff: 136.00 (on an FTE basis)
- Grades: 9-12
- Enrollment: 1,780 (2023-2024)
- Student to teacher ratio: 13.09
- Colors: Blue and white
- Team name: Guardians
- Website: sites.google.com/a/glastonburyus.org/ghs/

Glastonbury High School is a public, co-educational high school located in Glastonbury, Connecticut, United States.

As the only high school in Glastonbury, it serves around 2,000 students and employs around 150 faculty members. As of 2023, the school ranks 1,158th out of a possible 17,680 high schools nationally and is ranked 23rd out of a possible 198 high schools in Connecticut.

== Activities ==
Glastonbury High School (GHS) offers a variety of clubs and activities for students, including rowing, cross-country, football, swimming and diving, field hockey, soccer, lacrosse, volleyball, wrestling and track teams. The school also offers a variety of clubs.

== Athletics ==
Glastonbury High School's athletic programs were ranked among the best in the state and country in 2015, coming in at number 1 in Connecticut and 14 nationally. The school's team name was the Tomahawks until 2020, when the name changed to the Guardians.

=== State championships ===
The Glastonbury Guardians have won state championships in the following sports and seasons:

Class	Team	Year
Class LL	Girls Cross Country	2004, 2005, 2006, 2007, 2008, 2010, 2013, 2014, 2015, 2017, 2021, 2022, 2026
Open	Girls Cross Country	2007, 2008, 2010, 2017, 2022
Class LL	Boys Soccer	1989, 1999, 2003, 2005, 2013, 2014, 2015, 2017, 2018
Class L-M	Boys Soccer	1959, 1960
Class LL	Girls Outdoor Track	2007, 2010, 2021, 2022
Class LL	Girls Indoor Track	2006, 2007, 2008, 2011, 2012, 2015, 2020, 2022, 2023, 2025
Open	Girls Indoor Track	2011, 2020
Class LL	Girls Soccer	2011, 2014, 2015, 2016, 2019
Div. II	Boys Ice Hockey	1999, 2003
Class LL	Football	1989, 2008
Class L-I	Football	1984
Class M	Boys Cross Country	1958, 1959
Open	Boys Cross Country	1959
Class L	Girls Gymnastics	1988, 1989, 1994, 1995, 2011, 2012
Open	Girls Gymnastics	2011
Class L	Field Hockey	2010, 2014
Class L	Girls Tennis	1991, 1992, 2017
Class L	Girls Volleyball	1993
Class L	Boys Volleyball	2002
Div. I	Boys Golf	2014
Class L	Wrestling	1978
Class LL	Boys Tennis	1985
Open	Boys Tennis	1981
Class LL	Boys Outdoor Track	2019
Class M	Boys Outdoor Track	1960
Class M	Boys Cross Country	1958, 1959
Class LL	Girls Swimming & Diving	1976
Class L	Boys Swimming & Diving	1975
CSPRA (overall champion by points)	Boys & Girls Crew	2014, 2015, 2018, 2019, 2022, 2026
	Girls Crew	2011
	Girls Golf	1996, 1998
	Girls Ice Hockey	2015

== Renovations and building history ==
A renovation was completed in September, 2007. New science labs and classrooms were added to the school. The old science wing, auditorium, and gym facilities received major renovations, and the library and cafeteria each received an addition.

The Glastonbury Education Foundation funded a state-of-the-art digital television studio in May, 2008.

Glastonbury High School was built in 1953 and had renovations done in 2007 when a science wing was added.

In June 2016, the school board approved plans to build a brand new artificial turf soccer field with lights on the Baldwin Fields behind the school building. The field is planned to be built in 2017 and is estimated to cost around $1.6 million. Included in the plan are bleachers for 250 spectators, a fence around the field, and ball netting to catch loose balls. Space will be set aside for another project in the future which will include storage, bathrooms, and locker rooms.

In 2022 the school opened a new "STEAM" lab in the E wing where the automotive workshop was once located. The lab features software and technology to help students conduct their own research. The addition cost $300,000 to construct and an additional $400,000 to fully furnish. The renovation also included a renovation of the adjacent graphics design classroom.

== Notable alumni ==
- Laura Ingraham (1981), conservative political commentator, author, and radio host
- Amy Brenneman (1982), actress, writer and producer
- Jarosław Wałęsa (1995), member of the European Parliament for Poland
- Dan Barrett (1999), musician, co-creator of rock band Have A Nice Life and solo projects Giles Corey & Black Wing
- Ocean Vuong (2006), poet, essayist, and novelist
- Donn Cabral (2008) cross country and track runner, competed in 2012 and 2016 summer Olympics
- Alexandra Rojas (2013), political commentator, Executive Director of Justice Democrats
