= South Glastonbury Historic District =

Historic district in Connecticut, United States

- U.S. National Register of Historic Places
- U.S. Historic district
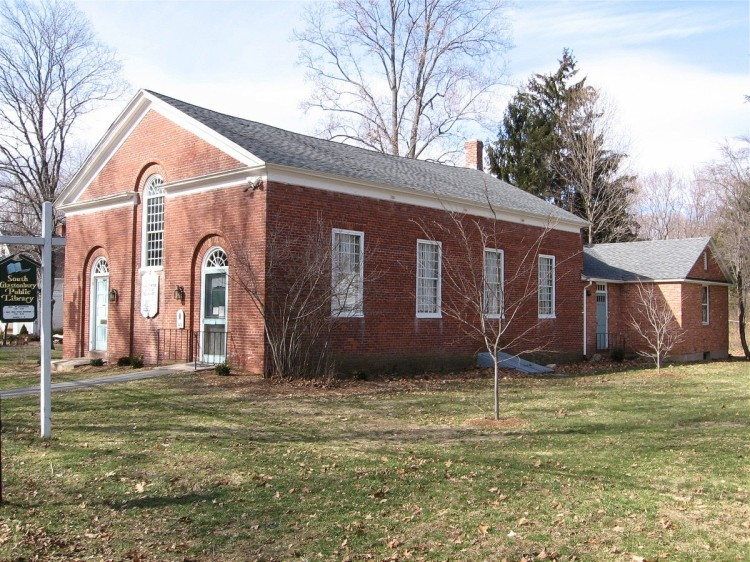
- The South Glastonbury Library, a former church building

- Location within Connecticut Location within the United States
- Location: High, Hopewell, Main and Water Streets; also 999-1417 and 1032-1420 Main Street, 6,7 Chestnut Hill Road, Glastonbury, Connecticut
- Coordinates: 41°39′59″N 72°36′15″W
- Area: 75 acres (30 ha) (1984 size)
- Architectural style: Greek Revival, Colonial, Queen Anne
- NRHP reference No.: 84000250 (original); 09000343 (increase)

Significant dates
- Added to NRHP: November 23, 1984
- Boundary increase: September 24, 2009

The South Glastonbury Historic District is a historic district in Glastonbury, Connecticut, United States. It encompasses the historic village center of South Glastonbury, which was first settled in the 17th century. The district was listed on the National Register of Historic Places in 1984, and enlarged in 2009 to include properties further along Main Street as far as Chestnut Hill Road. Locals refer to it as SoG.

== Description and history ==
The river meadows of South Glastonbury were used as farmland by the proprietors of Wethersfield, one of Connecticut's oldest colonial settlements, during the 17th century. By late in that century there was enough permanent settlement that Glastonbury was incorporated as a separate town in 1693. The Rocky Hill–Glastonbury ferry was at the time the only river crossing between the two communities, and High Street, extending east from the ferry, is the oldest road in Glastonbury. South Glastonbury developed as the town's first village, spurred in part by the development of grist and saw mills on Roaring Brook to the east. These were augmented by textile mills and other industry, prompting further growth in the 19th century. By the early 20th century these industries had closed or were in decline.

The village center is a triangle made up of all or part of Main, High, and Water Streets, and includes 83 contributing resources, including the public library, located in a former Methodist Church built in 1828, a c. 1740 house at 120 High Street, and the c. 1878 Carpenter Gothic St. Augustine's Church. The oldest surviving building is the c. 1731 Tryon House at 879 Main Street. One building was previously listed on the National Register: the Welles-Shipman-Ward House, a fine Georgian house built about 1755.

South Glastonbury contains Nayaug Elementary School, which opened August 2007.

== See also ==
- National Register of Historic Places listings in Hartford County, Connecticut
