= Glastonbury, Connecticut =

Town in Connecticut, US

- Town
- Town of Glastonbury
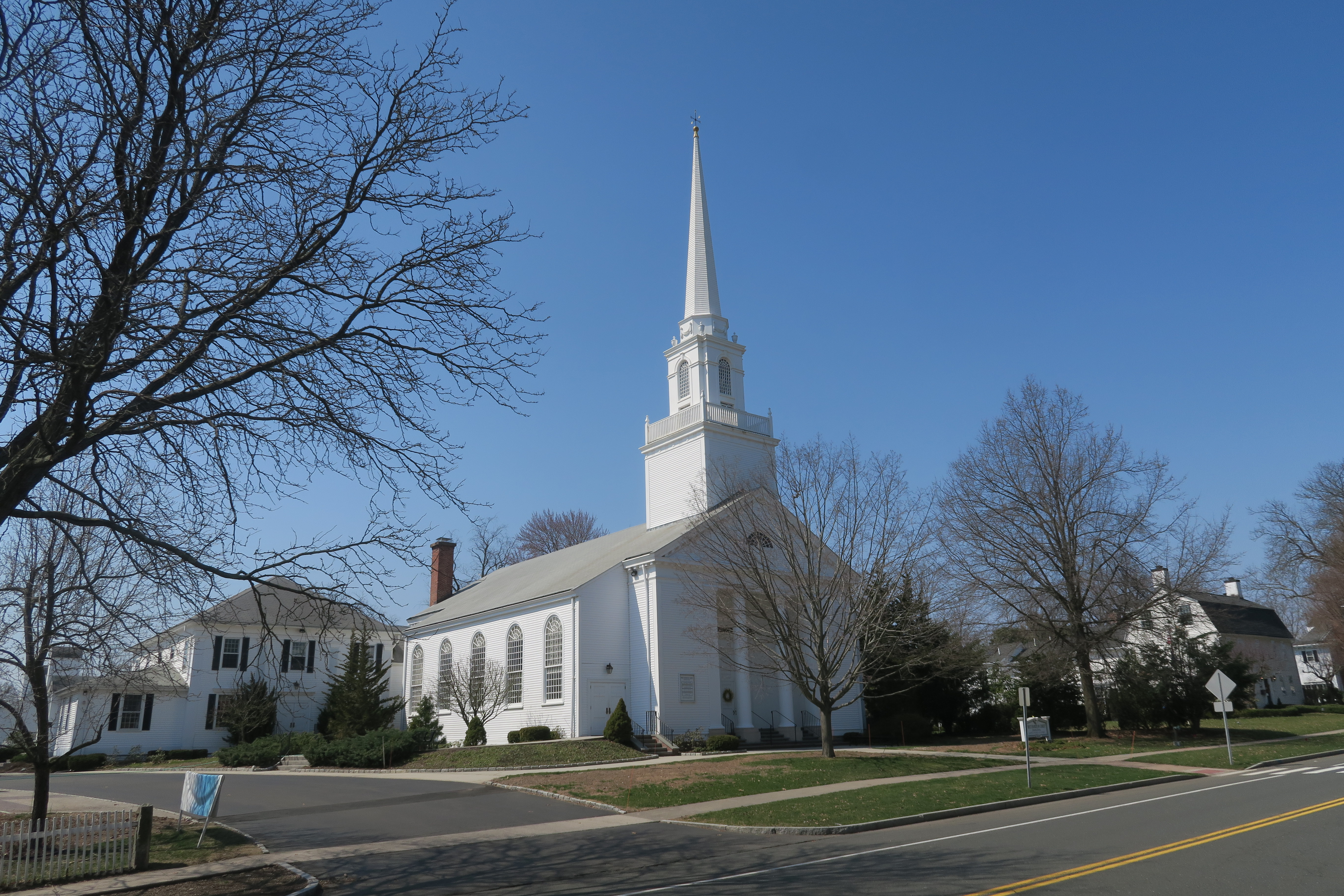
- First Church of Christ

- Flag Seal
- Interactive map of Glastonbury, Connecticut
- Coordinates: 41°41′13″N 72°32′41″W
- Country: United States
- U.S. state: Connecticut
- County: Hartford
- Region: Capitol Region
- Settled: 1636
- Incorporated: 1693
- Communities: Glastonbury; Addison; Buckingham; East Glastonbury; Hopewell; South Glastonbury; Welles Village

Government
  - Type: Council-manager
  - Town council: Corey Turner, Chairman; Jennifer Wang, Vice Chairman; Mary LaChance, Majority Leader; Kurt Cavanaugh, Minority Leader; Anthony DiLizia; Thomas Gullotta; Lawrence Niland; Whit Osgood; John Cavanna
  - Town Manager: Jonathan Luiz

Area
  - Total: 52.2 sq mi (135.2 km^{2})
  - Land: 51.3 sq mi (132.8 km^{2})
  - Water: 0.93 sq mi (2.4 km^{2})
- Elevation: 417 ft (127 m)

Population (2020)
  - Total: 35,159
  - Density: 685.7/sq mi (264.8/km^{2})
- Time zone: UTC-5 (Eastern)
  - Summer (DST): UTC-4 (Eastern)
- ZIP Codes: 06025, 06033, 06073
- Area codes: 860/959
- FIPS code: 09-31240
- GNIS feature ID: 0213432
- Website: www.glastonbury-ct.gov

Glastonbury (/ˈɡlæstənbɛri/ GLAST-ən-berr-ee) is a town in the Capitol Planning Region, Connecticut in Hartford County, United States, officially founded in 1693 and first settled in 1636. It was named after Glastonbury in Somerset, England. Glastonbury is on the banks of the Connecticut River, 7 miles (11 km) southeast of Hartford. The population was 35,159 at the 2020 census. Glastonbury sits at an elevation of approximately 154 feet (47 meters) above sea level.

== History ==
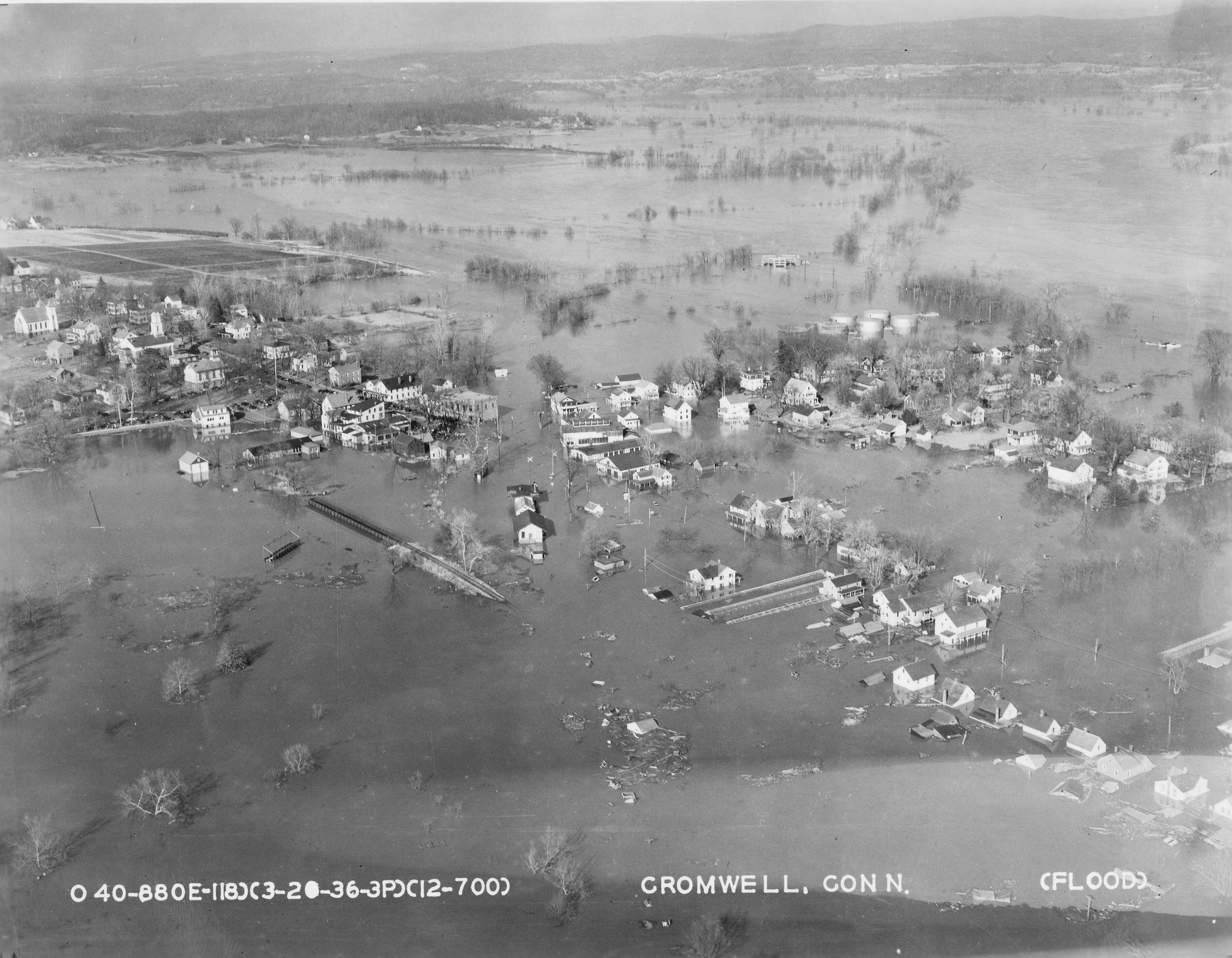
Flood of the Connecticut River, 1930

In 1636, 30 families settled in Pyaug, a tract of land belonging to Wethersfield on the eastern bank of the Connecticut River, purchased from the Native American chief Sowheag for 12 yards (11 m) of trading cloth. In 1672, the General Court granted Wethersfield and Hartford permission to extend Pyaug's boundary line 5 miles (8 km) to the east. By 1690, Wethersfield had permitted Pyaug residents to form a separate town and the town of Glassenbury was created in 1693.

The ties have not been completely broken: the oldest continuously operating ferry in the United States still runs between South Glastonbury and Rocky Hill, also then part of Wethersfield, as it did as far back as 1655. One result of being split off from Wethersfield was that the town was built along a main road, rather than around the large green, that anchors most New England towns. After part of New London Turnpike was realigned to eliminate the rotary in the middle of town during the mid-20th century, a small green was established there.

During the American Revolutionary War, several homes in Glastonbury were used to hold classes from Yale University. Noah Webster was a student in these classes; later he taught at one of the town's one-room schoolhouses.

Glassenbury freed its slaves in the 1780s, 60 years before Connecticut formally abolished slavery. The town organized its first library in 1803. It organized the first hospital shortly after the Revolution to combat and treat smallpox. By the end of the Revolution, there were ten schools, formed one by one during the 18th century.

During the American Revolution, George Stocking's gunpowder factory operated in the town. In 1785, the town residents renamed Glassenbury to Glastenbury. In the 18th and early 19th centuries, Glastenbury was a shipbuilding town. Located on the Connecticut River, it had reliable waterpower and nearby hardwood forests of oak. Sawmills, charcoal kilns, and foundries developed around the shipyards to process timber and other goods for their needs.

As shipbuilding was ending, the early industrial beginning continued. The J.B. Williams Soap Factory started in 1840 in James B. Williams's drugstore in Manchester, where he experimented with chemical formulas for shaving soap. When he had produced a formula that satisfied him, he moved his business to Glastenbury. Two years later, he was joined by his brother, William Stuart Williams. They formed what is believed to be the world's first commercial soap manufacturing business. Although shaving soap was their first product, they also made ink and shoe blacking. The J.B. Williams Company's products included Williams' Lectric Shave and Aqua Velva. Over time, J.B. Williams expanded to Montreal (around 1922), England, and Argentina. When the business was sold in 1957, ten former employees organized Glastonbury Toiletries and continued operation into the 1970s. J. B. Williams Park, on Neipsic Road, is named for James B. Williams.

Remaining parts of the industrial complex have been adapted for use as the Soap Factory Condominiums. Another portion was occupied by the Glastonbury Board of Education office and is now occupied by a translation company.

In 1870, the town's name was changed from Glastenbury to Glastonbury, to match Glastonbury, England. During the World Wars, Glastonbury factories supplied leather and woolen goods to the militaries of Belgium, France, Great Britain, Italy, and the United States. In addition, Glastonbury has been a center for feldspar mills, cotton mills, paper mills, and silver plate factories. It also had an airplane building industry.

J.H. Hale Orchards began operations in 1866 in Glastonbury. John Howard Hale became known as the Peach King for developing a peach that could withstand New England winters and was disease-resistant, as well as for his operations' large, national scale. He also had land in Georgia and was the first Glastonbury industry to establish a branch outside the state. A marketing pioneer, Hale shipped peaches to markets all over the country. The orchard that started with 1-acre (4,000 m^{2}) in 1866 grew to more than 1,200 acres (5 km^{2}) by 1900.

Hale never went beyond grade-school, but he initiated the founding of Storrs Agricultural College, now the University of Connecticut. He helped to organize the Glastonbury Grange and the State Grange. His home, at the intersection of Main Street and Route 17, was adapted in the 20th century for use first as a restaurant and, more recently, for business offices.

Henry Saglio began a pioneering effort to breed a white chicken, because black pinfeathers were difficult to pluck from a bird headed for the dinner table. In 1948, the Saglio Brothers formed Arbor Acres and produced a broiler chicken that A&P Food Stores awarded the title "Chicken of Tomorrow". By 1958, Arbor Acres was selling globally. Today the brand is owned by Aviagen. In 1977, Henry Saglio was inducted into the Poultry Hall of Fame.

Glastonbury was also a major grower of broad-leaf tobacco. This agricultural tradition is carried on by the orchards and berry farms on its hills.

In 1993, Billy Joel filmed part of the video for his song "The River of Dreams" in a barn in South Glastonbury. The video also has a scene with the Rocky Hill-Glastonbury Ferry.

== Geography ==
According to the United States Census Bureau, the town has an area of 52.2 square miles (135.2 km^{2}), of which 51.3 square miles (132.8 km^{2}) is land and 0.93 square miles (2.4 km^{2}) or 1.76% is water. The Glastonbury Center CDP has an area of 4.9 square miles (12.7 km^{2}), of which 3.30% is water.

The town begins on the banks of the Connecticut River and extends up into foothills, many of which provide a view of Hartford's skyline. Some major developments in the town are built entirely on relatively steep hills, such as Minnechaug Mountain, which became the site of a major residential area developed from the 1970s until the late 1990s.

Part of Glastonbury lies in an area called Kongscut Mountain, locally called Rattlesnake Mountain, because it has a small population of timber rattlesnakes. Since that area is sparsely developed and mostly in a state forest, the snakes pose little threat.

The town has a small private lake, Diamond Lake, surrounded by growing subdivisions of large homes. Access to the lake is limited to members of the Diamond Lake Property Owners Association.

Glastonbury has one of the largest state forests, Meshomasic State Forest, a popular area for hiking, fishing, and hunting.

Glastonbury borders the town and cities of East Hartford, Wethersfield, Rocky Hill, Cromwell, Portland, East Hampton, Marlborough, Hebron, Bolton, and Manchester.

=== Climate ===
The town center experiences a humid continental climate (Dfa). However, the rural parts of the town, at an elevation of 800 feet near Bolton and Hebron, experience a colder climate which straddles the (Dfa) and (Dfb) lines.

Climate data for Glastonbury, Connecticut
Month	Jan	Feb	Mar	Apr	May	Jun	Jul	Aug	Sep	Oct	Nov	Dec	Year
Record high °F (°C)	70 (21)	74 (23)	86 (30)	93 (34)	99 (37)	100 (38)	101 (38)	102 (39)	101 (38)	89 (32)	83 (28)	75 (24)	102 (39)
Mean daily maximum °F (°C)	36 (2)	39 (4)	48 (9)	60 (16)	70 (21)	79 (26)	84 (29)	82 (28)	75 (24)	63 (17)	52 (11)	41 (5)	61 (16)
Mean daily minimum °F (°C)	18 (−8)	22 (−6)	29 (−2)	40 (4)	49 (9)	59 (15)	65 (18)	63 (17)	54 (12)	43 (6)	35 (2)	24 (−4)	42 (5)
Record low °F (°C)	−17 (−27)	−24 (−31)	−4 (−20)	11 (−12)	25 (−4)	39 (4)	45 (7)	38 (3)	29 (−2)	18 (−8)	5 (−15)	−12 (−24)	−24 (−31)
Average precipitation inches (mm)	3.15 (80)	2.75 (70)	3.57 (91)	3.88 (99)	3.88 (99)	3.99 (101)	4.00 (102)	3.66 (93)	3.48 (88)	4.14 (105)	3.84 (98)	3.35 (85)	43.7 (1,110)
Source: The Weather Channel (Historical Monthly Averages)

=== Communities ===
- Addison
- Buckingham
- East Glastonbury
- Glastonbury Center
- Hopewell
- South Glastonbury

== Demographics ==
Historical population
Census	Pop.	Note	%±
1820	3,114		—
1840	3,007		—
1850	3,390		12.7%
1860	3,363		−0.8%
1870	3,560		5.9%
1880	3,580		0.6%
1890	3,457		−3.4%
1900	4,260		23.2%
1910	4,796		12.6%
1920	5,592		16.6%
1930	5,783		3.4%
1940	6,632		14.7%
1950	8,818		33.0%
1960	14,497		64.4%
1970	20,651		42.5%
1980	24,327		17.8%
1990	27,901		14.7%
2000	31,876		14.2%
2010	34,427		8.0%
2020	35,159		2.1%
U.S. Decennial Census 2020

According to the 2020 U.S. Census, the racial makeup of the town was 82.8% White, 1.7% African American, 0.2% Native American, 9.1% Asian, 0.3% Pacific Islander, and 4.1% from two or more races. Hispanic or Latino of any race were 7.6% of the population. There were 35,159 people and 14,078 households. The population density was 685.9 inhabitants per square mile. There were 12,614 housing units at an average density of 245.5 per square mile (94.8/km^{2}).

The population was distributed with 4.8% under age 5, 20.8% under 18, and 20.0% 65 years of age or older. Women were 51% of the population.

As of 2024, the median household income in the town is $140,836.

== Economy ==
=== Top employers ===
Top employers in Glastonbury according to the town's 2025 Comprehensive Annual Financial Report

#	Employer	# of Employees
1	Healthtrax Inc.	1,000–4,999
2	Glastonbury Town and BOE	1,000–4,999
3	Open Solutions	250–499
4	Whole Foods Market	100–249
5	J. Gilberts Wood-Fires Steaks	100–249
6	The Home Depot	100–249
7	Stop & Shop	100–249
8	Glastonbury Healthcare Ctr	100–249
9	Salmon Brook Health and Rehab	100–249
10	Smith Brothers Insurance LLC	100–249

== Arts and culture ==
=== Historical houses ===
Glastonbury has the second-highest number of genuine colonial houses of any U.S. town. There are 154 houses built before 1800; only Marblehead, Massachusetts, has more, with over 200. Newport, Rhode Island, has over 300, but it is a city, not a town. Four houses in Glastonbury are from the 1600s.

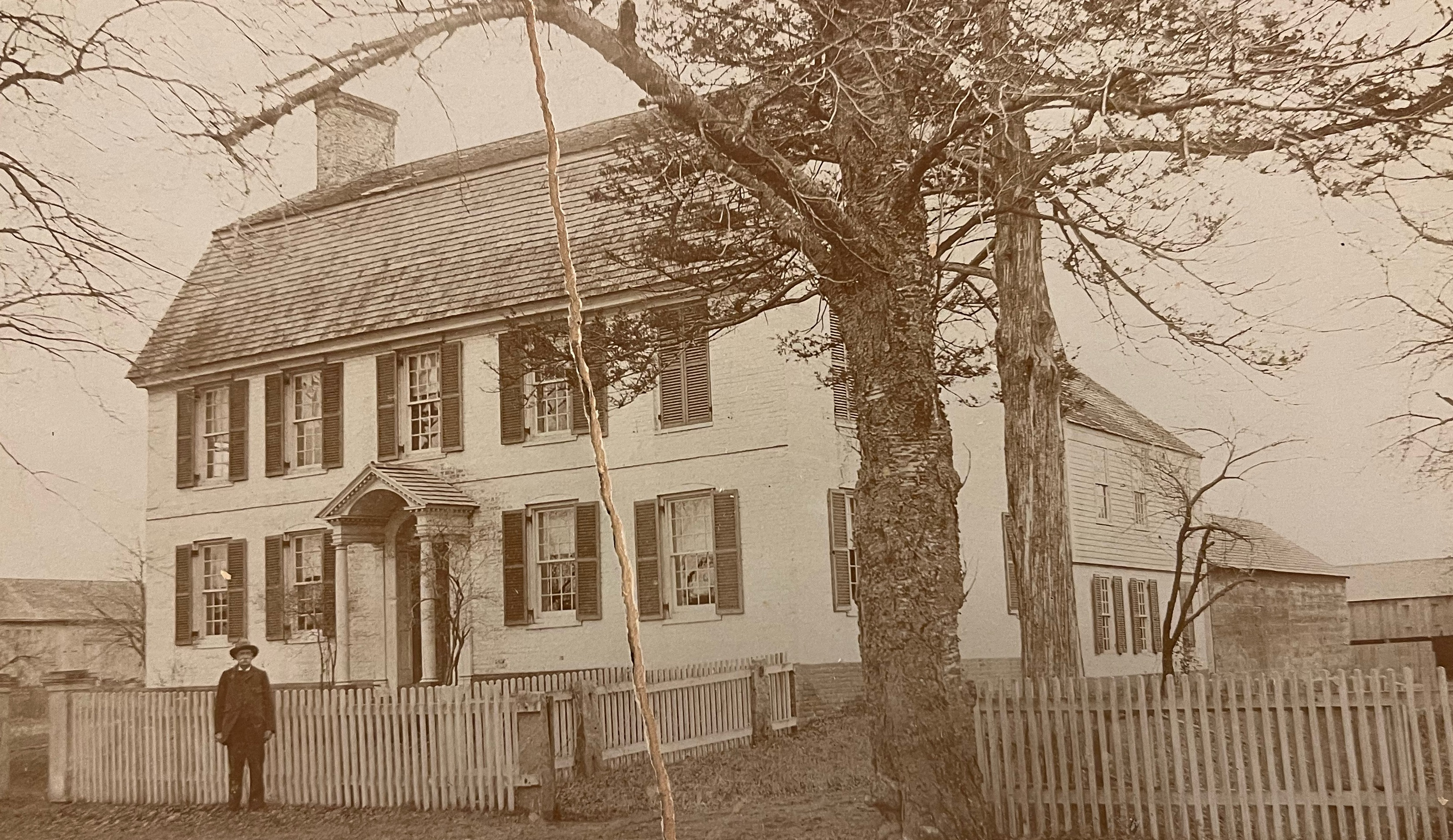
Historic photograph of the Theodore Hale House in Glastonbury, Connecticut.

The Jonathan Hale House (also known as the Theodore Hale House), located on Main Street, is among Connecticut's oldest surviving brick houses. A later member of the Hale family, Jonathan Hale, left Glastonbury in 1810 to settle in Ohio's Western Reserve, where his homestead is now preserved as Hale Farm and Village, a living history museum operated by the Western Reserve Historical Society.

The town's oldest house, the John Hollister House, was built around 1675. It is one of Connecticut's five oldest houses, and one of the oldest in the nation.

== Parks and recreation ==
The town has four private pool and tennis clubs: Minnechaug, Orchard Hill, Woodledge, and Pinebrook. Glastonbury also has a private country club with a golf course, Glastonbury Hills Country Club. The town's other golf course is the nine-hole Minnechaug Golf Course, at the base of Minnechaug Mountain and owned by the town.

Public aquatic facilities include the Grange pool, Eastbury Pond, an indoor pool at Glastonbury High School, and a pool at Addison Park.

Cotton Hollow Nature Preserve is in South Glastonbury and is open to residents for fishing and hiking. It covers 80 acres, and during the 18th and 19th centuries was home to several mills, which no longer stand, except for the ruins of the cotton mill built in 1814. The stream of water that runs through the preserve is known as Roaring Brook.

Glastonbury is also home to several parks open to residents, including Addison Park, Blackledge Falls, Buckingham Park, Butler Field, Center Green, Earle Park, Cotton Hollow Nature Preserve, Eastbury Pond, Ferry Landing, Grange Pool, Great Pond Reserve, Hubbard Green, Riverfront Park, Salmon Brook Park, Shoddy Mill Preserve, and J.B. Williams Park.

== Government ==
Glastonbury town vote by party in presidential elections
Year	Democratic	Republican	Third Parties
2020	62.53% 13,990	35.75% 7,998	1.72% 386
2016	56.43% 11,074	38.38% 7,533	5.19% 1,018
2012	52.88% 10,135	45.96% 8,809	1.16% 222
2008	59.50% 11,767	39.21% 7,755	1.29% 256
2004	52.19% 9,971	46.34% 8,854	1.47% 280
2000	50.88% 9,134	44.16% 7,928	4.96% 890
1996	47.55% 7,811	41.11% 6,754	11.34% 1,863
1992	39.67% 6,976	38.89% 6,840	21.44% 3,770
1988	41.81% 6,638	57.24% 9,088	0.95% 151
1984	34.19% 5,015	65.44% 9,599	0.37% 54
1980	30.78% 4,283	50.44% 7,019	18.78% 2,614
1976	39.10% 4,952	60.28% 7,634	0.62% 78
1972	36.56% 4,145	62.71% 7,111	0.73% 83
1968	40.38% 3,813	54.91% 5,185	4.70% 444
1964	59.79% 4,991	40.21% 3,357	0.00% 0
1960	43.15% 3,267	56.85% 4,305	0.00% 0
1956	32.21% 2,052	67.79% 4,319	0.00% 0

Voter Registration and Party Enrollment as of October 27, 2015
Party	Active Voters	Inactive Voters	Total Voters	Percentage
Democratic	6,554	668	7,222	31.78%
Republican	5,505	374	5,879	25.87%
Unaffiliated	8,469	976	9,445	41.56%
Minor parties	161	18	179	0.79%
Total	20,689	2,036	22,725	100%

== Education ==
Glastonbury has five elementary schools: Buttonball Lane School, Hebron Avenue School, Hopewell School, Naubuc School, and Nayaug School. A sixth, Eastbury School, closed in 2018. Each school has between 288 and 608 students. Glastonbury has two middle schools: Gideon Welles School, which serves 6th grade and has just over 500 students, and Smith Middle School, which serves 7th and 8th grades and has 1,035 students. The town's high school, Glastonbury High School, had 2,173 students as of October 2013.

Glastonbury's school system was referenced in episode 563, Act 2, of the radio show This American Life.

== Infrastructure ==
=== Media ===
Glastonbury is served by regional and local media outlets. The Hartford Courant, the largest daily newspaper in Connecticut, regularly covers news from Glastonbury and the surrounding Capitol Region. The town is also covered by The Glastonbury Citizen, a weekly print and digital newspaper that reports on local government, schools, community events, and obituaries.

Public access television programming is produced by Glastonbury Community TV (GCTV), a municipal station that broadcasts town meetings, educational programming, and local community content. GCTV operates channels 16, 17, and 18 on Cox Communications within the town, and also streams content online via its website and YouTube channel.

In terms of radio and broadcast media, Glastonbury is part of the Hartford–New Haven media market. Residents can receive signals from a wide range of AM and FM radio stations as well as local network television affiliates based in Hartford, including WTIC-TV (Fox), WFSB (CBS), WVIT (NBC), and WTNH (ABC).

=== Transportation ===
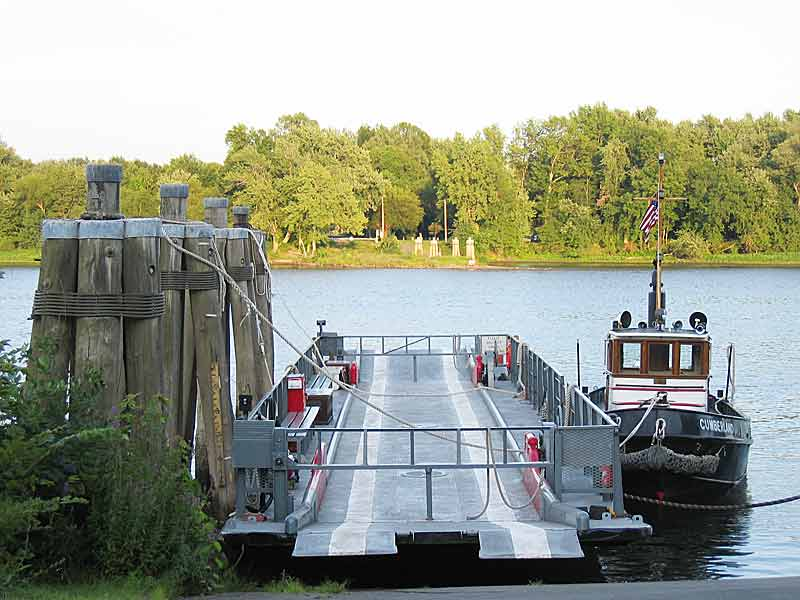
Glastonbury Ferry

- Glastonbury's major highway is Connecticut Route 2, serving the town with six exits.
- Connecticut Route 3 only has the Main Street exit in Glastonbury. The expressway then proceeds westward across the Putnam Bridge into Wethersfield before connecting with Interstate 91.
- Route 17 has two exits in Glastonbury: the New London Turnpike and Hubbard Street. It then reduces to a surface street, merging with Main Street in South Glastonbury.
- The 95 (formerly O) route of Connecticut Transit (CT Transit) buses runs between downtown Hartford and Glastonbury, usually terminating at the corner of Main Street and Hebron Avenue. The 91 (formerly X) route travels between Wethersfield and the Buckland Hills area in Manchester via the Somerset Square Shopping Center. The 904-Glastonbury Express route conveniently operates into Putnam Bridge, St. Paul's, and St. Augustine's Park & Ride lots.
- The Rocky Hill–Glastonbury ferry operates between May 1 and October 31. It is the nation's oldest continually operating ferry, dating to 1655. Fees are $5 for a vehicle and $1 for pedestrians and bicyclists. The trip across the Connecticut River takes about four minutes.

== Notable people ==
- Amy Brenneman, actress
- Bob Backlund, professional wrestler
- Samuel J. Battle, first Black police officer in the NYPD, lived and worked in East Glastonbury in 1899 upon coming north from North Carolina
- Candace Bushnell, author, journalist and television producer
- Zandra Flemister, first African-American woman United States Secret Service agent
- William Hoyt, gold medalist in the 1896 Summer Olympics
- Laura Ingraham, conservative television host
- Roy Nutt, co-creator of Fortran
- Dan Barrett, musician
- Helen Maria Roser, nurse, nursing educator
- Smiths of Glastonbury, family of five sisters active in 19th century women's suffrage and abolition movements
- Ocean Vuong, poet, essayist, and novelist
- Gideon Welles, Secretary of the Navy under Abraham Lincoln
- Thomas Welles, governor of Connecticut in 1658 and 1659
- Denny Zimmerman, racing driver
