= 2011 United States state legislative elections =

- November 8, 2011

9 legislative chambers 5 states (Note: Including a wave of recall elections in Wisconsin)
| | Majority party | Minority party | Third party |
|---|---|---|---|
| Party | Republican | Democratic | Coalition |
| Chambers before | 60 (Note: Republicans took control of the Mississippi State Senate, the Louisiana House of Representatives, and the Louisiana State Senate through party switching and special elections earlier in the year.) | 37 (Note: The Oregon House of Representatives was tied in the 2011-2013 session; the chamber is not counted towards the total here.) | 1 (Note: The Alaska Senate was controlled by a coalition of Democrats and Republicans. The minority caucus consists of Republicans who were not part of the majority coalition.) |
| Chambers after | 62 | 35 | 1 |
| Overall change | ▲2 | ▼2 | Steady |
- Map of upper house elections: Democrats retained control Republicans gained control Republicans retained control No regularly-scheduled elections

- Map of lower house elections: Democrats retained control Republicans gained control Republicans retained control No regularly-scheduled elections

The 2011 United States state legislative elections were held on November 8, 2011. Eight legislative chambers in four states held regularly scheduled elections. These off-year elections coincided with other state and local elections, including gubernatorial elections in four states.

These were the first elections to be affected by redistricting after the 2010 census. Additionally, the first wave of recall elections occurred in the Wisconsin Senate; while Republicans lost seats, they maintained a narrow majority. A second wave would occur in 2012.

Republicans flipped control of the Virginia Senate, thereby establishing a trifecta. In Mississippi, Republicans won the state House for the first time since 1876. After having gained an outright majority in the Mississippi Senate in February 2011 due to party switching, Republicans retained control of the chamber in the November 2011 election. Republicans thus obtained a trifecta in the state for the first time since 1876 as a result.

In Louisiana, Republicans gained a majority in the State House in December 2010 when a state representative switched parties, and majority control of the State Senate by winning a February 2011 special election. Republicans maintained control of both chambers in November, thereby giving Republicans control of Senate for the first time since 1877, and the state house and a trifecta for the first time since 1873.

== Background ==
Republicans made historic gains in the 2010 elections, flipping control of twenty legislative chambers across the country. Republicans made especially large gains in the South, winning control of a number of chambers for the first time since Reconstruction. Additionally, post-election party switching gave Republicans control of the Louisiana House of Representatives. Three Southern states, Louisiana, Mississippi, and Virginia, did not hold regularly scheduled elections in 2010, but many took the 2010 results as a sign that Republicans would soon gain full control of these states as well.

=== Louisiana Senate special elections ===
Despite losing control of the Louisiana House of Representatives and losing multiple seats in the Louisiana Senate due to late 2010 party switching, Democrats held a narrow majority of seats in the Louisiana Senate at the beginning of 2011. However, two special elections were scheduled to fill vacant seats in the chamber held by non-Republicans early in the year. Republicans won them both, flipping control of the Louisiana Senate and giving the party a government trifecta in the state.

| District | | Incumbent | | | This race | |
| Chamber | No. | Representative | Party | First elected | Results | Candidates |
|---|---|---|---|---|---|---|
| Senate | 22 | Troy Hebert | Independent | 2007 | Incumbent resigned in November 2010 to become Louisiana's alcohol and tobacco control commissioner. New member elected January 22, 2011. Republican gain. | ▌ ✓ Fred Mills (Republican) 59.8%; ▌ Simone B. Champagne (Republican) 18.9%; ▌ David Groner (Independent) 12.8%; ▌ Armond Schwing (Republican) 7.7%; ▌ Ruben LeBlanc (Independent) 1.0%; ▌ Ken Squires (Republican) 0.8% |
| Senate | 26 | Nick Gautreaux | Democratic | 2007 | Incumbent resigned in December 2010 to become head of the state Department of Motor Vehicles. New member elected February 19, 2011. Republican gain. | ▌ ✓ Jonathan Perry (Republican) 51.7%; ▌ Nathan Granger (Democratic) 48.3% |

=== Mississippi Senate ===
Shortly after the 2010 election, Mississippi Senator Cindy Hyde-Smith switched parties and joined the Republicans, producing a 26–26 tie in the Mississippi Senate. In February, Senator Ezell Lee, who had been voting more and more frequently with Republicans, solidified his own switch to the party by filing to run for re-election as a Republican, flipping control of the chamber to the Republicans. Lee later lost in the primary election.

=== Redistricting ===
The 2011 elections were the first held after the release of the results of the 2010 census; each of the four states up for election in 2011 attempted to draw new maps in accordance with the new population data. Republicans exercised full control of redistricting in Louisiana after having taken control of both chambers of the legislature in late 2010 and early 2011. Both parties shared control of the redistricting process in Mississippi, New Jersey, and Virginia, with varied results coming out of each state.

==== Mississippi ====
In Mississippi, Democrats controlled the House of Representatives, while Republicans controlled the governorship and gained control of the Senate early in the year due to party switching. Typically, the Mississippi legislature followed the tradition of each chamber passing the others' maps without interference; however, the Republican-controlled Senate voted to reject the Democratic-passed House of Representatives map, deadlocking the redistricting process and drawing several lawsuits, including from the NAACP. As the legislature showed no signs of resolving its impasse, federal courts took up the process. The NAACP sought new maps to remedy the population disparities that had grown between districts in the preceding decade, while some Republicans sought to hold the 2011 elections under the previous maps while passing new maps and holding new elections in 2012. The judges ruled to conduct the elections under the previous decades' maps, agreeing that redistricting was not required to take place until 2012. After the 2011 elections, the newly Republican-controlled legislature passed new legislative maps, but elections were not held again until 2015.

==== New Jersey ====
In New Jersey, redistricting was controlled by a bipartisan commission evenly-split between Democrats and Republicans. The commission was unable to reach a compromise on the maps and deadlocked, forcing the Supreme Court of New Jersey to appoint an eleventh, nonpartisan commissioner. Commissioner Alan Rosenthal was unable to broker a compromise either, and he ultimately sided with the Democrats and voted for their proposal.

==== Virginia ====
In Virginia, Democrats controlled the Senate, while Republicans controlled the governorship and the General Assembly. To avoid a deadlock in the redistricting process, the leaders of both chambers reached a "gentleman's agreement" that the party in control of each chamber would draw their own maps without interfering with the others' map. Despite this, Republican governor Bob McDonnell vetoed the redistricting proposal, objecting to the Democratic-drawn Senate map. The legislature later passed a compromise bill, which McDonnell signed.

=== Other party switching ===
Total net change in legislative seats due to party switching in 2011: +1 Rep seat +5 Rep seats +6 Rep seats / +1 Dem seat

Like during the immediate aftermath of the 2010 election, a large number of Democratic state legislators, primarily from the South, switched to the Republican party. This included further switches in the Louisiana House of Representatives, which gave Republicans a true majority in the chamber, allowing them to bypass both the Democrats and the four independents in the chamber to pass legislation.

==== Pre-election ====
| State | Chamber | District | Legislator | Old party | New party | Source |
|---|---|---|---|---|---|---|
| Arkansas | House | 80 | Linda Collins | Democratic | Republican | |
| Kentucky | House | 37 | Wade Hurt | Republican | Democratic | |
| Louisiana | Senate | 18 | Jody Amedee | Democratic | Republican | |
| Louisiana | Senate | 20 | Norby Chabert | Democratic | Republican | |
| Louisiana | House | 19 | Charles Chaney | Democratic | Republican | |
| Louisiana | House | 22 | Billy Chandler | Democratic | Republican | |
| Louisiana | House | 48 | Taylor Barras | Democratic | Republican | |
| Mississippi | Senate | 47 | Ezell Lee | Democratic | Republican | |
| Mississippi | House | 14 | Margaret Rogers | Democratic | Republican | |
| Mississippi | House | 39 | Jeff Smith | Democratic | Republican | |
| Mississippi | House | 43 | Russ Nowell | Democratic | Republican | |
| North Carolina | House | 65 | Bert Jones | Independent | Republican | |

==== Post-election ====
| State | Chamber | District | Legislator | Old party | New party | Source |
|---|---|---|---|---|---|---|
| Mississippi | Senate | 9 | Gray Tollison | Democratic | Republican | |
| Mississippi | House | 21 | Donnie Bell | Democratic | Republican | |

== Summary table ==
Regularly scheduled elections were held in 8 of the 99 state legislative chambers in the United States. Nationwide, regularly scheduled elections were held for 578 of the 7,383 legislative seats. This table only covers regularly scheduled elections; additional special elections took place concurrently with these regularly scheduled elections.

| State | Upper House | | | | Lower House | | | |
| State | Seats up | Total | % up | Term | Seats up | Total | % up | Term |
|---|---|---|---|---|---|---|---|---|
| Louisiana | 39 | 39 | 100 | 4 | 105 | 105 | 100 | 4 |
| Mississippi | 52 | 52 | 100 | 4 | 122 | 122 | 100 | 4 |
| New Jersey | 40 | 40 | 100 | 2/4 (Note: The upper houses of Arkansas, Delaware, Florida, Hawaii, Illinois, Minnesota, New Jersey, and Texas use a 2-4-4 term length system.) | 80 | 80 | 100 | 2 |
| Virginia | 40 | 40 | 100 | 4 | 100 | 100 | 100 | 2 |

== Election predictions ==
Several sites and individuals publish predictions of competitive chambers. These predictions look at factors such as the strength of the party, the strength of the candidates, and the partisan leanings of the state. The predictions assign ratings to each chambers, with the rating indicating the predicted advantage that a party has in winning that election.

Most election predictors use:

- "Tossup": No advantage
- "Lean": Slight advantage
- "Likely": Significant, but surmountable, advantage
- "Safe": Near-certain chance of victory

| State | Chamber | Before election (Note: Many states up for election in 2011 had experienced heavy party switching in the year prior, which flipped control of both chambers of the Louisiana legislature and the Mississippi Senate.) | Ballotpedia Oct. 2011 | Result |
|---|---|---|---|---|
| Louisiana | Senate | R 22–17 | Likely R | R 24–15 |
| Louisiana | House of Representatives | R 57–46–2 | Safe R | R 58–45–2 |
| Mississippi | Senate | R 27–25 | Lean R | R 30–22 |
| Mississippi | House of Representatives | D 68–54 | Lean R (flip) | R 63–59 |
| New Jersey | Senate | D 24–16 | Lean D | D 24–16 |
| New Jersey | General Assembly | D 47–33 | Lean D | D 48–32 |
| Virginia | Senate | D 22–18 | Lean R (flip) | R 20–20 |
| Virginia | House of Delegates | R 59–39–2 | Safe R | R 67–32–1 |

== State summaries ==
=== Louisiana ===
Senate results

House of Representatives results

All seats of the Louisiana State Senate and the Louisiana House of Representatives were up for election to four-year terms in single-member districts. Republicans flipped both chambers through party switching and special elections in the past year, and then retained majority control in both chambers in the 2011 elections.

Louisiana State Senate
| Party | Before | After | Change |
|---|---|---|---|
| Republican | 22 | 24 | ▲2 |
| Democratic | 17 | 15 | ▼2 |
| Total | 39 | 39 | |

Louisiana House of Representatives
| Party | Before | After | Change |
|---|---|---|---|
| Republican | 57 | 58 | ▲1 |
| Democratic | 46 | 45 | ▼1 |
| Independent | 2 | 2 | Steady |
| Total | 105 | 105 | |

=== Mississippi ===
Senate results

House of Representatives results

All seats of the Mississippi State Senate and the Mississippi House of Representatives were up for election to four-year terms in single-member districts. Republicans won a majority in the lower house for the first time since Reconstruction. They had previously won a majority in the upper house through party switching and special elections earlier in the year, and then expanded their majority in the general election.

Shortly after the election, recently re-elected Democratic Senator Gray Tollison announced he was switching parties, giving the Republicans a three-fifths supermajority in the chamber. Republicans also gained a tenth seat in the House after the election when Donnie Bell announced he was switching parties as well.

Mississippi State Senate
| Party | Before | After | Change |
|---|---|---|---|
| Republican | 27 | 30 | ▲3 |
| Democratic | 25 | 22 | ▼3 |
| Total | 52 | 52 | |

Mississippi House of Representatives
| Party | Before | After | Change |
|---|---|---|---|
| Republican | 54 | 63 | ▲9 |
| Democratic | 68 | 59 | ▼9 |
| Total | 122 | 122 | |

=== New Jersey ===
Senate results

General Assembly results

All seats of the New Jersey Senate and the New Jersey General Assembly were up for election. In 2011, senators were elected to two-year terms in single-member districts, while Assembly members were elected to two-year terms in two-member districts. Democrats retained majority control in both chambers.

Senate
| Party | Before | After | Change |
|---|---|---|---|
| Democratic | 24 | 24 | Steady |
| Republican | 16 | 16 | Steady |
| Total | 40 | 40 | |

General Assembly
| Party | Before | After | Change |
|---|---|---|---|
| Democratic | 47 | 48 | ▲1 |
| Republican | 33 | 32 | ▼1 |
| Total | 80 | 80 | |

=== Virginia ===
Senate results

House of Delegates results

All seats of the Senate of Virginia and the Virginia House of Delegates were up for election in single-member districts. Senators were elected to four-year terms, while delegates serve terms of two years. Republicans maintained control of the lower chamber and won control of the upper chamber because the Republican lieutenant governor broke the ties in the now-evenly split body.

Senate of Virginia
| Party | Before | After | Change |
|---|---|---|---|
| Republican | 18 | 20 | ▲2 |
| Democratic | 22 | 20 | ▼2 |
| Total | 40 | 40 | |

Virginia House of Delegates
| Party | Before | After | Change |
|---|---|---|---|
| Republican | 59 | 67 | ▲8 |
| Independent | 2 | 1 | ▼1 |
| Democratic | 39 | 32 | ▼7 |
| Total | 100 | 100 | |

== Recall elections ==
=== Arizona ===
Arizona Senate President Russell Pearce faced a recall election over his role in the crafting and passage of the highly controversial Arizona SB 1070, which was the strictest anti-illegal immigration law in the country at the time of its passage. Pearce was the first legislator in Arizona history to face a recall election, and he was defeated by fellow Republican Jerry Lewis.

| District | | Incumbent | | | This race | |
| Chamber | No. | Member | Party | First elected | Result | Vote |
|---|---|---|---|---|---|---|
| Senate | 18 | Russell Pearce | Republican | 2008 | Incumbent recalled November 8, 2011. Republican hold. | ▌ ✓ Jerry Lewis (Rep.) 55.2%; ▌ Russell Pearce (Rep.) 43.6%; ▌ Olivia Cortes (Note: Cortes had withdrawn from the race but remained on the ballot.) (Rep.) 1.2% |

=== Wisconsin ===
Recall election results

A wave of recall elections were held in Wisconsin Senate as a part of the public fallout of the passage of Act 10, a law which significantly limited public employee collective bargaining. Republican senators were targeted for their support of the bill, while Democratic senators were targeted for leaving the state to deprive the chamber of a quorum to delay the bill's passage. Democrats retained all of their Senators, while two of the six Republicans were defeated, for a net gain of two seats for the Democrats.

| District | | Incumbent | | | This race | |
| Chamber | No. | Member | Party | First elected | Result | Vote |
|---|---|---|---|---|---|---|
| Senate | 02 | Robert Cowles | Republican | 1987 (special) | Incumbent retained August 9, 2011. Republican hold. | ▌ ✓ Robert Cowles (Rep.) 57%; ▌ Nancy J. Nusbaum (Dem.) 43% |
| Senate | 08 | Alberta Darling | Republican | 1990 | Incumbent retained August 9, 2011. Republican hold. | ▌ ✓ Alberta Darling (Rep.) 54%; ▌ Sandy Pasch (Dem.) 46% |
| Senate | 10 | Sheila Harsdorf | Republican | 2000 | Incumbent retained August 9, 2011. Republican hold. | ▌ ✓ Sheila Harsdorf (Rep.) 58%; ▌ Shelly Moore (Dem.) 42% |
| Senate | 12 | Jim Holperin | Democratic | 2008 | Incumbent retained August 16, 2011. Democratic hold. | ▌ ✓ Jim Holperin (Dem.) 55%; ▌ Kim Simac (Rep.) 45% |
| Senate | 14 | Luther Olsen | Republican | 2004 | Incumbent retained August 9, 2011. Republican hold. | ▌ ✓ Luther Olsen (Rep.) 52%; ▌ Fred Clark (Dem.) 48% |
| Senate | 18 | Randy Hopper | Republican | 2008 | Incumbent recalled August 9, 2011. Democratic gain. | ▌ ✓ Jessica King (Dem.) 51%; ▌ Randy Hopper (Rep.) 49% |
| Senate | 22 | Robert Wirch | Democratic | 1996 | Incumbent retained August 16, 2011. Democratic hold. | ▌ ✓ Robert Wirch (Dem.) 57%; ▌ Jonathan Steitz (Rep.) 43% |
| Senate | 30 | Dave Hansen | Democratic | 2000 | Incumbent retained July 19, 2011. Democratic hold. | ▌ ✓ Dave Hansen (Dem.) 67%; ▌ David VanderLeest (Rep.) 33% |
| Senate | 32 | Dan Kapanke | Republican | 2004 | Incumbent recalled August 9, 2011. Democratic gain. | ▌ ✓ Jennifer Shilling (Dem.) 55%; ▌ Dan Kapanke (Rep.) 45% |

== Special elections ==
Total net change in legislative seats due to special elections in 2011: +1 Rep seat +2 Rep seats / +1 Dem seat +3 Dem seats / +1 Ind seat

95 state legislative special elections were held in 2011, including the two that flipped control of the Louisiana Senate. Twelve seats changed partisan control, with Republicans netting three more seats than the Democrats.

=== Arkansas ===
| District | | Incumbent | | | This race | |
| Chamber | No. | Representative | Party | First elected | Results | Candidates |
|---|---|---|---|---|---|---|
| House | 24 | Rick Saunders | Democratic | 2004 (Note: Rick Saunders was term-limited during the 2010 election. Keith Crass, the Republican running to replace him, died before the election but was posthumously elected. Saunders was allowed to stay in office until the 2012 election as a result.) | Incumbent resigned after being allowed to stay in office past the end of his term due to the death of his successor. New member elected March 1, 2011. Republican gain. | ▌ ✓ Bruce Cozart (Republican) 60.4%; ▌Jerry Rephan (Democratic) 39.6% |
| House | 24 | Keith Crass✝ | Republican | 2010 | Incumbent resigned after being allowed to stay in office past the end of his term due to the death of his successor. New member elected March 1, 2011. Republican gain. | ▌ ✓ Bruce Cozart (Republican) 60.4%; ▌Jerry Rephan (Democratic) 39.6% |

=== Connecticut ===
| District | | Incumbent | | | This race | |
| Chamber | No. | Representative | Party | First elected | Results | Candidates |
|---|---|---|---|---|---|---|
| Senate | 13 | Thomas Gaffey | Democratic | 1994 | Incumbent resigned after pleading guilty to misusing public funds. New member elected February 22, 2011. Republican gain. | ▌ ✓ Len Suzio (Republican); ▌Thomas Bruenn (Democratic) |
| House | 101 | Deborah Heinrich | Democratic | 2004 | Incumbent resigned. New member elected February 22, 2011. Republican gain. | ▌ ✓ Noreen Kokoruda (Republican); ▌Joan Walker (Democratic) |

=== Massachusetts ===
| District | | Incumbent | | | This race | |
| Chamber | No. | Representative | Party | First elected | Results | Candidates |
|---|---|---|---|---|---|---|
| House | Worcester 6 | Geraldo Alicea | Democratic | 2006 | November 2010 election resulted in a tie. New election held May 10, 2011. Republican gain. | ▌ ✓ Peter Durant (Republican) 41.9%; ▌Geraldo Alicea (Democratic) 41.2%; ▌Peter Boria (Independent) 16.1%; ▌Robert Cirba (Independent) 0.9% |
| House | Bristol 12 | Stephen Canessa | Democratic | 2004 | Incumbent resigned June 24, 2011. New member elected September 20, 2011. Republican gain. | ▌ ✓ Keiko Orrall (Republican) 54.7%; ▌ Roger Brunelle Jr. (Democratic) 45.1% |

=== Missouri ===
| District | | Incumbent | | | This race | |
| Chamber | No. | Representative | Party | First elected | Results | Candidates |
|---|---|---|---|---|---|---|
| House | 83 | Jake Zimmerman | Democratic | 2006 | Incumbent resigned to become St. Louis County assessor. New election held November 8, 2011. Independent gain. | ▌ ✓ Tracy McCreery (Independent) 43.9%; ▌Jeff O'Connell (Democratic) 29.2%; ▌Patrick Brennan (Republican) 26.9% |

=== New Hampshire ===
| District | | Incumbent | | | This race | |
| Chamber | No. | Representative | Party | First elected | Results | Candidates |
|---|---|---|---|---|---|---|
| House | Hillsborough 4 | Bob Mead | Republican | 2008 | Incumbent resigned to serve as chief of staff to House Speaker William O'Brian. New member elected May 17, 2011. Democratic gain. | ▌ ✓ Jennifer Daler (Democratic) 58.2%; ▌Peter Kucmas (Republican) 41.8% |
| House | Strafford 3 | Martin Harty | Republican | 2010 | Incumbent resigned due to a scandal involving support of eugenics. New member elected August 9, 2011. Democratic gain. | ▌ ✓ Bob Perry (Democratic) 58.2%; ▌Honey Puterbaugh (Republican) 41.8% |
| House | Hillsborough 3 | Robert Huxley | Republican | 2010 | Incumbent resigned for personal reasons. New member elected September 20, 2011. Democratic gain. | ▌ ✓ Peter Leishman (Democratic) 60.5%; ▌David Simpson (Republican) 39.5% |

=== Wisconsin ===
| District | | Incumbent | | | This race | |
| Chamber | No. | Representative | Party | First elected | Results | Candidates |
|---|---|---|---|---|---|---|
| Assembly | 48 | Joe Parisi | Democratic | 2004 | Incumbent was elected Dane County Executive in a special election. New member elected August 9, 2011. Democratic hold. | ▌ ✓ Chris Taylor (Democratic) 93.5% |
| Assembly | 60 | Mark Gottlieb | Republican | 2002 | Incumbent resigned to join the Scott Walker administration. New member elected May 3, 2011. Republican hold. | ▌ ✓ Duey Stroebel (Republican) 75.6%; ▌Perry Duman (Democratic) 24.3% |
| Assembly | 83 | Scott Gunderson | Republican | 1994 | Incumbent resigned to join the Scott Walker administration. New member elected May 3, 2011. Republican hold. | ▌ ✓ Dave Craig (Republican) 74%; ▌James Brownlow (Democratic) 25.8% |
| Assembly | 94 | Michael Huebsch | Republican | 1994 | Incumbent resigned to join the Scott Walker administration. New member elected May 3, 2011. Democratic gain. | ▌ ✓ Steve Doyle (Democratic) 53.7%; ▌John Lautz (Republican) 46.3% |
| Assembly | 95 | Jennifer Shilling | Democratic | 2000 | Incumbent was elected to the State Senate in a recall election. New member elected November 8, 2011. Democratic hold. | ▌ ✓ Jill Billings (Democratic) 72.5%; ▌David A. Drewes (Republican) 27.4% |

== See also ==
- 2011 United States gubernatorial elections
