= Connecticut's 102nd House of Representatives district =

American legislative district

Connecticut's 102nd State House of Representatives district
Representative
Robin Comey; D

Connecticut's 102nd House of Representatives district elects one member of the Connecticut House of Representatives. It encompasses parts of Branford and has been represented by Democrat Robin Comey since 2019.

== List of representatives ==
List of Representatives from Connecticut's 102nd State House District
Representative	Party	Years	District home	Note
Thomas F. Kelly	Democratic	1967–1971	East Haven	Seat created
Thomas J. Giaimo	Democratic	1971–1972	East Haven	
V. William Farat	Republican	1972–1973	East Haven	Elected in a November 1972 special election to fill vacancy through January 3, 1973, when Ruth H. Clark, who won the simultaneous general election, took office
Ruth H. Clark	Republican	1973–1975	Branford	
Joseph J. Faricielli	Democratic	1975–1983	Branford	
Peggy Beckett-Rinker	Republican	1983–1987	Branford	
Stephen P. Hanchuruck	Democratic	1987–1991	Branford	
Joseph Giordano Jr.	Democratic	1991–1993	Branford	
Dominic Buonocore	Republican	1993–1997	Branford	
Peter J. Panaroni Jr.	Democratic	1997–2009	Branford	
Lonnie Reed	Democratic	2009–2019	Branford	
Robin Comey	Democratic	2019–	Branford	

== Recent elections ==
=== 2020 ===
2020 Connecticut State House of Representatives election, District 102
Party	Candidate	Votes	%
Democratic	Robin Comey (incumbent)	7,770	55.39
Republican	Marc Riccio	5,687	40.54
Working Families	Robin Comey (incumbent)	327	2.33
Independent Party	Marc Riccio	245	1.75
Total votes		14,029	100.00
Democratic hold			

=== 2018 ===
2018 Connecticut House of Representatives election, District 102
Party	Candidate	Votes	%
Democratic	Robin Comey	6,097	55.0
Republican	Robert Imperato	4,984	45.0
Total votes		11,081	100.00
Democratic hold			

=== 2016 ===
2016 Connecticut House of Representatives election, District 102
Party	Candidate	Votes	%
Democratic	Lonnie Reed (Incumbent)	6,878	57.58
Republican	Christopher Kelly	5,068	42.42
Total votes		11,946	100.00
Democratic hold			

=== 2014 ===
2014 Connecticut House of Representatives election, District 102
Party	Candidate	Votes	%
Democratic	Lonnie Reed (Incumbent)	4,417	53.3
Republican	Paul Cianci	3,623	43.8
Independent Party	Paul Cianci	241	2.9
Total votes		8,281	100.00
Democratic hold			

=== 2012 ===
2012 Connecticut House of Representatives election, District 102
Party	Candidate	Votes	%
Democratic	Lonnie Reed (Incumbent)	6,001	58.0
Republican	Lori Nicholson	4,352	42.0
Total votes		10,353	100.00
Democratic hold			
