= Linda Emmons =

American politician (1937–2015)

Member of the Connecticut House of Representatives from the 101st district
- In office 1977–1993
- Preceded by: Ernest C. Burnham Jr.
- Succeeded by: Peter Metz

Personal details
- Born: Linda Nye Pinkney; 1937 Paterson, New Jersey, U.S.
- Died: May 15, 2015 (aged 77–78)
- Party: Republican
- Spouse(s): Dick Emmons (m. 1958; div. 1975) Phil Costello (died 2007)
- Children: 2
- Education: Connecticut College (B.A.)

Linda Nye Emmons (1937 – May 15, 2015) was an American politician who served in the Connecticut House of Representatives from 1977 to 1993, representing the 101st district as a Republican.

== Personal life and education ==
Emmons was born Linda Nye Pinkney in 1937 in Paterson, New Jersey. She grew up in nearby Ridgewood and graduated from Ridgewood High School. She later studied at Centenary University, and at Connecticut College, where she earned a bachelor's degree in business accounting.

Emmons married her first husband, Dick Emmons, in 1958. They had two sons together and moved to Madison, Connecticut, in 1964. The couple divorced in 1975, and Emmons later married Phil Costello, with whom she remained until his death in 2007.

Emmons moved to Coeur d'Alene, Idaho, in 2012. She died on May 15, 2015.

== Political career ==
Emmons first became involved in politics in Madison, Connecticut, where she was a member of the Madison Charter Commission, the Board of Finance, and the Republican Town Committee.

Emmons was elected to the Connecticut House of Representatives in 1976, and she served eight terms representing the 101st district as a Republican. She was a ranking member of the Connecticut General Assembly's Finance, Revenue and Bonding Committee.
