= State Park Supply Yard =

- U.S. National Register of Historic Places
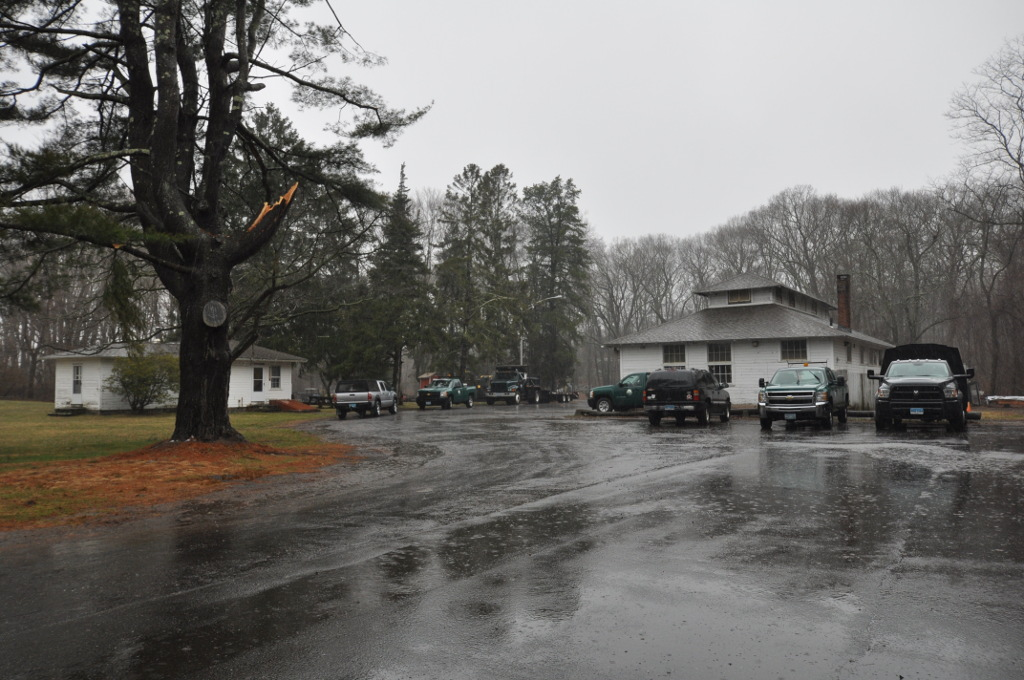

- Location within Connecticut Location within the United States
- Location: 51 Mill Road, Madison, Connecticut
- Coordinates: 41°16′37″N 72°33′39″W
- Area: 3 acres (1.2 ha)
- Built: 1933
- Built by: Civilian Conservation Corps
- MPS: Connecticut State Park and Forest Depression-Era Federal Work Relief Programs Structures TR
- NRHP reference No.: 86001757
- Added to NRHP: September 4, 1986

The State Park Supply Yard is a historic maintenance facility at 51 Mill Road in Madison, Connecticut. The facility buildings were built in 1933 - 1935 by crews of the Civilian Conservation Corps, and remain a well-preserved example of the Corps' work. Still used by the state, the facility was listed on the National Register of Historic Places in 1986.

== Description and history ==
The State Park Supply Yard is located in southeastern Madison, on the west side of Mill Road north of United States Route 1. It occupies about one-half of a 6-acre (2.4 ha) parcel of land that is a discontiguous portion of Hammonasset Beach State Park. The property's main feature is the barn, a large single-story wood frame structure with a hip roof that is topped by a hipped clerestory ridge. It has three garage door openings, one of which retains its original doors. Also included in the complex are an office building, pump house, supply shed, oil house, and workshop. One distinctive remnant of the period is a small frame structure which shelters a period concrete vault toilet.

The yard was built out by crews of the Civilian Conservation Corps in 1933-35 as a maintenance and supply yard for the state park system. It remained in this use until 1951, and was then repurposed by the state for other uses. At the time of its listing on the National Register of Historic Places in 1986, it was being used by the state health department's mosquito control program. It is the best-preserved of the state's early park maintenance yards.

== See also ==
- National Register of Historic Places listings in New Haven County, Connecticut
