= Madison Green =

Madison Green may refer to:

- Madison Green Historic District, the town green of the New England town of Madison, Connecticut
- Madison Green (New York City), a condominium apartment building in Manhattan, New York City
