= Connecticut's 101st House of Representatives district =

American legislative district

Connecticut's 101st State House of Representatives district
Representative
John-Michael Parker; D

Connecticut's 101st House of Representatives district elects one member of the Connecticut House of Representatives. It consists of the town of Madison as well as parts of Durham. It has been represented by Democrat John-Michael Parker since 2021.

== List of representatives ==
List of Representatives from Connecticut's 101st State House District
Representative	Party	Years	District home	Note
Arline Ryan	Republican	1967–1971	Branford	Seat created
Ruth H. Clark	Republican	1971–1973	Branford	
Ernest C. Burnham Jr.	Republican	1973–1977	Clinton	
Linda Emmons	Republican	1977–1993	Madison	
Peter Metz	Republican	1993–2005	Madison	
Deborah Heinrich	Democratic	2005–2011	Madison	Resigned
Noreen Kokoruda	Republican	2011–2021	Madison	Elected in special election
John-Michael Parker	Democratic	2021–	Madison	

== Recent elections ==
=== 2020 ===
2020 Connecticut State House of Representatives election, District 101
Party	Candidate	Votes	%
Democratic	John-Michael Parker	7,683	50.07
Republican	Noreen Kokoruda (incumbent)	7,102	46.29
Independent Party	John-Michael Parker	360	2.35
Working Families	John-Michael Parker	198	1.29
Total votes		15,343	100.00
Democratic gain from Republican			

=== 2018 ===
2018 Connecticut House of Representatives election, District 101
Party	Candidate	Votes	%
Republican	Noreen Kokoruda (Incumbent)	6,259	50.1
Democratic	John-Michael Parker	6,241	49.9
Total votes		12,500	100.00
Republican hold			

=== 2016 ===
2016 Connecticut House of Representatives election, District 101
Party	Candidate	Votes	%
Republican	Noreen Kokoruda (Incumbent)	10,180	100.00
Total votes		10,180	100.00
Republican hold			

=== 2014 ===
2014 Connecticut House of Representatives election, District 101
Party	Candidate	Votes	%
Republican	Noreen Kokoruda (Incumbent)	6,241	53.8
Democratic	Alex Taubes	5,329	43.3
Independent Party	Noreen Kokoruda (Incumbent)	289	2.9
Total votes		9,907	100.00
Republican hold			

=== 2012 ===
2012 Connecticut House of Representatives election, District 101
Party	Candidate	Votes	%
Republican	Noreen Kokoruda (Incumbent)	7,537	60.3
Democratic	David Dwyer	4,952	39.7
Total votes		12,489	100.00
Republican hold			
