= Shoreline Aviation =

American charter air carrier

IATA	ICAO	Call sign
none	SDB	SHORE AIR
- Founded: 1980; 46 years ago
- Ceased operations: April 1, 2020; 6 years ago
- AOC #: FVAA052E
- Hubs: Tweed New Haven Airport
- Fleet size: 10
- Destinations: 10 + Charter
- Headquarters: New Haven, CT
- Employees: 35
- Website: http://shorelineaviation.com/

Shoreline Aviation was a Part 135 charter air carrier based at the Tweed New Haven Airport in New Haven, Connecticut. It operated a fleet of ten Cessna 208 Caravan turboprop seaplanes. Shoreline operated on-demand air charter year-round in the northeast with a seasonal shift of resources to South Florida, the Bahamas, and the Caribbean in the winter.

== History ==
Shoreline Aviation, Inc. was founded in April 1980 by John Kelly and began operations at the former Griswold Airport in Madison, Connecticut. In 1981 the company began operating their first seaplanes. In 1987 Shoreline Aviation became the first commercial operator of the Cessna Caravan Amphibian. They have operated bases at many of Connecticut's airports and have recently returned their headquarters to Tweed New Haven Airport.

Shoreline Aviation was one of the first to enter and establish the market for a seaplane connection between lower Manhattan and the Hamptons. Shoreline has been called "The daddy of all seaplane companies" by the New York Business Journal. The New York Skyports Seaplane Base is now significantly busier with the entry of new companies such as Fly The Whale and, later, Blade Aqua.

In addition to operating scheduled shuttle flights between New York City's East River and East Hampton, Shoreline Aviation offers land and sea-based charters. In 2016 Shoreline announced it would begin offering flights from its base in New Haven to the East River marketed as "The Weekend New Yorker" service running seasonally June through Labor day.

Shoreline ceased operations on April 1, 2020. Cape Air bought most of the assets, then promptly liquidated personal and aircraft, deciding to no longer pursue seaplanes or the New York to Boston route. Former Shoreline employees and investors then purchased Fly the Whale to continue operations, and now operate out of Shoreline's hangar and facilities.

== Fleet ==
Type	number in service	seats
Cessna 208 Caravan (Amphibian/ Seaplane)	10	6-9

Most of Shoreline's Caravan fleet have been retrofitted with the Blackhawk Modifications Inc. XP140 engine conversion. This modification replaces the Caravan's stock 675 horsepower PT6a-114a engine with an 867-horsepower PT6a-140a engine. Blackhawk featured Shoreline in a video demonstrating their performance advantages.

== Destinations ==
=== Charter destinations ===
Shoreline offered on-demand charters to various airports and harbors throughout the Northeast and seasonally in South Florida, The Bahamas, and the Caribbean.

=== Summer shuttle flight destinations ===
- East Hampton, NY (HTO) - East Hampton Airport
- Montauk, NY (MTP) - Montauk Airport
- New Haven, CT (HVN) - Tweed New Haven Airport (Home Base)
- New York, NY (6N7) - New York Skyport Seaplane Base
- Shelter Island, NY - Sunset Beach
- Provincetown, MA - Provincetown Municipal Airport
- Fire Island, NY - The Pines at Fire Island

=== Winter shuttle flight destinations (Shoreline Caribbean) ===
- St. Croix, USVI (STX) - Henry E. Rohlsen Airport
- St.Thomas, USVI (STT) - Cyril E. King Airport
- Virgin Gorda, BVI - Off Airport: North Sound

== See also ==
- List of defunct airlines of the United States
