= Griswold Airport =

Griswold Airport (closed)
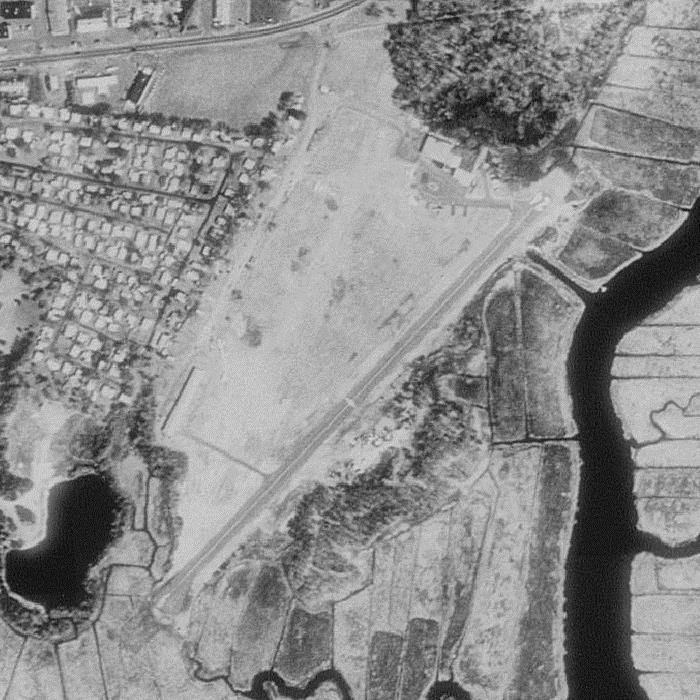
- USGS 1990 orthophoto
- IATA: ~~MPE~~; ICAO: none; FAA LID: ~~N04~~

Summary
- Airport type: Defunct
- Owner: Griswold Airport, Inc.
- Serves: Madison, Connecticut
- Opened: 1931
- Closed: January 1, 2007
- Elevation AMSL: 15 ft (4.6 m)
- Coordinates: 41°16′16″N 072°32′59″W

Map
- Interactive map of Griswold Airport (closed)

Runways
Direction	Length		Surface
Direction	ft	m	Surface
6/24	1,863	568	Asphalt

Statistics (2005)
- Aircraft operations: 3,000
- Source: Federal Aviation Administration

Griswold Airport (IATA: MPE, FAA LID: N04) was a public airport located three nautical miles (6 km) east of the central business district of Madison, a town in New Haven County, Connecticut, United States. It was privately owned by Griswold Airport, Inc. The airport has been closed since the beginning of 2007.

== History ==
Griswold Airport opened in 1931, located between Route 1 and the Hammonasset River, and adjacent to Hammonasset State Park.

In 1969, the Town of Madison paid to pave runway 6/24, in return for the owner's promise to maintain the property as an airport. The Madison Aviation Commission was formed at that time to oversee the town's interest in the property.

Shoreline Aviation was founded here in 1980, operating landplanes at first. They added floatplane operations the following year.

In 1985, the Griswold family offered to sell the airport to the town of Madison. In November 2000, Leyland Development Corporation obtained an option to purchase the land, and submitted plans for a 260-unit housing development, which was approved by the towns' Planning and Zoning Commission (PZC). A lawsuit against the town to stop the development failed, but local opposition was so strong that Leyland withdrew its original proposal. In the fall of 2003, the developer (renamed LeylandAlliance), submitted a revised proposal to build 131 units. In May 2004, the new proposal was approved by the PZC. LeylandAlliance completed the purchase in February 2007.

In January 2010, residents of the Town of Madison voted to buy 42-acre former airport property from the developer. Assisted by the Trust for Public Land, the town completed the purchase in May 2010 and in 2011 signed a conservation easement to permanently protect 20.6 acres of the land from development.

== Facilities and aircraft ==
Griswold Airport covered an area of 42 acres (17 ha). It contained one asphalt paved runway designated 6/24 which measured 1,863 by 50 feet (568 x 15 m).

There was also a turf runway designated 4/22, about 1,150 by 50 feet (350 x 15 m); (Note: This can be seen faintly on the USGS photo above. The turf runway was originally longer (see 1961 topo map on the Abandoned Airfields site), but after 6/24 was paved, the part south of the access road was no longer maintained.) and a seaplane ramp between the river and the northeast corner of the airport.

For the 12-month period ending December 31, 2005, the airport had 3,000 general aviation aircraft operations, an average of 57 per week.
