= Peggy Beckett-Rinker =

American politician (died 2025)

Member of the Connecticut House of Representatives from the 102nd district
- In office 1983–1987
- Preceded by: Joseph J. Faricielli
- Succeeded by: Stephen P. Hanchuruck

Personal details
- Born: 1943 or 1944
- Died: July 8, 2025 (aged 81)
- Party: Republican

Margaret "Peggy" Beckett-Rinker (died July 8, 2025) was an American politician who served in the Connecticut House of Representatives from 1983 to 1987, representing the 102nd district as a Republican. She later worked as executive director of the University of Connecticut's Professional Employees Association.
