= Clio Newton =

American artist

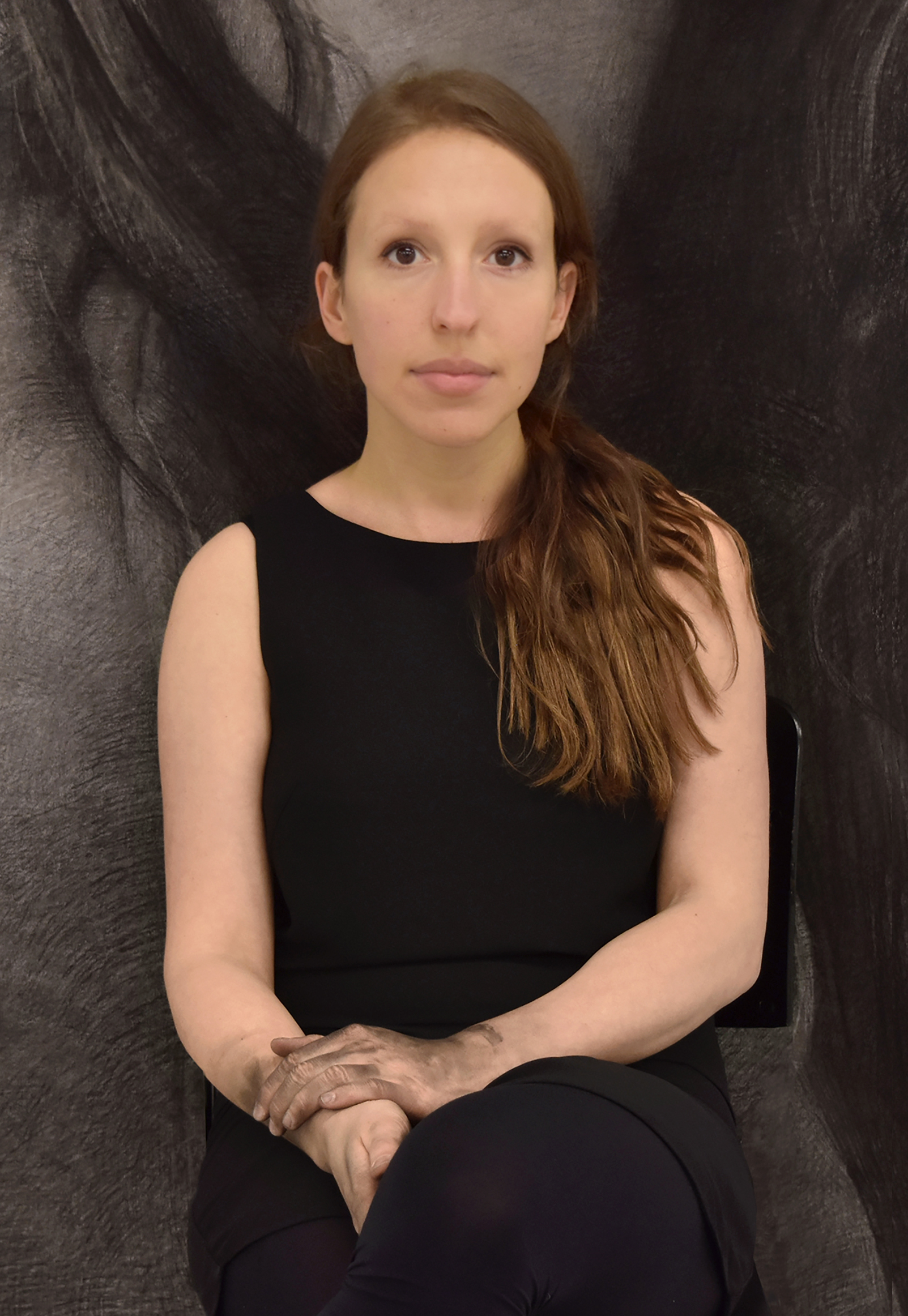
- Newton in her Zurich studio
- Born: 1989 (age 36–37); Madison, Connecticut, U.S.
- Education: Cooper Union (BFA), Zurich University of the Arts (MFA)
- Known for: drawing, painting

Clio Newton (born 1989) is an American artist known for her large-scale figurative drawings and paintings. Newton uses compressed charcoal, color pencil, and oil paint to depict her subjects, frequently women. Eliciting a sense that her figures "return the gaze", Newton exploits the size and realism of her pieces to invert the subject-viewer relationship. Her detailed investigations of form aim to probe the inner psychological states of her subjects. Frequently set against a monochromatic background or the stark white of paper, her figures are monumental, confident, and self-possessed, but reveal minimal information about their identities.

Newton typically concentrates on single portraits, working in series to examine a subject over time, or exploring individuals within a group. In 2018, she completed a series entitled "Bathers," which depicts women she met while swimming in Lake Zurich. Her debut solo exhibition, "Venus" (2019), at Forum Gallery in New York, explored historical representations of the body and gender in Western art.

Newton's works are included in the public collections of the Flint Institute of Arts in Michigan, the 21C Museum in Louisville, Kentucky, and the Baltimore Museum of Art.

== Personal life ==
Born in Madison, Connecticut, Newton was the second of five children. From an early age, she was influenced by her father, an artist, alongside whom she frequently painted and drew. Encouraged by her parents, she began formal training in figure drawing at the Lyme Academy of Fine Arts at the age of 12.

She moved from the United States to Switzerland after receiving the AKKU artist in residency grant in 2016.

== Education ==
Newton earned her Bachelor of Fine Arts from the Cooper Union in New York City and a Master of Fine Arts from the Zurich University of the Arts in Zurich, Switzerland. She has also studied at the Florence Academy of Art in Florence, Italy.

== Awards and recognitions ==
- The Elizabeth Greenshields Foundation Grant Award (2020, 2016, 2012)
- Jungkunst (2017)
- AKKU Kunstler Atelier Residency Grant Award, Uster, Switzerland
- Recognition in Buzzfeed's "100 Most Influential Contemporary Figurative Artists"
- Artagon Europe 45 Young Artists Award
- Florence Academy of Art Merit Scholarship (2013)
