= Ruth H. Clark =

American politician (1916–2022)

Member of the Connecticut House of Representatives from the 101st district
- In office 1971–1973
- Preceded by: Arline Ryan
- Succeeded by: Ernest C. Burnham Jr.

Member of the Connecticut House of Representatives from the 102nd district
- In office 1973–1975
- Preceded by: V. William Farat
- Succeeded by: Joseph J. Faricielli

Personal details
- Born: Ruth Hollingshead; 1916
- Died: April 20, 2022 (aged 105) Pompano Beach, Florida, U.S.
- Party: Republican
- Spouse: Harold Deming Clark Jr.
- Children: 3
- Education: Connecticut College

Ruth Hollingshead Clark (1916 – April 20, 2022) was an American politician who served in the Connecticut House of Representatives. A Republican, from 1971 to 1973, she represented the 101st district, and from 1973 to 1975, the 102nd district.

== Personal life and education ==
Ruth Hollingshead was born in 1916 and grew up in Montclair, New Jersey. She graduated from Connecticut College and married Harold Deming Clark Jr., with whom she moved to Branford, Connecticut, and had three children.

Clark moved to Pompano Beach, Florida, around 1994. She died there on April 20, 2022, at age 105.

== Political career ==
Clark began her political career in Branford, where she served on the board of education for eight years.

Clark was first elected to the Connecticut House of Representatives in 1970 and served one term representing the 101st district as a Republican. Connecticut redistricted before the 1972 election cycle, and when Clark ran for reelection, it was to the 102nd district, where she served one more term.

Clark ran for reelection to the 102nd district in 1974, but was narrowly defeated by Democratic candidate Joseph J. Faricielli by a margin of 41 votes.
