= Hammonasset Paper Mill Site =

Archaeological site in Connecticut, United States

- U.S. National Register of Historic Places
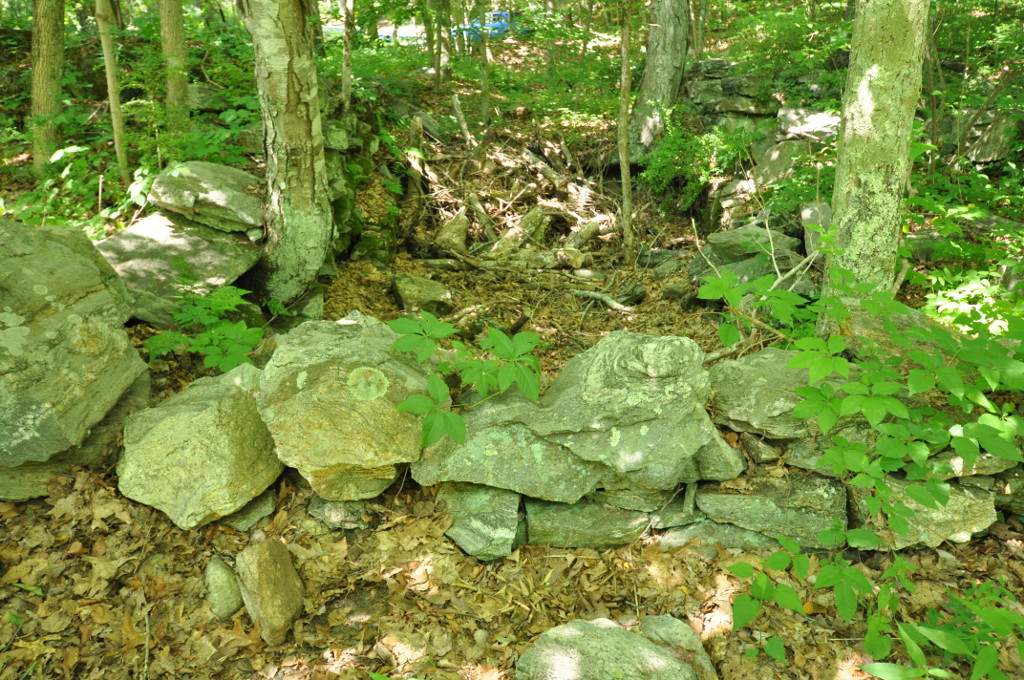

- Location within Connecticut Location within the United States
- Location: Green Hill Road at the Hammonasset River Killingworth and Madison, Connecticut
- Coordinates: 41°19′27″N 72°35′36″W
- Area: less than one acre
- Built: 1865
- NRHP reference No.: 96000128
- Added to NRHP: February 23, 1996

The Hammonasset Paper Mill Site is a historic industrial archaeological site off Green Hill Road in Killingworth and Madison, Connecticut. The site contains the remains of a paper mill built in 1865 and operated until 1890. The site, listed on the National Register of Historic Places in 1996, is owned by a local land trust, and is accessible by hiking trails.

The site has components located on either side of the Hammonasset River, which provided power for the mill's operation and serves as the town boundary between Madison and Killingworth. Surviving elements of the mill complex include the partial remains of a stone dam on the east side, and the stone mill foundation and raceways on the west side. The mill was built about 1890, and produced strawboard, a material used for boxes prior to the introduction of wood pulp-based paper. This endeavour lasted until 1890, and was followed for sometime by a lumber mill.

== See also ==
- National Register of Historic Places listings in Middlesex County, Connecticut
- National Register of Historic Places listings in New Haven County, Connecticut
