= Deacon John Grave House =

Historic house in Connecticut, United States

- U.S. Historic district – Contributing property
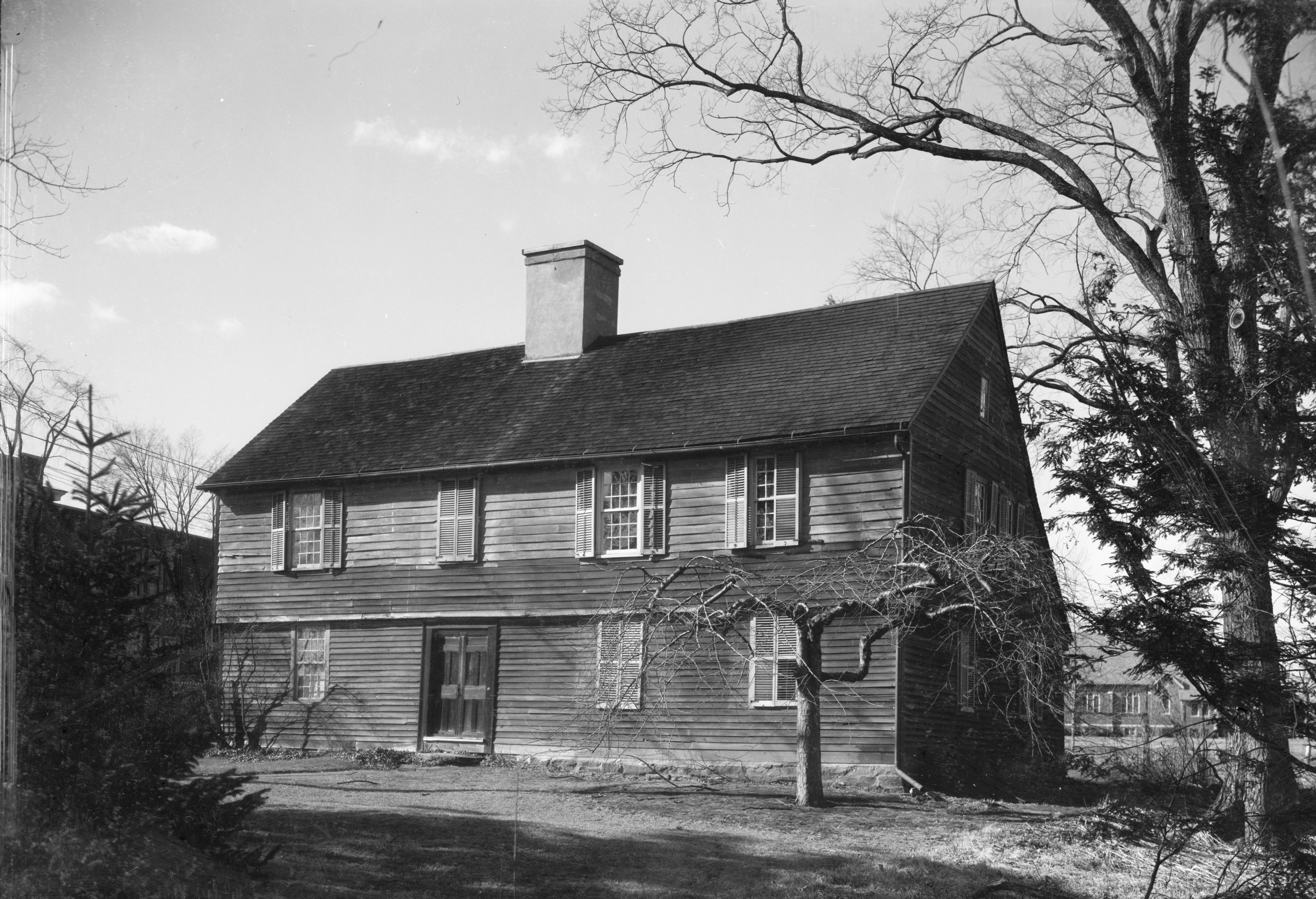

- Location within Connecticut Location within the United States
- Location: 581 Boston Post Road Madison, Connecticut
- Coordinates: 41°16′46″N 72°35′59″W
- Built: 1681
- Architectural style: Colonial
- Part of: Madison Green Historic District (ID82004353)
- Added to NRHP: June 28, 1982

The Deacon John Grave House, located at 581 Boston Post Road in Madison, Connecticut, is a saltbox house that was built by Deacon John Grave in 1681. The Grave family lived in the house for 300 years. The Deacon John Grave Foundation was formed in 1983 to save the house from demolition, and converted it into a museum.

== See also ==
- List of the oldest buildings in Connecticut
- Madison, Connecticut
