= Robin Comey =

American politician from Connecticut

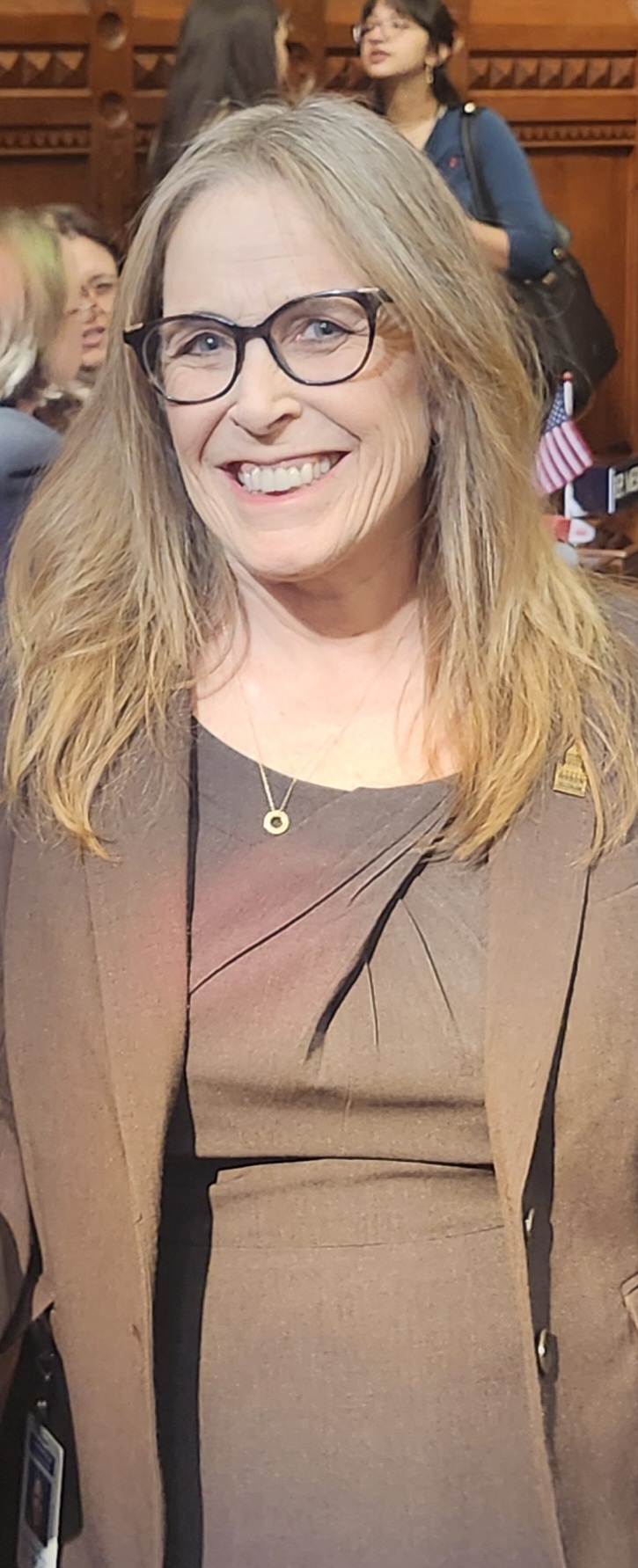

Member of the Connecticut House of Representatives from the 102nd district
- Incumbent
- Assumed office January 9, 2019
- Preceded by: Lonnie Reed

Personal details
- Born: September 16, 1967 (age 58) Minneapolis, Minnesota, U.S.
- Party: Democratic
- Spouse: David Steinman
- Education: Southern Connecticut State University (BA)
- Website: robincomey.com

Robin Elaine Comey (born September 16, 1967, in Minneapolis Minnesota) is an American politician who serves in the Connecticut House of Representatives representing the 102nd district in New Haven County. On March 16, 2023, Comey was arrested for DUI following a crash near the Connecticut State Capitol building.

== Political career ==
=== Election ===
Comey was elected in the general election on November 6, 2018, winning 55 percent of the Democratic Party vote over 45 percent of Republican candidate Robert Imperato.
