= Allis-Bushnell House =

Historic house in Connecticut, United States

- U.S. National Register of Historic Places
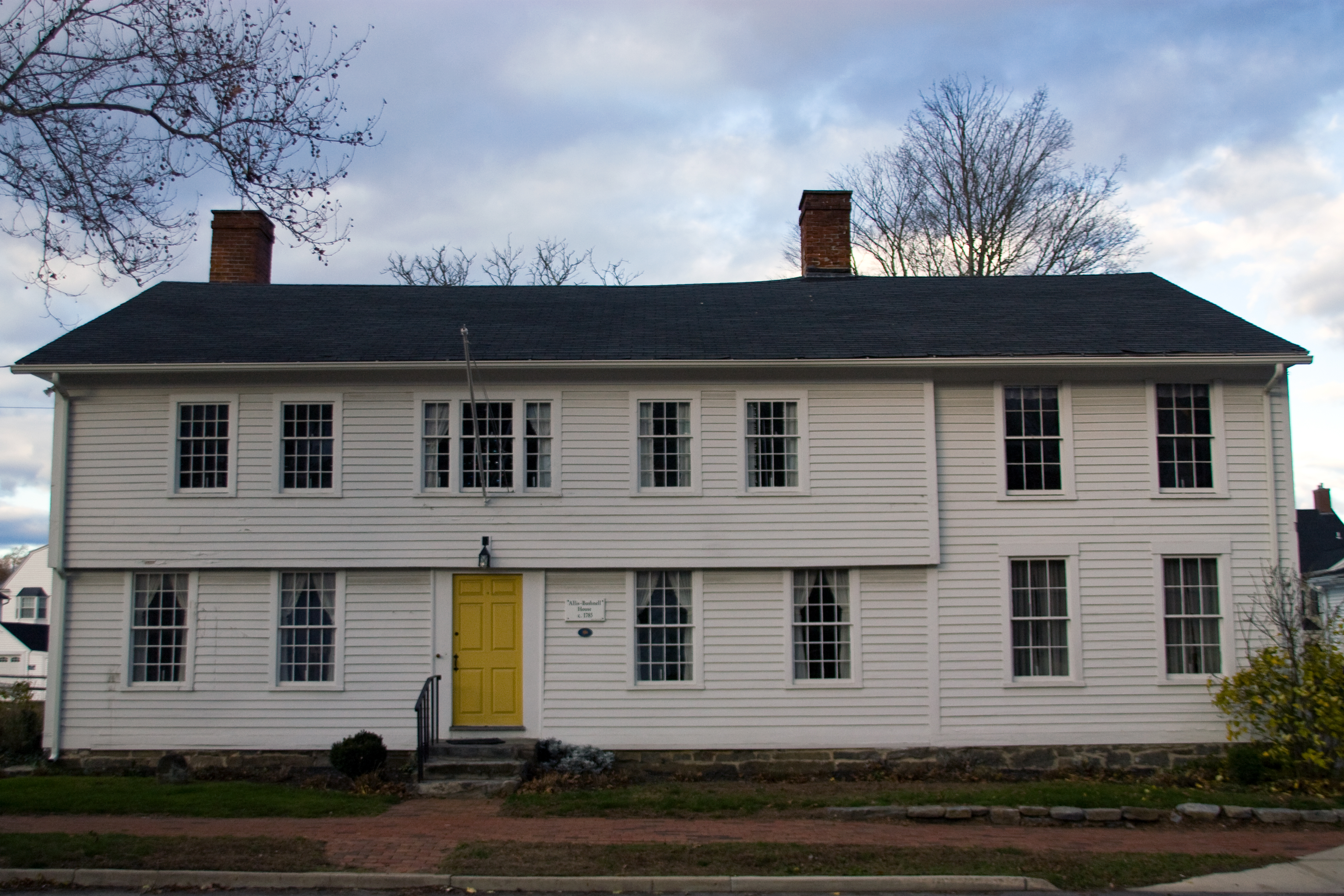

- Location within Connecticut Location within the United States
- Location: 853 Boston Post Road, Madison, Connecticut
- Coordinates: 41°16′46″N 72°35′31″W
- Area: 1 acre (0.40 ha)
- Built: 1785
- Architect: Aaron Blatchley
- NRHP reference No.: 82004352
- Added to NRHP: February 25, 1982

The Allis-Bushnell House is a historic house at 853 Boston Post Road U.S. Route 1 in Madison, Connecticut. It was built in 1785 and in 1982, was placed into the National Register of Historic Places. The house is owned by the Madison Historical Society and operated as a historic house museum.

In 1772, the 94.5-acre tract upon which the home stands was sold off to four individuals, which included Nathaniel Allis Sr. The tract was divided, and Allis received a portion including the site of the Allis-Bushnell House. Following more transfers, by 1774 David Landon and Samuel Brown were the owners of the property. Aaron Blatchley brought the land from Brown and Landon in 1785. The house was constructed as a 1 1/2-story building. It contained two sizeable rooms at the front with a smaller kitchen and bedroom behind. On the second floor, there were four small rooms. At an unknown point in the house's history, the roof was raised along the front facade to create a full second floor. The Victorian addition was likely added after the Civil War. The property was constructed from April 23, 1785 (upon the four acres being purchased by Blatchley) to December 16, 1789 (when Blatchy sold the "dwelling house").

In 1917, the Madison Historical Society rented the property for its collections and as somewhere to meet. On July 13, 1920, the organization purchased the property as well as 0.56 acres. Until 2010, the house was the Madison Historical Society's headquarters. The house can be accessed by members and the public for special events.

== See also ==
- National Register of Historic Places listings in New Haven County, Connecticut
