= John-Michael Parker =

American politician

Member of the Connecticut House of Representatives from the 101st district
- Incumbent
- Assumed office January 6, 2021
- Preceded by: Noreen Kokoruda

Personal details
- Born: 1988 (age 37–38) Madison, Connecticut, U.S.
- Party: Democratic
- Education: Yale University (BS)

John-Michael Parker (born 1988) is an American politician serving as a member of the Connecticut House of Representatives from 101st district. Elected in November 2020, he assumed office on January 6, 2021.

== Early life and education ==
Parker was born in Madison, Connecticut and graduated from Daniel Hand High School. He earned a Bachelor of Science degree in molecular, cellular, and developmental biology from Yale University in 2010.

== Career ==
After graduating from Yale, Parker worked as a science teacher at the Dalton School in Manhattan. He then joined The Future Project, a New York City-based non-profit, as the organization's national dream director and later VP for development. Since 2019, he has worked as the executive director of Arts for Learning Connecticut. Parker ran for the State House in the 101st district in 2018, however he was defeated by incumbent Noreen Kokoruda by 18 votes. He was elected to the Connecticut House of Representatives in November 2020, defeating Kokoruda, and assumed office on January 6, 2021. Parker served his first term in the House on the Public Health Committee, the Environment Committee, and the Education Committee. On November 8, 2022, Parker won re-election against Republican challenger John Rasimas. On February 7, 2024, he announced his intention to seek re-election for a second time.

== Electoral history ==
2018 Connecticut State House of Representatives election, District 101
Party	Candidate	Votes	%
Democratic	John-Michael Parker	6,241	49.93
Republican	Noreen Kokoruda (Incumbent)	6,009	48.07
Independent Party	Noreen Kokoruda (Incumbent)	250	2.00
Total votes		12,500	100.00
Republican hold			

2020 Connecticut State House of Representatives election, District 101
Party	Candidate	Votes	%
Democratic	John-Michael Parker	7,683	50.07
Republican	Noreen Kokoruda (Incumbent)	7,102	46.29
Independent Party	John-Michael Parker	360	2.35
Working Families	John-Michael Parker	198	1.29
Total votes		15,343	100.00
Democratic gain from Republican			

2022 Connecticut State House of Representatives election, District 101
Party	Candidate	Votes	%
Democratic	John-Michael Parker (Incumbent)	6,688	53.20
Republican	John Rasimas	5,589	44.45
Independent Party	John-Michael Parker	162	1.28
Working Families	John-Michael Parker	132	1.05
Total votes		12,571	100.00
Democratic hold			

2024 Connecticut State House of Representatives election, District 101
Party	Candidate	Votes	%
Democratic	John-Michael Parker (Incumbent)	6,836	57.61
Republican	Lisa Deane	4,708	39.68
Independent Party	John-Michael Parker	167	1.41
Working Families	John-Michael Parker	154	1.30
Total votes		11,865	100.00
Democratic hold			
