= Duo Dickinson =

American architect

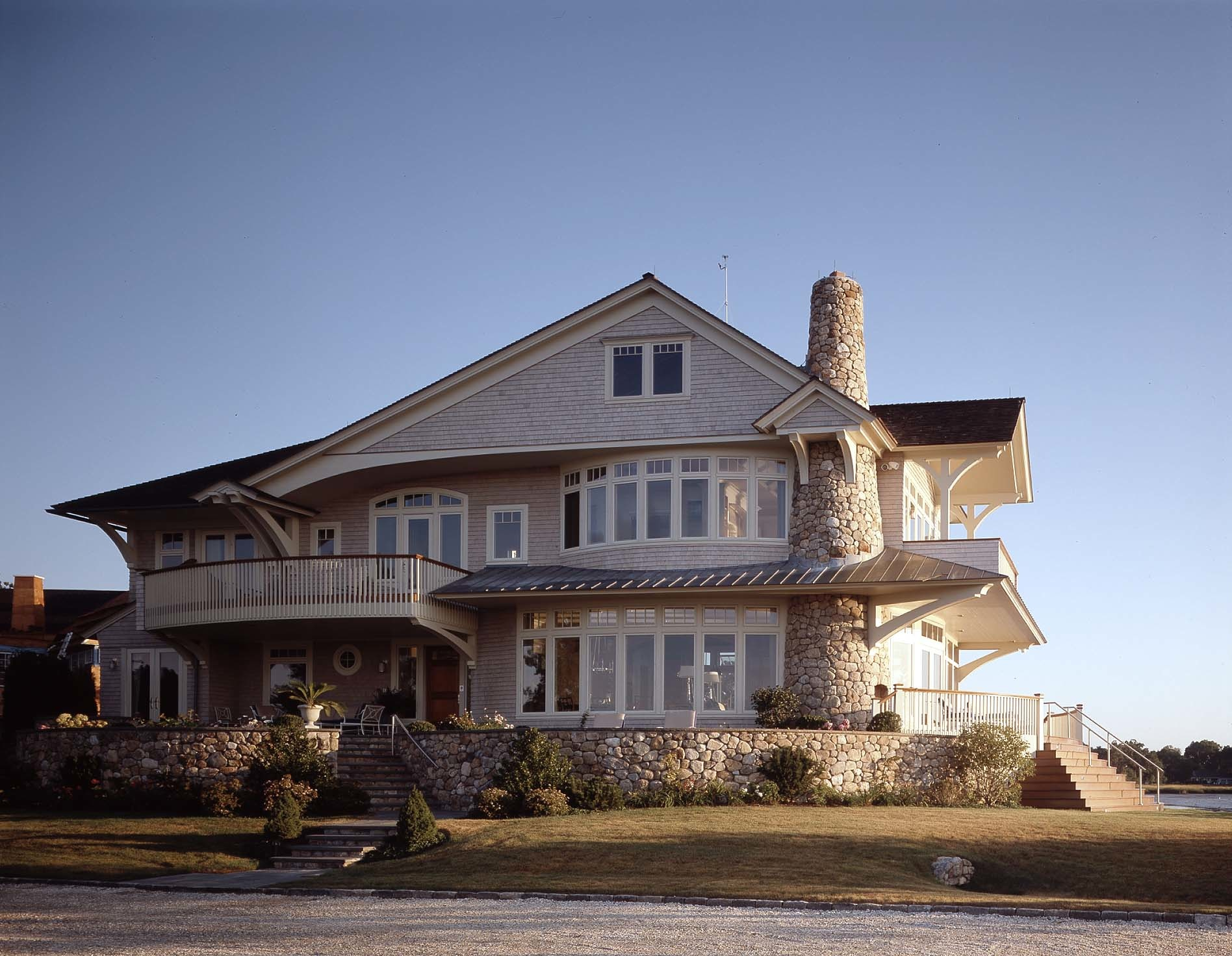
A house designed by Duo Dickinson

George A. "Duo" Dickinson, Jr. (born August 21, 1955) is an American architect. Based in Madison, Connecticut, he has built over 500 projects.

== Life and career ==
Dickinson graduated from Cornell in 1977 with a bachelor's degree in Architecture and opened his own architectural practice in 1987.

His work has received more than 30 awards, including the Architectural Record Record House, the Metropolitan Home Met Home Award, and the Connecticut and New York American Institute of Architects design awards. He is the first non-member award-winner of the Society of America Registered Architects' Special Service Award, and is the co-founder of The Congress of Residential Architecture (CORA), the first national organization of residential designers, which has grown to over 20 chapters and 1,000 members in seven years. Dickinson serves as the Knowledge Exchange Director for the Building Beauty American Advisory Board. In 2017, he was awarded the honor of Fellowship in AIA.

== Publications ==
As of fall of 2017, Dickinson has written six books.

Dickinson is a contributing writer for Mockingbird, Common Edge, and Hearst Publications. He is a contributing writer on home design for Money Magazine, the architecture and urban design critic for local newspaper New Haven Register, and contributing writer in home design for New Haven magazine and the Hartford Courant. Dickinson has written articles for multiple national publications including Residential Architect, Home, and Fine Homebuilding, and was a contributing writer for the "By Design" column for This Old House magazine.

Books

- 1985: Adding On, McGraw Hill ISBN 0070168083
- 1986: The Small House, McGraw Hill ISBN 0070168083
- 1990: Common Walls/Private Homes, McGraw Hill ISBN 0070168199
- 1994: Small Houses for the Next Century. McGraw Hill ISBN 0-07-016828-8
- 1996: Expressive Details: Materials, Selection, Use. McGraw Hill ISBN 0-07-016833-4
- 2004: The House You Build.Taunton Press ISBN 1-56158-616-1
- 2007: House on a Budget. Taunton Press ISBN 1-56158-923-3
- 2011: Staying Put: Remodel Your House to Get the Home You Want. Taunton Press ISBN 978-1-60085-364-7
- 2017: A Home Called New England Global Pequot Press ISBN 9781493018468

== Media ==
Dickinson was the co-host of the CNN/Money Magazine web series Home Work. He has co-hosted on a regional radio program, The Real Life Survival Guide, which began airing in 2011. He has appeared on a variety of national media platforms, including Heritage Radio Network's Burning Down the House, CNN's Open House, NPR's Studio 360, and Fox's Weekend Marketplace. He hosts a monthly radio show, Home Page, on WPKN.
