= Madison Green Historic District =

Historic district in Connecticut, United States

- U.S. National Register of Historic Places
- U.S. Historic district
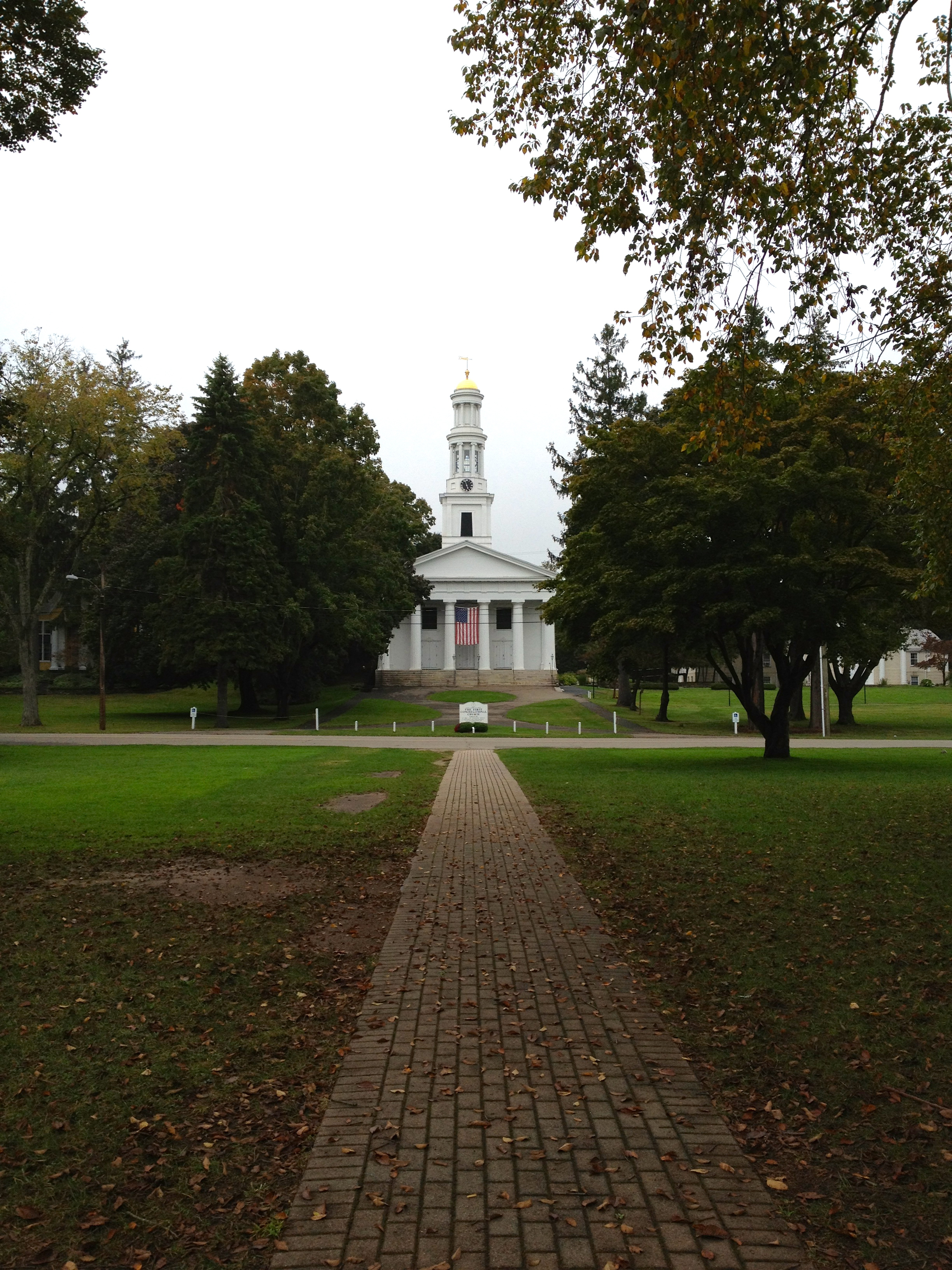
- View of the green and the congregational church

- Location within Connecticut Location within the United States
- Location: 446-589 Boston Post Road U.S. Route 1 and structures surrounding the green, Madison, Connecticut
- Coordinates: 41°16′41″N 72°36′19″W
- Area: 40 acres (16 ha)
- Built: 1641
- Architect: Multiple
- Architectural style: Greek Revival, Italianate, Georgian
- NRHP reference No.: 82004353
- Added to NRHP: June 28, 1982

Madison Green is the town green of the New England town of Madison, Connecticut. The green is the centerpiece of the Madison Green Historic District, and is located just West of the commercial strip of Madison on U.S. Route 1. The Green is bounded on the south by U.S. Route 1, Meeting House Lane on the East and North, and Copse Road on the West. Surrounding the green are several buildings, most prominent being the First Congregational Church (built in 1838), which owns the green. Other buildings around the green include Memorial Hall (1896), a community meeting building (c. 1884), Academy Elementary School (1884), and Lee Academy (1821), as well as many historic houses.

In the southeast corner are three war memorials. They include a large boulder with a bronze plaque honoring veterans who fought in World War One, a large grey cut stone with a bronze plaque remembering those who fought in World War Two, Korea and Vietnam, and a smaller boulder with a bronze plaque remembering the Revolutionary War. A flagpole is located in the center. Across the Boston Post Road is a row of 18th- and 19th-century houses. The oldest house in Madison, the Deacon John Grave House (1681), is just east of the green.

The green was established in 1705, when the area became the site of a meeting house for the newly authorized East Guilford parish (the area then being part of Guilford). From this beginning it grew as a village center, which became the town center when Madison was incorporated in 1826. The historic district was listed on the National Register of Historic Places in 1982 and includes the green and

== See also ==
- National Register of Historic Places listings in New Haven County, Connecticut
