= Lonnie Reed =

American politician

Member of the Connecticut House of Representatives from the 102nd district
- In office January 7, 2009 – January 9, 2019
- Preceded by: Peter J. Panaroni Jr.
- Succeeded by: Robin Comey

Personal details
- Born: January 30, 1945 (age 81) Branford, Connecticut
- Party: Democratic

Lonnie Reed (born January 30, 1945) is an American politician who served in the Connecticut House of Representatives from the 102nd district from 2009 to 2019.
