= Peter J. Panaroni Jr. =

American politician

Member of the Connecticut House of Representatives from the 102nd district
- In office January 8, 1997 – January 7, 2009
- Preceded by: Dominic Buonocore
- Succeeded by: Lonnie Reed

Personal details
- Party: Democratic

Peter J. Panaroni Jr. is an American politician who served in the Connecticut House of Representatives from the 102nd district from 1997 to 2009.
