= Martin Harty =

American politician

Member of the New Hampshire House of Representatives from the Strafford 3 district
- In office December 1, 2010 – March 14, 2011

Personal details
- Born: March 25, 1919 Barre, Massachusetts
- Died: August 12, 2017 (aged 98) Dover, New Hampshire
- Party: Republican

Martin C. Harty (March 25, 1919 – August 12, 2017) was an American politician who was a member of the New Hampshire House of Representatives from 2010 to early 2011. A Republican, he was one of eight legislators who represent Strafford County District 3, comprising the towns of Barrington, Farmington, Middleton, Milton, New Durham, and Strafford.

In March 2011, as a freshman State Representative, Harty promoted eugenics in a conversation with the manager of a community health program stating:

"I'm sorry I don't agree with your side. I and several of us in the state house believe in eugenics...I think the world is too populated. So we believe that there is too many defective people...You know the mentally ill, the retarded, people with physical disabilities and drug addictions - the defective people society would be better off with out. I wish we had a Siberia so we could ship them all off to freeze to death and die and clean up the population. If you women didn't try to give yourself abortions, you wouldn't end up with defective children".

He subsequently resigned, effective March 15, 2011. Harty was 91 at the time of his resignation. He died in August 2017 at the age of 98.
