= Deborah Heinrich =

American politician (born 1969)

Member of the Connecticut House of Representatives from the 101st district
- In office January 5, 2005 – January 5, 2011
- Preceded by: Peter Metz
- Succeeded by: Noreen Kokoruda

Personal details
- Born: January 11, 1969 (age 57) Aberdeen, Maryland, U.S.
- Party: Democratic

Deborah Heinrich (born January 11, 1969) is an American politician who served in the Connecticut House of Representatives from the 101st district from 2005 to 2011.
