= Dominic Buonocore =

American politician

Member of the Connecticut House of Representatives from the 102nd district
- In office January 6, 1993 – January 8, 1997
- Preceded by: Joseph Giordano Jr.
- Succeeded by: Peter J. Panaroni Jr.

Personal details
- Born: May 5, 1930 New Haven, Connecticut
- Died: October 17, 2011 (aged 81) Branford, Connecticut
- Party: Republican

Dominic Buonocore (May 5, 1930 – October 17, 2011) was an American politician who served in the Connecticut House of Representatives from the 102nd district from 1993 to 1997.

He died on October 17, 2011, in Branford, Connecticut at age 81.
