= Noreen Kokoruda =

American politician (1947–2022)

Member of the Connecticut House of Representatives from the 101st district
- In office February 25, 2011 – January 6, 2021
- Preceded by: Deborah Heinrich
- Succeeded by: John-Michael Parker

Personal details
- Born: August 4, 1947 Bridgeport, Connecticut, U.S.
- Died: December 21, 2022 (aged 75) Madison, Connecticut, U.S.
- Party: Republican

Noreen Kokoruda (August 4, 1947 – December 21, 2022) was an American politician who served in the Connecticut House of Representatives from the 101st district from 2011 to 2021. She lost re-election to Democratic challenger John-Michael Parker in 2020 after narrowly defeating him in 2018.

== Electoral history ==
=== 2006 ===
2006 Connecticut State House of Representatives Election, District 101
Party	Candidate	Votes	%
Democratic	Deborah Heinrich (incumbent)	5,919	59.81
Republican	Noreen Kokoruda	3,978	40.19
Total votes		9,897	100.00
Democratic hold			

=== 2011 ===
2011 Connecticut State House of Representatives Special Election, District 101
Party	Candidate	Votes	%
Republican	Noreen Kokoruda	2,119	58.23
Democratic	Joan Walker	1,520	41.77
Total votes		3,639	100.00
Republican gain from Democratic			

=== 2012 ===
2012 Connecticut State House of Representatives Election, District 101
Party	Candidate	Votes	%
Republican	Noreen Kokoruda (incumbent)	7,537	60.35
Democratic	David Dwyer	4,952	39.65
Total votes		12,489	100.00
Republican hold			

=== 2014 ===
2014 Connecticut State House of Representatives Election, District 101
Party	Candidate	Votes	%
Republican	Noreen Kokoruda (incumbent)	5,329	53.79
Democratic	Alex Taubes	4,289	43.29
Independent Party	Noreen Kokoruda (incumbent)	289	2.92
Total votes		9,907	100.00
Republican hold			

=== 2016 ===
2016 Connecticut State House of Representatives Election, District 101
Party	Candidate	Votes	%
Republican	Noreen Kokoruda (incumbent)	8,832	86.76
Independent Party	Noreen Kokoruda (incumbent)	1,348	13.24
Total votes		10,180	100.00
Republican hold			

=== 2018 ===
2018 Connecticut State House of Representatives Election, District 101
Party	Candidate	Votes	%
Democratic	John-Michael Parker	6,241	49.93
Republican	Noreen Kokoruda (Incumbent)	6,009	48.07
Independent Party	Noreen Kokoruda (Incumbent)	250	2.00
Total votes		12,500	100.00
Republican hold			

=== 2020 ===
2020 Connecticut State House of Representatives Election, District 101
Party	Candidate	Votes	%
Democratic	John-Michael Parker	7,683	50.07
Republican	Noreen Kokoruda (Incumbent)	7,102	46.29
Independent Party	John-Michael Parker	360	2.35
Working Families	John-Michael Parker	198	1.29
Total votes		15,343	100.00
Democratic gain from Republican			
