= Russ Nowell =

Mississippi politician

Russ C. Nowell (born March 11, 1972) is a former politician in Mississippi who served in the Mississippi House of Representatives from 2008 to 2012. He switched from being a Democrat to being a Republican in 2011. He represented District 43. Democrat Michael Evans defeated him in a narrow November 2011 election.

Nowell graduated from Mississippi State University with a B.A. degree. He is president of Southern Security Life. He is married and has a child.
