= Hammonasset Beach State Park =

Park in Connecticut, United States

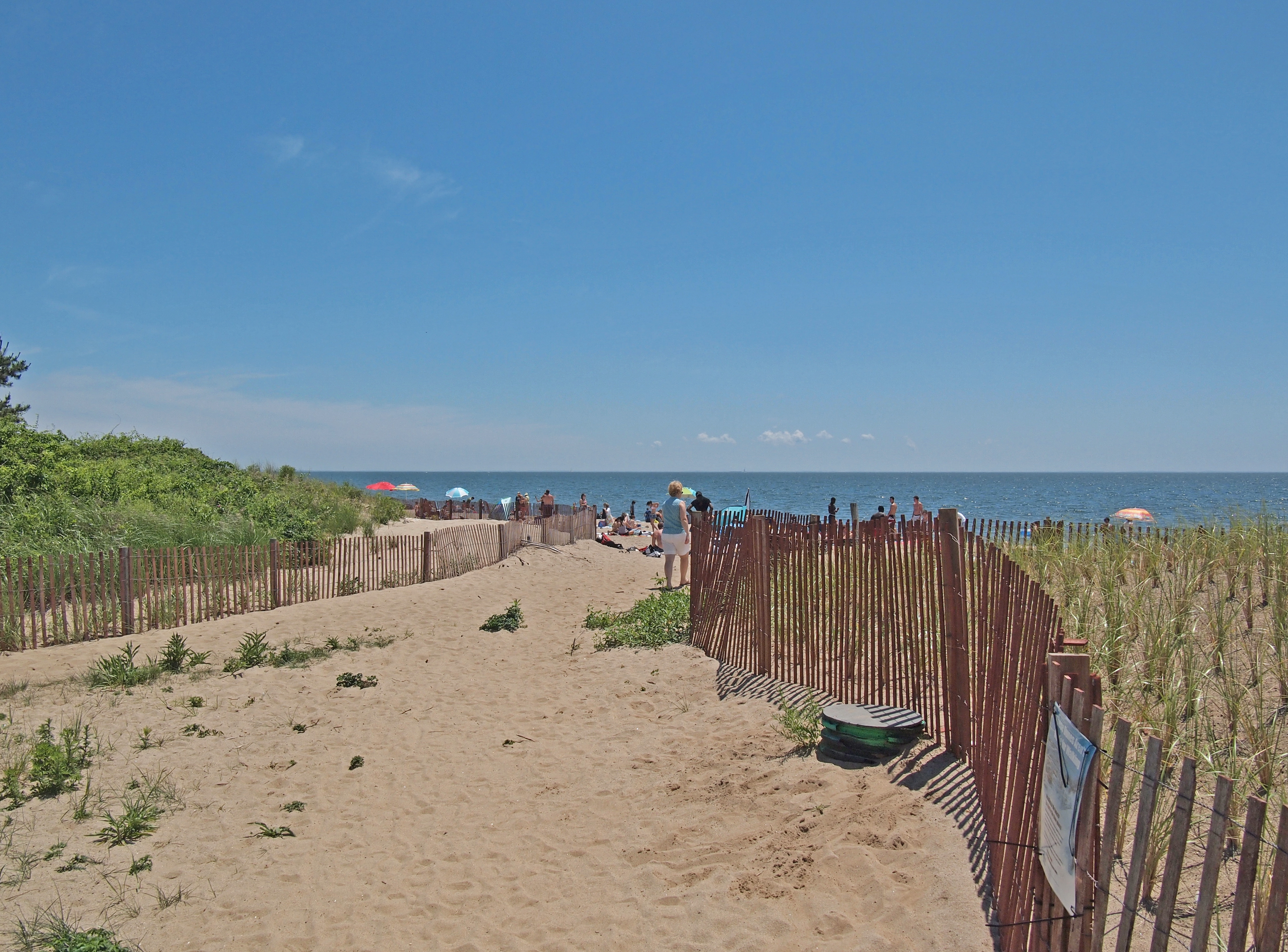

- Location within Connecticut Location within the United States
- Location: Madison, Connecticut, United States
- Coordinates: 41°15′28″N 72°33′21″W
- Area: 936 acres (379 ha)
- Elevation: 0 ft (0 m)
- Established: 1919
- Administrator: Connecticut Department of Energy and Environmental Protection
- Designation: Connecticut state park
- Website: Official website

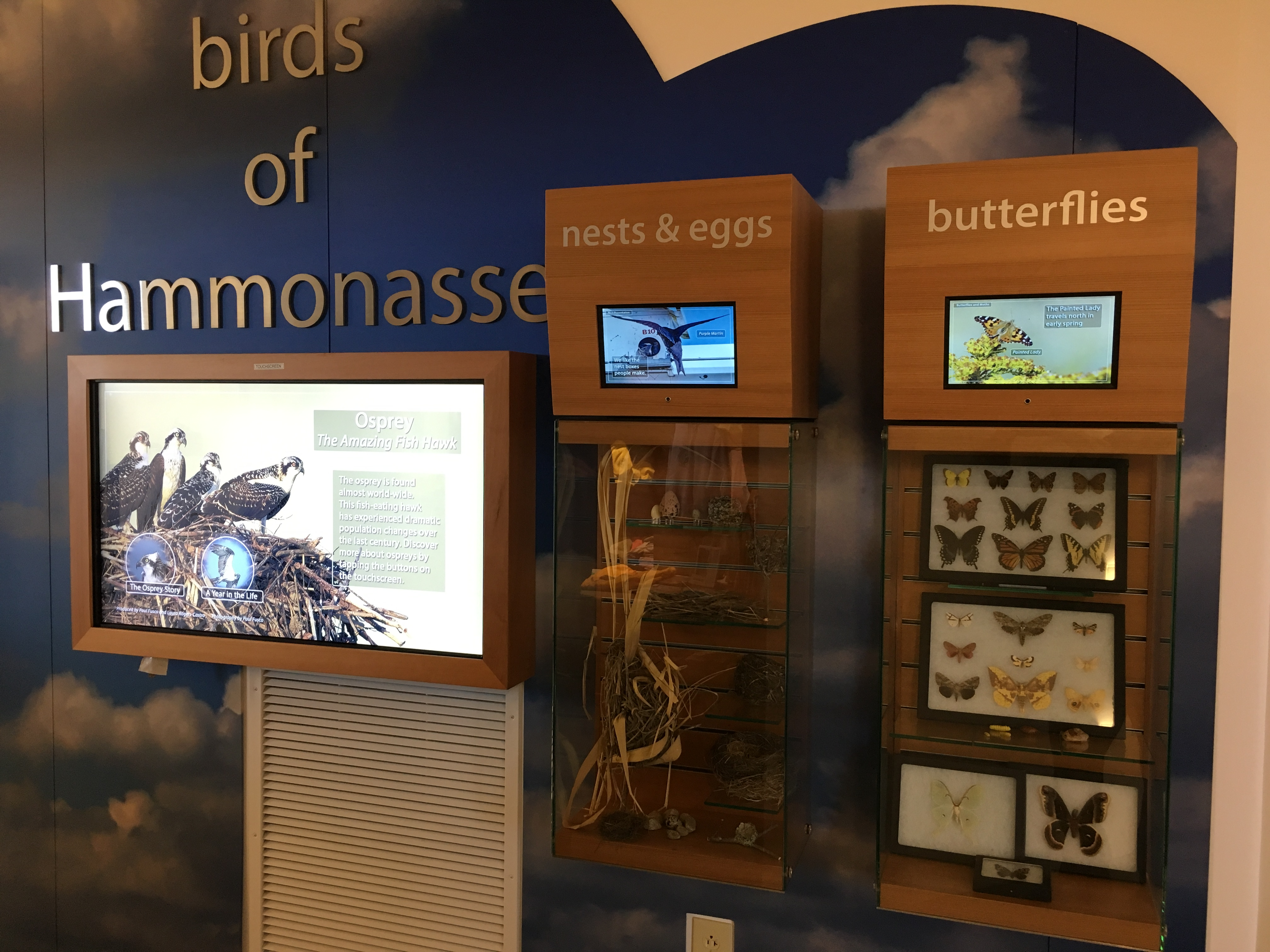
Nature center exhibit

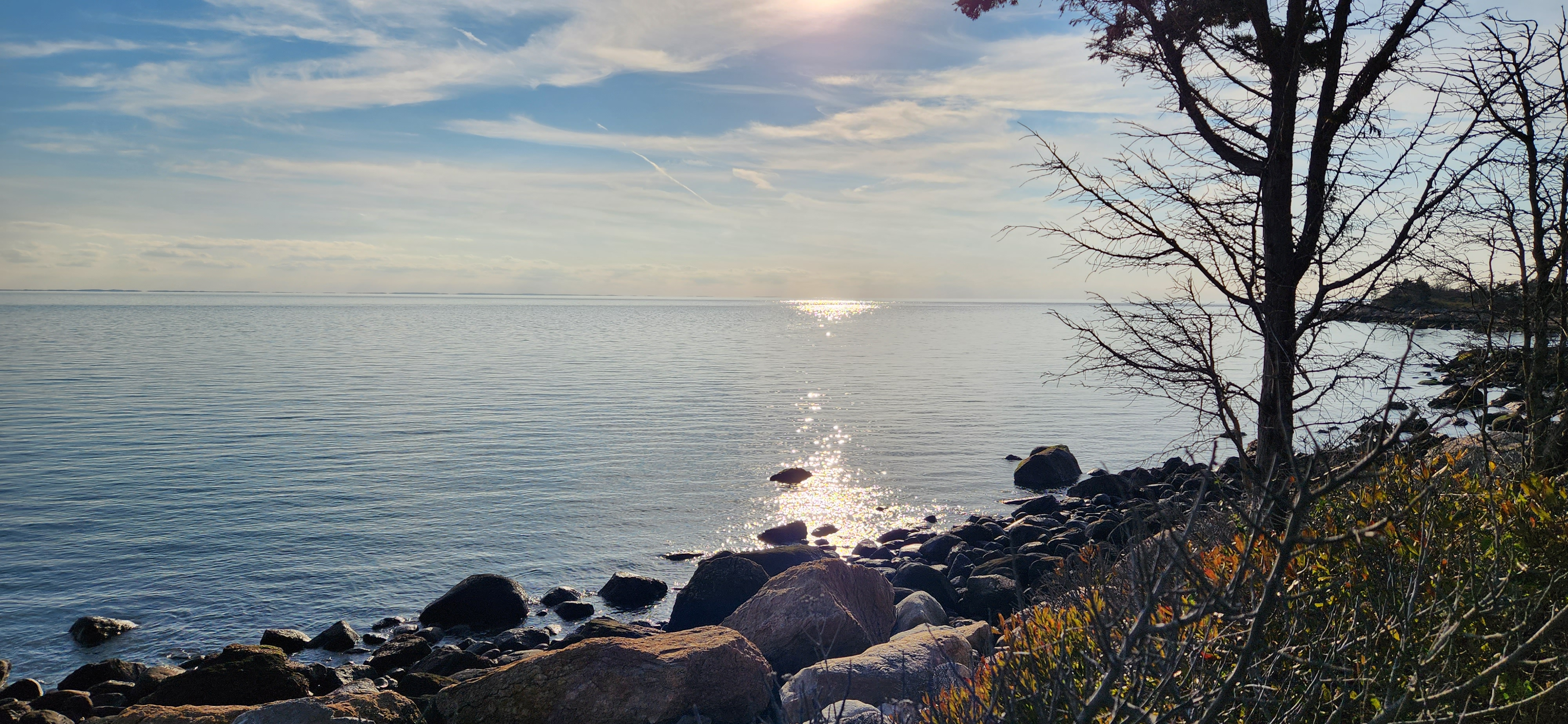
Long Island Sound seen from Meigs Point at Hammonassett Beach

Hammonasset Beach State Park is a public recreation area occupying two miles of beach front on Long Island Sound in the town of Madison, Connecticut, United States. It is Connecticut's largest shoreline park and one of the state's most popular attractions, drawing an estimated one million visitors annually. (Note: The most popular Connecticut attractions are the casinos in Uncasville and Mashantucket, which draw an estimated seven million and eight million visitors annually.) The state park offers beach activities, large campground, and nature center. It is managed by the Connecticut Department of Energy and Environmental Protection.

== History ==
The park began with the purchase of 499 acres in 1919. The park drew over 75,000 visitors in 1920, its first year of operation, a figure that grew to nearly 450,000 by its fifth year of operation, 1924. In 2013, it accounted for over one-quarter of statewide park attendance and over one-third of the revenue generated statewide by the state park system. Officials estimate annual attendance at one million visitors.

The park closed during World War II when the site became a U.S. Army reservation and active aircraft firing range. In 1955, a stone breakwater was built at the Meigs Point end of the park.

== Nature center ==
A new Meigs Point Nature Center was opened in 2016 to replace the center's original farmhouse site that had been in use for more than 40 years. The facility offers 4,000 square feet (370 m^{2}) of exhibit space with observation deck and hands-on learning experiences. Exhibits feature a touch tank and live turtles, snakes, amphibians, crabs and fish.

== Activities and amenities ==
The park offers bicycling, boating, fishing, hiking, picnicking, and swimming as well as a campground with 550 units.
