= Madison, Connecticut =

- Town
- Town of Madison
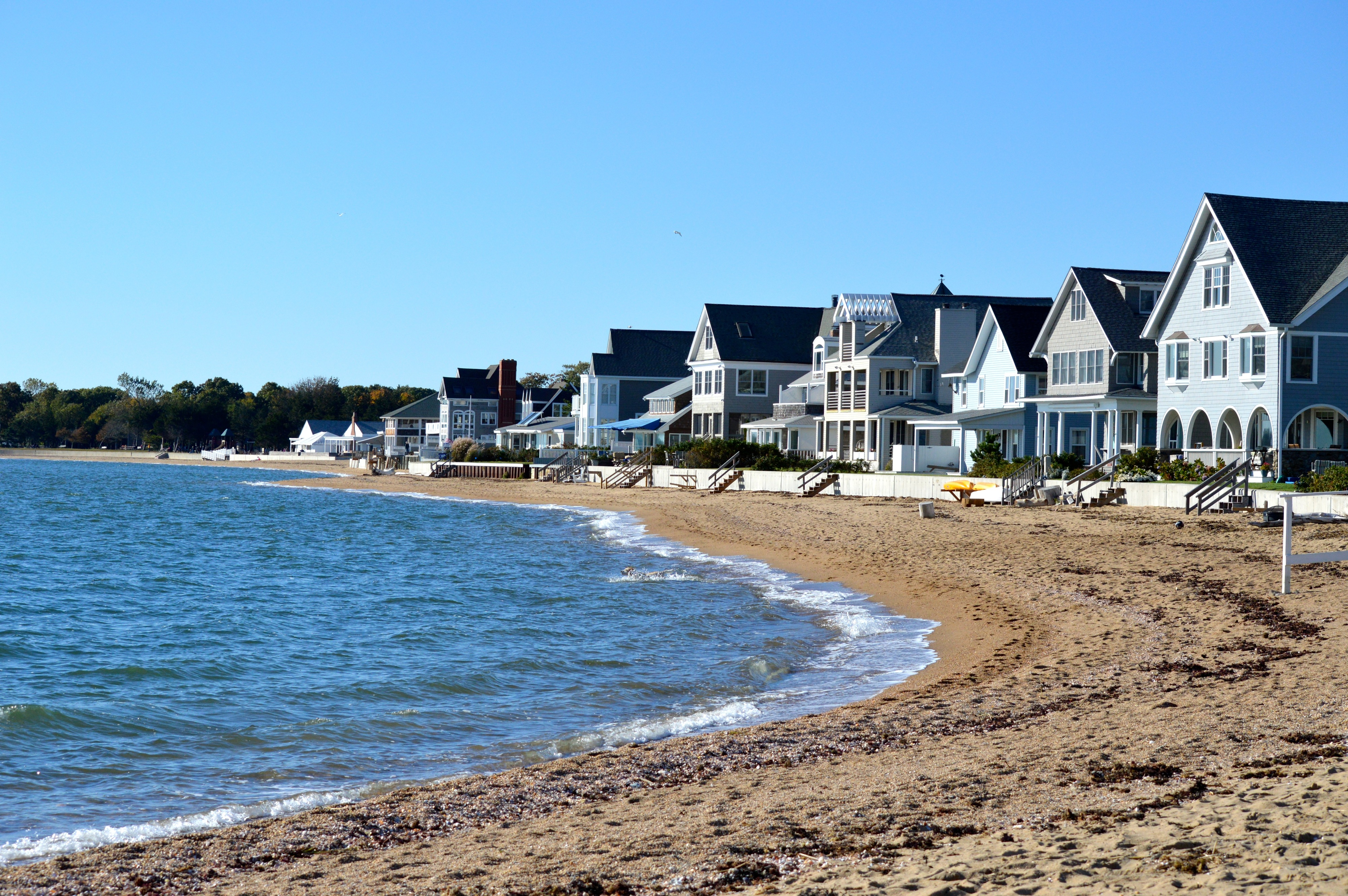
- Waterfront in Madison

- Seal
- Interactive map of Madison, Connecticut
- Coordinates: 41°16′45″N 72°35′45″W
- Country: United States
- U.S. state: Connecticut
- County: New Haven
- Region: South Central CT
- Incorporated: 1826

Government
  - Type: Selectman-town meeting
  - First Selectman: Peggy Lyons (D)
  - Selectman: Bruce Wilson (R)
  - Selectman: Jennifer Gordon (R)
  - Selectman: Al Goldberg (D)
  - Selectman: Scott Murphy (D)

Area
  - Total: 36.8 sq mi (95.3 km^{2})
  - Land: 36.2 sq mi (93.8 km^{2})
  - Water: 0.58 sq mi (1.5 km^{2})
- Elevation: 223 ft (68 m)

Population (2020)
  - Total: 17,691
  - Density: 488/sq mi (189/km^{2})
- Time zone: UTC−5 (Eastern)
  - Summer (DST): UTC−4 (Eastern)
- ZIP code: 06443
- Area codes: 203/475
- FIPS code: 09-44560
- GNIS feature ID: 0213454
- Website: www.madisonct.org

Madison is a town in the southeastern corner of New Haven County, Connecticut, United States, occupying a central location on Connecticut's Long Island Sound shoreline. The town is part of the South Central Connecticut Planning Region. The population was 17,691 at the 2020 census.

== History ==
Madison was first settled in 1641. Throughout the 18th century, Madison was known as East Guilford until it was incorporated as a town in 1826. It is presently named after James Madison, 4th President of the United States.

From 1935 to 1942, Madison served as the site of Camp Hadley, one of 23 Civilian Conservation Corps (CCC) camps in Connecticut.

== Geography ==
According to the United States Census Bureau, the town has a total area of 36.8 square miles (95.3 km^{2}), of which 36.2 square miles (93.8 km^{2}) is land and 0.6 square miles (1.5 km^{2}), or 1.6%, is water. Madison is bordered by the municipalities of Clinton and Killingworth to the east, Durham to the north, Guilford to the west, and Long Island Sound to the south.

=== Principal communities ===
- East River
- Hammonasset Point
- Madison Center - a census-designated place, with a population of 2,290 at the 2010 census. It is the main area for businesses and the location of the library and Madison Green Historic District.
- North Madison
- Rockland

== Demographics ==
Historical population
Census	Pop.	Note	%±
1850	1,837		—
1860	1,865		1.5%
1870	1,814		−2.7%
1880	1,672		−7.8%
1890	1,429		−14.5%
1900	1,518		6.2%
1910	1,534		1.1%
1920	1,857		21.1%
1930	1,918		3.3%
1940	2,245		17.0%
1950	3,078		37.1%
1960	4,567		48.4%
1970	9,768		113.9%
1980	14,031		43.6%
1990	15,485		10.4%
2000	17,858		15.3%
2010	18,269		2.3%
2020	17,691		−3.2%
U.S. Decennial Census

As of the 2000 census, there were 17,858 people, 6,515 households, and 5,120 families residing in the town. The population density was 493.3 inhabitants per square mile (190.5/km^{2}). There were 7,386 housing units at an average density of 204.0 per square mile (78.8/km^{2}). The racial makeup of the town was 96.62% White, 0.40% African American, 0.06% Native American, 1.71% Asian, 0.01% Pacific Islander, 0.25% from other races, and 0.94% from two or more races. Hispanic or Latino of any race were 1.34% of the population.

There were 6,515 households, out of which 39.1% had children under the age of 18 living with them, 69.8% were married couples living together, 6.6% had a female householder with no husband present, and 21.4% were non-families. 18.5% of all households were made up of individuals, and 8.5% had someone living alone who was 65 years of age or older. The average household size was 2.72 and the average family size was 3.12.

The town's population was distributed with 28.2% under the age of 18, 3.8% from 18 to 24, 25.3% from 25 to 44, 28.6% from 45 to 64, and 14.1% who were 65 years of age or older. The median age was 41 years. For every 100 females, there were 93.2 males. For every 100 females age 18 and over, there were 89.8 males.

The median income for a household in the town was $87,437, and the median income for a family was $101,297. Males had a median income of $73,525 versus $41,058 for females. The per capita income for the town was $40,537. About 0.9% of families and 1.3% of the population were below the poverty line, including 0.5% of those under age 18 and 2.4% of those age 65 or over.

== Arts and culture ==
=== Library ===
The E.C. Scranton Memorial Library was built in 1901, and was designed by architect Henry Bacon. The library was expanded in 1989.

=== National Register of Historic Places listings ===
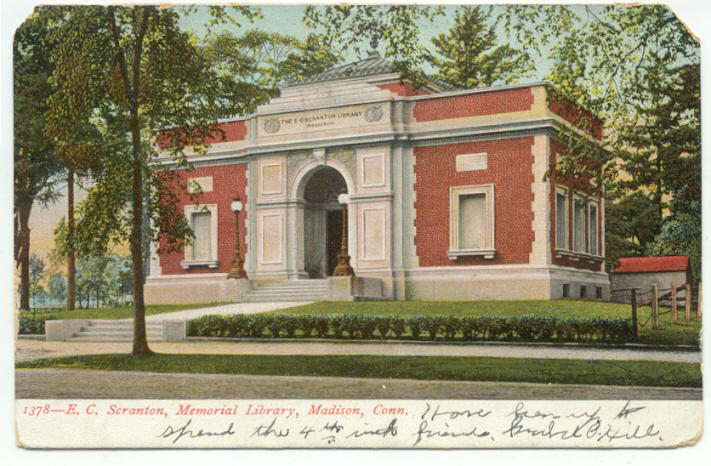
E.C. Scranton Memorial Library, c. 1906

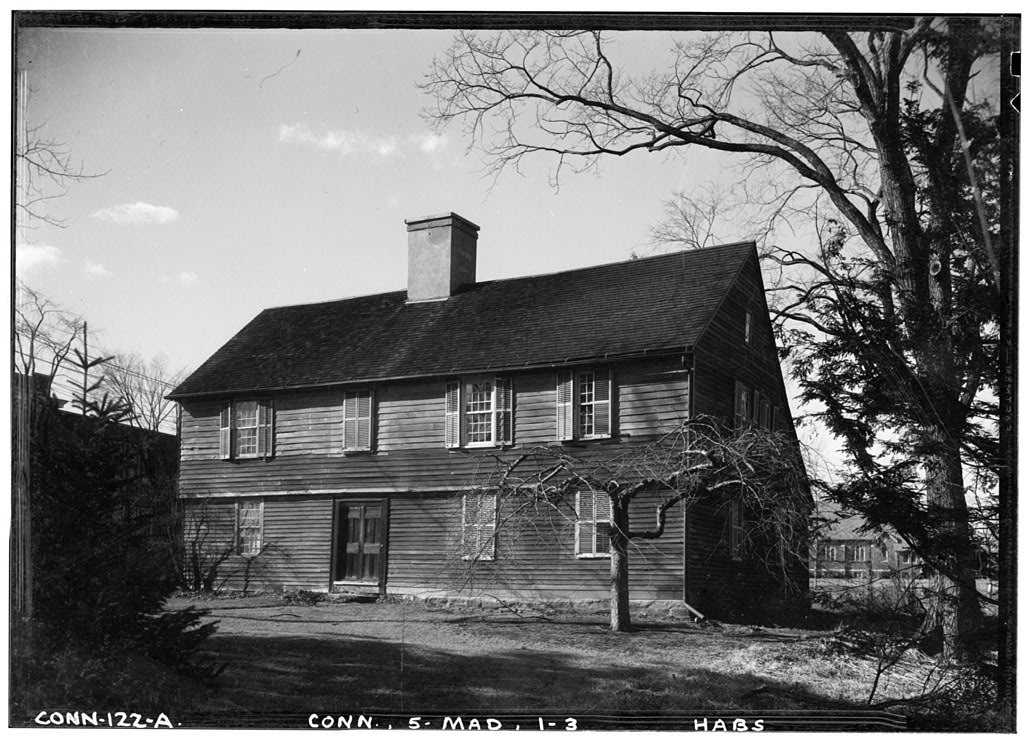
Deacon John Grave House

- Allis-Bushnell House, added February 25, 1982
- Deacon John Grave House, added June 28, 1982
- Hammonasset Paper Mill Site, added February 23, 1996
- Madison Green Historic District, added June 28, 1982
- Meigs-Bishop House, added June 16, 1988
- Jonathan Murray House, added April 12, 1982
- Shelley House, added February 9, 1989
- State Park Supply Yard, added September 4, 1986

== Parks and recreation ==
=== Beaches ===
Hammonasset Beach State Park contains the state's longest public beach, with campsites, picnic areas, and a fishing pier. Beaches included Surf Club Beach, East Wharf, and West Wharf. The Madison Beach Club is located there.

== Government ==
Voter registration and party enrollment as of October 31, 2024
Party	Active voters	Inactive voters	Total voters	Percentage
Democratic	4,658	352	5,010	32.66%
Republican	3,509	279	3,788	24.70%
Unaffiliated	5,805	497	6,302	41.09%
Minor parties	217	21	238	1.55%
Total	14,189	1,149	15,338	100%

Madison was once overwhelmingly Republican in federal elections. In 1924, a strong year for the GOP, town voters gave 85.83% to Republican Calvin Coolidge. The town voted against Franklin Delano Roosevelt in each of his successful campaigns.

Even in 1964, a strong Democratic year, the town gave Barry Goldwater 1,605 votes against Lyndon Johnson with 1,470 votes.

However, Madison residents have delivered Democratic wins in recent years. In the 2008 presidential election, Democrat Barack Obama received 55.78% of the vote in Madison, winning against Republican John McCain with 43.25%. This was the first time that the town had ever voted for a Democrat for president. In 2016, voters gave Democrat Hillary Clinton 54.5% of the vote, while Republican opponent Donald Trump won 41.3% Madison had more registered Democrats than Republicans for the first time in 2019. In 2020, voters gave Democrat Joe Biden 53% of the vote, while Trump received only 37.3%. Democrat Kamala Harris won the town with 61.4% of the vote in 2024.

== Education ==
Madison Public Schools serve grades K–12 and include Brown Elementary School, Neck River Elementary School, Polson Middle School, and Daniel Hand High School.

Private schools in Madison include The Country School, Our Lady of Mercy Preparatory Academy, and Grove School.

== Infrastructure ==
=== Transportation ===
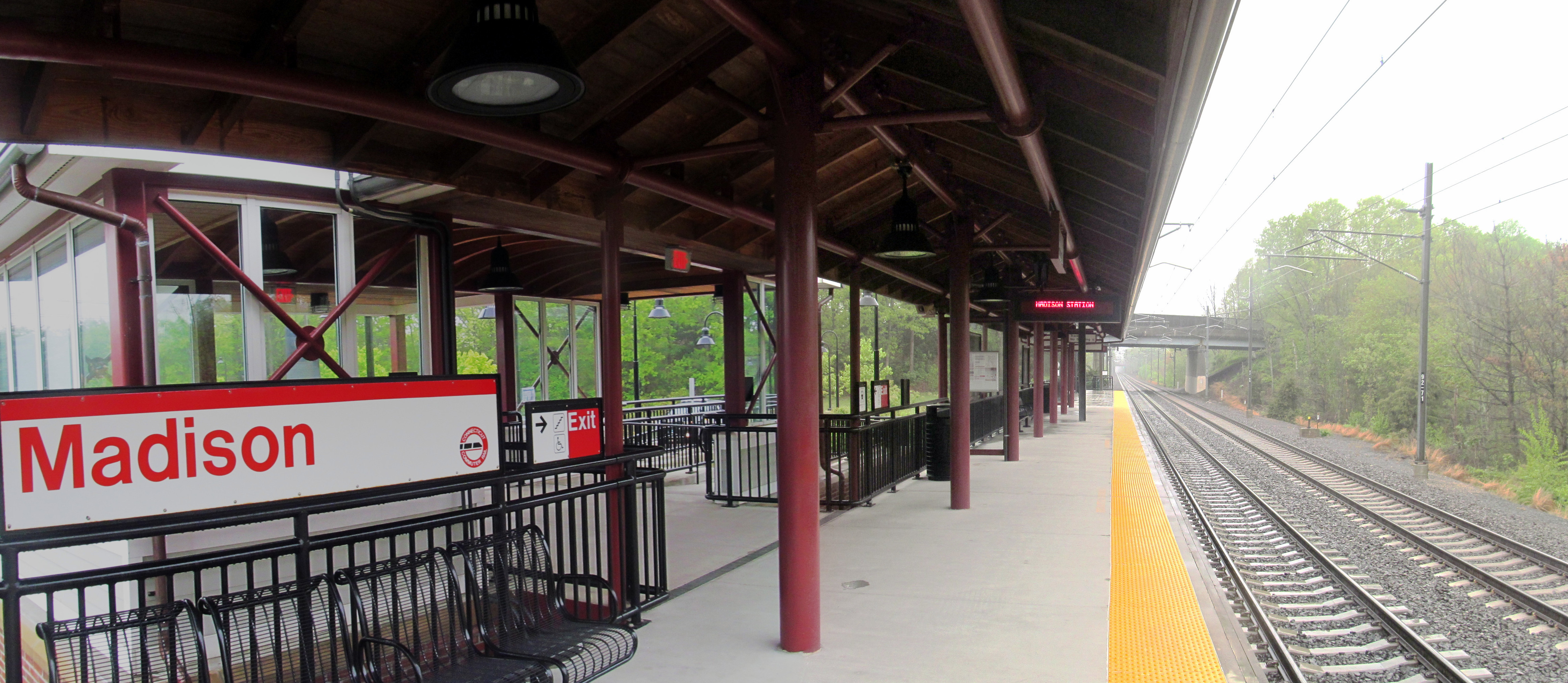
Madison train station is served by Shore Line East

Major roads in Madison include I-95, Route 1, and state highway Routes 79 and 80.

Madison train station is served by the Shore Line East commuter railroad, with service to New Haven's Union Station to the west and the Old Saybrook train station to the east, facilitating connections to the MTA's Metro-North Railroad and to Amtrak's Northeast Regional and Acela Express services.

River Valley Transit's routes 641 and 645 provide public bus service between Madison Center and Old Saybrook and Middletown, respectively, along Route 1. From June 20, 2021, to September 6, 2021, 9 Town Transit now River Valley Transit also operated the Madison Shuttle, providing service between Madison Park and Ride and Hammonasset Beach. CT Transit's route 201 bus connects Madison Center to New Haven.

Beginning in June 2024. River Valley Transit started a new service called XtraMile. Operating in Madison and Guilford, Connecticut. This is a form of microtransit sponsored by Via Transportation. In collaboration with the towns of Madison and Guilford.

From 1931 to 2007, Madison was served by Griswold Airport.

== Notable people ==
- Jill Abramson, former executive editor of The New York Times
- Brad Anderson (born 1964), film director
- Jack Beebe (1925–2015), NASCAR team owner
- Sally Benson, writer of Meet Me in St. Louis
- Elizabeth Bentley, Soviet spy
- Mac Bohonnon, Olympic skier
- John Brent (1938–1985), comedian
- Cornelius Bushnell, financier for the ironclad ship USS Monitor and a railroad pioneer and investor
- Jim Calhoun (born 1942), head coach of 3-time NCAA champion Connecticut Huskies men's basketball team
- Thomas Chittenden, founder of independent Vermont Republic and first Governor of the state of Vermont
- Ranulf Compton (1878–1974), congressman
- Duo Dickinson (born 1955), architect
- Zachary Donohue, figure skater
- Jack Driscoll (born 1997), NFL player for the Philadelphia Eagles
- Frank Duryea, inventor and builder of first American gasoline-powered automobile
- Peter Hastings Falk, expert on American art
- David Dudley Field I (1781–1867), Congregational clergyman
- John Gunther, author of Death Be Not Proud and Inside Europe
- Arnold Jackson, Olympic track gold medalist and World War I brigadier general in British army
- Edwin D. Kilbourne, developer of influenza vaccines
- Charles Kullman, tenor with Metropolitan Opera
- Will Levis (born 1999), NFL player for the Tennessee Titans
- Kiley McKinnon (born 1995), world champion skier
- Rob Moroso, NASCAR driver
- Clio Newton, artist
- John-Michael Parker, member of the Connecticut House of Representatives
- Westbrook Pegler, journalist, anti-New Deal columnist
- Jacques Pépin, celebrity chef, and author
- Joseph A. Scranton (1838–1908), congressman
- Streeter Seidell, comedian, writer, actor, and TV host
- Edgar Snow, journalist, author, and Cold War-era China expert
- Karlheinz Stockhausen, German composer
- Grover Whalen, politician and public relations professional known as "Mr. New York"
- John Willard, U.S. Marshal for Vermont, husband of Emma Willard
- Wheeler Williams (1897–1972), sculptor
- Laurence Witten, antiquarian collector and dealer who sold the Vinland map—later found to be a forgery—to Yale University

Jimmy Destri founding member, songwriter and musician with ‘Blondie’ and others.

== Sister City ==
- Madison, New Jersey, United States
