= Harvard Five =

1940s group of American architects in Connecticut

The Harvard Five was a group of architects that settled in New Canaan, Connecticut in the 1940s: John M. Johansen, Marcel Breuer, Landis Gores, Philip Johnson and Eliot Noyes. Marcel Breuer was an instructor at the Harvard Graduate School of Design, while Gores, Johansen, Johnson and Noyes were students there.

They were all influenced by Walter Gropius, who founded the Bauhaus in 1919, and thereafter became head of the architecture program at Harvard.

The small town of New Canaan is nationally recognized for its many examples of modern architecture. Approximately 100 modern homes were built in town, including Johnson's Glass House and the Landis Gores House, and about 20 have been torn down. Four are now listed on the U.S. National Register of Historic Places: the Landis Gores House, the Richard and Geraldine Hodgson House, the Philip Johnson Glass House, and the Noyes House.

Other notable architects lived in New Canaan and designed residences for themselves and clients there, including John Black Lee, Hugh Smallen, Victor Christ-Janer, Alan Goldberg, and Carl Koch.
