= Landis Gores =

American architect

- Born: August 31, 1919; Cincinnati, Ohio
- Died: March 18, 1991 (aged 71)
- Occupation: Architect
- Buildings: Gores Residence, House For All Seasons, Irwin Pool House

Landis Gores (August 31, 1919 – March 18, 1991) was an American architect. Born in Cincinnati, Ohio, he was known for his modernist Gores Pavilion, the Gores Family House, and the House for All Seasons.

== Early life ==
Gores grew up in the Midwest and graduated summa cum laude from Princeton in 1939, before continuing his education at the Harvard Graduate School of Design, which he selected for its architectural department. While at Harvard, Landis became close with fellow student Philip Johnson and professor Marcel Breuer, who would all later become members of the Harvard Five modern architectural group (which also included John Johansen and Eliot Noyes).

After graduating in 1942, he served in World War II and trained at Camp Ritchie, making him one of the Ritchie Boys. Gores took part in a top-secret operation known as Ultra, which broke the code of the German high command. By the time he completed active duty he had been awarded both the Legion of Merit and the Order of the British Empire. He continued on in the United States Army Reserve at the rank of Major.

== Career ==
Returning from the war, from 1945 to 1951, he worked with Philip Johnson. Johnson would design, and Gores would draft the ideas to a polished resolved result. Gores helped Johnson on Early Miesian inspired houses which included the Booth House, the Rockefeller townhouse, the MOMA garden, and the famous Glass House. Upon complaints that Johnson had not yet passed his New York architectural exam and therefore could not practice in New York state, the two left their office in New York City and relocated their practice to New Canaan, Connecticut. In 1951 Johnson and Gores parted professionally, and on November 1 Gores opened his own architectural practice, a date that corresponded with the birth of his fourth child.

In 1954, only three years later, Gores was stricken with polio. It was just a year before the US government approved the distribution of the polio vaccine. Gores was initially confined to an iron lung and for the rest of his life and doctors informed him that his physical activities would be severely restricted. Nevertheless, he slowly began to resume his work with the help of a close friend John Irwin (for whom he later built the famous Gores Pavilion) who fashioned Gores a special electric typewriter so that he would be able to continue his architectural career.

However, Landis's work was limited, according to his wife Pamela, "people didn't want someone in a wheelchair. It made them nervous." To help her husband continue with his love for architecture, Pamela became involved in his work and even once acted as contractor for one of his projects.

Mr. Gores' work is characterized by several traits. An oversized Prairie fireplace is a common denominator in almost all of his residential buildings. For example, the Gores Pavilion, the Close House and Gores own house all contain styled large fireplaces. Also, like many other modern architects of the time period, Landis included large amounts of natural light by incorporating grand glass windows into his building designs.

Gores was inspired by Frank Lloyd Wright and Walter Gropius's embracement of the International Movement. He visited Gropius's buildings as a student so as to fully appreciate the works of art that Gropius constructed.

In 1991, Landis Gores died. He had no contact with Philip Johnson in the last years of his life, but Johnson nonetheless admired his fellow architect. "...I remember the extraordinary brilliance of Landis in school, his command of English, the amazing ability of his mind...", Philip Johnson wrote in a letter to Landis's widow Pamela Gores.

The Gores family house was listed on the U.S. National Register of Historic Places as Landis Gores House in 2001.

== Notable works ==
Among his most praised works is the Gores Pavilion, in New Canaan, Connecticut. Gores was hired to design the building as a pool house and personal escape lodge for prominent lawyer John Irwin and his wife Jane Watson, daughter of the founder of IBM.

Today, the town of New Canaan owns the Irwins' property and has converted it into a public park. The pool has been filled in, and the neglected Pool House was threatened with demolition. In 2007 the Friends of the Gores Pavilion, with the help of the New Canaan Historical Society, convinced the town to lease the pool house to them as a museum for the modern architecture movement in New Canaan and the surrounding areas. A fundraising campaign has been initiated for its renovation as the "Gores Pavilion." Tom Nissley, co-chair of the Friends of the Gores Pavilion, sums up the rescue of the structure by stating, "The pool house represents the moderns in a very nice way...and it's a public park, so people can come and see it without interrupting someone's home."

== Other works ==
Gores is also known for the Van Doren Hospital and Strathmore Village in Fairfield, Connecticut, as well as the middle school and science buildings of the New Canaan Country Day School. WG Harris Residence, Richmond, Virginia 1962 Close House: New Preston, Connecticut 1965 Mrs. G. Gores House: Norfolk, Connecticut 1965
