= Booth House (Bedford, New York) =

- Interactive map of the Booth House area

General information
- Type: House
- Architectural style: Modernist
- Location: Bedford, New York
- Coordinates: 41°12′03″N 73°37′01″W
- Construction started: 1946

Technical details
- Floor area: 1,440 square feet (134 m^{2})

Design and construction
- Architect: Philip Johnson

The Booth House is a single-story modernist house in Bedford, New York. Built in 1946, the house was American architect Philip Johnson's first residential commission, and is a stylistic precursor to Johnson's better-known 1949 Glass House in New Canaan, Connecticut.

The house's concrete block and plate glass exterior is supported by steel beams and columns, and its interior features a large masonry fireplace. Its design was influenced by Johnson's mentors. Landis Gores described the house as a "cross-breed in concrete block between [Johnson's] Lincoln project for [Professor] Bogner and [Le Corbusier's] De Mandrot house from which it had taken its origin: a raised podium."

== History ==
Johnson designed the house for Richard and Olga Booth, a young couple who wanted a weekend house near Manhattan. Architectural photographer Robert Damora and architect Sirkka Damora purchased the house in 1955 for $23,500 and lived there for 55 years. Sirkka said at the time that the couple had wanted a modernist house but did not think much of its significance.

In 2010, the widowed Sirkka Damora put the 1,440-square-foot (134 m^{2}) house, an 800-square-foot (74 m^{2}) studio building, and their 1.92-acre (0.78 ha) lot up for sale, with an asking price of $2 million. The house was again placed for sale in 2017 for $1 million, and it was ultimately sold for $1.1 million to a group that included art adviser Thomas Rom. This group bought two other lots and initially intended to build a new house before deciding to sell the 1.6-acre (0.65 ha) parcel containing the Booth House. The house was placed for sale for $1.9 million in 2024, and it was sold in 2026 to builder Ravi Arps and architect Drew Lang.

== See also ==
- List of works by Philip Johnson
