= Landis Gores House =

Historic house in Connecticut, United States

- U.S. National Register of Historic Places
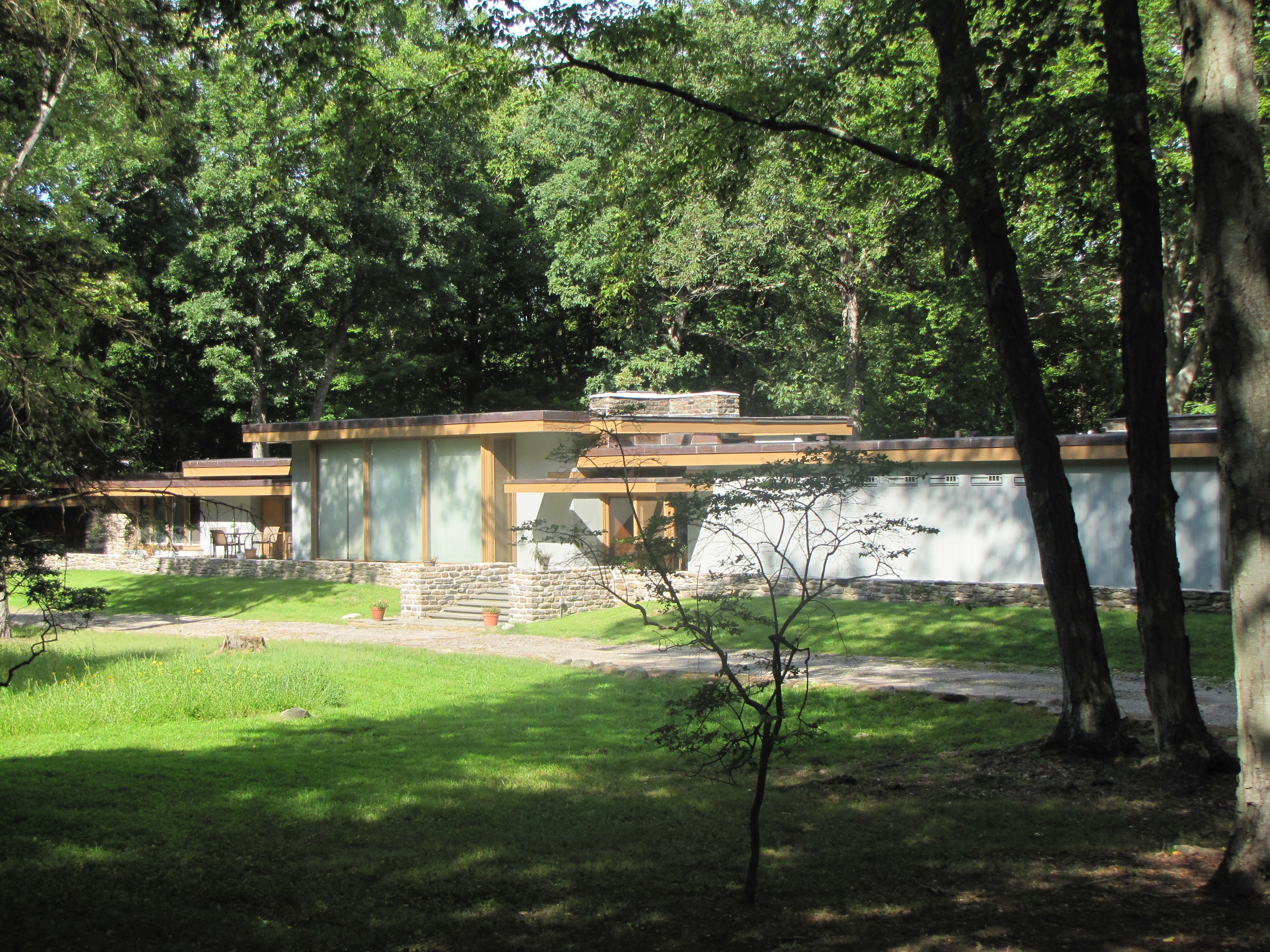

- Location within Connecticut Location within the United States
- Location: 192 Cross Ridge Road, New Canaan, Connecticut
- Area: 4 acres (1.6 ha)
- Built: 1948
- Architect: Landis Gores
- Architectural style: International Style, Wrightian
- NRHP reference No.: 02000189
- Added to NRHP: March 21, 2002

The Landis Gores House is a historic house at 192 Cross Ridge Road in New Canaan, Connecticut. Designed by architect Landis Gores in a "Wrightian" style, it was built by John C. Smith for the Gores family's use. The design represents an innovative fusion of American Wrightian modern architecture and the more International style of the Bauhaus in which Gores was trained. The house was listed on the National Register of Historic Places in 2002.

== Description and history ==
The Landis Gores House stands in a rural residential setting in northern New Canaan, on the east side of Cross Ridge Road north of North Wilton Road. It is a single-story wood-frame structure with a flat roof and is 130 feet (40 m) long, set well back from the road on a 4-acre (1.6 ha) lot. It has austere glass walls, with rough wood and stone elements separating them. A central section has a raised 11-foot (3.4 m)) ceiling, and houses the main living and dining area. A breezeway connects the house to the garage, designed by Gores and using similar materials to the main house. The pool area behind the house was also designed by Gores.

The house was one of the first in a series of modernist houses built in the New Canaan area in the years after the Second World War by Gores and other modern architects. Gores was one of the Harvard Five, architects who had studied under Walter Gropius at Harvard. Gores collaborated with Philip Johnson on his famous Glass House. When this house was built it was a somewhat striking departure from even the Bauhaus origins of his formal training, merging the more naturalistic styles of Wright into a modern design. As of 2019, the Gores family still owns the house.

== See also ==
- National Register of Historic Places listings in Fairfield County, Connecticut
