= Glass House (New Canaan, Connecticut) =

Historic house in Connecticut, US

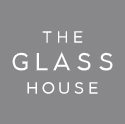

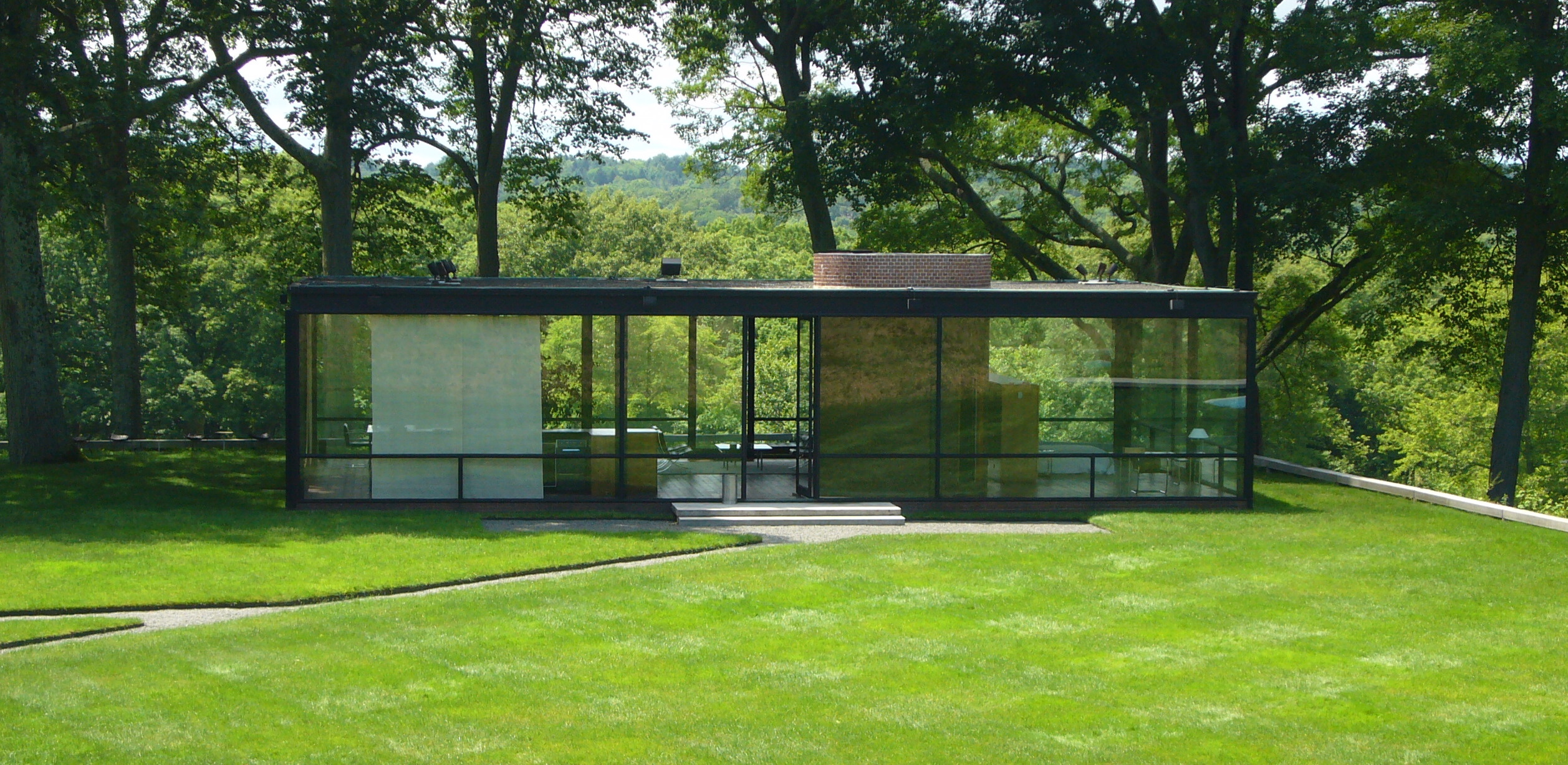
- Interactive map showing the house's location
- Location: 798–856 Ponus Ridge Road, New Canaan, Connecticut
- Coordinates: 41°08′32.7″N 73°31′45.8″W
- Executive director: Kirsten Reoch
- Architect: Philip Johnson
- Public transit access: New Canaan
- Website: theglasshouse.org
- Philip Johnson Glass House
- U.S. National Register of Historic Places
- U.S. National Historic Landmark District
- Location within Connecticut Location within the United States
- Built: 1947–1949
- Architect: Philip Johnson
- Architectural style: Modern
- NRHP reference No.: 97000341

Significant dates
- Added to NRHP: February 18, 1997
- Designated NHLD: February 18, 1997

The Glass House (or Johnson House) is a historic house museum on Ponus Ridge Road in New Canaan, Connecticut. It was built in 1948–49 by the architect Philip Johnson, who designed the home as his weekend retreat. The New York Times has called the home his "signature work".

According to Alice T. Friedman, the Glass House may have been derived from the glass Farnsworth House in Plano, Illinois, by Ludwig Mies van der Rohe, which was completed in 1951, two years after the Glass House. Johnson curated an exhibit of Mies's work at the Museum of Modern Art in 1947, featuring a model of the Farnsworth House. It was an important and influential project for Johnson and for modern architecture. The building is an example of minimal structure, geometry, proportion, and the effects of transparency and reflection. The estate includes other buildings designed by Johnson that span his career. It was designated a National Historic Landmark in 1997. It is now owned by the National Trust for Historic Preservation and is open to the public for guided tours, which begin at a visitors center at 199 Elm Street in New Canaan.

The house is an example of early use of industrial materials in home design, such as glass and steel. Johnson used the residence for 58 years, shared for 45 years with his long time companion David Whitney, an art critic and curator who helped design the landscaping and largely collected the art displayed there.

== Architecture ==
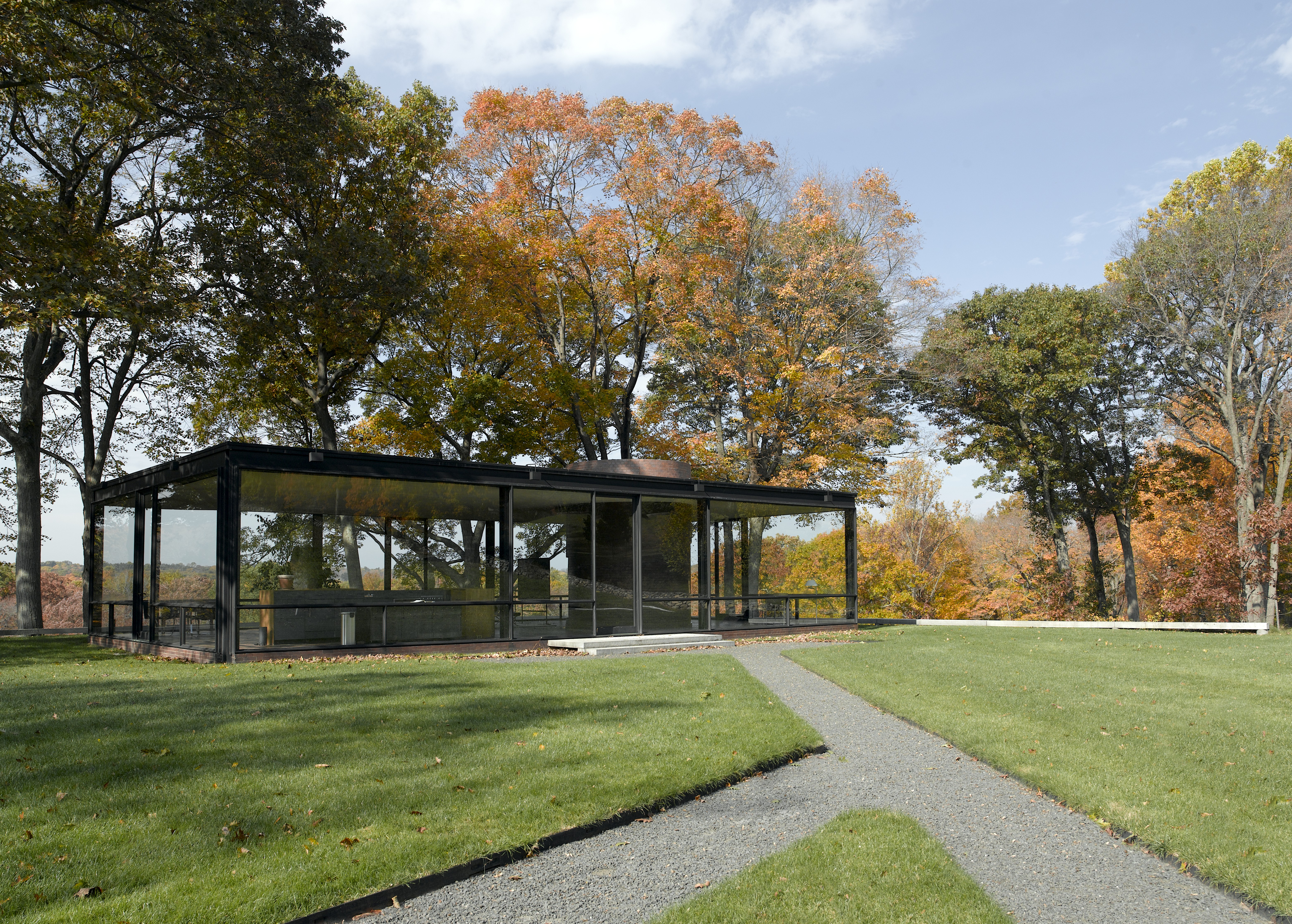
The Glass House

The house is mostly hidden from the street. It is behind a stone wall at the edge of a crest in Johnson's estate overlooking a pond. Grass and gravel strips lead toward the building. The structure is 56 feet (17 m) long, 32 feet (9.8 m) wide and 10.5 feet (3.2 m) high. The kitchen, dining, and sleeping areas were all in one glass-enclosed room, which Johnson initially lived in, together with the brick guest house. Later, the glass-walled building was used only for entertaining. The exterior sides of the Glass House utilize charcoal-painted steel and glass. The brick floor is 10 inches (25 cm) above the ground. The interior is open, with the space divided by low walnut cabinets; a brick cylinder contains the bathroom, the only object to reach floor-to-ceiling.

The home builds on ideas of German architects from the 1920s ("Glasarchitektur"), and was inspired by the design of Mies van der Rohe's glass Farnsworth House. "I have very expensive wallpaper," Johnson once said, of the landscape integral to the home's concept of eliminating the barrier between inside and out. The Glass House contains a collection of Bauhaus items including furniture designed by Mies.

Johnson is quoted as saying that his idea for Glass House grew from "a burnt wooden village I saw once where nothing was left but foundations and chimneys of brick." Mark Lamster, in his biography of Johnson The Man in the Glass House, notes that this was plausibly Johnson's attempt to "intentionally re-create the 'stirring spectacle' that was the burning of Jewish shtetls he had witnessed driving through Poland with the Wehrmacht". Historian Anthony Vidler went further stating that the Glass House could be read as "a Polish farmhouse 'purified' by the fire of war of everything but its architectural 'essence'".

The pastoral landscape surrounding the buildings was designed by Johnson and Whitney, with manicured areas of gravel or grass, trees grouped in what Johnson called outdoor "vestibules", and with care taken in the shape of the slopes and curves of the ground. In part, the landscape was a reflection of a landscape painting, The Funeral of Phocion by School of Nicolas Poussin (circa 1648) placed in a seating area of Glass House, with strikingly similar views having been part of the estate's design. The property overlooks the valley of the small Rippowam River to the west (seen from the back of Glass House, past a grassy rise), and has sloping scenery north and south.

== History ==
=== In Johnson's lifetime ===
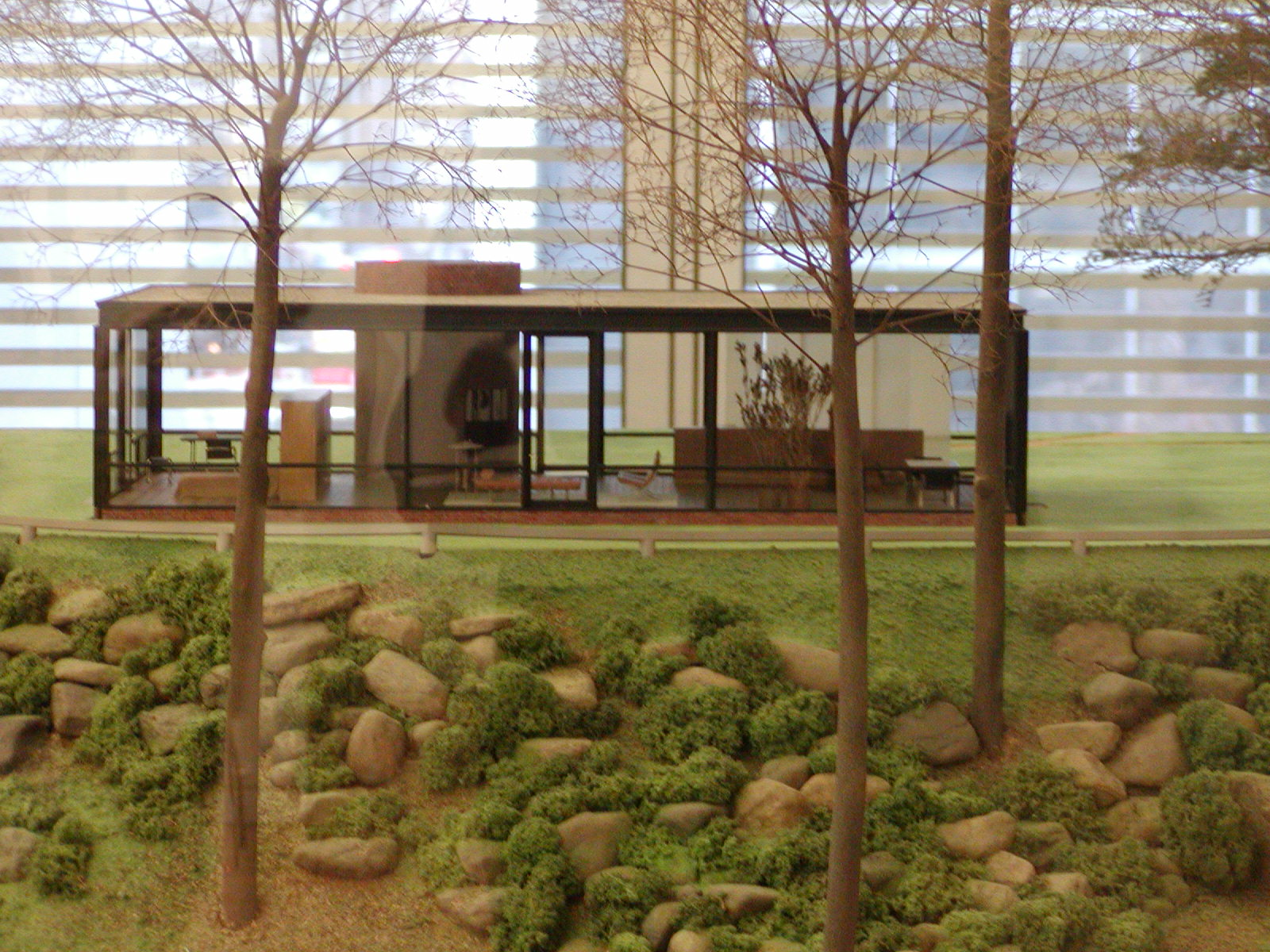
A model of the Glass House on display at the Museum of Modern Art in New York City

Johnson spent three years designing the structure, which was originally one of two buildings (along with the brick guest house) on what was then an 11-acre (45,000 m^{2}) tract.

The Glass House resulted in recognition for Johnson, not just in architectural circles, but also among the public at large. The house was featured in Life magazine, and the New York Times Magazine published a set of cartoons about it. "What really sets Johnson apart [...]" Michael Sorkin wrote in 1978, "is his aptitude for publicity." The Glass House "established Johnson as the titular leader" of Modernist style in 1949. "If it was Mies van der Rohe who provided the real inspiration for the Glass House [...] it was only Johnson who could have built the house and lived in it himself. Johnson's career began when he turned himself into the Man in the Glass House. In an instant, he became the austere apostle for modern architecture—or rather the modern apostle for austere architecture." As Life magazine put it in 1949: "Except when entertaining, Johnson lives alone, servant-less and accompanied only by weather, paintings and books."

The building created such a stir that at one point a police officer was posted nearby to keep out trespassers, and Johnson put up a sign near the street, stating: "This House Is Now Occupied Please Respect the Privacy of the Owner. It will be Open to the Public on specified days". New York Times architecture critic Nicolai Ouroussoff wrote in 2007 that Glass House was "once one of the most famous houses in the United States. [...] [I]ts celebrity may have done more to make Modernism palatable to the country's social elites than any other structure of the 20th century."

The design also incensed Mies, who "stormed out in a huff when he saw it", Ouroussoff wrote. Though clearly derived from Mies's Farnsworth House, the Glass House had been finished earlier. According to Ourousoff, it may have been a sign that "Johnson's vision lacked the intellectual rigor and exquisite detailing that were so critical to Mies's genius". As a curator at the Museum of Modern Art, Johnson had publicized Mies's work, acknowledging his debt to the German architect, particularly in a 1950 interview in Architectural Digest magazine. The historian Alice T. Friedman wrote that Johnson's building "was universally viewed as having been derived from" the Farnsworth House; Johnson had even featured a model of the Farnsworth House in a 1947 exhibit of Mies's work at the Museum of Modern Art.

Before beginning his architectural career, from 1934 Johnson was a follower of the radical populist Louisiana Governor Huey Long, and, then, after Long was assassinated, of Father Charles Coughlin, an extreme anti-Semitic priest who detested President Roosevelt. Johnson became a correspondent of Coughlin's newspaper. During his trips to Germany, Johnson wrote a positive review of Mein Kampf, submitted articles where he decried the "decline in fertility...of the white race", described his visits to Hitler Youth camps, and gave favorable coverage of the Nazi invasion of Poland in 1939. Johnson Ian Volner wrote in his biography of Johnson that when being associated with Nazism was no longer advantageous for the architect he was able to "cover his tracks, [by] burning the bulk of his incriminating letters and articles in the brick-clad fireplace of his landmark Glass House." In 1940, with the war looming, Johnson abruptly abandoned journalism and fascism, and entered architecture school. He was investigated by the FBI for his earlier contacts with the Nazis, was eventually cleared for military service, and served in the Army until the end of the War.

For many Yale University architecture students, it was considered a rite of passage for decades after the house was built to sneak onto the property and see how long they could walk around until Whitney discovered them and told them to leave.

=== After Johnson ===
Johnson wanted to preserve his estate as a public monument "with the aim of cementing his legacy", even building Da Monsta as a visitors pavilion, according to architecture critic Nicolai Ourousoff (although after Johnson's death, National Trust officials decided instead to build a Visitor Center in downtown New Canaan).

The house was declared a National Historic Landmark in 1997. The house was the place of Johnson's passing on January 25, 2005, at the age of 98. Whitney, his partner, died later the same year and left a bequest to support programming and maintenance of the site. Johnson passed ownership of the Glass House to the National Trust for Historic Preservation, which opened it to visitors in April 2007. The trust expanded the size of the property, buying adjacent lots which extended it to 200 acres (0.81 km^{2}).

When the Glass House estate first opened for public tours in 2007, tickets sold out quickly. By July 2010, 15,000 visitors had taken the tour. The Brick House, the guesthouse next to the Glass House, was closed in 2008 and underwent a $1.8 million renovation starting in 2023. The Brick House reopened in May 2024.

== Other structures ==
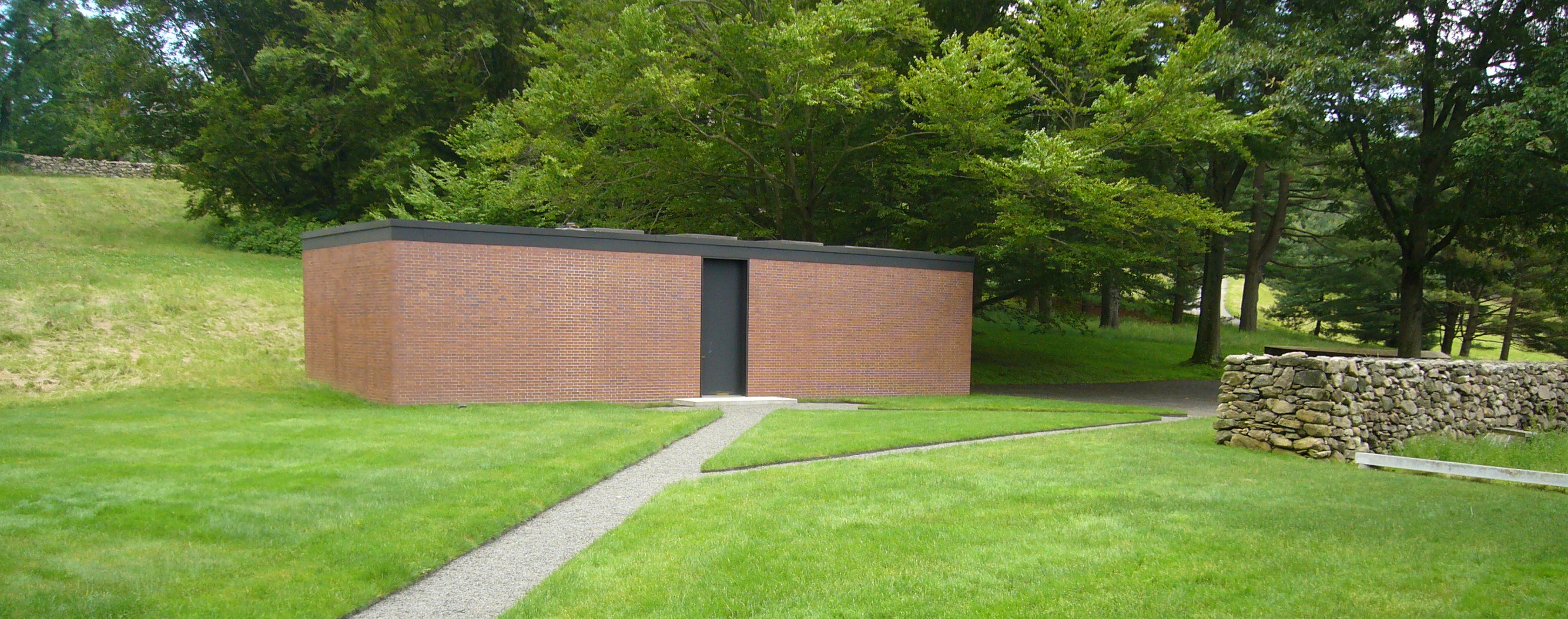
The Brick House served as a guest house.

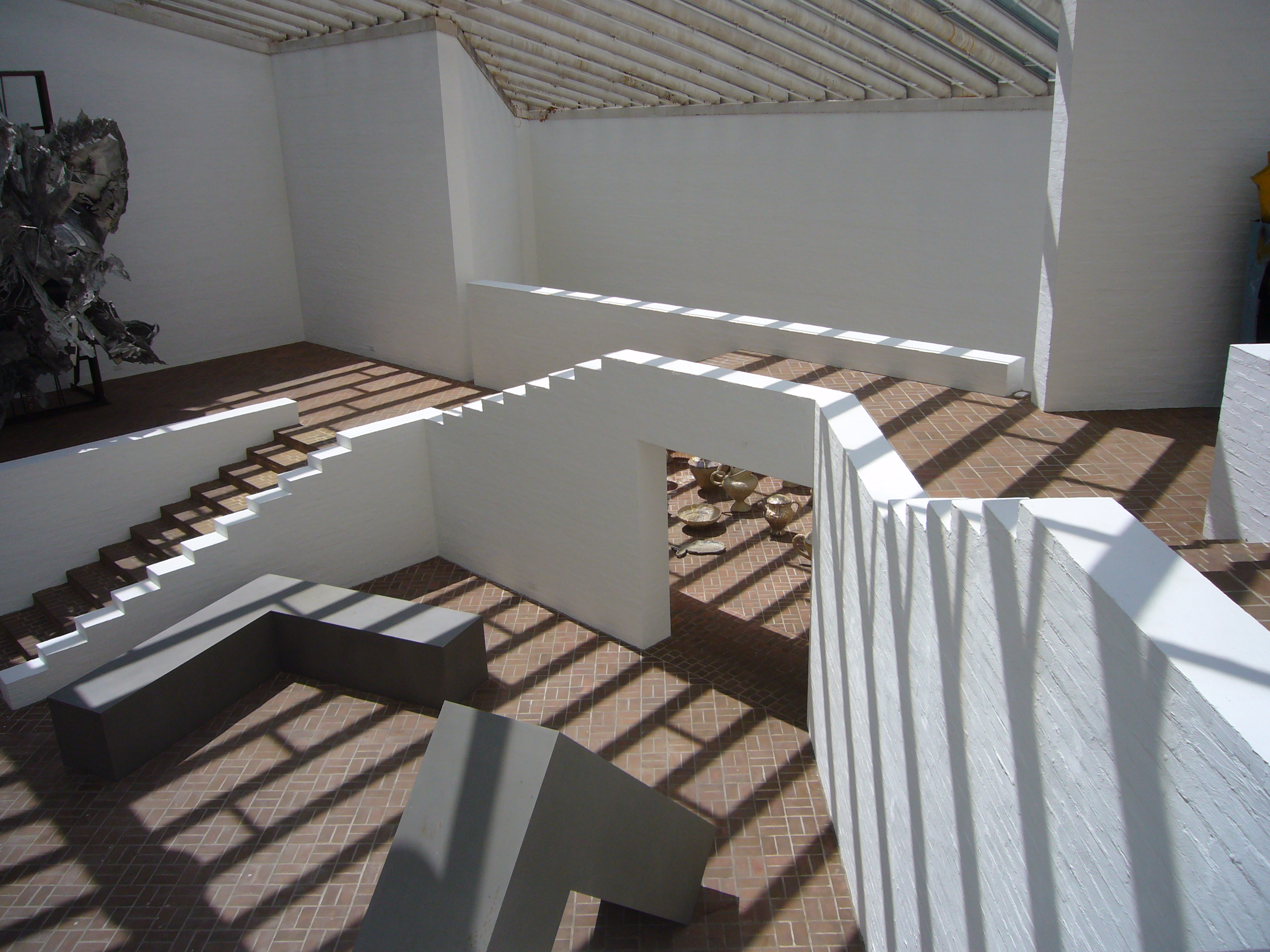
Interior of Sculpture Gallery

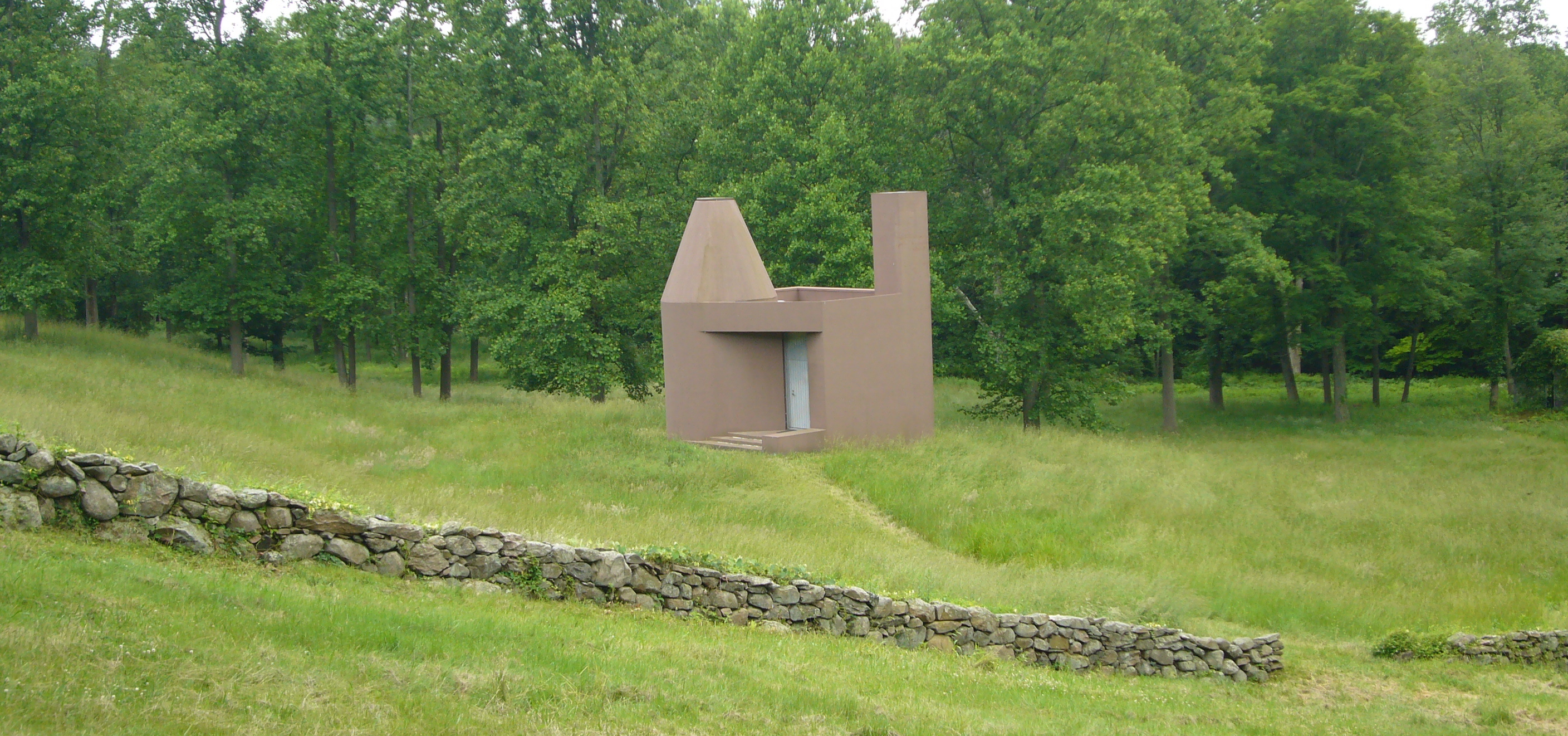
The Study

Johnson's rambling estate also includes 14 structures Johnson designed, including the "Brick House" (1949–1950), which serves as a guest house, the Pavilion on the Pond (1962), Painting Gallery (1965) with 20th-century American art, Sculpture Gallery (1970) with 20th-century American art, the Study (1980), the Ghost House (1982), the Kirstein Tower (1985) (named for Johnson's friend dance choreographer Lincoln Kirstein), and "Da Monsta" (1995).

The collection of structures vary between rectangular and circular. The rectangularity of the Glass House itself is complemented with a circular brick fireplace. The Brick House, also rectangular, faces the Glass House, but a nearby concrete, circular sculpture by Donald Judd (untitled, 1971) and small circular pools on either side of it serve to soften the rectangular effect, although structures and objects throughout the estate are arranged to show patterns or repetitions of curves and angles.

Several buildings on the property served specific functions: the Glass House served for entertaining, the study was used for work and the galleries for storing and displaying the art collection. Johnson called other buildings his "follies" because their size, their shape or both made them unusable, such as the low-ceilinged Pavilion on the Pond or the Ghost House, a structure built with chain-link fencing on the foundation of an old barn and with lilies planted inside, inspired by his friend architect Frank Gehry. Three other existing vernacular houses on the estate (Popestead, Grainger, and Calluna Farms) were remodeled by Johnson.

=== Painting Gallery ===
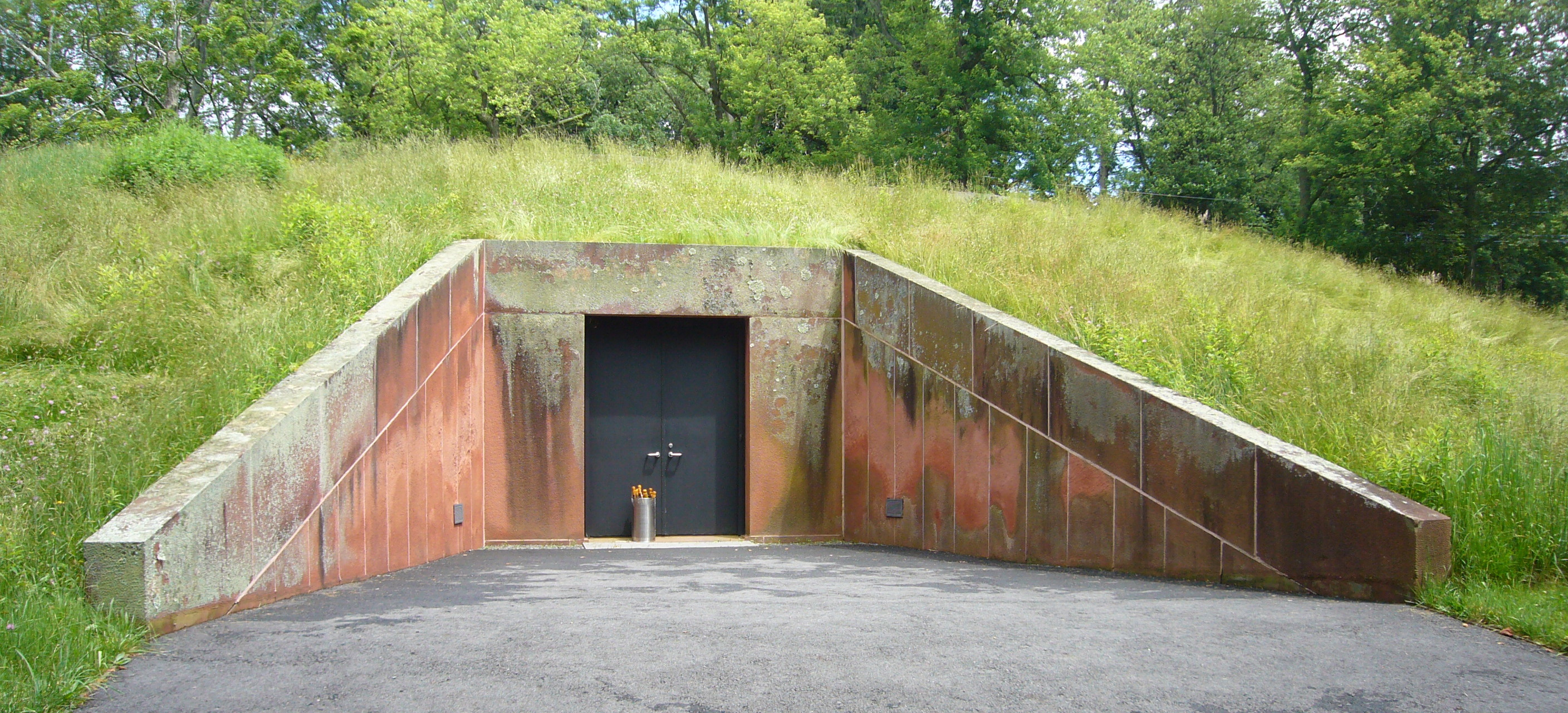
Entrance to the Painting Gallery

The Painting Gallery building is built underground with an entrance modeled on Agamemnon's Tomb. Large-scale 20th-century paintings by Frank Stella, Robert Rauschenberg, Julian Schnabel, Andy Warhol, and Cindy Sherman and more are displayed on a system of three revolving racks of carpeted panels. Johnson and Whitney acquired a large collection over 40 years, but much was donated to the Museum of Modern Art during their lifetime. The gallery still includes an 8-foot tall portrait of Johnson by Andy Warhol, which repeats the same pensive image of the architect nine times in a grid format. Whitney, an art curator and friend of Warhol, Johns, and Rauschenberg, took the lead in shaping the art collection.

=== Da Monsta ===
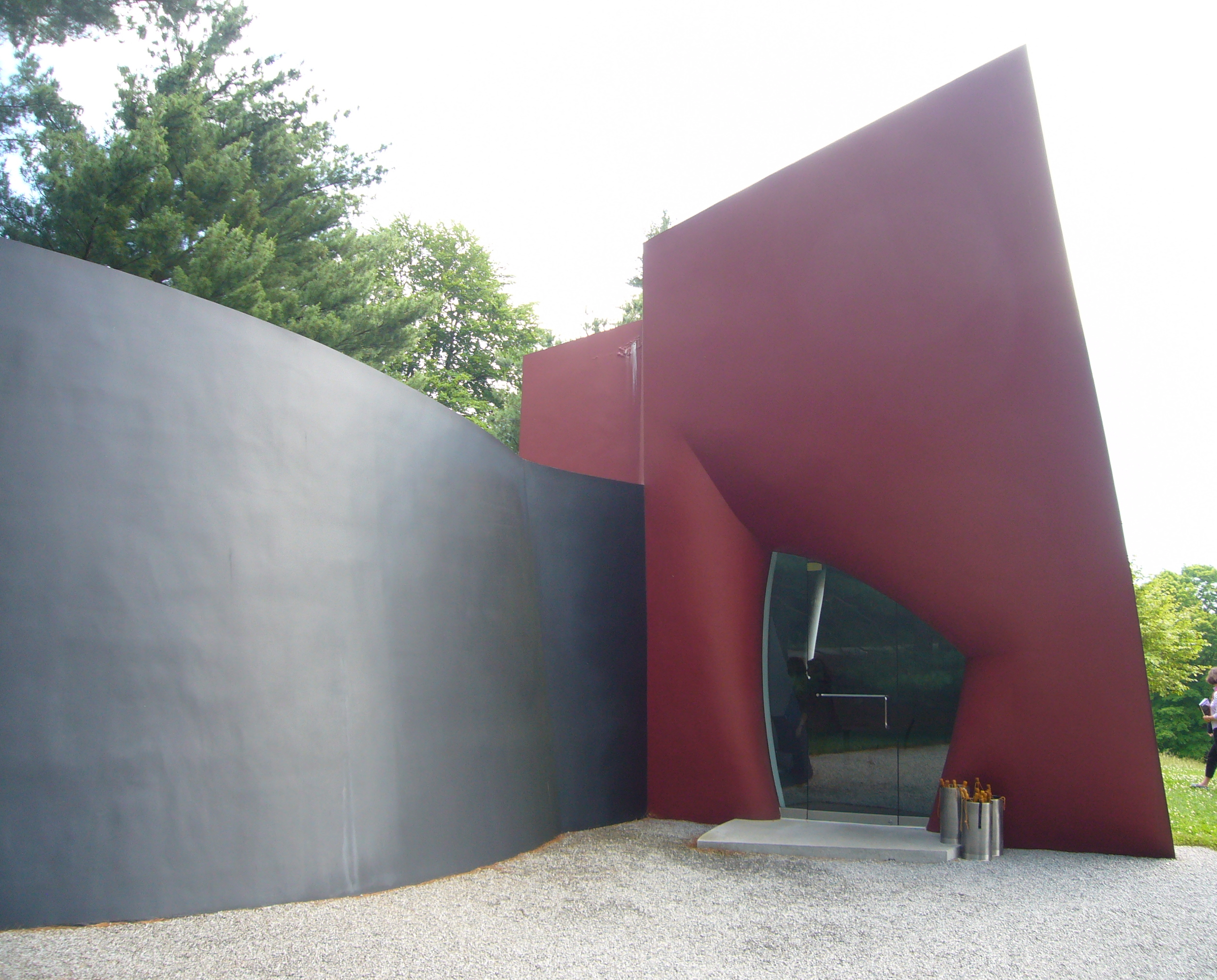
"Da Monsta"

The red and black "Da Monsta", built without right angles and from modified gunite, is one of the few structures visible from the road. Near it is a 20-foot-high (6.1 m) entrance gate, fashioned out of a sailboat boom. In the 1997 documentary Philip Johnson: Diary of an Eccentric Architect, Johnson discusses the buildings he built on the property. Philip Johnson was a friend and supporter of both Frank Gehry and Peter Eisenman – the influence of both seems evident in the form of Da Monsta. However, Johnson claimed that his original inspiration for Da Monsta came from the design for a museum in Dresden by artist and friend Frank Stella. In fact, when Johnson first made a model of this structure, he named it "Dresden Zwei," or "Dresden Two," and presented it to Stella. The name was chosen after a conversation with architecture critic Herbert Muschamp, as Johnson felt the house had the quality of a living thing.

== Tours and visitor center ==
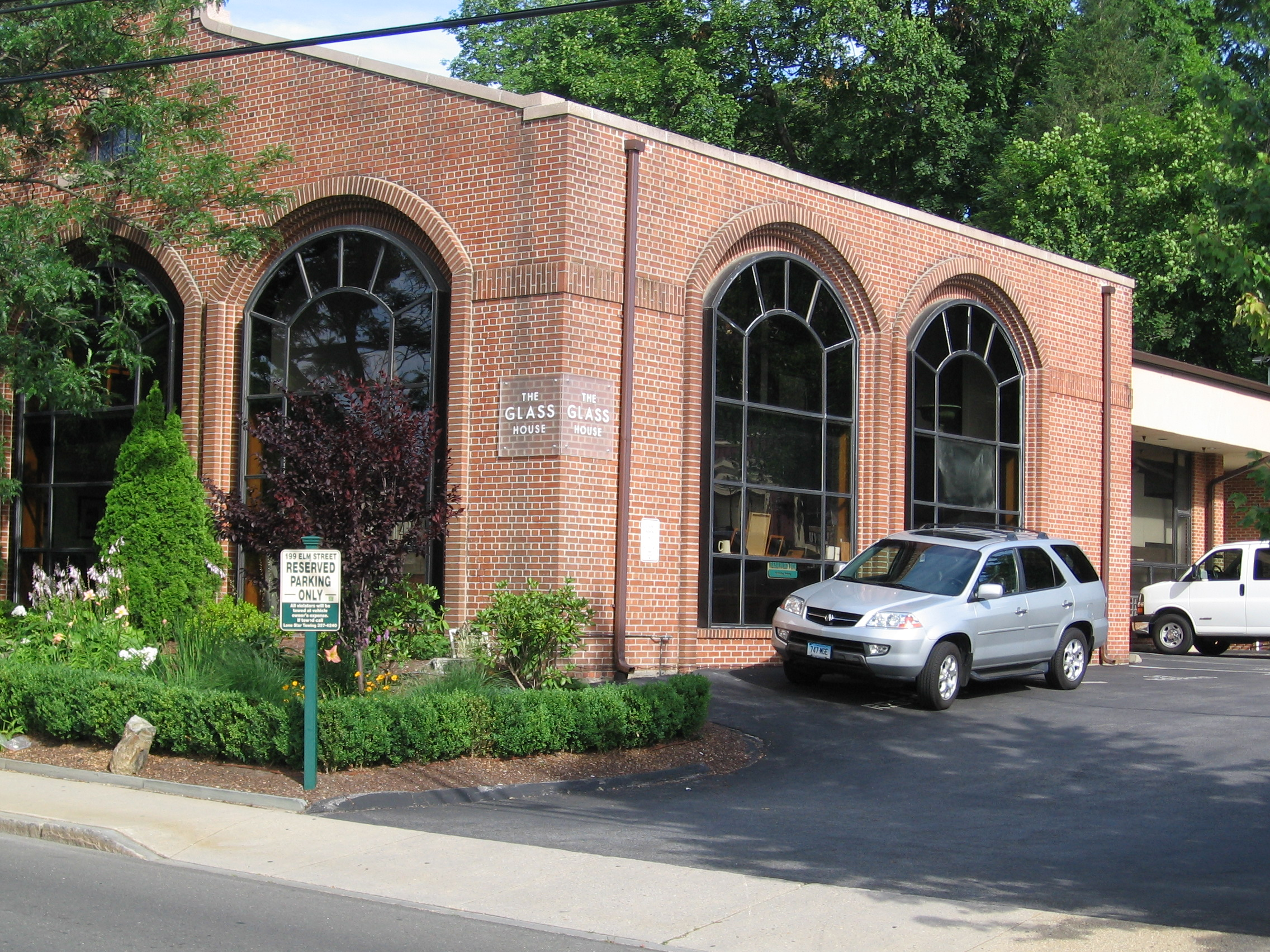
Visitor center in downtown New Canaan

Tour groups are limited to 15 people and include a 3/4-mile (1.2 km) walk through the estate. Tours begin and end at the Visitor Center in downtown New Canaan, Connecticut (across from the train station), where vehicles transport each group to the site near the New Canaan–Stamford border. "Standard" tours last 90 minutes and flash photography is not allowed. There is a pure glass tour that only visits the house and is an hour long. Extended tours last two hours and cost more. Tours at twilight and "personalized" tours are also offered. Special events include a "Dine with Design" picnic and film festival, as well as regularly scheduled Conversations in Context which feature prominent figures in the architecture and design community and take place for a limited number inside The Glass House.

The Visitor Center, which was designed to reflect Johnson's uncluttered aesthetic, includes a "media wall" with multiple video loops running simultaneously on a wall with 24 computer screens. The screens, not meant to be viewed in any order, are meant to reflect the many facets of the architecture, art, landscaping and other features of the estate. When the Visitor Center opened, each of the screens was running a video loop of between two and 20 minutes, centered on a different theme, with a quotation from Johnson, Whitney, or their friends or colleagues.

Along with regular tours, special tours are offered for architects and for artists and museum curators. The latter tours may spend extra time in the Painting Gallery and Sculpture Gallery.

== Reception ==
The Encyclopedia of American Architecture (1980) described the Glass House as being "still considered one of [Johnson's] best buildings".

Nicolai Ouroussoff wrote in 2007 that Glass House was inferior to Farnsworth House in "intellectual rigor" and exquisite detailing. He stated that the steel I-beams at the corners of Johnson's building "are clumsily detailed—especially disconcerting in a work of such purity." Nevertheless, the building is "a legitimate aesthetic triumph", with the glass walls beautifully layering silhouetted and reflected images layered on each other, the critic wrote. "[T]he classical references alluded to by its thin brick base and the symmetrical proportions of its frame demonstrate the range of Johnson's historical knowledge." Ouroussoff criticized the underground picture gallery as too "dark and somber", and said the ability to flip the paintings on movable walls is a more rigid situation than it might first appear, since only six works can be seen at any one time. Ouroussoff praised the sculpture gallery as pleasingly open and rejected criticism that the shadows cast by rafters beneath the skylights distorted the look of the sculpture—he thought the changing shadows enhanced the artwork.

The poor energy efficiency of the Glass House has been discussed as well.

== See also ==
- Booth House, Johnson's first residential commission & a stylistic precursor to the Glass House
- Farnsworth House
- Harvard Five
- Landis Gores House
- List of National Historic Landmarks in Connecticut
- Manitoga
- National Register of Historic Places listings in Fairfield County, Connecticut
- Noyes House
- Richard and Geraldine Hodgson House, across the street from Glass House
- Urban Glass House, Johnson's final commission, inspired by the Glass House
