= Richard and Geraldine Hodgson House =

Historic house in Connecticut, United States

- U.S. National Register of Historic Places
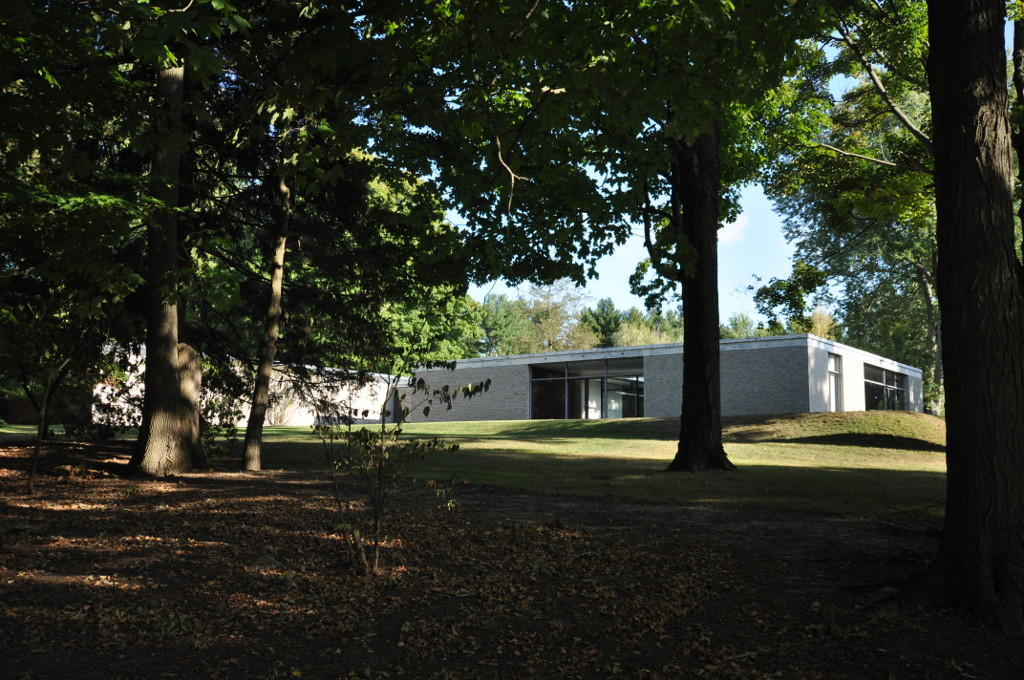

- Location within Connecticut Location within the United States
- Interactive map of Richard and Geraldine Hodgson House
- Location: 881 Ponus Ridge Road, New Canaan, Connecticut
- Coordinates: 41°8′33.9″N 73°31′36.9″W
- Area: 5 acres (2.0 ha)
- Built: 1951
- Architect: Philip Johnson; Landis Gores
- Architectural style: International Style
- NRHP reference No.: 04001549
- Added to NRHP: January 28, 2005

The Richard and Geraldine Hodgson House is a historic house at 881 Ponus Ridge Road in New Canaan, Connecticut. It is an International Style house that was built in 1951 to a design by Philip C. Johnson and Landis Gores. It was listed on the National Register of Historic Places in 2005.

== Description and history ==
The Hodgson House is in a low-density portion of western New Canaan, at the southeast corner of Ponus Ridge Road and Arrowhead Trail. It is a single-story steel-frame structure, with a central U-shaped block housing its public spaces, as well as a rectangular bedroom wing attached via a hyphen. The house is finished in brick and glass, with wooden fascia. The main block encloses an open-air garden court. The bedroom wing was designed to maximize privacy, with only the east-facing elevation having windows.

The house was designed by Philip Johnson; its central block was built in 1950-51 and the bedroom wing, part of Johnson's design, was added in 1955. At the time of the design work, Johnson was in partnership with Landis Gores. Johnson and Gores's partnership broke up soon after the structure was completed, reportedly because Johnson was not interested in Gores's ideas for the house, according to Johnson biographer Franz Schulze. The house was given the Honor Award by the American Institute of Architects in 1956. Richard Hodgson, for whose family the house was built, was a prominent engineer and businessman who was an important early figure in the rise of Fairchild Semiconductor.

== See also ==
- Glass House, also NRHP-listed and designed by Johnson
- National Register of Historic Places listings in Fairfield County, Connecticut
