= Noyes House (New Canaan, Connecticut) =

Historic house in Connecticut, United States

- U.S. National Register of Historic Places
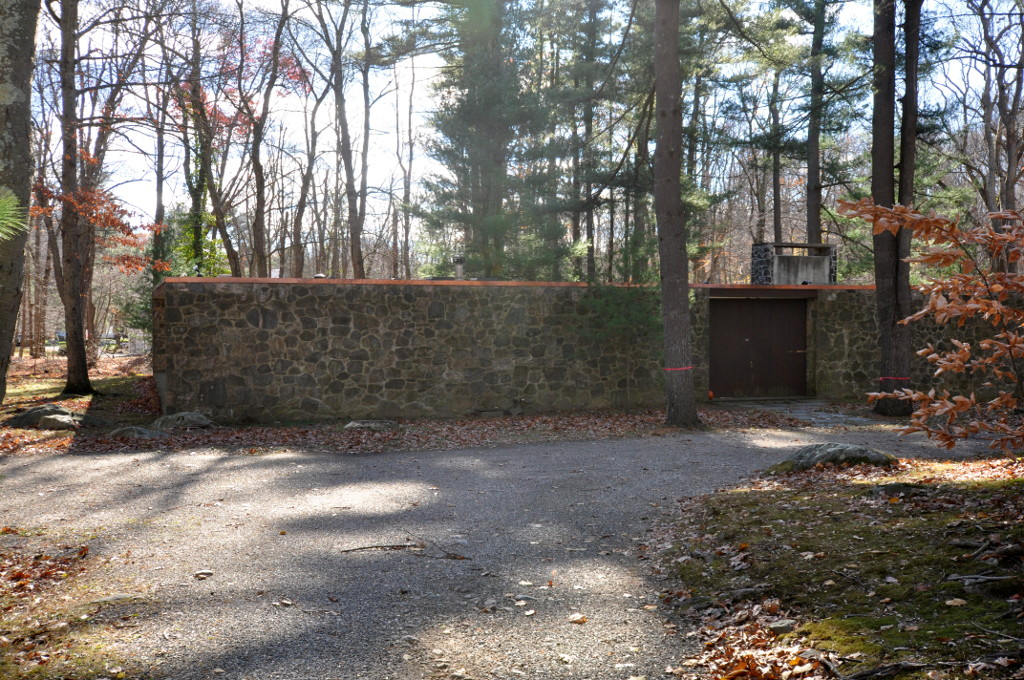
- Location: Country Club Road, New Canaan, Connecticut
- Area: 6 acres (2.4 ha)
- Built: 1955
- Architect: Eliot Noyes; builder: Borglum & Meek
- Architectural style: International Style
- NRHP reference No.: 08000948
- Added to NRHP: September 26, 2008

The Noyes House is an historic home on Country Club Road in New Canaan, Connecticut. Designed in the International style of architecture by Eliot Noyes (1910–1977) and built in 1955 by Borglum & Meek of Wilton, Connecticut. It was the second New Canaan house that Noyes designed for his own family to live in. The first one no longer exists. The house is a single story structure with a courtyard plan. One rectangular module houses bedrooms, while another houses the living areas. The two are separated by an open courtyard, but joined by concrete walkways covered by the flat roof of the house. The north and south walls are fieldstone, while the east and west walls are banks of floor-to-ceiling glass, separated by wood and steel columns.

The house was listed on the National Register of Historic Places in 2008.

== See also ==
- National Register of Historic Places listings in Fairfield County, Connecticut
