= Eliot Noyes =

American architect (1910–1977)

- Noyes portrait from IBM archives.
- Born: Eliot Fette Noyes; August 12, 1910; Boston, Massachusetts, U.S.
- Died: July 18, 1977 (aged 66); New Canaan, Connecticut, U.S.
- Education: Harvard College, Harvard Graduate School of Design
- Occupations: Architect, Industrial Designer
- Years active: 1939–1977
- Spouse: Molly Duncan Weed
- Children: 4, including Eli

Eliot Fette Noyes (August 12, 1910 – July 18, 1977) was an American architect and industrial designer, who worked on projects for IBM, most notably the IBM Selectric typewriter and the IBM Aerospace Research Center in Los Angeles, California. Noyes was also a pioneer in development of comprehensive corporate-wide design programs that integrated design strategy and business strategy. Noyes worked on corporate imagery for IBM, Mobil Oil, Cummins Engine and Westinghouse.

== Early life ==
Eliot Noyes was born in Boston, Massachusetts. Shortly after his birth, Noyes moved to Colorado where he resided until age seven. At this point, Noyes and his family moved to Cambridge, Massachusetts. Noyes’ father taught English at Harvard University and his mother was an accomplished pianist.

He was not always set on architecture. As a teen, he seriously contemplated becoming a painter; however by age 19 he had his mind set on architecture. He first enrolled at Harvard University in 1932 to obtain a bachelor's degree in the Classics. Noyes’ experience at Harvard was unlike the other four members of the Harvard Five. When he arrived at Harvard, the school was still under the influence of the Beaux-Arts architecture movement – hardly the modernist influence that the other four received. However, after meeting guest lecturer Le Corbusier in the school library, his architectural outlook changed entirely. He was inspired by Le Corbusier's work and researched the Bauhaus. In his junior year at Harvard, he traveled to Iran for an archaeological expedition. Upon returning to the school, Noyes found that Harvard had undergone a complete revolution. Gropius and Breuer had already arrived there, and with them came a new modernist spirit at the school. In 1938 he received his architecture degree from Harvard Graduate School of Design.

While at Harvard, Noyes was also a member of the Harvard soaring club and flew the club's new Schweizer Aircraft-built SGU1-7 glider.

== Career ==
After graduating with his masters in architecture in 1938, Noyes joined Walter Gropius and Marcel Breuer's firm in Cambridge, Massachusetts. From 1939 to 1946, Noyes was employed by the Museum of Modern Art (MoMA) in New York City as director of industrial design. He took leave from MoMA during World War II to set up a program to explore the potential uses for gliders by the Army Air Force. He later served as an industrial designer for Norman Bel Geddes and Co. In 1967 he was inducted into the National Academy.

== Works ==
Noyes' first house, built in 1941, was the Jackson House in Dover, MA. This was followed in 1950 by the Tallman House and Bremer House in New Canaan. Residing in New Canaan for 30 years, he designed more residential buildings including the Ault House (1951), the Weeks House (1953), and the Noyes House (1955). In 1953 he designed bubble houses which were built the next year in Hobe Sound, Florida. One of his most notable designs was the Wilton Library (1974) in the neighboring town of Wilton, Connecticut.

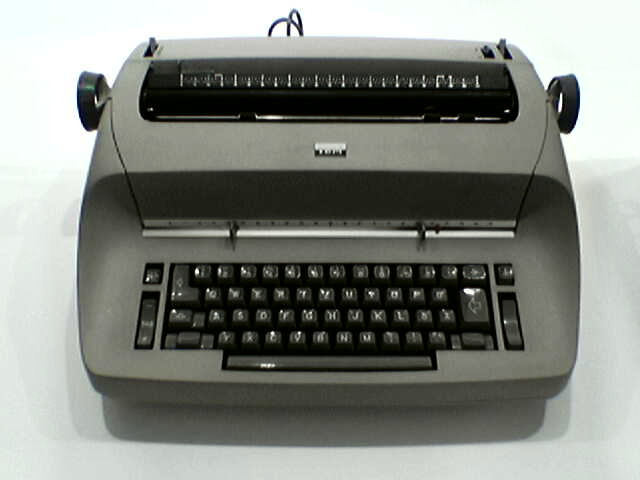
IBM Selectric typewriter

Noyes spent twenty-one years working as consultant design director for IBM, designing the IBM Selectric typewriter in 1961 and numerous other products, while also advising the IBM internal design staff. Prior to his work on the Selectric, Noyes was commissioned in 1956 by Thomas J. Watson, Jr to create IBM's first corporate-wide design program — indeed, these influential efforts, in which Noyes collaborated with Paul Rand and Charles Eames, have been referred to as the first comprehensive design program in American business. Noyes was commissioned regularly by IBM to design various products as well as buildings for the corporation. His most famous and well known of these buildings are the IBM building in Garden City, New York (1966), the IBM Aerospace Building in Los Angeles, California (1964), the IBM Pavilion Hemisfair in San Antonio, Texas (1968), and the IBM Management Development Center in Armonk, New York (1980). Noyes also selected other notable architects such as Mies van der Rohe, Eero Saarinen, Marco Zanuso and Marcel Breuer to design IBM buildings around the world.

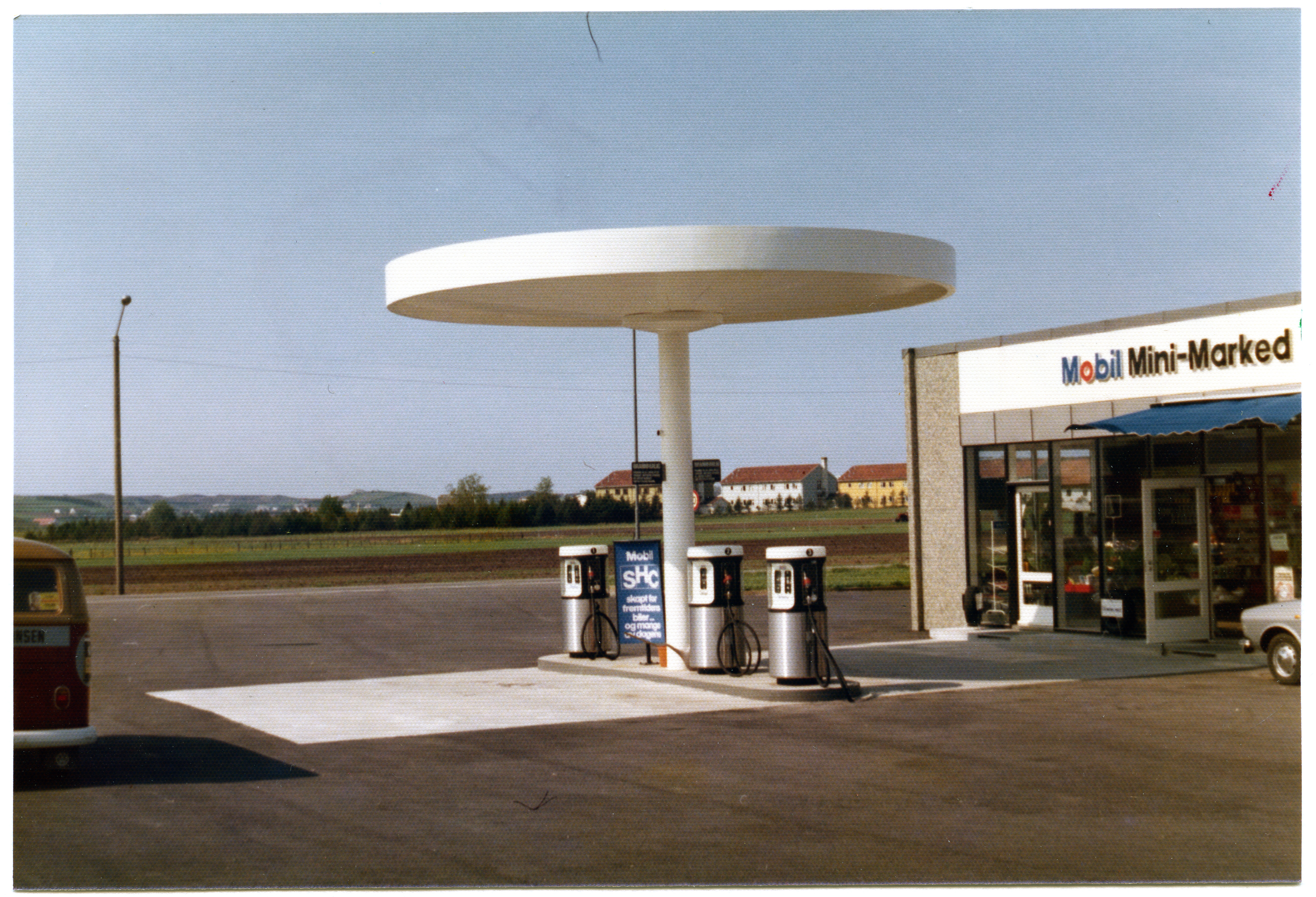
Mobil gas station

Noyes also redesigned the standard look for all round Mobil gasoline stations and fuel pumps during the 1960s (and hired the graphic design firm Chermayeff & Geismar to redesign the Mobil logo). His New Canaan, Connecticut residence is regarded as an important piece of Modernist architecture.

== Design philosophy ==
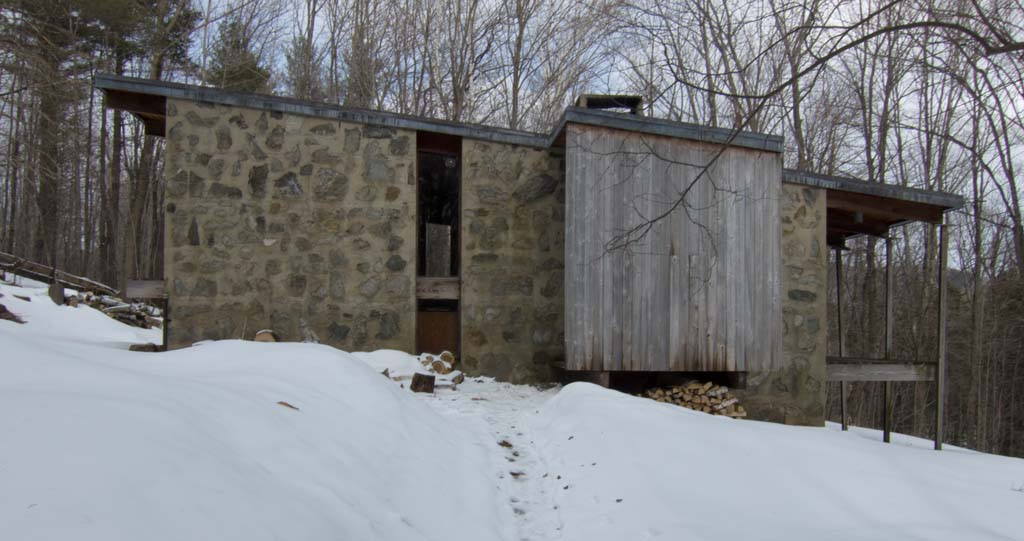
Ski chalet designed and built by Noyes near Killington, Vermont

Noyes was notable among architects of the 20th century modern period in American architectural history (1910—1997). He was a member of the Harvard Five, a group of modern architects who practiced in New Canaan, Connecticut. Noyes began his career working for Walter Gropius, and in the 1940s was instrumental in promoting the early work of Charles Eames and Eero Saarinen as curator of industrial design at the Museum of Modern Art in New York. An instance of this was the MoMA competition Organic Design in Home Furnishings, which was published in a book by the museum.

Noyes believed that each region of the United States has buildings inspired by the climate. He was a strong advocate of functional Modernism and his work was firmly grounded in the tradition of Gropius, Breuer & Le Corbusier. He advocated simplicity of form and truth to the nature of materials which is seen particularly in his houses. He was responsible for many residential and commercial archetypes alike. Likewise, Noyes' corporate design program philosophy was to ensure that design expressed the true leadership essence of the company and embodied technology in new and appropriate ways. His approach went far beyond a typical corporate identity project. Achieving harmony between design strategy and business strategy was the hallmark of Noyes' work with IBM, and other companies that followed. Noyes' residential and industrial designs established him as a leader in the fields of post-war American architecture and integrated industrial design.

The Harvard Graduate School of Design has established a professorship, called the "Eliot Noyes Professor of Architectural Theory".

== Personal life ==
Noyes married the architect Mary "Molly" Duncan Weed (1915–2010) who created much of the interior design work on Noyes' projects. They had four children: Meridee, animator Eli, architect Frederick, and graphic artist Derry.

== Quotes ==
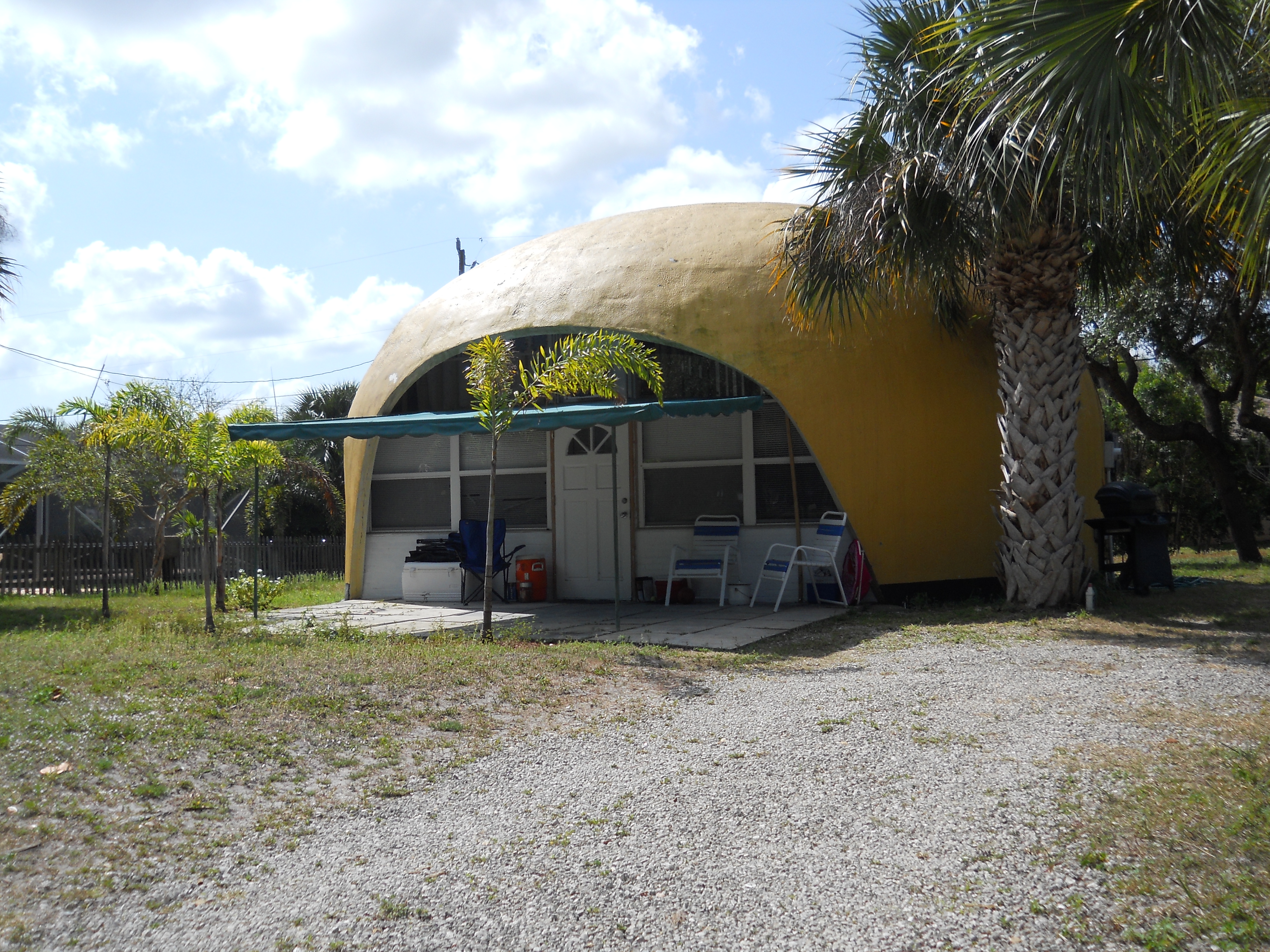
Bubble House in Hobe Sound

- "Details must play their part in relation to the overall concept and character of the building, and are the means by which the architect may underline his main idea, reinforce it, echo it, intensify or dramatize it."
- "One thing I am not going to become is a guy who is called in to change the expression on the corporate face by hanging abstract paintings on the office walls."

== Bibliography ==
- Noyes, Eliot F. (1941). Organic Design In Home Furnishings. New York: Museum of Modern Art. ASIN B000J32JB6.
- Noyes, Eliot F. (1942). Wartime Housing: The Bulletin of the Museum of Modern Art 4 Volume IX May 1942. New York: Museum of Modern Art. ASIN B0094KRVJA.
