= Hugh Smallen =

American architect

Hugh Jerome Smallen Jr. (May 6, 1919 – June 11, 1990) was part of the second wave of modernist architects to live and practice in New Canaan, Connecticut.

== Early life ==
Smallen was born on May 6, 1919, in New York City. He decided to pursue a major in architecture at Yale University against his father’s will. His education was interrupted when he was needed in World War II where he served as an aerial photographer.

Smallen received his degree in architecture from Yale University in 1948. And in 1949 he attended the Institute of Design in Brooklyn. He then began his architectural career in the New York office of the renowned firm Skidmore, Owings and Merrill. In 1950 the New York native felt his time there had expired.

== Career ==
He moved to New Canaan with his wife Kathryn and opened his own architectural and design consulting office, Hugh Smallen & Associates.

That same year, he opened a contemporary furniture store called “Design Collaborative” with the help of his wife. His interior design work included many projects for IBM. In 1952 the design of his shop was displayed in the “De Stijl” exhibit in the Museum of Modern Art.

Smallen believed in a utilitarian way of living and these beliefs are reflected in his designs. Smallen’s designs are often characterized by their wide range of building materials including the use of wood, brick, cement, steel and stone which helped achieve a simplified way of living.

Smallen continued his work in architecture and interior design up until his death on June 11, 1990, at Sarasota Memorial Hospital, Florida.

== Work ==
- Tatum House, New Canaan, Connecticut
