= New Canaan, Connecticut =

Town in Connecticut, United States

- Town
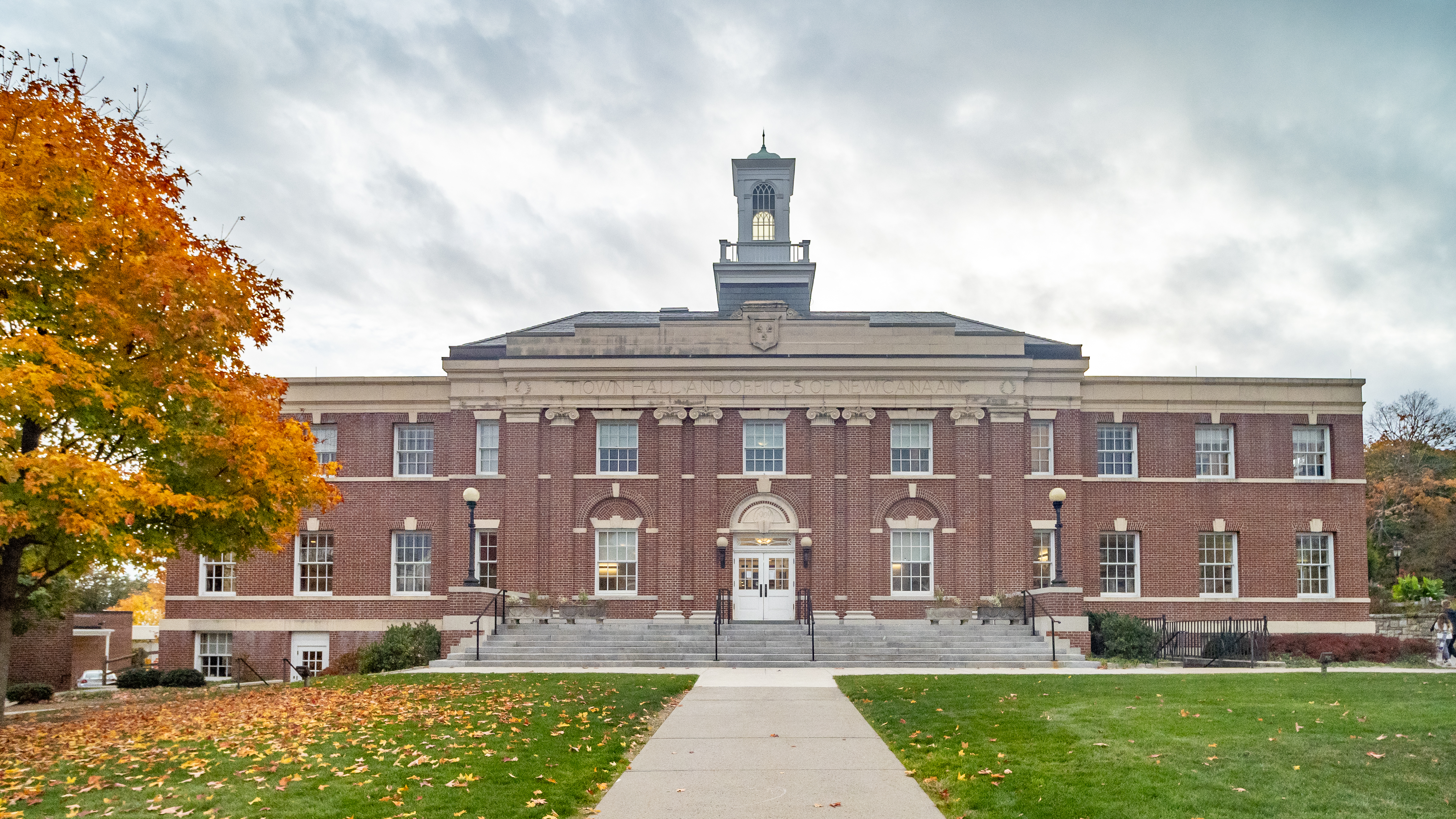
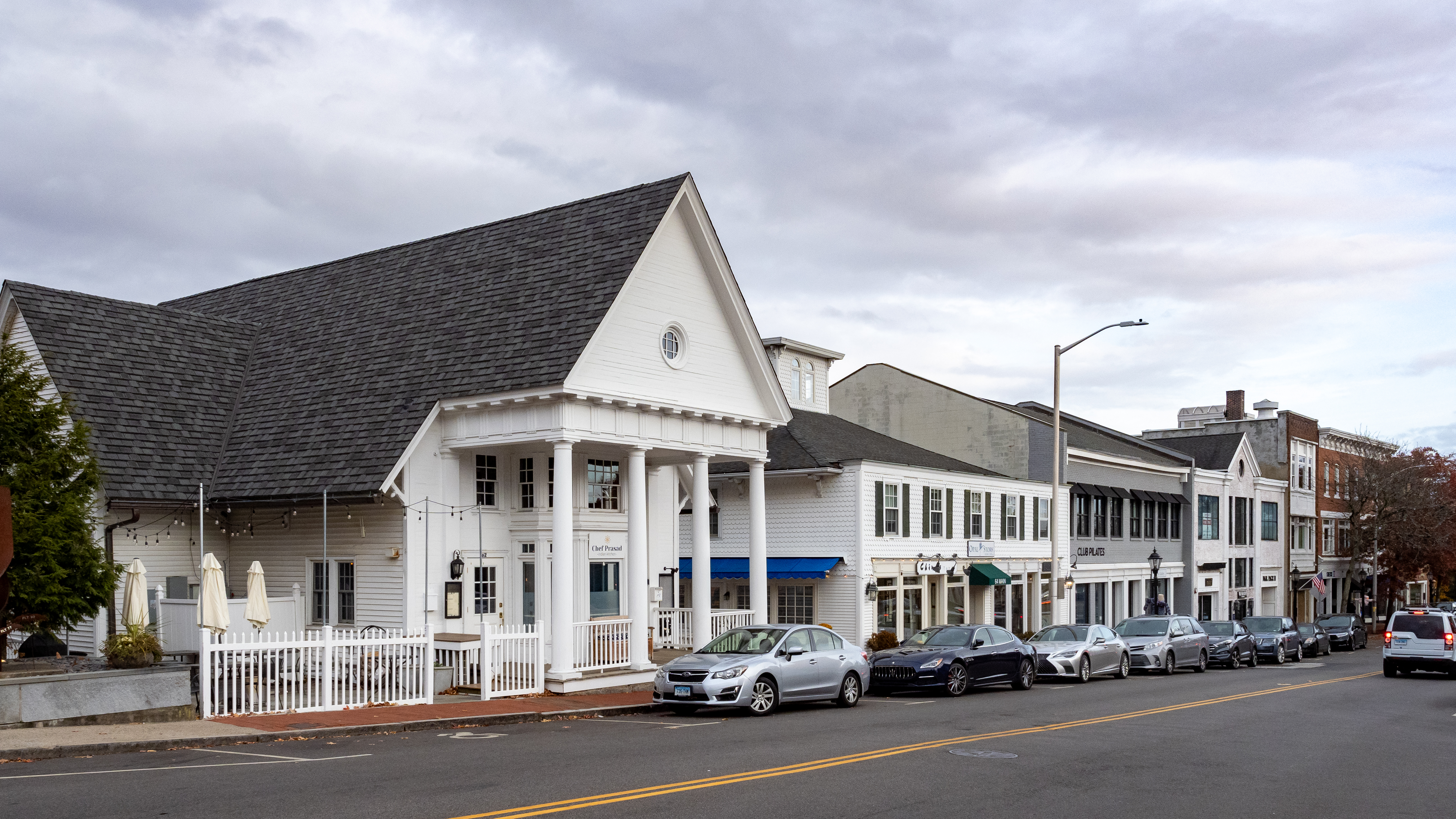
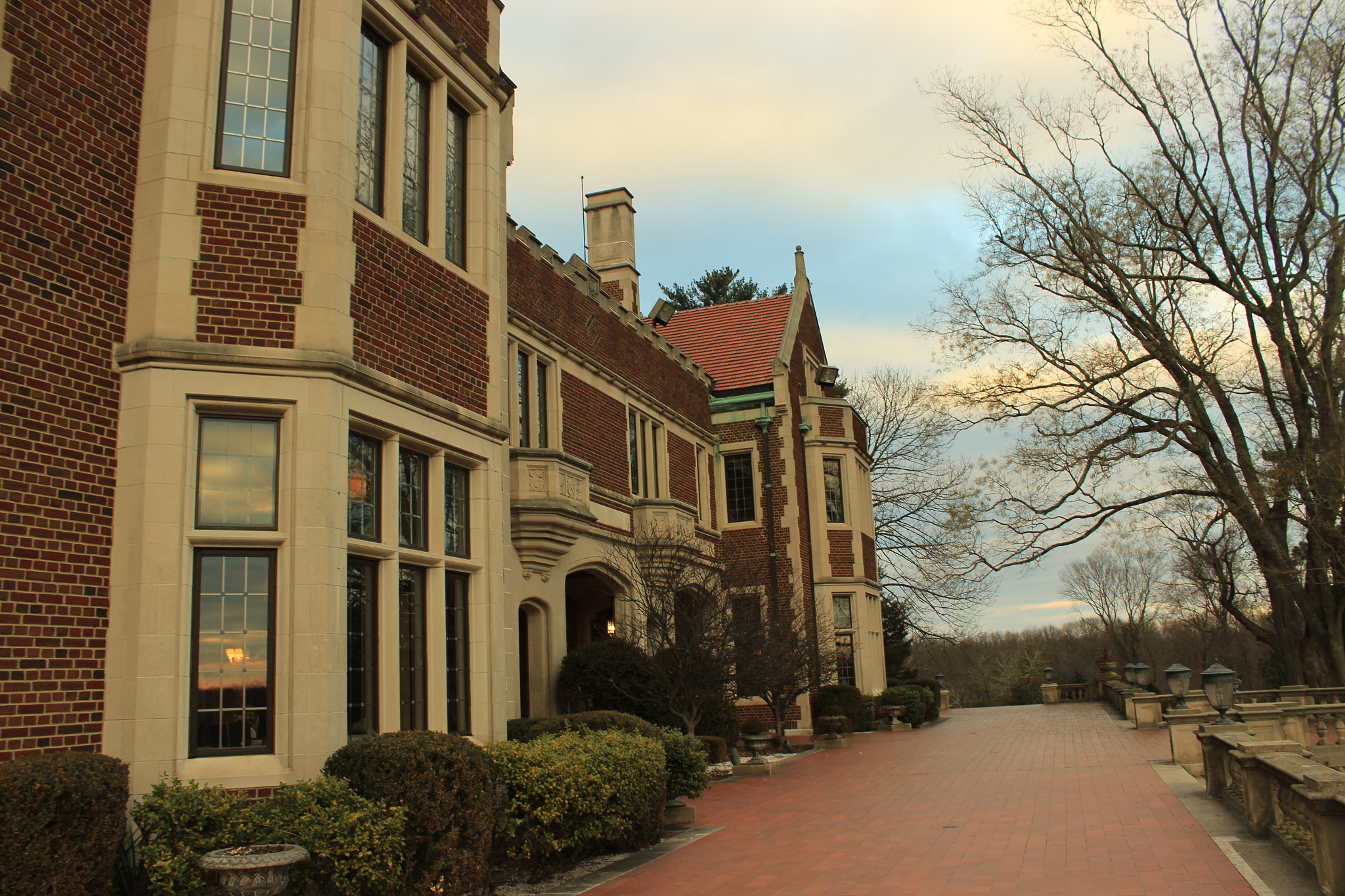
- Town Hall Downtown Waveny Park estate

- Seal

- Coordinates: 41°08′48.48″N 73°29′41.64″W
- Country: United States
- U.S. state: Connecticut
- County: Fairfield
- Region: Western CT
- Settled: 1731

Government
  - Type: Selectman-town council
  - First Selectman: Dionna Carlson (R)
  - Selectman: Stephen Karl (R)
  - Selectwoman: Amy Murphy (R)

Area
  - Total: 22.5 sq mi (58.3 km^{2})
  - Land: 22.1 sq mi (57.3 km^{2})
  - Water: 0.35 sq mi (0.9 km^{2})
- Elevation: 344 ft (105 m)

Population (2020)
  - Total: 20,622
  - Density: 932/sq mi (359.9/km^{2})
- Demonym: New Canaanite
- Time zone: UTC−5 (Eastern)
  - Summer (DST): UTC−4 (Eastern)
- ZIP Code: 06840
- Area codes: 203/475
- FIPS code: 09-50580
- GNIS feature ID: 0213468
- Website: www.newcanaan.info

New Canaan (/ˈkeɪnən/) is a town in Fairfield County, Connecticut. The population was 20,622 according to the 2020 census. The town is part of the Western Connecticut Planning Region.

The town is considered part of Connecticut's Gold Coast. The town is bounded on the south by Darien, to the west by Stamford, on the east by Wilton, on the southeast by Norwalk, and on the north by Lewisboro and Pound Ridge in Westchester County, New York.

New Canaan is known for its architecture and public parks such as Waveny Park, and a town center with boutiques. Residents sing carols on God's Acre every Christmas Eve, a town tradition since 1916.

== History ==
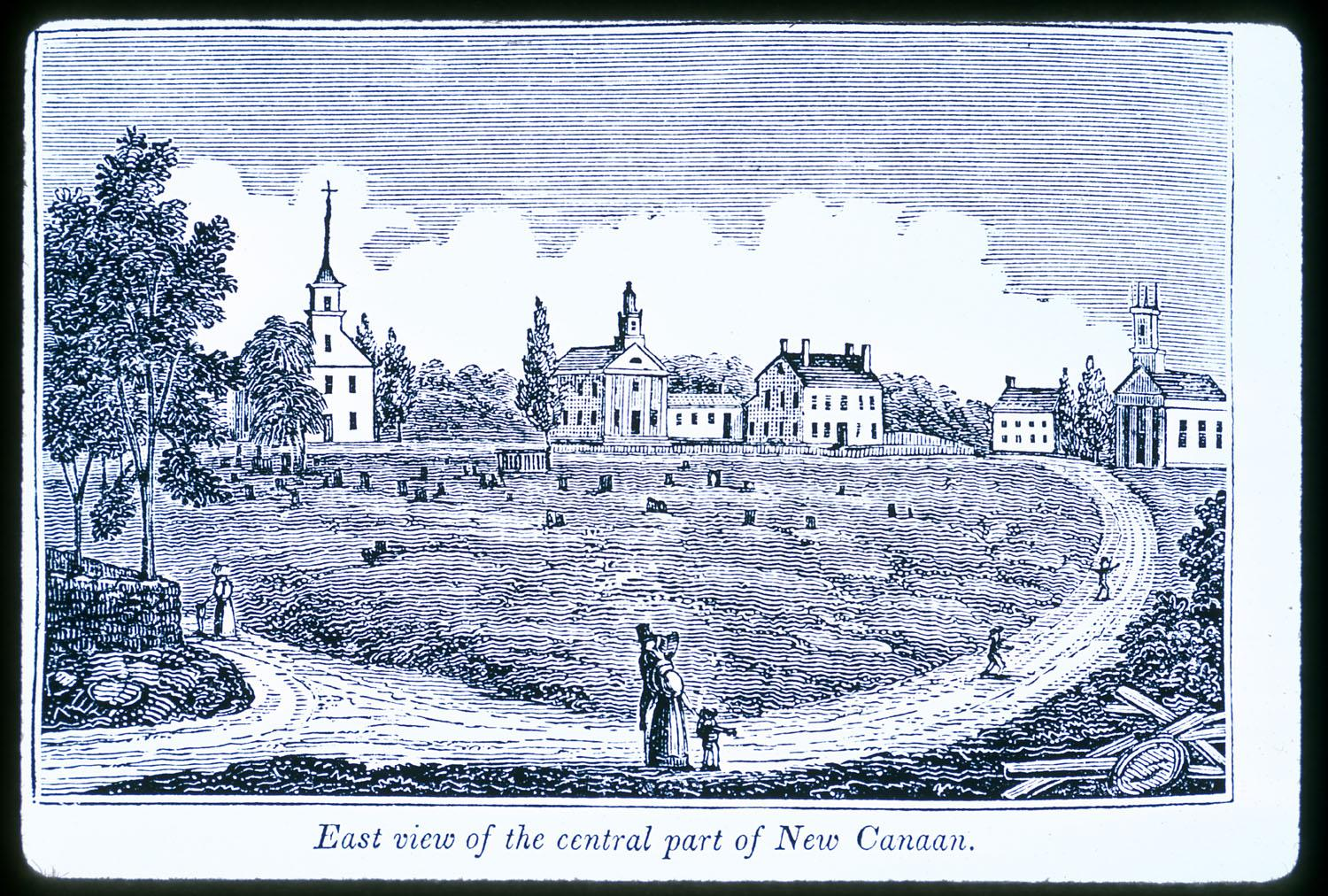
East view of Church Hill, the central part of New Canaan (1836) by John Warner Barber

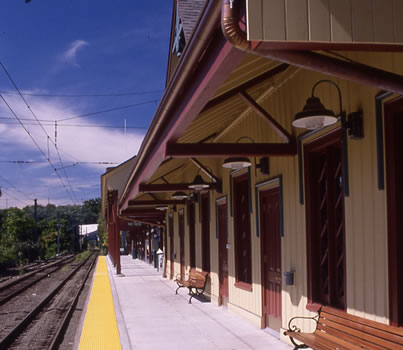
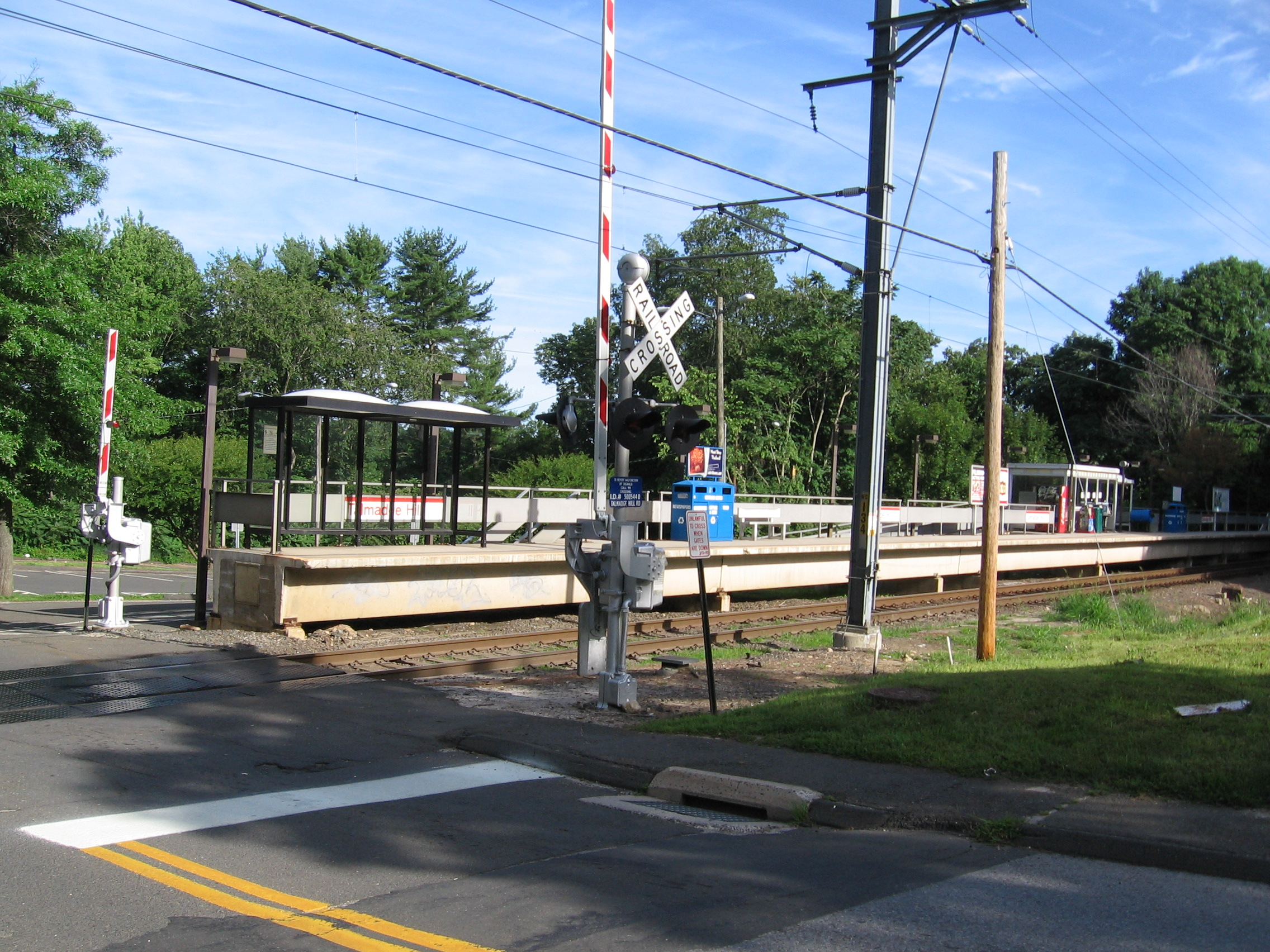
New Canaan station (top) and Talmadge Hill station (bottom) are part of Metro-North Railroad's New Canaan Branch.

In 1731, Connecticut's colonial legislature established Canaan Parish as a religious entity in northwestern Norwalk and northeastern Stamford. The right to form a Congregational church was granted to the few families scattered through the area. As inhabitants of Norwalk or Stamford, Canaan Parish settlers still had to vote, pay some taxes—no income tax, and many other modern taxes did not yet exist—serve on juries, and file deeds in their hometowns. Because Canaan Parish was not planned as a town when it was first settled in 1731, when New Canaan was incorporated in 1801, it found itself without a central common, a main street, or a town hall.

Until the Revolutionary War, New Canaan was primarily an agricultural community; after the war, the town's major industry was shoemaking. As New Canaan's shoe business gathered momentum early in the 19th century, instead of a central village, regional settlements of clustered houses, mill, and school developed into distinct district centers. Some of the districts were centered on Ponus Ridge, West Road, Oenoke Ridge, Smith Ridge, Talmadge Hill, and Silvermine, a pattern that the village gradually outgrew.

With the opening of the New York, New Haven and Hartford Railroad to New Canaan in 1868, many of New York City's wealthy residents discovered the good lifestyle in the area and built summer homes. Eventually, many of the summer visitors settled year-round, commuting to their jobs in New York City.

Lewis Lapham, a founder of Texaco and great-grandfather of long-time Harper's Magazine editor Lewis H. Lapham, spent summers with his family at their estate that is now 300-acre (1.2 km^{2}) Waveny Park next to Talmadge Hill and the Merritt Parkway.

In the 1890s, editor Will Kirk of the Messenger wrote an editorial in response to area editors who chided him, saying New Canaan was the "next station to hell." An alleged remark by a parched Civil War veteran marching in the Decoration Day Parade on an unusually hot day prompted the exchange. The remark was found untrue and Kirk, after enduring the comments of others, wrote about a "dream" of approaching the Pearly Gates in the company of his fellow editors. All others were turned away, but he, Will Kirk, was welcomed, because he, in fact, was from the "Next Station to Heaven." Since then, the name has been controversial, with residents affectionately using the latter, and local critics of New Canaan still using the original nickname.

=== The "Harvard Five" and modern homes ===
New Canaan was an important center of the modern design movement from the late 1940s through roughly the 1960s, when about 80 modern homes were built in town. About 20 have been torn down since then.

"During the late 1940s and 1950s, a group of students and teachers from the Harvard Graduate School of Design migrated to New Canaan ... and rocked the world of architectural design", according to an article in PureContemporary.com, an online architecture design magazine. "Philip Johnson, Marcel Breuer, Landis Gores, John M. Johansen and Eliot Noyes – known as the Harvard Five – began creating homes in a style that emerged as the complete antithesis of the traditional build. Using new materials and open floor plans, best captured by Johnson's Glass House, these treasures are being squandered as buyers are knocking down these architectural icons and replacing them with cookie-cutter new builds."

"Other architects, well-known (Frank Lloyd Wright, for example) and not so well known, also contributed significant modern houses that elicited strong reactions from nearly everyone who saw them and are still astonishing today ... New Canaan came to be the focus of the modern movement's experimentation in materials, construction methods, space, and form", according to an online description of The Harvard Five in New Canaan: Mid-Century Modern Houses, by William D. Earls.

Some other New Canaan architects designing modern homes were Victor Christ-Janer, John Black Lee, Allan Gelbin, and Hugh Smallen.

The film The Ice Storm (1997) shows many of New Canaan's modern houses, both inside and out. The film (and Rick Moody's novel of the same name, upon which it is based) takes place in New Canaan; a mostly glass house situated on Laurel Road is prominently featured.

== Geography ==
According to the United States Census Bureau, the town has a total area of 22.5 square miles (58 km^{2}), of which 22.1 square miles (57 km^{2}) are land and 0.3 square mile (0.78 km^{2}), or 1.56%, is covered by water. New Canaan is the only municipality on the Connecticut Panhandle that does not border the coast. Proximity to New York City proved worthy of its own connection to the New Haven Railroad, making New Canaan the only town with such a branch line. New Canaan station and Talmadge Hill station are both on the New Canaan Branch of the New Haven Line, and transfer is possible in Stamford south to Manhattan. Many New Canaan residents commute to New York regularly, with travel time to Grand Central Terminal around 65 minutes. New Canaan is also heavily served by the historic Merritt Parkway, as the third municipality one traverses when driving through Connecticut from New York City.

The town includes the following sections: New Canaan Town Center, Talmadge Hill, Ponus Ridge, West, Oenoke Ridge, Smith Ridge, and part of Silvermine (which extends into Norwalk and Wilton).

== Demographics ==
Historical population
Census	Pop.	Note	%±
1810	1,599		—
1820	1,689		5.6%
1830	1,830		8.3%
1850	2,600		—
1860	2,771		6.6%
1870	2,497		−9.9%
1880	2,673		7.0%
1890	2,701		1.0%
1900	2,968		9.9%
1910	3,667		23.6%
1920	3,895		6.2%
1930	5,456		40.1%
1940	6,221		14.0%
1950	8,001		28.6%
1960	13,466		68.3%
1970	17,451		29.6%
1980	17,931		2.8%
1990	17,864		−0.4%
2000	19,395		8.6%
2010	19,738		1.8%
2020	20,622		4.5%
U.S. Decennial Census

As of the census of 2000, 19,395 people, 6,822 households, and 5,280 families were residing in the town. The population density was 876.5 inhabitants per square mile (338.4/km^{2}). The 7,141 housing units averaged 322.7 per square mile (124.6/km^{2}). The racial makeup of the town was 95.27% White, 1.04% African American, 0.04% Native American, 2.29% Asian, 0.39% from other races, and 0.98% from two or more races. Hispanics or Latinos of any race were 1.74% of the population.

Of the 6,822 households, 41.7% had children under the age of 18 living with them, 69.2% were married couples living together, 6.6% had a female householder with no husband present, and 22.6% were not families. About 19.4% of all households were made up of individuals, and 9.3% had someone living alone who was 65 years of age or older. The average household size was 2.83, and the average family size was 3.26.

In the town, the population was distributed as 31.2% under the age of 18, 3.3% from 18 to 24, 25.4% from 25 to 44, 26.6% from 45 to 64, and 13.5% who were 65 years of age or older. The median age was 40 years. For every 100 females, there were 91.2 males. For every 100 females age 18 and over, there were 85.7 males.

Per the 2000 Census, the median income for a household in the town was $141,788, and for a family was $175,331. Males had a median income of $100,000 versus $53,924 for females. The per capita income for the town was $82,049. About 1.4% of families and 2.5% of the population were below the poverty line, including 2.2% of those under age 18 and 2.2% of those age 65 or over.

Between 2010 and 2020, the population in New Canaan, increased by 4.5%. Specifically, it went from 19,738 residents to 20,622. This represents an increase of 884 residents over a period of ten years. Overall, Connecticut's population increased by 0.9% during this time period. The population of adults specifically, increased from 13,409 in 2010 to 14,574 in 2020. This is an increase of 8.7%. On the other hand, the number of residents who were under 18, decreased from 6,329 to 6,048. This represented a 4.4% decrease.

According to the New Canaan census page in the housing section, the 2020-2024 American Community Survey estimated that there were 7,153 households, each with an average of 2.91 residents. The 2020-2024 American Community survey stated that New Canaan's median age was 42.1 years old.

In 2020, 17,169 non- Hispanic White residents were living in New Canaan, making up 83% of the population overall. There were 1,159 Non-Hispanic Asian residents, which made up around 6% of the population. There were around 1,121 Latino residents making up 5% of the population. Lastly, there were 244 non-Hispanic Black residents which made up for 1% of the population. DataHaven states that people of color represented around 17% of the population in New Canaan in comparison to 37% in Connecticuts population.

Additionally, DataHaven reported in the 2021 equity profile that there were 7,116 households in New Canaan. 79% of these homes were owned, whereas throughout Connecticut, 66% were owned. The town had 7,655 housing units, 82% being single-family and 18% being multi-family. Around 36% of New Canaan's housing spent at least 30% of their income on their housing. DataHaven describes this spending as "cost-burdened".

DataHaven also explored the educational attainment throughout New Canaan. For adults 25 and older, 80% held a Bachelors degree or higher degree.Around 2% of this age group did not have a high school diploma. At the time, this number was 9% throughout all of Connecticut.

In this report, New Canaan's household income averaged around $190,227 whereas it was $78,444 throughout all of Connecticut. Around 646 residents, making up 3% of the population, lived below the poverty level. This number was 10% throughout Connecticut. Also, there were 236 households throughout the town that received aid from the Supplemental Nutrition Assistance Program which represented around 3% of all households.

Lastly, around 2,676 residents in New Canaan were born out of the country, making up 13% of the population. In 2019, around 742 residents from ages five and older, did not speak English well, representing 4% of the population. In 2020-2024, the US Census Bureau stated that around 3.7% of New Canaan residents were living below the line of poverty. Additionally, during the same time, 16.9% of residents that were ages five and over spoke a language that was not English at home.

== Arts and culture ==
=== Points of interest ===
- New Canaan Nature Center
- Waveny Park on South Avenue was developed in 1912 by Lewis Lapham on what had been Prospect Farm, an early summer estate. In 1967 the Town acquired the 'castle' (Lapham's mansion on the property) and 300 acres (1.2 km^{2}) of surrounding parkland."
- Silvermine Arts Center

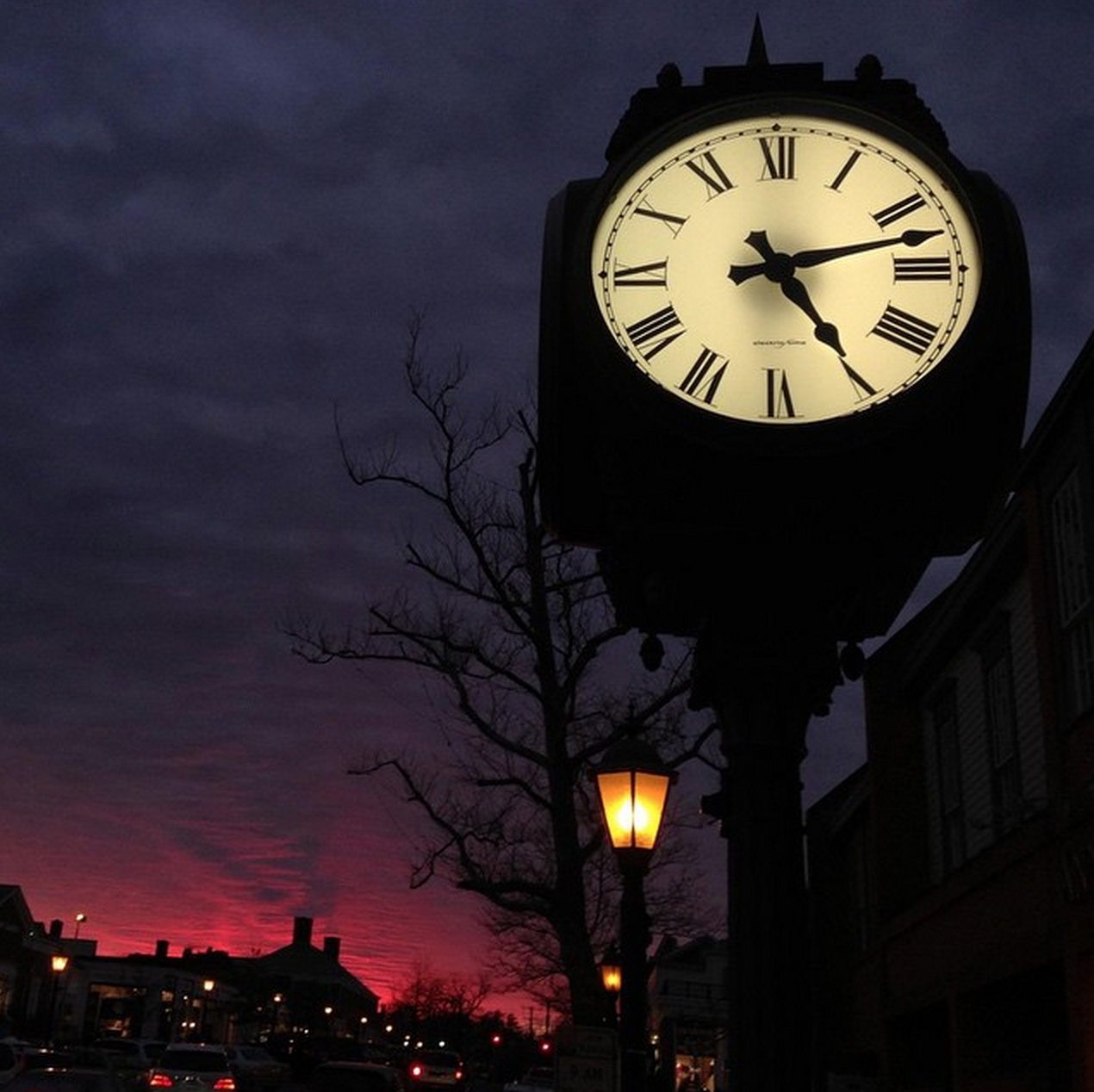
Moreno Clock located on Elm Street where it meets with South Avenue in New Canaan

=== National Register of Historic Places ===
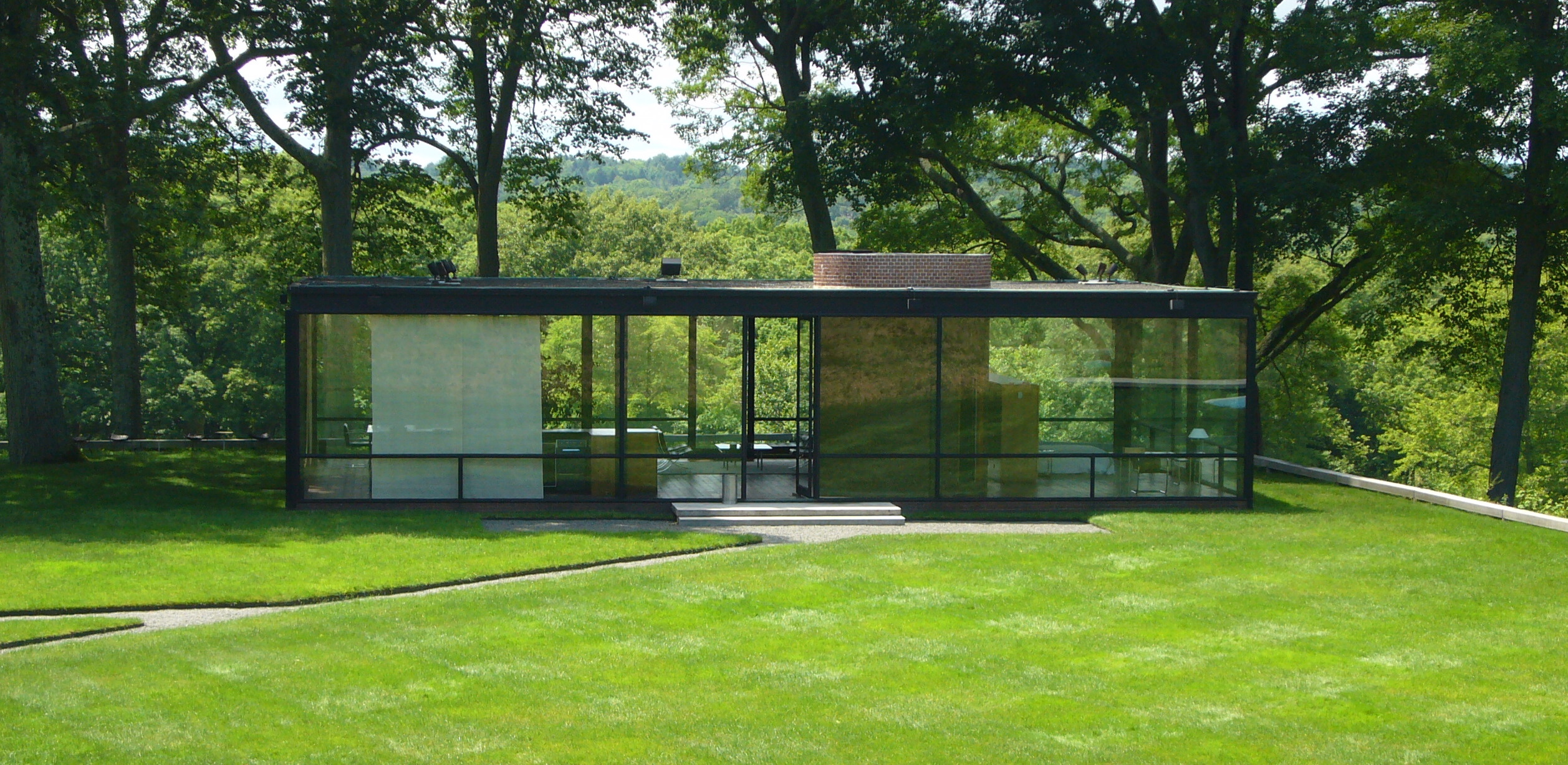
The Glass House

- Hampton Inn – 179 Oenoke Ridge; also known as The Maples Inn, which was built by the Elwood brothers in Queen Anne, Colonial Revival style. (added November 27, 2004)
- Hanford Davenport House – 353 Oenoke Ridge (added September 3, 1989)
- John Rogers Studio – 33 Oenoke Ridge; built in 1878 by John Rogers, who was called "the people's sculptor" in the late 19th century. The studio houses a collection of the artist's famous groups of statuary, many sculpted on site (added November 15, 1966). "He used this studio from 1876 to the end of his life. The John Rogers studio houses one of the finest collections of Rogers Groups in the nation."
- Landis Gores House – 192 Cross Ridge Road "With its flat-roofed single-story form, full-height glass walls, and emphasis on horizontal planes, the house he designed for himself in New Canaan is an outstanding example" of modernist architecture. (added April 21, 2002)
- Maxwell Evants Perkins House – 63 Park Street (added June 6, 2004)
- Philip Johnson Glass House – 798–856 Ponus Ridge Road (added March 18, 1997)
- Richard and Geraldine Hodgson House – 881 Ponus Ridge Road (added February 28, 2005)

=== Seasonal events ===
New Canaan Nature Center Fall Fair: The fair offers activities for all ages from hay mazes to Old Faithful Antique Fire Truck rides to apple sling shots.

All Hallows Eve (Halloween) Parade: Children of all ages and their dogs can receive a goody bag and march in the Parade led by the Old Faithful Antique Fire Truck which is sponsored by the New Canaan Chamber of Commerce.

Holiday Stroll: Hosted by The Chamber of Commerce, downtown New Canaan celebrates with Christmas carolers, the lighting of the trees along Elm Street, the arrival of Santa Claus, and extended store hours.

Christmas Carolling on God's Acre: since 1919 New Canaan residents have been gathering on God's Acre every Christmas Eve to sing Christmas carols with the New Canaan Town Band. The New Canaan town band was founded in 1831 and is the second oldest town band in the United States.

Easter Egg Hunt: At the Annual Town Easter Egg Hunt, sponsored by the Young Women's League of New Canaan, children are able to collect candy-filled Easter eggs, get their faces painted, take pictures with the Easter bunny, and participate in many other festive activities.

Saint Mark's May Fair: Provides carnival rides and May Fair's famous strawberry shortcake.

Family Fourth Fireworks: Town residents gather at Waveny Town Park for picnicking, live music, bounce houses, and fireworks.

Juneteenth "Hearts of Freedom" Community Celebration put on by Stand Together Against Racism (S.T.A.R) annually on June 19 on the lawn of the New Canaan Historical Society. Features live music, local black-owned food trucks, kids activities and is free to attend. https://www.star-ct.org/juneteenth

=== Institutions and organizations ===
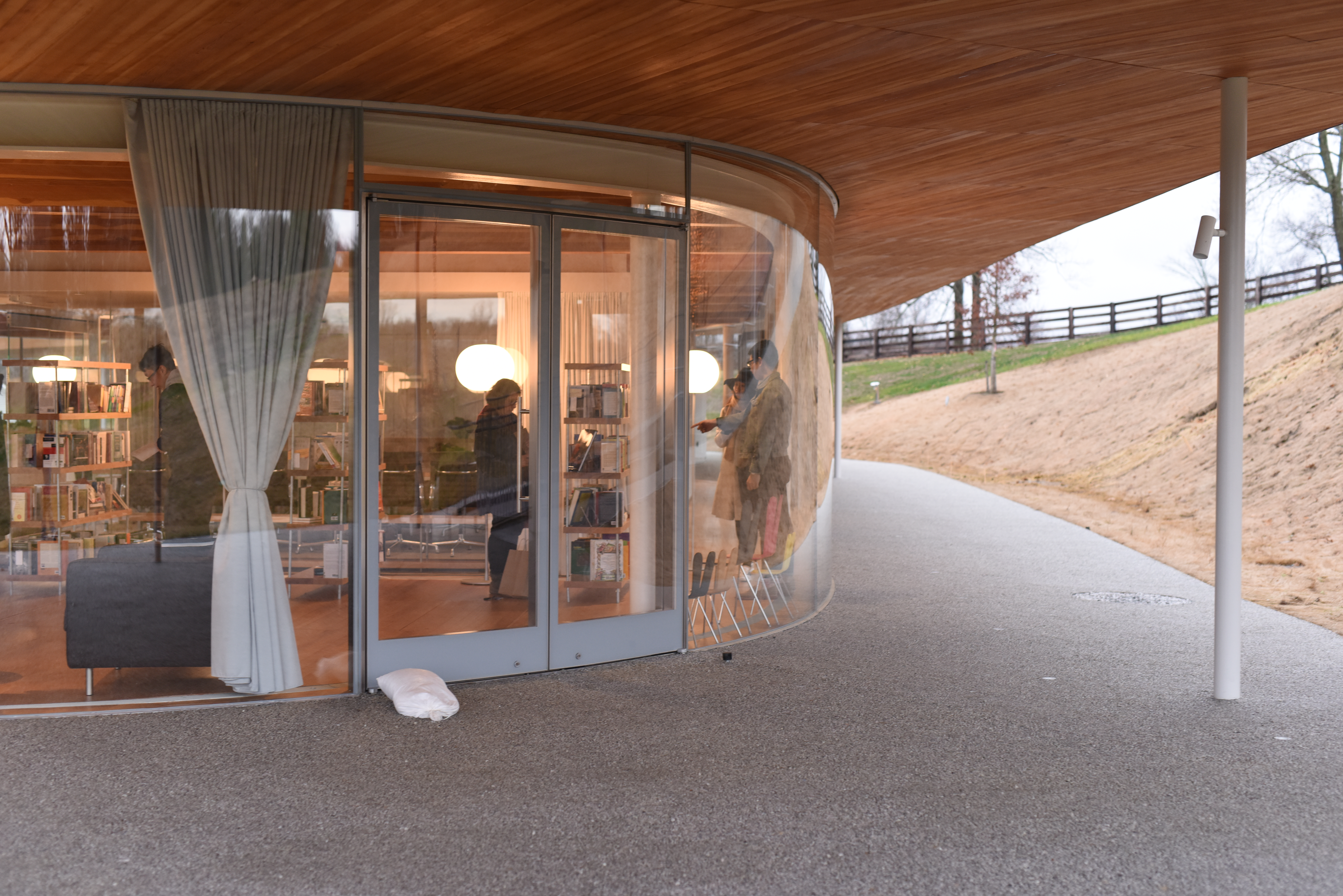
Grace Farms, a cultural and humanitarian center in New Canaan.

- New Canaan Museum & Historical Society – operates seven museums, preserves five historic buildings, collects and preserves material thought to be of local historical value, and supports education programs such as school tours, special exhibits, seminars and publications on New Canaan history. The society was founded in 1889 and is housed in New Canaan's first town hall.
- Harmony Lodge No. 67 Ancient, Free & Accepted Masons – the oldest voluntary society in the Town of New Canaan. It was chartered by the Most Worshipful Grand Lodge of the State of Connecticut and, with its establishment in 1763, became the first masonic lodge in lower Fairfield County. The only masonic lodges in the area at that time were Union Lodge No. 5 of Stamford and St. John's No. 6 in Norwalk. This meant that the brothers of Canaan Parish, prior to 1825, had to meet either at Union No. 5, which often physically met at Greenwich, Stamford, and sometimes Bedford, NY or at St. John's No. 6 in Norwalk. Once Canaan Parish was incorporated into a separate town, Brothers Samuel Carter, Jr., John Seely, Eliphalet Weed and several other members, requested the recommendation of St. John's Lodge No. 6 in Norwalk to the Grand Lodge for a charter to establish a new lodge in the Town of New Canaan which was granted on May 30, 1825. In 1954, the Lodge, in a three-way swap, bought the old Methodist Church building on Main Street, and Harmony Lodge No. 67 has been at this site ever since.
- New Canaan Society (NCS) - a nationwide movement of over 24,000 men who gather to encourage each other in friendship and faith, aiming to support one another in becoming better husbands, fathers, and leaders in their communities and workplaces.
- Silvermine Arts Center
- New Canaan Red Cross
- New Canaan Land Trust
- New Canaan Library
- Grace Farms

== Government ==
=== United States Congress ===
Senators	Name	Party	Assumed office	Level
Senate Class 1	Richard Blumenthal	Democratic	2011	Senior Senator
Senate Class 3	Chris Murphy	Democratic	2013	Junior Senator
Representatives	Name	Party	Assumed office	
District 4	Jim Himes	Democratic	2009	

=== Connecticut General Assembly ===
==== Connecticut State Senate ====
District	Name	Party	Assumed office
26	Ceci Maher	Democratic	2023
36	Ryan Fazio	Republican	2021

==== Connecticut House of Representatives ====
District	Name	Party	Assumed office
42	Keith Denning	Democratic	2023
125	Tom O'Dea	Republican	2013
142	Lucy Dathan	Democratic	2019

=== Local government ===
New Canaan is led by a First Selectman, who is one of three members of the Board of Selectmen. As of November 2023, the First Selectman is Republican Dionna Carlson.

The legislative body of the town is a twelve-member Town Council.

=== Taxes ===
In 2023, the mill rate of New Canaan was 18.372.

=== Politics ===
New Canaan was one of five towns in Connecticut that backed former Governor John Kasich of Ohio over Donald Trump in the 2016 Republican presidential primary. Kasich received 1,362 votes (47.84%) ahead of Trump, who garnered 1,168 votes (41.03%). U.S. Senator Ted Cruz of Texas finished third with 262 votes (9.20%).

New Canaan was historically a Republican stronghold. However, the town has trended Democratic in recent elections. The town swung from a 64% win for Mitt Romney in 2012 to a 52% win for Hillary Clinton in 2016. This change mirrored a national trend of suburban voters turning away from Donald Trump. In 2020, Joe Biden won New Canaan over Trump by a margin of nearly 20 points. Despite a rightward shift in 2024, town voters still delivered a victory to Kamala Harris of roughly 13 percentage points.

Registration and Party Enrollment Statistics as of October 31, 2023
Party	Active voters	Inactive voters	Total voters	Percentage
Republican	5,051	634	5,685	36.23%
Democratic	3,750	445	4,195	26.74%
Unaffiliated	4,903	713	5,616	35.80%
Minor parties	158	35	193	1.23%
Total	13,862	1,827	15,689	100%

New Canaan town vote by party in presidential elections
Year	Democratic	Republican	Third Parties
2024	55.49% 6,014	42.44% 4,600	2.06% 224
2020	59.02% 7,298	39.26% 4,855	1.72% 212
2016	52.59% 5,767	41.41% 4,541	6.00% 658
2012	35.02% 3,804	64.13% 6,966	0.85% 92
2008	46.61% 5,187	52.81% 5,877	0.58% 64
2004	38.32% 4,180	60.67% 6,618	1.01% 110
2000	33.93% 3,516	62.73% 6,501	3.34% 346
1996	32.37% 3,087	61.77% 5,890	5.86% 559
1992	30.72% 3,438	56.21% 6,292	13.07% 1,463
1988	27.14% 2,831	72.09% 7,520	0.77% 80
1984	23.66% 2,564	76.12% 8,249	0.22% 24
1980	19.87% 2,102	67.31% 7,120	12.82% 1,356
1976	28.17% 2,887	71.52% 7,329	0.31% 32
1972	29.50% 2,915	69.85% 6,903	0.66% 65
1968	31.96% 2,802	66.12% 5,796	1.92% 168
1964	52.50% 4,022	47.50% 3,639	0.00% 0
1960	27.95% 1,970	72.05% 5,079	0.00% 0
1956	20.33% 1,213	79.67% 4,755	0.00% 0
1952	24.98% 1,276	73.81% 3,771	1.21% 62
1948	23.03% 942	74.18% 3,035	2.79% 114
1944	31.14% 1,163	68.86% 2,571	0.00% 0
1940	28.46% 1,015	71.54% 2,552	0.00% 0
1936	35.98% 940	64.02% 1,673	0.00% 0
1932	33.97% 746	66.03% 1,450	0.00% 0
1928	31.95% 614	67.53% 1,298	0.52% 10
1924	20.63% 293	75.07% 1,066	4.30% 61
1920	21.55% 267	76.52% 948	1.93% 24
1916	33.73% 254	65.07% 490	1.20% 9
1912	34.32% 266	44.52% 345	21.16% 164
1908	24.89% 171	74.68% 513	0.43% 3
1904	31.01% 192	67.53% 418	1.46% 9
1900	31.67% 190	67.50% 405	0.83% 5
1896	22.45% 139	73.99% 458	3.56% 22
1892	44.25% 277	52.72% 330	3.03% 19
1888	43.07% 264	51.88% 318	5.05% 31
1884	46.24% 264	53.76% 307	0.00% 0
1880	48.46% 300	51.54% 319	0.00% 0
1876	51.27% 323	48.73% 307	0.00% 0
1872	52.78% 285	47.22% 255	0.00% 0
1868	43.39% 233	56.61% 304	0.00% 0
1864	40.80% 206	59.20% 299	0.00% 0
1860	27.86% 190	45.16% 308	26.98% 184
1856	38.90% 198	61.10% 311	0.00% 0
1852	55.11% 221	44.89% 180	0.00% 0
1848	44.52% 195	42.01% 184	13.47% 59
1844	50.22% 225	49.78% 223	0.00% 0
1840	48.78% 220	51.22% 231	0.00% 0
1836	48.19% 93	51.81% 100	0.00% 0
1832	17.36% 29	58.69% 98	23.95% 40
1828	2.38% 2	97.62% 82	0.00% 0

== Education ==
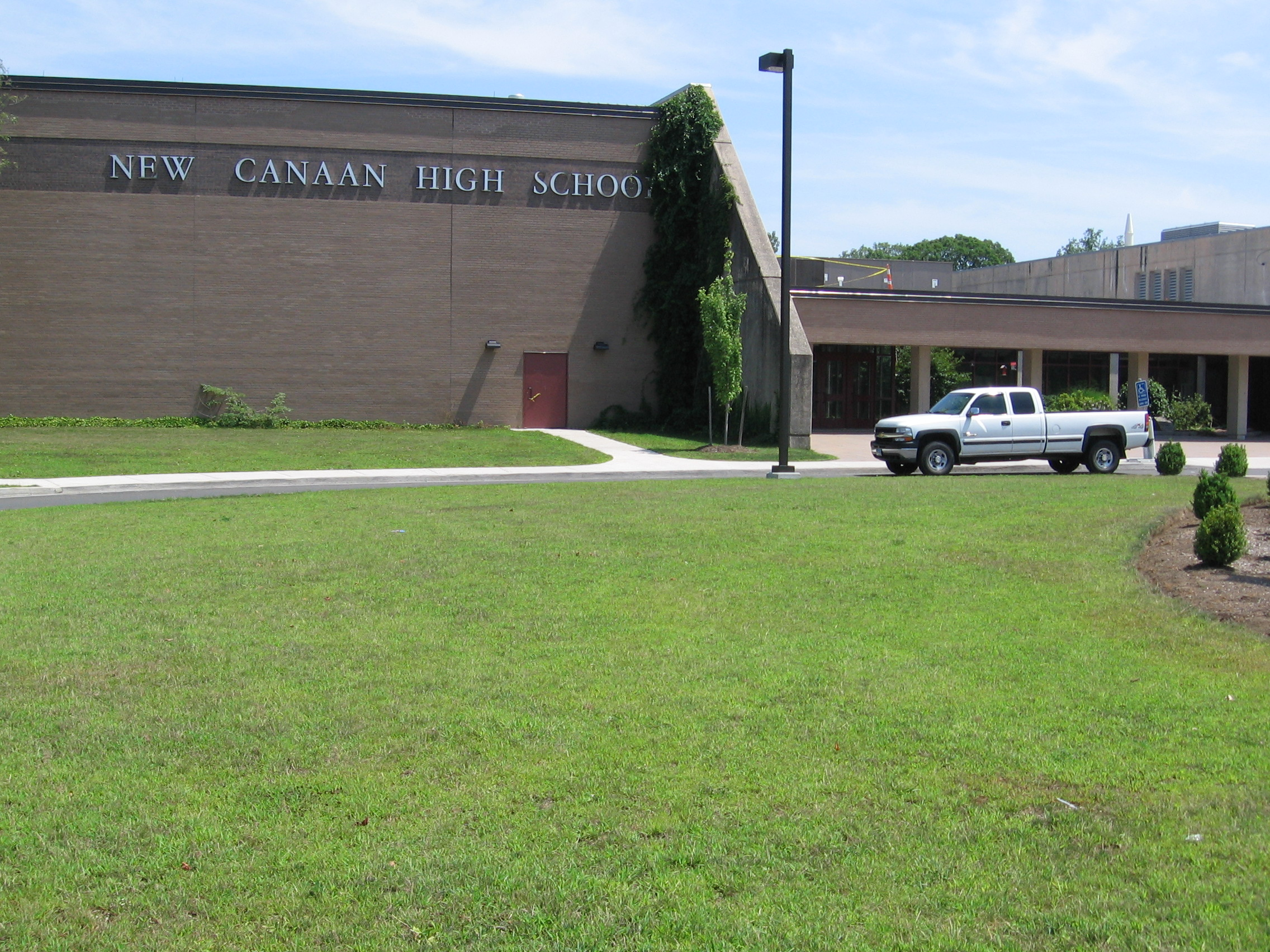
New Canaan High School

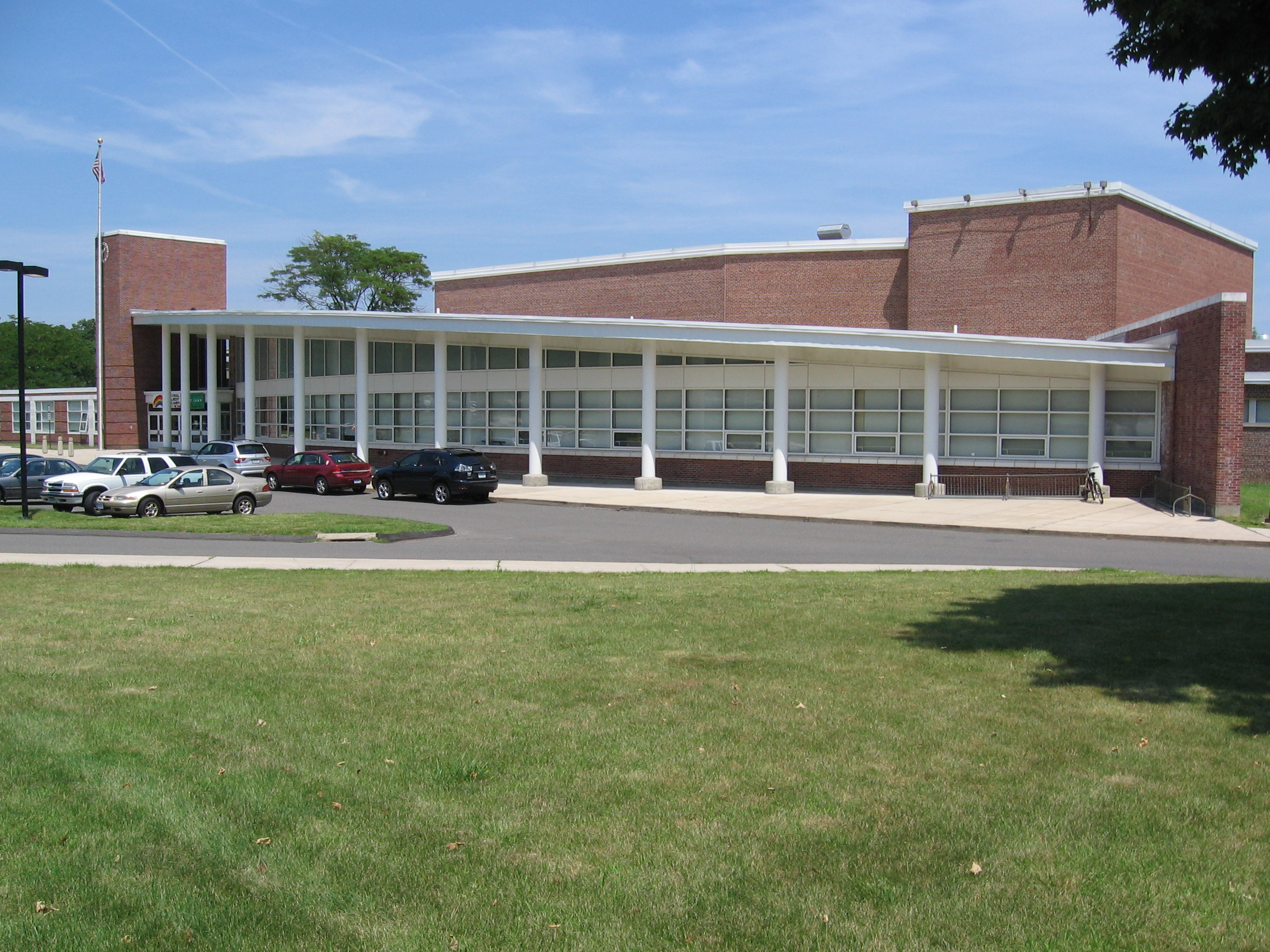
Saxe Middle School

New Canaan has five public schools:

- Elementary Schools: West School, South School, and East School
- Middle School: Saxe Middle School
- High School: New Canaan High School

New Canaan also has two private schools:

- St. Luke's School: 5–12
- New Canaan Country School: Pre-K–9

St. Aloysius School, once a K–8 Catholic school, closed in 2023 due to low enrollment.

== Media ==
The town newspaper is the New Canaan Advertiser. Other daily newspapers which serve the area include Connecticut Post and Greenwich Time.

== Infrastructure ==
=== Emergency services ===
==== Emergency medical services ====
New Canaan Emergency Medical Services, founded in 1975 as New Canaan Volunteer Ambulance Corps, is a free, all-volunteer ambulance corps with three ambulances and two paramedic fly-cars. EMTs are all volunteers, while paramedic services are contracted from Norwalk Hospital.

==== Fire department ====
The New Canaan Fire Department employs the professional firefighters of the New Canaan Fire Department and the volunteers of the New Canaan Fire Company, No. 1. Founded in 1881, the New Canaan Fire Department is a combination professional/volunteer fire department that operates out of a fire station located near the center of town, with a fire apparatus fleet of engines and other vehicles. The New Canaan Fire Department responded to 1,133 calls for service in 2023. The New Canaan Fire Department was featured on Rescue 911 when they saved a fire captain who was suffering a heart attack.

==== Police department ====
The New Canaan Police Department has fifty sworn officers, five full-time civilians, and two school crossing guards. The department responded to 16,741 calls during 2012.

== In popular culture ==
=== Film ===
Movies at least partially filmed in, or involving, New Canaan:

- The Stepford Wives (2004)
- The Ice Storm (1997)
- Gentleman's Agreement (1947)

=== Books ===
- The Ice Storm (1994)

== Gallery ==
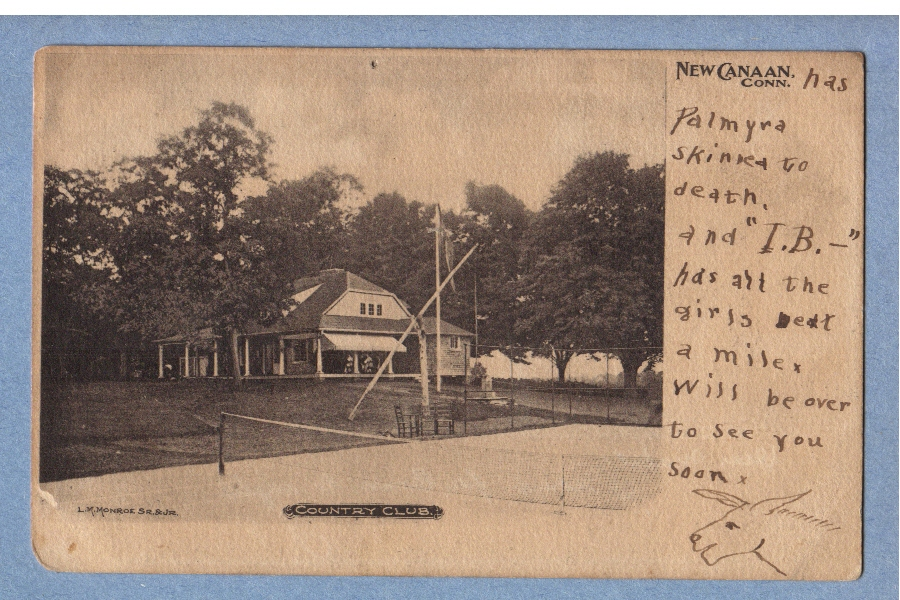
Postcard of The Country Club, c. 1906

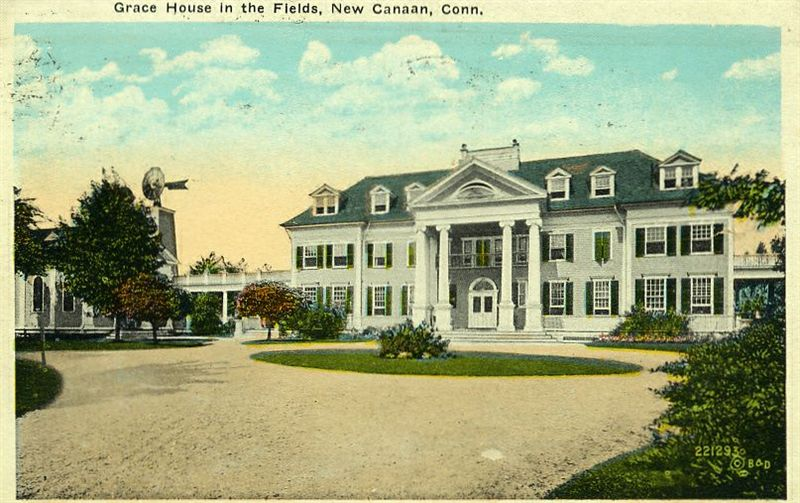
Grace House in the Fields, c. 1915

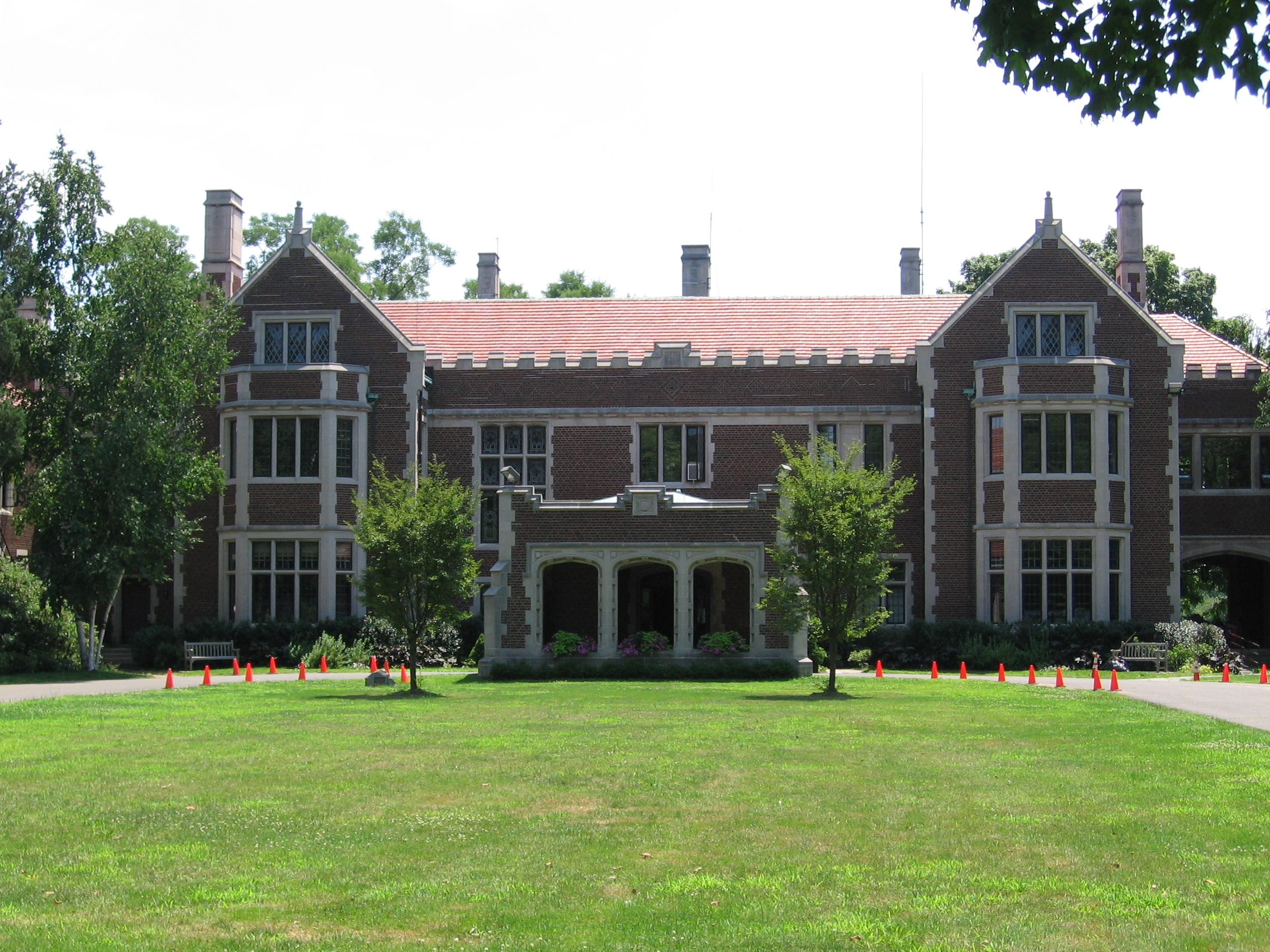
Waveny mansion in Waveny Park

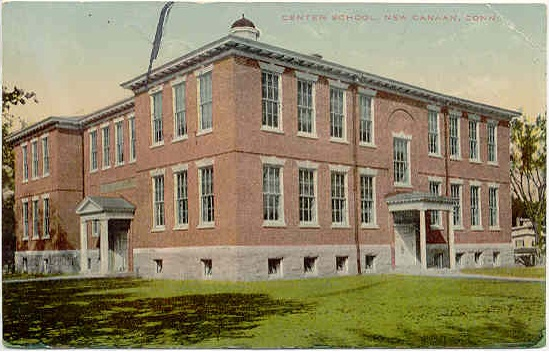
Center School, c. 1912 (now demolished)

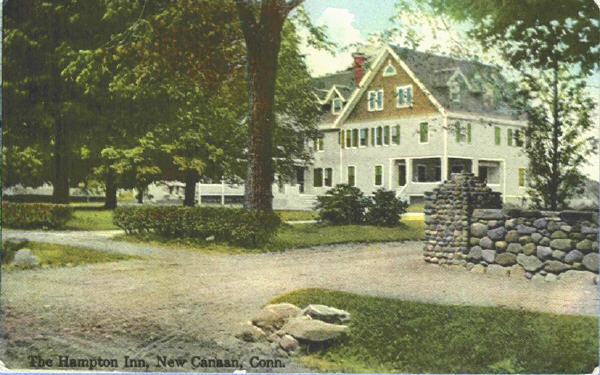
Hampton Inn, c. 1909
