= Government and politics of Darien, Connecticut =

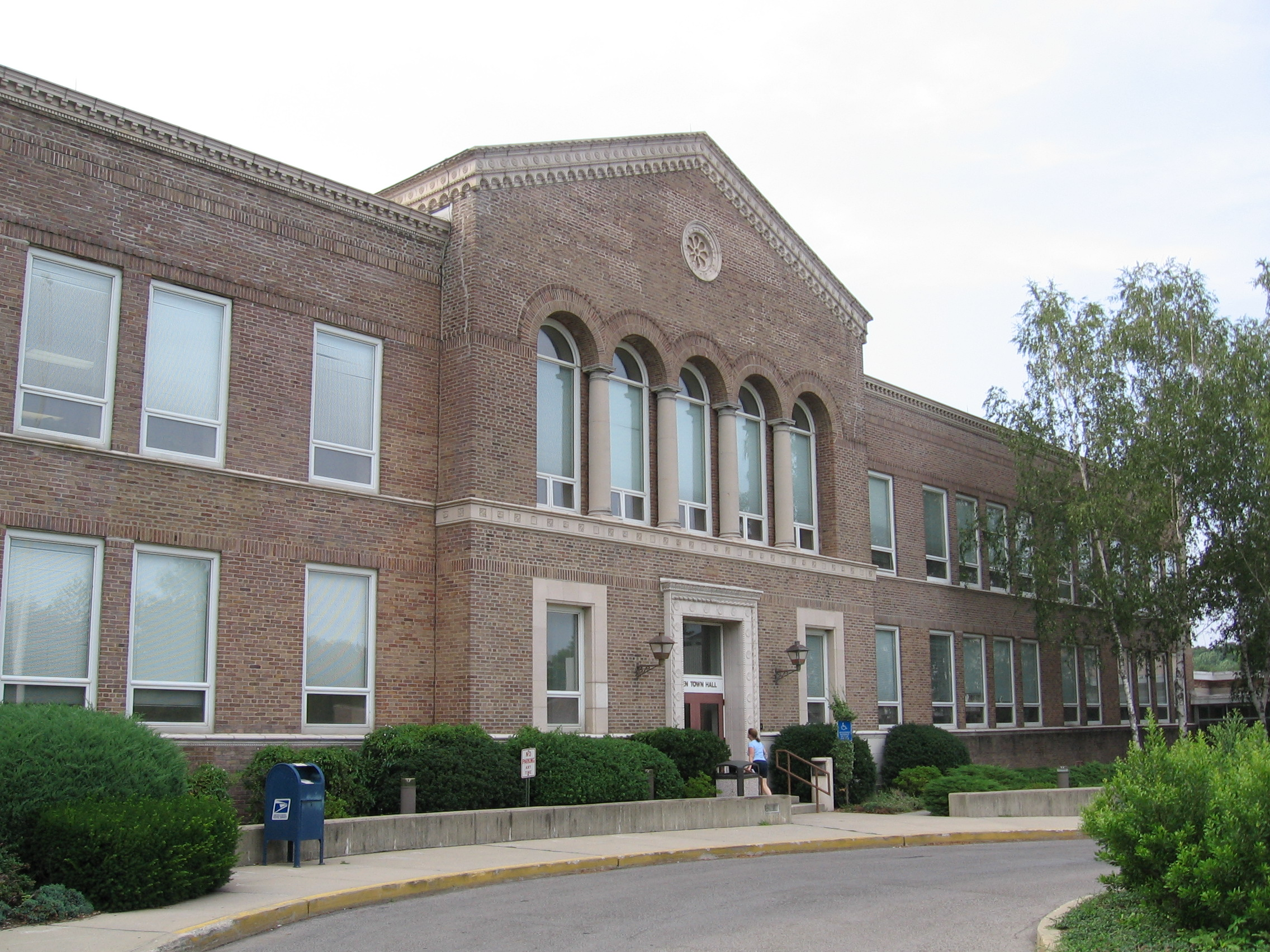
Town Hall, former High School and former Mather Junior High School, dedicated October 28, 1984

The government and politics of Darien, Connecticut take place in a historically overwhelmingly Republican, upper-middle class coastal town with a Triple-A bond rating, and a tax base made up of wealthy homes, country clubs (some of the largest taxpayers), and some office buildings. Although modern Darien is largely a Manhattan suburb, its local government has more in common with traditional New England roots than New York.

As of August 1, 2006 the town Grand List (list of taxable property) amounted to $6.33 billion.

The Cablevision Channel 79 is the town Government-access television (GATV) cable TV channel for town residents to see meetings of local government boards and commissions.

== Charter ==

In 1951, the town switched from an annual town meeting to a representative town meeting, which was considered more practical because of the growth of the town's population. In 1959, the state Legislature passed a special act allowing the town to consolidate all laws affecting the structure of its government into "A Special Act Consolidating Certain Special Acts Concerning the Town of Darien", now usually referred to as the town Charter.

Unique to Connecticut, Darien's town Charter "may be amended by action of the Representative Town Meeting (RTM) after a public hearing, a sixty-day delay, and an affirmative vote of a majority of the full membership of the RTM," according to the Darien League of Women Voters.

== Appointed boards and commissions ==
=== Land use boards ===
- Zoning Board of Appeals — five members appointed by the Board of Selectmen
- Environmental Protection Commission — seven members appointed by the Board of Selectmen
- Architectural Review Board — seven members appointed by the Board of Selectmen

=== Other appointed boards and volunteer posts ===
- Commission on Aging
- Beautification Commission
- Building Board of Appeals
- Cable TV Advisory Commission
- Advisory Commission on Coastal Waters
- Deer Management Committee
- Board of Ethics (chosen from members
  of the Representative Town Meeting)
- Five Mile River Commission (two members from
  Darien chosen by the governor of Connecticut)
- Information Technology Committee
- Monuments and Ceremonies Committee
- Operations Planning Committee — made up of
  the four chairmen of major town boards (first selectman,
  chairman of the board of finance, chairman of the Board of
  Education, chairman of the Planning
  and Zoning Commission) the RTM moderator and the
  town administrator.
- Parks and Recreation Commission
- Parking Ticket Hearing Officers
- Police Commission
- Police Pension Board
- Selectmen's Emergency Management Committee
- Sewer Commission
- Commissioners of Social Services
- SWRPA (Southwestern Regional Planning Agency) representatives
- Town Historian
- Town Pension Board
- Youth Commission — seven adults appointed by the Board of Selectmen,
  along with a full-time youth director and a Youth Advisory Committee
  made up of eight to 15 high school-aged teenagers.

== Town departments and offices ==
=== Town employees hired by the Board of Selectmen ===
Nine paid officers of the town are hired by the Board of Selectmen, usually for a specific term. They are:

- Administrative Officer — indefinite term
- Building Official — four-year term
- Finance Officer — indefinite term
- Fire Marshall — indefinite term
- Health Director — four-year term
- Park and Recreation Administrator — four-year term
- Public Works Director — indefinite term
- Tax Assessor — three-year term
- Town Counsel — two-year term

=== Public safety agencies and departments ===
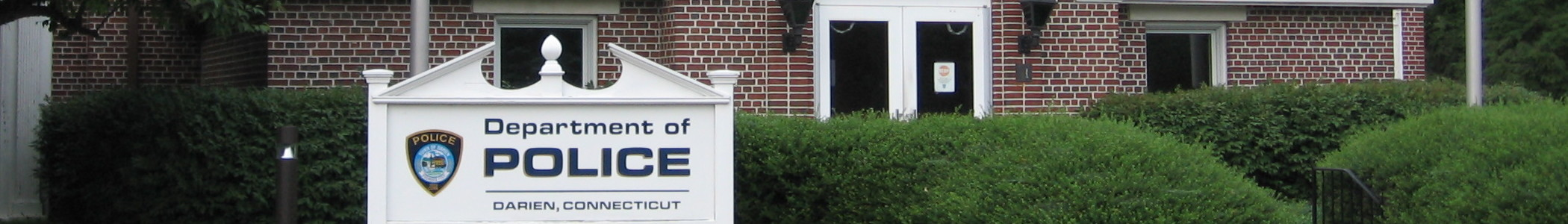
Police Department

In 2005, the town police department responded to 20,030 incidents, including 595 motor vehicle accidents, 1,766 motor vehicle infractions, and issued 254 traffic tickets and 1,150 traffic warnings. Police made 104 arrests for driving under the influence and received reports of 152 larcenies, 27 burglaries, three attempted burglaries, 82 incidents of vandalism, 19 assaults and six motor vehicle thefts. Police made 33 larceny arrests, 10 for burglary, 11 for vandalism, 15 for assault. No robberies, rapes, arsons or murders were reported in 2005.

The town received 1,675 false alarms in 2005, two actual alarms, 304 alarms that were canceled and 17 caused by weather.

The Town of Darien has three fire departments, all of which are staffed entirely by volunteers. These departments respond to all types of calls, including fire, electrical, CO alarms, motor vehicle accidents, downed power lines, cold water rescues, and any problem in the Long Island Sound.

==== Noroton Heights Fire Department ====
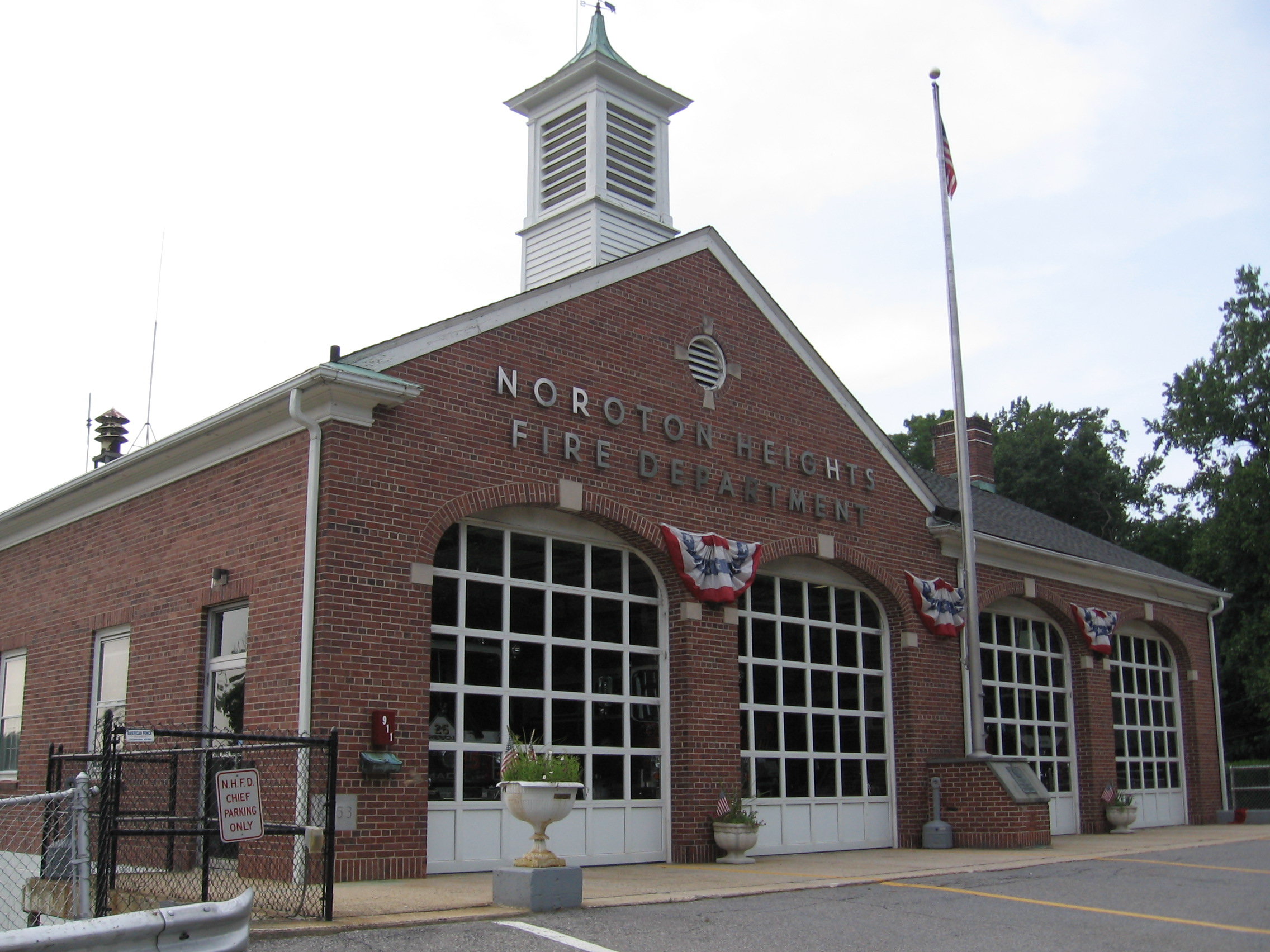
Department headquarters

Founded 1903, the Noroton Heights Fire Department has about 150 members. "NHFD" is located on Noroton Avenue, and covers the northern part of Darien, including part of Interstate 95. Noroton Heights has a fleet of 5 active apparatus, including 2 Mack Engines, (21 and 23) 1 1988 Mack Quint, (20) which serves as their first due unit on most structural calls, a 1975 Mack Tanker, (22) and a 1989 Mack Rescue. Noroton Heights also has a Utility Truck, Truck 24, which is a 1991 Chevy Silverado, and a Chief's Car, Unit 200.

==== Noroton Fire Department ====
Founded in 1896, NFD has 140 members, of whom about 35 are active. NFD is located on Boston Post Road, and covers the smallest portion of Darien out of the 3 departments. Noroton covers the southern part of the Town of Darien, covering all the way down to the Stamford line. NFD currently has an active fleet of 5 apparatus: Engine 32, a 2002 Marion Pumper, which is first due on all structural calls and motor vehicle accidents. Engine 31, a 1972 open cab Maxim pumper, which is Noroton's second due engine. Ladder 30, a 1994 Sutphen Aerial, nicknamed "The Big Stick," for its 104' aerial. Rescue 33, a 1988 International Marion Medium Duty Rescue. NFD also operates the only firefighting and rescue capable marine unit in the town of Darien. Marine Unit 34 allows Noroton to respond year-round to the various types of emergencies that occur on Long Island Sound, and responds frequently to mutual aid calls from surrounding towns, and is in service year round. Noroton also has a Utility Truck, Truck 35, a 2001 Ford F-350.

In the late 1950s, the fire department was used for a "Lucky Strike" cigarettes advertising campaign. In a magazine ad, two firefighters are shown, cigarettes in their mouths, pausing as they wash fire engines in front of the building. A message in small type at the top of the advertisement asks smokers to "take care with cigarettes".

==== Darien Fire Department ====
Founded in 1895, covers the eastern side of town, encompassing about 45 percent of the land area. The Noroton Heights and Darien Fire Departments cover a portion of Interstate 95 from exits 9 southbound to exit 13/14 northbound, one of the most disaster-prone stretches of highway in the country. Darien has a fleet of 5 active apparatus in their "barn". Darien operates twin Pierce Enforcer Pumpers, Engines 41 and 42, which replaced the previous Mack engines in 2006. Darien recently replaced its 1971 Mack Tower Ladder, the first aerialscope ever to be used in Connecticut, with a 2011 Seagrave 75' Tower Ladder built using the same boom as the original ladder. Darien also operates a 2004 Saulsbury Custom Heavy Rescue, and a 1996 Mack Tanker. Darien additionally utilizes a 2002 Chevy Silverado as Utility Truck 46, and a Chief's car, Car 40, which was donated by a local resident in 2011. Also stored in Darien's firehouse is a 1928 Ahrens Fox Pumper, which is no longer in service, although still very active in parades.

==== Fire Marshal's Office ====
Established in 1980 as a full-time office, the agency works with the three volunteer fire departments in town and conducts annual inspections of all buildings (except one- and two-family houses), investigates fires, plans review and construction inspections of all buildings (except one- and two-family houses), conducts fire-prevention education programs, issues permits for blasting and tank removals, inspects and certifies hazardous material transport vehicles housed in town, inspects and certifies all day-care centers, nursery schools, convalescent centers and establishments with liquor permits, among other duties.

=== Other town departments ===
- Assessor's Office — sets values on all real and personal property in order to establish the town "Grand List" (a list of taxable property). The town has more than 7,100 real estate parcels and more than 18,000 taxable motor vehicles as well as more than 1,000 payers of "business personal property" taxes (taxes on business assets).
- Building Department — composed of the building official, an assistant building official, an office administrator, a secretary and a part-time building official.
- Finance Department
- Health Department — conducts inspections of food-service establishments. In the 2005–2006 fiscal year there were 106 establishments with licenses in addition to 48 temporary food services which received licenses. The department also inspects and issues permits for the installation and repair of all subsurface sewage disposal systems, reviews house plans to determine compliance with the state septic code, inspects local cosmetology shops and the town's nine public swimming pools, monitors water quality near beaches, issues shellfishing permits, conducts education programs, blood-pressure screenings, influenza clinics, and makes radon test kits available to residents.
- Human Resources Department
- Information Technology Department
- Darien Library — the town government funds library operating expenses, including salaries, but the Library board of trustees oversees fundraising to buy books and other marterial.
- Parks and Recreation Department — manages and maintains 12 town-owned parks with a total of 209 acres (0.85 km^{2}).
- Planning and Zoning Department — the staff of six employees provides support to the Planning and Zoning Commission, the Zoning Board of Appeals, the Environmental Protection Commission and the Architectural Review Board. The department helps other departments with particular projects, such as providing maps for the Assessor's Office and salt-route mapping for the Public Works Department. An enforcement officer and code compliance officer investigate complaints of land-use regulations such as sign violations, illegal commercial activity within residential zones and violations of specific requirements set out in commission approvals.
- Public Works Department — with 30 full-time employees, it constructs and maintains town roads, buildings, bridges, storm and sanitary sewers, the Refuse Disposal Area (RDA, or "town dump"), two railroad stations, and municipal parking lots. The department has six major areas of responsibility:
  - Public Works Management & Engineering — manages all Public Works Department functions, prepares contracts, hires consultants and contractors, prepares engineering documents, performs engineering reviews, carries out special projects
  - Highway Maintenance & maintains 81 miles (130 km) of public streets and 30 bridges in town, picks up Christmas trees, sweeps streets, picks up items residents leave by the street during the town's spring cleanup program, conducts the town's Household Hazardous Waste Day on the first Saturday in June, resurfaces about three miles (5 km) of roadway each summer, picks up leaves left near the roadside by residents starting in late October, maintains and upgrades street signs, maintains the tide gates at Gorham's Pond, removes and cares for trees on town property.
  - Solid Waste Disposal and Recycling — this accounts for about 40 percent of the department budget. A private company working under contract operates the transfer station at the Refuse Disposal Area. The department operates other parts of the area, including the composting site, the residential recycling drop-off center and the bulk recycling transfer area. Refuse is trucked to the waste-to-energy incinerator in Bridgeport. Recycled material is hauled to the Intermediate Processing Center in Stratford for more sorting, packaging and sale.
  - Public Building Management — cares for various town-owned buildings.
  - Parking Facilities and Railroad & Maintenance — maintains and polices about 1,700 parking spaces in 13 lots in the downtown area and at the two railroad stations. A parking enforcement agent covers the downtown areas on foot and issues tickets.
  - Sewer Collection System Maintenance
- Registrars of Voters
- Social Services — helps the poor, the elderly and others with special needs.
- Tax Collector's Office
- Youth Director and Youth Commission

== Politics ==
As of December 1, 2005, the town had 12,099 registered voters, with 6,445 Republicans (53.1 percent), 1,940 Democrats (16 percent) and 3,703 unaffiliated voters (30.6 percent).

Darien is primarily a Republican town. The town has had Democrats in office as First Selectman. In 2003, Evonne Klein replaced Robert Harrel as first selectman, becoming the first Democrat to win the post in 14 years. Klein was re-elected in 2005.

The low percentage of registered Democrats does not mean that party has little representation in town government. The state's Minority Representation Law mandates that local elected boards have a maximum number of members from one party.

For a board with a total membership of three, no more than two may be from the same party. For boards with five members, no more than three; for boards of seven members, no more than five; for boards of nine members, no more than six.

=== Presidential elections ===
Historically, Darien has been a solidly Republican town; but in 2016, in spite of the Republican climate nationwide, Hillary Rodham Clinton became the first Democrat to win in Darien since 1888 when Grover Cleveland beat Benjamin Harrison by two votes. The pattern resembled one in suburban areas across the country that swung hard into the Democratic column due to the Republican Party being increasingly dominated by Donald Trump and right-wing populism which alienated the more moderate base, a trend referred to as the suburban revolt. In 2020, this trend continued, with Democrat and former Vice President Joe Biden winning over 60% of the vote and U.S. Representative Jim Himes winning it for the first time in his political career.

Darien was one of only five towns in Connecticut that backed former Ohio Governor John Kasich over Donald Trump in the 2016 Republican presidential primary (The others were neighboring New Canaan, as well as Salisbury, West Hartford, and Westport.). Kasich received 1,284 votes (48.89%), ahead of Trump who garnered 1,070 votes (41.54 percent) and U.S. Senator Ted Cruz of Texas with 186 votes (7.22 percent). In the Democratic primary, Hillary Clinton won 832 votes (69.51%) in Darien, far ahead of self-described democratic socialist U.S. Senator Bernie Sanders of Vermont with 363 votes (30.33%), reflecting the town’s moderate political identity.

Registration and Party Enrollment Statistics as of October 31, 2023
Party	Active voters	Inactive voters	Total voters	Percentage
Republican	5,034	196	5,230	33.82%
Democratic	3,804	154	3,958	25.60%
Unaffiliated	5,830	247	6,077	39.30%
Minor parties	182	16	198	1.28%
Total	14,850	613	15,463	100%

Darien town vote by party in presidential elections
Year	Democratic	Republican	Third Parties
2024	58.62% 6,988	39.69% 4,732	1.69% 201
2020	60.50% 7,876	37.80% 4,921	1.70% 221
2016	52.74% 5,942	41.06% 4,625	6.20% 698
2012	34.42% 3,777	65.39% 7,175	0.19% 21
2008	45.10% 4,943	54.28% 5,949	0.62% 68
2004	36.69% 4,057	62.30% 6,888	1.01% 112
2000	34.22% 3,496	63.09% 6,446	2.69% 275
1996	31.12% 2,988	63.10% 6,058	5.78% 555
1992	28.11% 3,089	58.22% 6,396	13.67% 1,502
1988	25.76% 2,696	73.34% 7,676	0.90% 94
1984	21.58% 2,341	78.01% 8,463	0.41% 45
1980	18.58% 1,990	67.62% 7,245	13.80% 1,479
1976	25.75% 2,784	73.92% 7,992	0.33% 36
1972	24.29% 2,662	75.06% 8,228	0.65% 71
1968	26.90% 2,713	70.96% 7,157	2.14% 216
1964	44.95% 4,264	55.05% 5,222	0.00% 0
1960	21.37% 2,055	78.63% 7,561	0.00% 0
1956	13.43% 1,214	86.57% 7,825	0.00% 0
1952	17.40% 1,332	82.50% 6,318	0.10% 8
1948	16.62% 883	81.34% 4,319	2.04% 108
1944	23.64% 1,134	76.36% 3,663	0.00% 0
1940	20.96% 898	79.04% 3,387	0.00% 0
1936	29.18% 980	70.82% 2,378	0.00% 0
1932	27.51% 731	72.49% 1,926	0.00% 0
1928	26.12% 598	73.44% 1,681	0.44% 10
1924	15.21% 218	79.13% 1,134	5.66% 81
1920	17.60% 192	80.47% 878	1.93% 21
1916	35.11% 250	63.63% 453	1.26% 9
1912	33.98% 210	34.15% 211	31.87% 197
1908	21.80% 131	76.70% 461	1.50% 9
1904	31.39% 172	68.61% 376	0.00% 0
1900	31.56% 154	68.44% 334	00.0% 0
1896	25.71% 126	65.51% 321	8.78% 43
1892	46.52% 221	51.58% 245	1.90% 9
1888	50.00% 245	49.60% 243	0.40% 2
1884	47.61% 199	52.39% 219	0.00% 0
1880	43.28% 187	56.72% 245	0.00% 0
1876	43.14% 170	56.86% 224	0.00% 0
1872	41.40% 118	58.60% 167	0.00% 0
1868	39.03% 121	60.97% 189	0.00% 0
1864	45.13% 125	54.87% 152	0.00% 0
1860	30.81% 126	38.38% 157	30.81% 126
1856	48.15% 104	51.85% 112	0.00% 0
1852	31.25% 55	68.75% 121	0.00% 0
1848	20.00% 43	58.60% 126	21.40% 46
1844	39.73% 89	60.27% 135	0.00% 0
1840	35.20% 63	64.80% 116	0.00% 0
1836	46.38% 32	53.62% 37	0.00% 0
1832	33.80% 24	66.10% 47	0.00% 0
1828	20.51% 8	79.49% 31	0.00% 0
