= 1984 United States presidential election in Connecticut =

- November 6, 1984
- Turnout: 82.4%

Nominee	Ronald Reagan	Walter Mondale
Party	Republican	Democratic
Home state	California	Minnesota
Running mate	George H. W. Bush	Geraldine Ferraro
Electoral vote	8	0
Popular vote	890,877	569,597
Percentage	60.73%	38.83%

Reagan
50–60%
60–70%
70–80%
Mondale
40–50%
50–60%
60–70%
70–80%
President before election
Ronald Reagan
Republican
Elected President
Ronald Reagan
Republican

The 1984 United States presidential election in Connecticut took place on November 6, 1984. All 50 states, as well as the District of Columbia, were part of the 1984 United States presidential election. Voters chose eight electors to the Electoral College, which selected the president and vice president of the United States. Connecticut was won by incumbent United States President Ronald Reagan of California, who was running against former Vice President Walter Mondale of Minnesota. Reagan ran for a second time with former C.I.A. Director George H. W. Bush of Texas, and Mondale ran with Representative Geraldine Ferraro of New York, the first major female candidate for the vice presidency.

Connecticut weighed in for this election as 2% more Republican than the national average. As of the 2024 United States presidential election, this is the last election in which Hartford County voted for the Republican candidate. This is also the final time that a Republican presidential candidate was able to win every county in the state or win by a double-digit margin. Reagan won Connecticut by a 22% margin and with slightly over 60% of the vote, making it 3.7% more Republican than the nation overall amid his national landslide. Since 1896, Connecticut had generally leaned Republican, voting for losing Republican candidates in 1916, 1932, 1948, and 1976 (but also voting for Hubert Humphrey in 1968 and for John F. Kennedy, as he only narrowly won in 1960). The basis for Republican strength in Connecticut had been suburban Fairfield County, where Reagan approached 2/3 of the vote. However, Reagan also took New Haven County—the swing county amongst the state's three largest—by twenty points, and won Hartford County—generally the most Democratic-friendly of the state's three largest counties—by double digits.

After 1996, all of Connecticut's large counties would become reliably Democratic, and the state with them. Reagan's 890,877 votes were the most received by a Republican presidential candidate in the state's history.

To date, this is the last time that the cities of Meriden, Norwich, and West Haven, as well as the towns of Ashford, Cornwall, East Hartford, Hamden, Manchester, Newington, Portland, Rocky Hill, West Hartford, Windham, and Windsor voted Republican.

== Results ==
1984 United States presidential election in Connecticut
Party	Candidate	Votes	Percentage	Electoral votes
Republican	Ronald Reagan (incumbent)	890,877	60.77%	8
Democratic	Walter Mondale	569,597	38.83%	0
Communist Party	Gus Hall	4,826	0.33%	0
New Alliance Party	Dennis Serrette	1,374	0.09%	0
Write-Ins		226	0.02%	0
Totals		1,466,900	100.0%	8

=== By county ===
County	Ronald Reagan Republican		Walter Mondale Democratic		Various candidates Other parties		Margin		Total votes cast
County	#	%	#	%	#	%	#	%	Total votes cast
Fairfield	257,319	65.78%	132,253	33.81%	1,607	0.41%	125,066	31.97%	391,179
Hartford	208,210	55.02%	168,609	44.56%	1,586	0.42%	39,601	10.46%	378,405
Litchfield	52,583	66.21%	26,564	33.45%	269	0.34%	26,019	32.76%	79,416
Middlesex	39,580	59.32%	26,915	40.34%	227	0.34%	12,665	18.98%	66,722
New Haven	212,166	59.81%	140,945	39.74%	1,601	0.45%	71,221	20.07%	354,712
New London	63,121	61.59%	38,857	37.91%	509	0.50%	24,264	23.68%	102,487
Tolland	32,981	61.88%	20,103	37.72%	214	0.40%	12,878	24.16%	53,298
Windham	24,917	61.59%	15,351	37.95%	187	0.46%	9,566	23.64%	40,455
Totals	890,877	60.73%	569,597	38.83%	6,426	0.44%	321,280	21.90%	1,466,900

==== Counties flipped from Democratic to Republican ====
- Hartford

=== By congressional district ===
Reagan won all 6 congressional districts, including four held by Democrats.

District	Ronald Reagan Republican		Walter Mondale Democratic		Others		Total votes cast	Representative
District	#	%	#	%	#	%	Total votes cast	Representative
1st	129,384	52.68%	115,174	46.89%	1,060	0.43%	245,618	Barbara B. Kennelly
2nd	141,593	60.62%	90,869	38.91%	1,105	0.47%	233,567	Sam Gejdenson
3rd	146,171	58.67%	101,877	40.90%	1,078	0.43%	249,126	Bruce Morrison
4th	154,515	63.20%	88,941	36.38%	1,036	0.42%	244,492	Stewart McKinney
5th	163,371	66.59%	80,816	32.95%	1,146	0.46%	245,333	William R. Ratchford
6th	155,843	62.65%	91,920	36.95%	1,001	0.40%	248,764	Nancy Johnson
Totals	890,877	60.73%	569,597	38.83%	6,426	0.44%	1,466,900	

== See also ==
- United States presidential elections in Connecticut
- Presidency of Ronald Reagan
