= Hartford County, Connecticut =

County in Connecticut, United States

- County
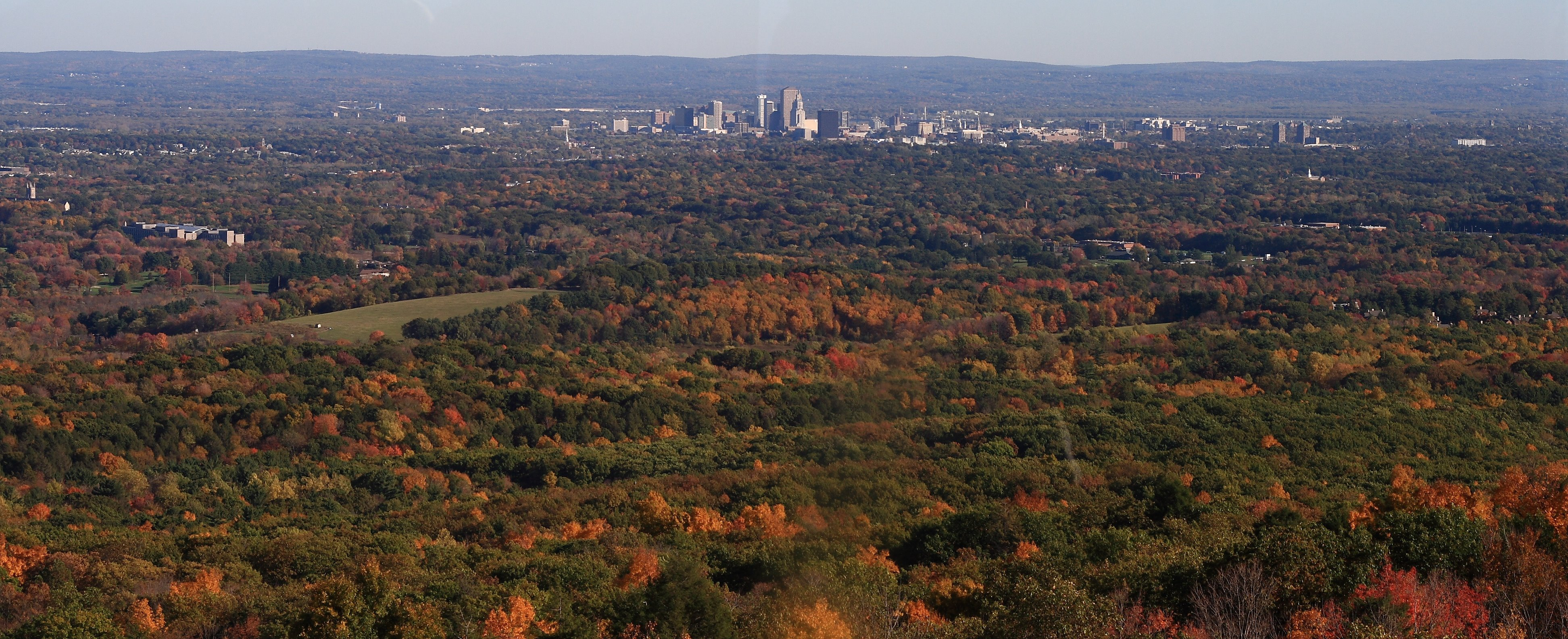
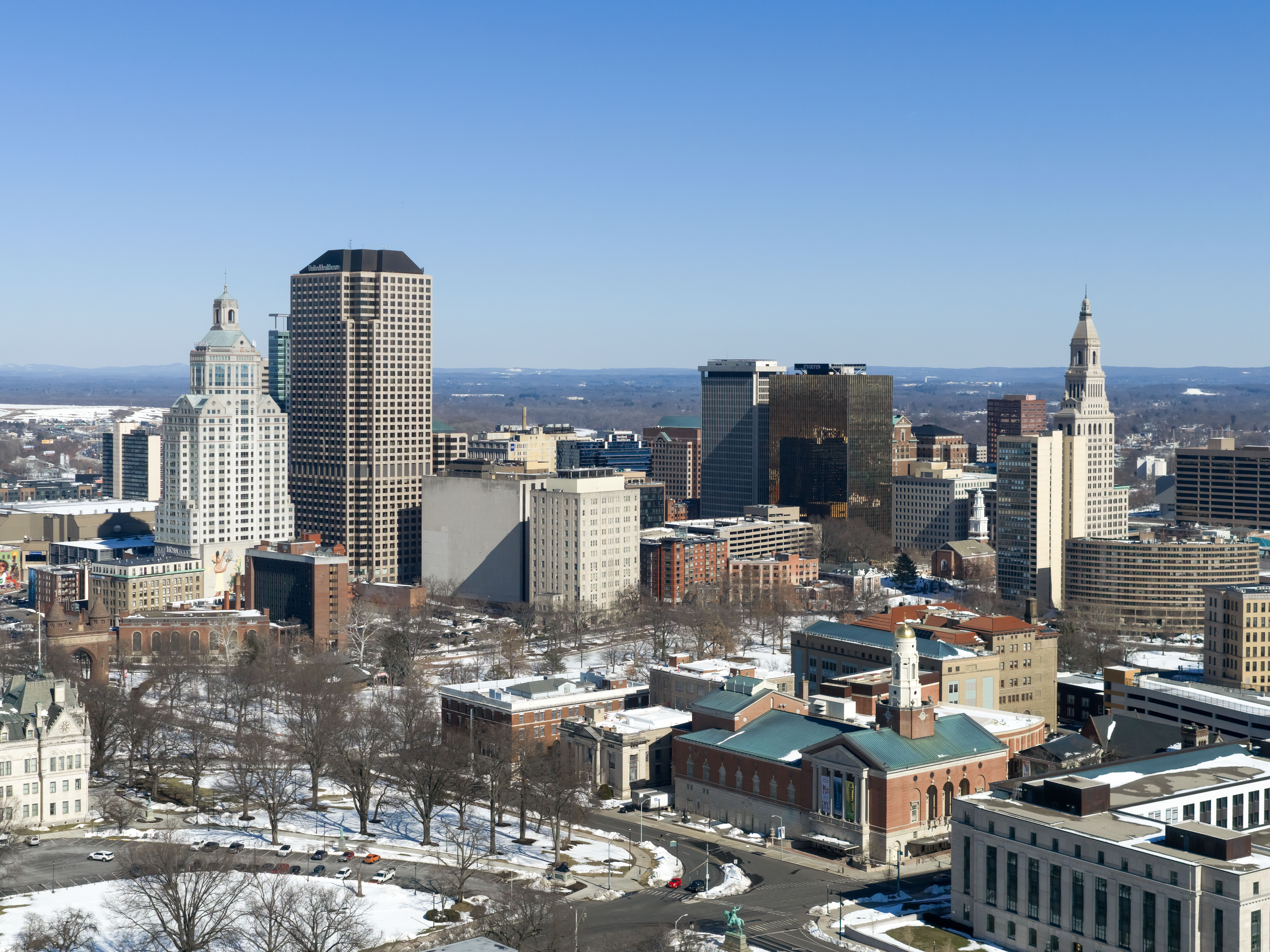
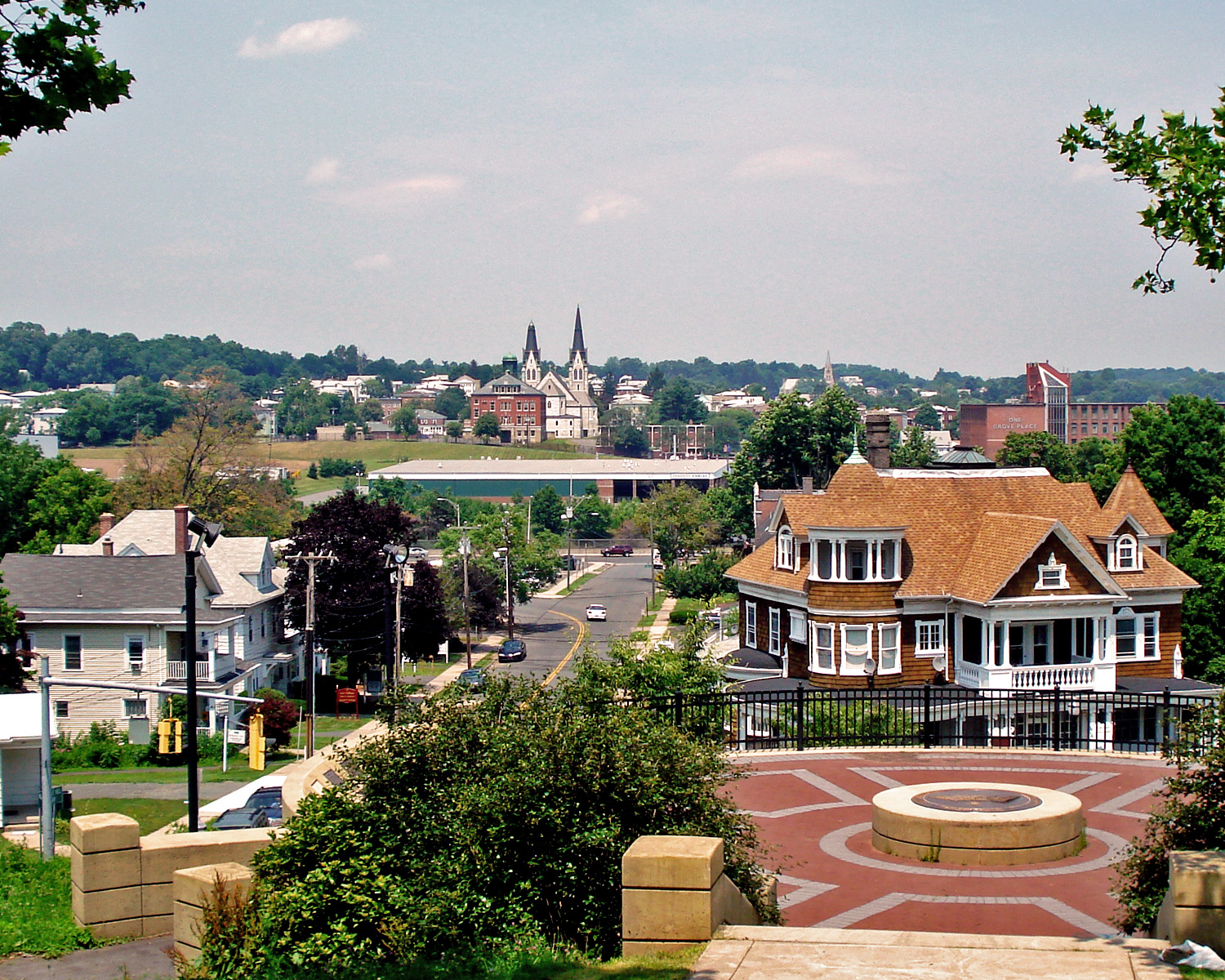
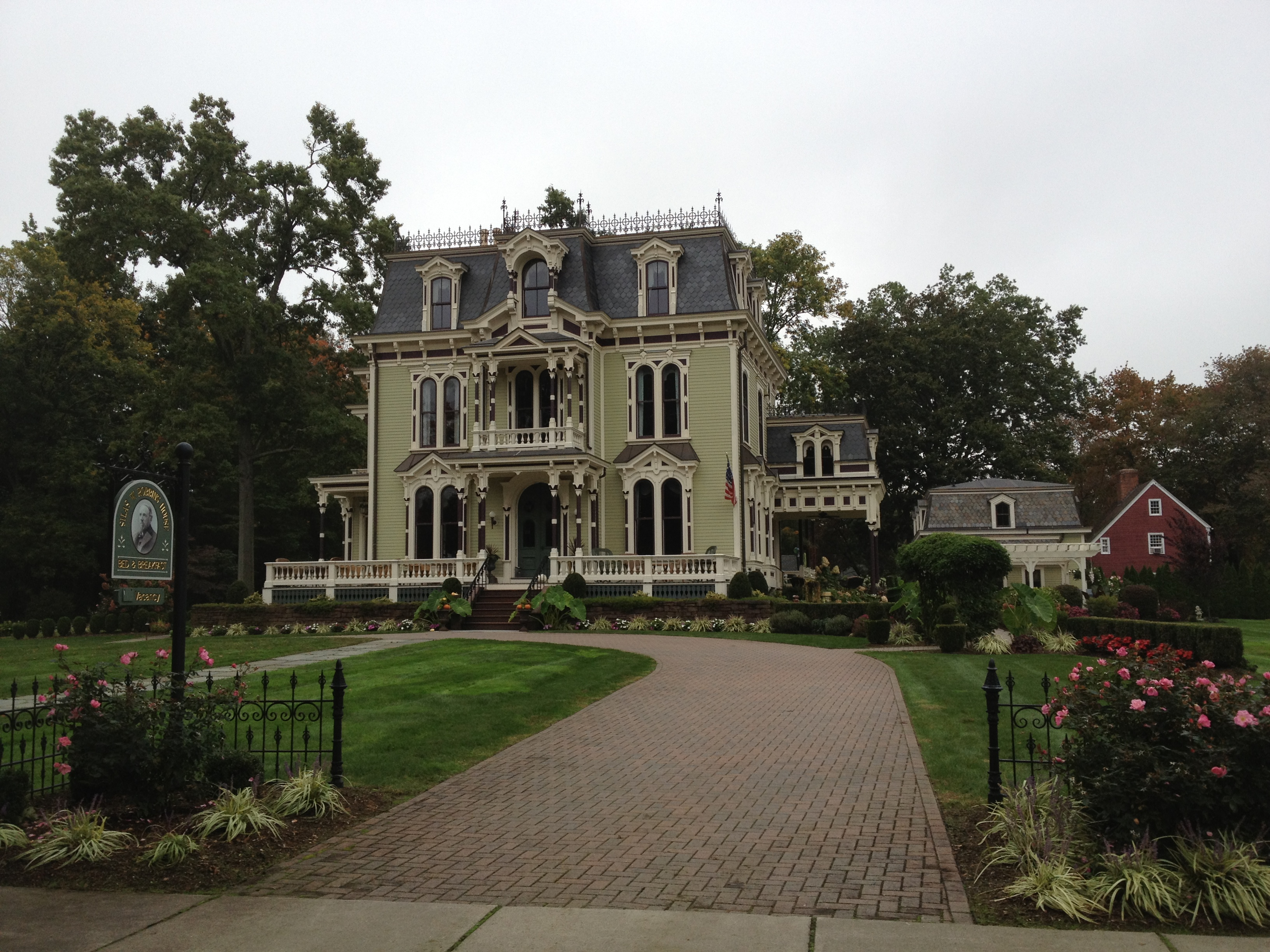
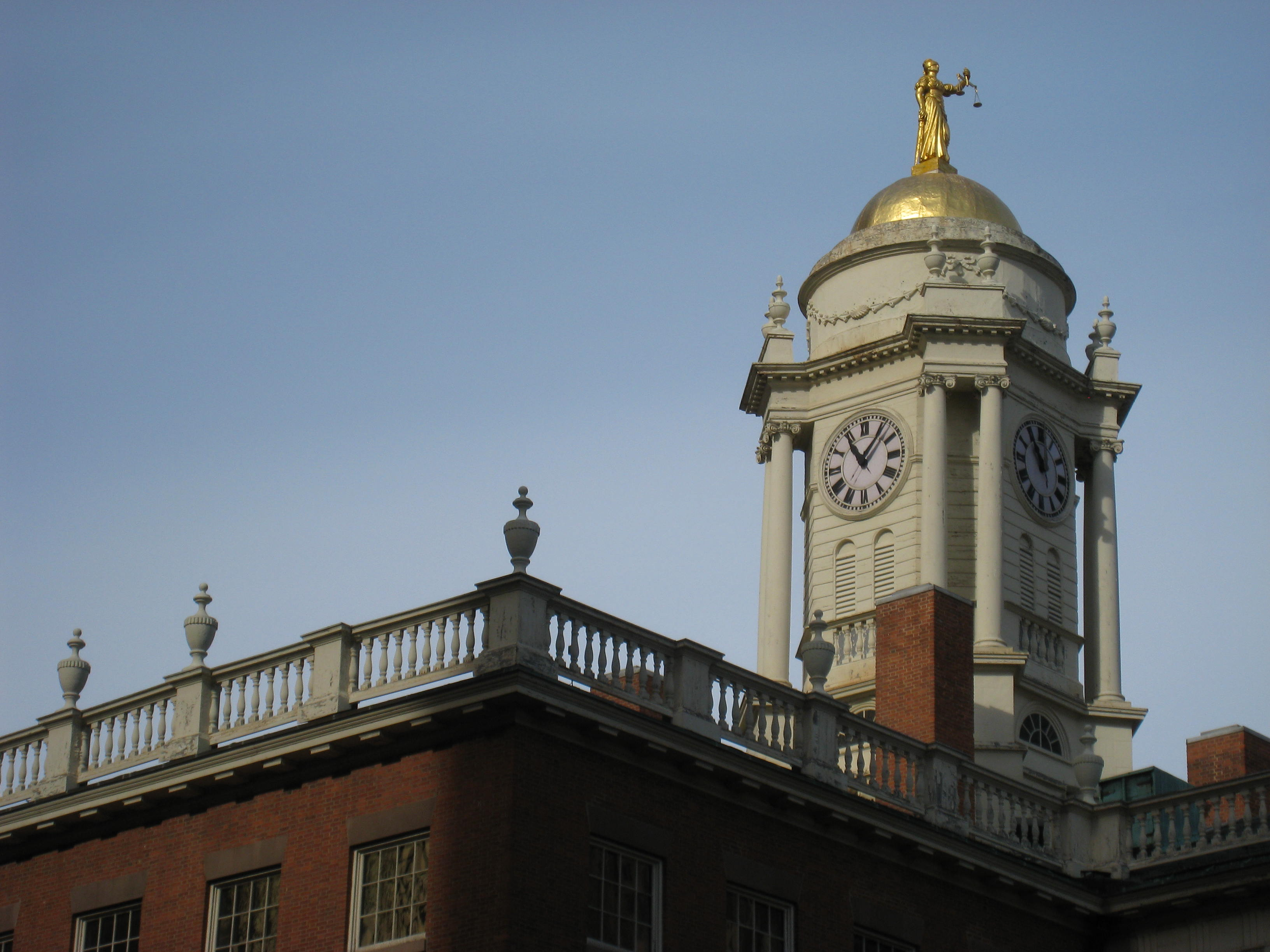
- Top-bottom, left-right: Hartford County skyline from Heublein Tower, the Hartford skyline, the New Britain skyline, a house in Old Wethersfield, and the Old State House in Hartford.

- Location within the U.S. state of Connecticut
- Interactive map of Hartford County, Connecticut
- Coordinates: 41°49′N 72°44′W
- Country: United States
- State: Connecticut
- Founded: May 10, 1666
- Named for: Hertfordshire, England
- Seat: none (since 1960), Hartford (before 1960)
- Largest municipality: Hartford (population); Glastonbury (area)

Area
  - Total: 750 sq mi (1,900 km^{2})
  - Land: 735 sq mi (1,900 km^{2})
  - Water: 16 sq mi (41 km^{2}) 2.1%

Population (2020)
  - Total: 899,498 ▲
  - Density: 1,199.3/sq mi (463.1/km^{2})
- Time zone: UTC−5 (Eastern)
  - Summer (DST): UTC−4 (EDT)
- Congressional districts: 1st, 2nd, 5th

Hartford County is a county located in the north central part of the U.S. state of Connecticut. According to the 2020 census, the population was 899,498, making it the second-most populous county in Connecticut. Hartford County contains the city of Hartford, the state capital of Connecticut and the county's most populous city, with 121,054 residents at the 2020 census. Hartford County is included in the Hartford-East Hartford-Middletown metropolitan statistical area.

On June 6, 2022, the U.S. Census Bureau formally recognized Connecticut's nine councils of governments as county equivalents instead of the state's eight counties. Connecticut's county governments were disbanded in 1960, and the councils of governments took over some of the local governmental functions. Connecticut's eight historical counties continue to exist in name only, and are no longer considered for statistical purposes.

== History ==
Hartford County was one of four original counties in Connecticut established on May 10, 1666, by an act of the Connecticut General Court. The act establishing the county states:

This Court orders that the Townes on the River from y^{ee}
north bounds of Windsor w^{th} Farmington to y^{e} south end of
y^{e} bounds of Thirty Miles Island shalbe & remaine to be one
County w^{ch} shalbe called the County of Hartford. And it
is ordered that the County Court shalbe kept at Hartford on
the 1st Thursday in March and on the first Thursday in September yearely.

As established in 1666, Hartford County consisted of the towns of Windsor, Wethersfield, Hartford, Farmington, and Middletown. The "Thirty Miles Island" referred to in the constituting Act was incorporated as the town of Haddam in 1668. In 1670, the town of Simsbury was established, extending Hartford County to the Massachusetts border. In the late 17th to early 18th centuries, several more towns were established and added to Hartford County: Waterbury in 1686 (transferred to New Haven County in 1728), Windham in 1694 (transferred to Windham County in 1726), Hebron in 1708 (transferred to Tolland County in 1785), Coventry in 1712 (transferred to Windham County in 1726), and Litchfield in 1722 (transferred to Litchfield County in 1751).

In 1714, all of the unincorporated territory north of the towns of Coventry and Windham in northeastern Connecticut to the Massachusetts border were placed under the jurisdiction of Hartford County. Windham County was constituted in 1726, resulting in Hartford County losing the towns of Windham, Coventry, Mansfield (incorporated in 1702), and Ashford (incorporated in 1714). Northwestern Connecticut, which was originally placed under the jurisdiction of New Haven County in 1722, was transferred to Hartford County by 1738. All of northwestern Connecticut was later constituted as the new Litchfield County in 1751. In 1785, two more counties were established in what was now the U.S. state of Connecticut: Tolland and Middlesex. This mostly resulted in the modern extent of Hartford County. In the late 18th and early 19th centuries, the establishment of several more towns resulted in minor adjustments in the bounds of the county. The final adjustment resulting in the modern limits occurred on May 8, 1806, when the town of Canton was established.

== Geography ==
According to the U.S. Census Bureau in 2010, the county had a total area of 751 square miles (1,950 km^{2}), of which 735 square miles (1,900 km^{2}) is land and 16 square miles (41 km^{2}) (2.1%) is water. It is the second-largest county in Connecticut by land area.

The county is divided into two unequal parts by the Connecticut River, and watered by Farmington, Mill, Podunk, Scantic, and other rivers. The surface is very diverse: part of the river valleys are alluvial and subject to flooding, while other portions of the county are hilly and even mountainous.

=== Adjacent counties ===
- Hampden County, Massachusetts (north)
- Tolland County (east)
- New London County (southeast)
- Middlesex County (south)
- New Haven County (southwest)
- Litchfield County (west)

== Communities ==
In Connecticut, there is no county-level executive or legislative government; the counties determine probate, civil and criminal court boundaries, but little else. Each city or town is responsible for local services such as schools, snow removal, sewers, fire department and police departments. In Connecticut, cities and towns may agree to jointly provide services or establish a regional school system.

=== Cities ===
- Bristol
- Hartford
- New Britain

=== Towns and CDPs ===
- Avon
- Berlin
  - Kensington
- Bloomfield
  - Blue Hills (part)
- Burlington
- Canton
  - Canton Valley
  - Collinsville
- East Granby
- East Hartford
- East Windsor
  - Broad Brook
- Enfield
  - Hazardville
  - Sherwood Manor
  - Southwood Acres
  - Thompsonville
- Farmington
- Glastonbury
  - Glastonbury Center
- Granby
  - North Granby
  - Salmon Brook
- Hartland
- Manchester
  - Manchester (CDP)
- Marlborough
  - Terramuggus
- Newington
- Plainville
- Rocky Hill
- Simsbury
  - Simsbury Center
  - Tariffville
  - Weatogue
  - West Simsbury
- South Windsor
- Southington
  - Plantsville
- Suffield
  - Suffield Depot
- West Hartford
- Wethersfield
- Windsor
- Windsor Locks

== Demographics ==
Historical population
Census	Pop.	Note	%±
1790	38,149		—
1800	42,147		10.5%
1810	44,733		6.1%
1820	47,264		5.7%
1830	51,131		8.2%
1840	55,629		8.8%
1850	69,967		25.8%
1860	89,962		28.6%
1870	109,007		21.2%
1880	125,382		15.0%
1890	147,180		17.4%
1900	195,480		32.8%
1910	250,182		28.0%
1920	336,027		34.3%
1930	421,097		25.3%
1940	450,189		6.9%
1950	539,661		19.9%
1960	689,555		27.8%
1970	816,737		18.4%
1980	807,766		−1.1%
1990	851,783		5.4%
2000	857,183		0.6%
2010	894,014		4.3%
2020	899,498		0.6%
U.S. Decennial Census; 1790–1960 1900–1990; 1990–2000 2010–2018

=== 2020 census ===
As of the 2020 census, the county had a population of 899,498. Of the residents, 20.7% were under the age of 18 and 18.0% were 65 years of age or older; the median age was 40.7 years. For every 100 females there were 93.4 males, and for every 100 females age 18 and over there were 90.9 males. 94.2% of residents lived in urban areas and 5.8% lived in rural areas.

The racial makeup of the county was 61.6% White, 14.1% Black or African American, 0.3% American Indian and Alaska Native, 6.0% Asian, 0.0% Native Hawaiian and Pacific Islander, 8.9% from some other race, and 8.9% from two or more races. Hispanic or Latino residents of any race comprised 18.5% of the population.

There were 362,021 households in the county, of which 28.8% had children under the age of 18 living with them and 31.2% had a female householder with no spouse or partner present. About 30.1% of all households were made up of individuals and 13.0% had someone living alone who was 65 years of age or older.

There were 385,307 housing units, of which 6.0% were vacant. Among occupied housing units, 62.5% were owner-occupied and 37.5% were renter-occupied. The homeowner vacancy rate was 1.3% and the rental vacancy rate was 6.8%.

=== Racial and ethnic composition ===
Hartford County, Connecticut – Racial and ethnic composition Note: the US Census treats Hispanic/Latino as an ethnic category. This table excludes Latinos from the racial categories and assigns them to a separate category. Hispanics/Latinos may be of any race.
Race / Ethnicity (NH = Non-Hispanic)	Pop 1980	Pop 1990	Pop 2000	Pop 2010	Pop 2020	% 1980	% 1990	% 2000	% 2010	% 2020
White alone (NH)	692,083	683,004	625,797	591,283	523,105	85.68%	80.19%	73.01%	66.14%	58.16%
Black or African American alone (NH)	65,144	81,884	95,157	110,005	118,154	8.06%	9.61%	11.10%	12.30%	13.14%
Native American or Alaska Native alone (NH)	921	1,225	1,253	1,272	1,166	0.11%	0.14%	0.15%	0.14%	0.13%
Asian alone (NH)	4,676	12,915	20,535	37,581	53,325	0.58%	1.52%	2.40%	4.20%	5.93%
Native Hawaiian or Pacific Islander alone (NH)	x	x	224	186	172	x	x	0.03%	0.02%	0.02%
Other race alone (NH)	3,536	1,180	1,717	2,288	5,659	0.44%	0.14%	0.20%	0.26%	0.63%
Mixed race or Multiracial (NH)	x	x	13,532	14,616	31,642	x	x	1.58%	1.63%	3.52%
Hispanic or Latino (any race)	41,406	71,575	98,968	136,783	166,275	5.13%	8.40%	11.55%	15.30%	18.49%
Total	807,766	851,783	857,183	894,014	899,498	100.00%	100.00%	100.00%	100.00%	100.00%

=== 2010 census ===
As of the 2010 United States census, there were 894,014 people, 350,854 households, and 227,831 families living in the county. The population density was 1,216.2 inhabitants per square mile (469.6/km^{2}). There were 374,249 housing units at an average density of 509.1 per square mile (196.6/km^{2}). The racial makeup of the county was 72.4% white, 13.3% black, 4.2% Asian, 0.3% American Indian, 7.1% from other races, and 2.7% from two or more races. Those of Hispanic origin made up 15.3% of the population. In terms of ancestry, 15.9% were Italian, 15.6% were Irish, 10.7% were Polish, 9.4% were English, 8.8% were German, and 2.5% were American.

Of the 350,854 households, 31.9% had children under the age of 18 living with them, 46.0% were married couples living together, 14.5% had a female householder with no husband present, 35.1% were non-families, and 28.7% of all households were made up of individuals. The average household size was 2.47 and the average family size was 3.06. The median age was 39.9 years.

The median income for a household in the county was $62,590 and the median income for a family was $78,599. Males had a median income of $56,181 versus $44,273 for females. The per capita income for the county was $33,151. About 8.0% of families and 10.7% of the population were below the poverty line, including 15.3% of those under age 18 and 7.7% of those age 65 or over.

=== 2000 census ===
As of the census of 2000, there were 857,183 people, 335,098 households, and 222,505 families living in the county. The population density was 1,166 inhabitants per square mile (450/km^{2}). There were 353,022 housing units at an average density of 480 per square mile (190/km^{2}). The racial makeup of the county was 76.90% White, 11.66% Black or African American, 0.23% Native American, 2.42% Asian, 0.04% Pacific Islander, 6.43% from other races, and 2.31% from two or more races. 11.55% of the population were Hispanic or Latino of any race. 15.2% were of Italian, 11.2% Irish, 9.1% Polish, 6.5% English, 5.7% French and 5.3% German ancestry. 78.4% spoke English, 10.3% Spanish, 2.6% Polish, 1.9% French and 1.6% Italian as their first language.

There were 335,098 households, out of which 31.30% had children under the age of 18 living with them, 49.20% were married couples living together, 13.50% had a female householder with no husband present, and 33.60% were non-families. 27.90% of all households were made up of individuals, and 10.70% had someone living alone who was 65 years of age or older. The average household size was 2.48 and the average family size was 3.05.

In the county, the population was spread out, with 24.60% under the age of 18, 7.80% from 18 to 24, 29.80% from 25 to 44, 23.20% from 45 to 64, and 14.70% who were 65 years of age or older. The median age was 38 years. For every 100 females, there were 92.70 males. For every 100 females age 18 and over, there were 89.00 males.

The median income for a household in the county was $50,756, and the median income for a family was $62,144. Males had a median income of $43,985 versus $33,042 for females. The per capita income for the county was $26,047. About 7.10% of families and 9.30% of the population were below the poverty line, including 12.90% of those under age 18 and 7.60% of those age 65 or over.

=== Demographic breakdown by town ===
==== Income ====
Data is from the 2010 United States Census and the 2006–2010 American Community Survey 5-Year Estimates.

Rank	Town		Per capita income	Median household income	Median family income	Population	Number of households	Pop. Density
1	Glastonbury	Town	$73,020	$127,237	$145,321	34,427	12,866	670
2	Avon	Town	$55,879	$105,116	$129,651	18,098	7,009	770
3	Simsbury	Town	$54,571	$113,224	$135,772	23,511	8,776	685
4	Farmington	Town	$50,541	$85,417	$106,885	25,340	10,522	881
5	Granby	Town	$46,687	$97,500	$111,339	11,282	4,194	277
6	Canton	Town	$46,401	$87,643	$101,793	10,292	4,150	412
7	West Hartford	Town	$43,534	$78,530	$102,547	63,268	25,258	2,837
8	Burlington	Town	$43,392	$115,341	$120,580	9,301	3,291	306
9	Marlborough	Town	$41,669	$108,232	$110,527	6,404	2,292	272
10	Suffield	Town	$41,098	$90,023	$99,855	15,735	5,155	366
11	East Granby	Town	$40,698	$77,596	$97,174	5,148	2,062	291
12	Bloomfield	Town	$39,738	$68,372	$84,583	20,486	8,554	779
13	South Windsor	Town	$38,945	$88,350	$94,602	25,709	9,918	896
14	Berlin	Town	$38,134	$86,211	$98,677	19,866	7,808	736
15	Wethersfield	Town	$37,329	$71,284	$91,563	26,668	11,204	2,036
16	Hartland	Town	$36,874	$85,956	$91,188	2,114	789	61
17	Southington	Town	$36,053	$77,673	$102,186	43,069	16,814	1,177
18	Rocky Hill	Town	$36,021	$72,417	$88,750	19,709	8,307	1,426
19	Windsor	Town	$35,780	$78,695	$90,856	29,044	11,233	937
20	Manchester	Town	$32,752	$61,571	$77,018	58,241	24,689	2,103
21	Newington	Town	$32,561	$69,085	$80,597	30,562	12,550	2,333
22	East Windsor	Town	$31,162	$64,301	$76,502	11,162	4,750	416
23	Plainville	Town	$31,000	$63,447	$80,205	17,716	7,580	1,814
24	Windsor Locks	Town	$30,436	$59,369	$70,439	12,498	5,223	1,330
25	Bristol	City	$29,629	$58,537	$72,038	60,477	25,320	2,257
26	Enfield	Town	$29,340	$67,402	$77,554	44,654	16,794	1,306
27	East Hartford	Town	$24,373	$48,613	$57,848	51,252	20,195	2,741
28	New Britain	City	$21,056	$39,706	$45,990	73,206	28,158	5,463
29	Hartford	City	$16,798	$28,970	$32,820	124,775	45,124	6,932

==== Race ====
Data is from the 2007-2011 American Community Survey 5-Year Estimates, ACS Demographic and Housing Estimates, "Race alone or in combination with one or more other races."

Rank	Town		Population	White	Black	Asian	American Indian	Other	Hispanic
1	Hartford	City	124,817	35.1%	39.8%	2.9%	1.5%	25.1%	42.4%
2	New Britain	City	73,055	68.2%	15.3%	2.7%	0.5%	17.2%	34.8%
3	West Hartford	Town	63,066	84.6%	7.4%	8.2%	0.7%	2.3%	9.1%
4	Bristol	City	60,473	90.0%	5.1%	2.3%	0.8%	4.9%	9.5%
5	Manchester	Town	57,897	77.0%	11.7%	7.8%	0.6%	5.6%	12.5%
6	East Hartford	Town	51,091	54.4%	25.4%	7.3%	0.9%	15.5%	25.7%
7	Enfield	Town	44,747	88.5%	7.4%	2.1%	0.4%	3.5%	7.2%
8	Southington	Town	42,731	96.3%	1.2%	1.8%	0.2%	1.0%	3.4%
9	Glastonbury	Town	34,171	87.7%	4.1%	7.0%	0.4%	2.2%	4.6%
10	Newington	Town	30,441	86.9%	6.0%	6.3%	0.6%	2.5%	7.2%
11	Windsor	Town	28,962	56.4%	37.6%	5.0%	0.5%	3.7%	8.4%
12	Wethersfield	Town	26,641	92.4%	3.4%	1.8%	0.5%	3.3%	8.8%
13	South Windsor	Town	25,577	84.7%	5.2%	8.4%	0.4%	2.9%	5.3%
14	Farmington	Town	25,186	90.0%	3.0%	7.8%	0.4%	0.3%	1.3%
15	Simsbury	Town	23,498	94.3%	2.3%	4.0%	0.5%	0.4%	2.3%
16	Bloomfield	Town	20,406	40.1%	59.0%	1.7%	2.6%	1.4%	3.7%
17	Berlin	Town	19,694	94.3%	1.5%	2.7%	0.4%	1.9%	2.7%
18	Rocky Hill	Town	19,533	78.7%	4.9%	13.9%	1.6%	3.2%	6.5%
19	Avon	Town	17,859	90.5%	2.3%	8.0%	0.5%	1.0%	4.2%
20	Plainville	Town	17,670	95.7%	2.9%	2.3%	0.3%	1.0%	4.7%
21	Suffield	Town	15,513	86.3%	9.6%	1.5%	1.5%	4.0%	5.8%
22	Windsor Locks	Town	12,466	89.1%	4.2%	6.0%	1.1%	1.2%	3.6%
23	Granby	Town	11,192	96.1%	2.7%	1.2%	0.1%	1.3%	4.0%
24	East Windsor	Town	11,024	83.2%	10.2%	6.9%	0.6%	0.9%	5.5%
25	Canton	Town	10,139	99.0%	0.6%	1.1%	0.5%	0.4%	2.6%
26	Burlington	Town	9,191	97.8%	1.1%	1.5%	0.1%	0.3%	2.5%
27	Marlborough	Town	6,335	98.8%	1.0%	0.5%	0.7%	0.5%	1.6%
28	East Granby	Town	5,055	89.9%	2.4%	6.9%	0.2%	1.3%	4.3%
29	Hartland	Town	2,158	97.5%	0.9%	2.1%	0.4%	0.2%	0.3%

== Transportation ==
=== Major highways ===
- I-91
- I-84
- I-291
- I-384
- I-691
- US 5
- US 6
- US 44
- US 202
- Route 2
- Route 3
- Route 4
- Route 9
- Route 15
- Route 20
- Route 72
- Route 179
- Route 187
- Route 189
- Route 218

=== Public transportation ===
- Connecticut Transit Hartford

== Politics ==
Prior to 1960, Hartford County was a Republican-leaning swing county in presidential elections. Since then, it has become solidly Democratic similar to most of New England, with the only Republicans to carry the county since then being Richard Nixon and Ronald Reagan in their 49-state landslide victories of 1972 and 1984, respectively.

United States presidential election results for Hartford County, Connecticut
Year	Republican		Democratic		Third party(ies)	
Year	No.	%	No.	%	No.	%
1884	13,694	48.26%	13,964	49.21%	718	2.53%
1888	15,549	49.55%	14,984	47.75%	848	2.70%
1892	16,190	48.37%	16,125	48.18%	1,156	3.45%
1896	24,489	67.91%	9,726	26.97%	1,848	5.12%
1900	22,425	59.25%	14,490	38.29%	931	2.46%
1904	23,865	57.67%	16,004	38.67%	1,513	3.66%
1908	24,781	61.36%	12,967	32.11%	2,637	6.53%
1912	16,961	39.09%	16,756	38.62%	9,674	22.29%
1916	23,265	46.75%	24,398	49.03%	2,102	4.22%
1920	54,046	60.74%	30,287	34.04%	4,646	5.22%
1924	61,381	61.93%	28,139	28.39%	9,591	9.68%
1928	75,997	53.16%	65,789	46.02%	1,169	0.82%
1932	72,611	48.36%	72,322	48.17%	5,220	3.48%
1936	65,652	37.23%	103,450	58.67%	7,216	4.09%
1940	88,155	43.44%	114,336	56.34%	462	0.23%
1944	95,224	42.47%	127,841	57.02%	1,153	0.51%
1948	105,262	44.74%	124,874	53.07%	5,157	2.19%
1952	150,332	50.50%	146,551	49.23%	831	0.28%
1956	175,894	58.09%	126,923	41.91%	0	0.00%
1960	136,459	41.12%	195,403	58.88%	2	0.00%
1964	88,811	26.95%	240,071	72.86%	622	0.19%
1968	131,740	38.78%	190,865	56.19%	17,096	5.03%
1972	194,095	52.09%	174,837	46.93%	3,654	0.98%
1976	175,064	47.51%	191,257	51.90%	2,173	0.59%
1980	150,265	40.46%	164,643	44.33%	56,472	15.21%
1984	208,210	55.02%	168,609	44.56%	1,586	0.42%
1988	173,031	45.95%	199,857	53.08%	3,648	0.97%
1992	132,591	31.96%	195,495	47.13%	86,718	20.91%
1996	111,566	31.26%	203,549	57.04%	41,726	11.69%
2000	127,468	34.68%	221,167	60.17%	18,921	5.15%
2004	154,919	39.54%	229,902	58.68%	6,987	1.78%
2008	138,984	33.67%	268,721	65.11%	5,023	1.22%
2012	143,238	36.52%	244,639	62.37%	4,363	1.11%
2016	148,173	36.42%	240,403	59.09%	18,288	4.49%
2020	159,024	35.39%	283,368	63.06%	6,944	1.55%
2024	162,572	37.87%	259,366	60.41%	7,387	1.72%

United States Senate election results for Hartford County, Connecticut1
Year	Republican		Democratic		Third party(ies)	
Year	No.	%	No.	%	No.	%
2012	148,754	39.26%	224,187	59.17%	5,953	1.57%
2018	123,864	36.34%	213,157	62.53%	3,845	1.13%
2024	150,084	35.96%	259,568	62.19%	7,744	1.86%

United States Senate election results for Hartford County, Connecticut2
Year	Republican		Democratic		Third party(ies)	
Year	No.	%	No.	%	No.	%
2010	115,628	40.01%	168,891	58.44%	4,459	1.54%
2016	122,624	30.96%	265,018	66.91%	8,430	2.13%
2022	119,280	38.62%	189,512	61.36%	42	0.01%

Connecticut Gubernatorial election results for Hartford County
Year	Republican		Democratic		Third party(ies)	
Year	No.	%	No.	%	No.	%
2010	151,191	51.79%	136,501	46.76%	4,248	1.46%
2014	125,722	48.02%	133,159	50.86%	2,947	1.13%
2018	144,218	41.64%	179,182	51.74%	22,930	6.62%
2022	121,948	39.29%	185,124	59.64%	3,313	1.07%

== Education ==
School districts include:

K-12:

- Avon School District
- Berlin School District
- Bloomfield School District
- Bristol School District
- Canton School District
- East Granby School District
- East Hartford School District
- East Windsor School District
- Enfield Public Schools
- Farmington Public Schools
- Glastonbury School District
- Granby School District
- Hartford Public Schools
- Manchester School District
- Consolidated School District of New Britain
- Newington School District
- Plainville School District
- Regional School District 10
- Rocky Hill Public Schools
- Simsbury School District
- South Windsor Public Schools
- Southington School District
- Suffield Public Schools
- West Hartford Public Schools
- Wethersfield School District
- Windsor Public Schools
- Windsor Locks School District

Secondary districts:

- Regional High School District 08

Elementary districts:

- Hartland School District
- Marlborough School District

== See also ==
- National Register of Historic Places listings in Hartford County, Connecticut
