= New Haven County, Connecticut =

County in Connecticut, United States

- County
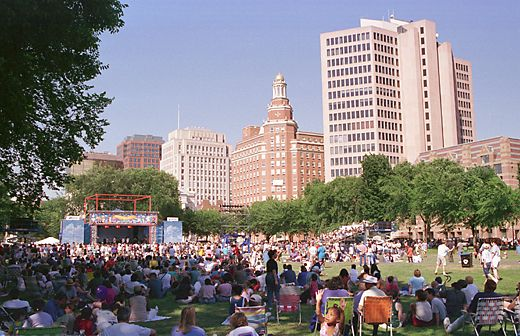
- The New Haven Green Historic District

- Location within the U.S. state of Connecticut
- Coordinates: 41°21′N 72°54′W
- Country: United States
- State: Connecticut
- Founded: 1666
- Named for: New Haven Colony
- Seat: none (since 1960); New Haven (before 1960)
- Largest municipality: New Haven (population); Guilford (area)

Area
  - Total: 862 sq mi (2,230 km^{2})
  - Land: 605 sq mi (1,570 km^{2})
  - Water: 258 sq mi (670 km^{2}) 29.9%

Population (2020)
  - Total: 864,835 ▲
  - Density: 1,429.5/sq mi (551.9/km^{2})
- Time zone: UTC−5 (Eastern)
  - Summer (DST): UTC−4 (EDT)
- Congressional districts: 2nd, 3rd, 4th, 5th

Interactive map of New Haven County, Connecticut

New Haven County is a county in the south central part of the U.S. state of Connecticut. As of the 2020 census, the population was 864,835, making it the third-most populous county in Connecticut. Two of the state's five largest cities, New Haven (3rd) and Waterbury (5th), are part of New Haven County.

New Haven County is divided between the New Haven, CT Metropolitan Statistical Area (MSA) and the Waterbury–Shelton, CT MSA, which are both included in the New Haven–Hartford–Waterbury, CT Combined Statistical Area (CSA).

County governments were abolished in Connecticut in 1960. Thus, as is the case with all eight of Connecticut's counties, there is no county government, and no county seat. Until 1960, the city of New Haven was the county seat. In Connecticut, towns are responsible for all local government activities, including fire and rescue, snow removal and schools. In some cases, neighboring towns will share certain activities, e.g. schools, health, etc. New Haven County is merely a group of towns on a map, and has no specific government authority. The county Sheriff system was abolished by voters and replaced by State Judicial Marshals in 2000. As a result, the state judicial system in New Haven County has three judicial districts: New Haven, Ansonia-Milford, and Waterbury. On June 6, 2022, the U.S. Census Bureau formally recognized Connecticut's nine councils of governments as county equivalents instead of the state's eight counties. Connecticut's eight historical counties continue to exist in name only, and are no longer considered for most federal statistical purposes going forward, even though statistical information for the county can still be created in many cases simply by grouping data from its component towns.

== History ==
Following the process of unification of New Haven Colony with Connecticut Colony in 1664–65, cohesion could be improved. New Haven County was constituted by an act of the Connecticut General Court on May 10, 1666, along with Hartford County, Fairfield County, and New London County. The act establishing the county states:

This Court orders that from the east bounds of Guilford
vnto y^{e} west bounds of Milford shalbe for future one County
w^{ch} shalbe called the County of N: Hauen. And it is
ordered that the County Court shalbe held at N: Hauen on
the second Wednesday in March and on the second Wednesday
in Nouember yearely.

As established in 1666, New Haven County consisted of the towns of Milford, New Haven, and Guilford. The town of Wallingford was established in 1670 in unincorporated area north of New Haven and formally added to New Haven County in 1671. In 1675, the town of Derby was established north of Milford. In 1686, the town of Waterbury was established, but was assigned as part of Hartford County. Waterbury was transferred to New Haven County in 1728. In 1722, most of northwestern Connecticut (except for the town of Litchfield) was placed under the jurisdiction of New Haven County. Eight years later, in 1730, the eastern half of northwestern Connecticut was transferred to the jurisdiction of Hartford County. By mid-1738, with the exception of the towns of New Milford, Sharon, and Salisbury, the entire territory of northwestern Connecticut was under Hartford County. In 1751, Litchfield County was constituted consisting of all the towns in northwestern Connecticut. Between 1780 and 1807, several more towns were established along the northern boundary of New Haven County, resulting in the alteration of the limits of the county. The final boundary alteration leading to the modern boundary resulted from the establishment of the town of Middlebury on October 8, 1807.

== Geography ==
According to the U.S. Census Bureau, the county has a total area of 862 square miles (2,230 km^{2}), of which 605 square miles (1,570 km^{2}) is land and 258 square miles (670 km^{2}) (29.9%) is water. It is the second-largest county in Connecticut by total area.

=== Features ===
The terrain is mostly flat near the coast, with low hills defining the rest of the area, rising significantly only in the north of the county. The highest elevation is close to the northernmost point in the county, found at two areas of approximately 1,050 feet (320 m) above sea level in the town of Wolcott. The lowest point is sea level.

Notable geographic landmarks include Mount Carmel ("Sleeping Giant"), West Rock and East Rock.

=== Adjacent counties ===
- Hartford County (north)
- Middlesex County (east)
- Fairfield County (west)
- Litchfield County (northwest)

New Haven county is bounded on the south by Long Island Sound.

=== National protected area ===
- Stewart B. McKinney National Wildlife Refuge (part)

== Government and municipal services ==
As of 1960, counties in Connecticut do not have any associated county government structure. All municipal services are provided by the towns. In order to address issues concerning more than one town, several regional agencies that help coordinate the towns for infrastructure, land use, and economic development concerns have been established. Within the geographical area of New Haven County, the regional agencies are:

- South Central Regional Council of Governments, serving the South Central Connecticut Planning Region
- Naugatuck Valley Council of Governments (partly in Litchfield County), serving the Naugatuck Valley Planning Region

The following table relates municipalities in New Haven County with their Planning Region.

Planning Regions in New Haven County
Municipality	Planning Region
Ansonia	Naugatuck Valley
Beacon Falls	Naugatuck Valley
Bethany	South Central Connecticut
Branford	South Central Connecticut
Cheshire	Naugatuck Valley
Derby	Naugatuck Valley
East Haven	South Central Connecticut
Guilford	South Central Connecticut
Hamden	South Central Connecticut
Madison	South Central Connecticut
Meriden	South Central Connecticut
Middlebury	Naugatuck Valley
Milford	South Central Connecticut
Naugatuck	Naugatuck Valley
New Haven	South Central Connecticut
North Branford	South Central Connecticut
North Haven	South Central Connecticut
Orange	South Central Connecticut
Oxford	Naugatuck Valley
Prospect	Naugatuck Valley
Seymour	Naugatuck Valley
Southbury	Naugatuck Valley
Wallingford	South Central Connecticut
Waterbury	Naugatuck Valley
West Haven	South Central Connecticut
Wolcott	Naugatuck Valley
Woodbridge	South Central Connecticut

=== Judicial ===
The geographic area of the county is served by the three separate judicial districts: Ansonia-Milford, Waterbury, and New Haven. The Ansonia-Milford jurisdiction has two superior courthouses, one in Derby, the other in Milford. The Waterbury and New Haven judicial districts have superior courthouses located, respectively, in Waterbury, and New Haven.

=== Law enforcement ===
Law enforcement within the geographic area of the county is provided by the respective town police departments. Prior to 2000, a County Sheriff's Department existed for the purpose of executing judicial warrants, prisoner transport, and court security. These responsibilities have now been taken over by the Connecticut State Marshal System.

=== Fire protection ===
Fire protection in the county is provided by the towns. Several towns also have fire districts that provide services to a section of the town.

Founded in 1937, New Haven County has a county-wide fire-protection agency called "New Haven County Fire Emergency Plan" based in Hamden to "Coordinate Mutual Aid - Radio Problems, assist members of county at major incidents if requested, provide training".

=== Water service ===
Water service is provided by a regional non-profit public corporation known as the South Central Connecticut Regional Water Authority. The Regional Water Authority supplies water to most of the towns within New Haven County, excluding the Waterbury area and the towns of Guilford and Madison. The Regional Water Authority is one of only two such county-wide public water service providers in the state.

=== Politics ===
As with most other Connecticut counties, New Haven County is a Democratic stronghold. The last Republican victory in New Haven County was George H. W. Bush in 1988. From the 1990s through 2012, the county increasingly trended Democratic, though since then it has become more competitive. Though he did not carry the county, Republican Donald Trump received over 40% of its vote in all three of his campaigns (2016, 2020 and 2024), a feat that Republican candidates had achieved only once in the previous six elections.

United States presidential election results for New Haven County, Connecticut
Year	Republican		Democratic		Third party(ies)	
Year	No.	%	No.	%	No.	%
1880	15,383	46.40%	17,524	52.85%	248	0.75%
1884	16,303	44.43%	19,341	52.71%	1,046	2.85%
1888	19,003	45.04%	22,113	52.41%	1,073	2.54%
1892	20,038	43.42%	24,634	53.38%	1,477	3.20%
1896	30,261	57.88%	20,212	38.66%	1,813	3.47%
1900	27,766	51.19%	25,351	46.73%	1,128	2.08%
1904	31,663	55.97%	21,744	38.44%	3,163	5.59%
1908	32,304	56.26%	22,394	39.00%	2,726	4.75%
1912	19,188	34.15%	22,364	39.80%	14,634	26.05%
1916	30,175	47.68%	30,416	48.06%	2,695	4.26%
1920	65,938	60.23%	37,977	34.69%	5,559	5.08%
1924	69,164	57.40%	36,247	30.08%	15,085	12.52%
1928	80,952	49.05%	82,657	50.08%	1,439	0.87%
1932	79,019	45.38%	86,826	49.86%	8,296	4.76%
1936	76,614	37.44%	117,308	57.33%	10,689	5.22%
1940	103,100	44.89%	126,072	54.89%	517	0.23%
1944	108,883	46.50%	123,450	52.72%	1,811	0.77%
1948	120,769	48.50%	121,591	48.83%	6,633	2.66%
1952	165,917	54.66%	136,476	44.96%	1,148	0.38%
1956	191,215	63.02%	112,208	36.98%	0	0.00%
1960	136,852	42.04%	188,685	57.96%	2	0.00%
1964	97,656	30.85%	218,743	69.10%	171	0.05%
1968	130,501	41.50%	159,653	50.78%	24,278	7.72%
1972	200,818	59.01%	135,132	39.71%	4,373	1.28%
1976	174,342	52.17%	157,402	47.10%	2,445	0.73%
1980	169,038	50.05%	130,913	38.76%	37,781	11.19%
1984	212,166	59.81%	140,945	39.74%	1,601	0.45%
1988	174,251	50.90%	163,153	47.66%	4,957	1.45%
1992	141,264	36.68%	161,374	41.90%	82,494	21.42%
1996	106,636	32.72%	178,323	54.72%	40,932	12.56%
2000	122,919	36.04%	197,928	58.03%	20,252	5.94%
2004	160,390	43.78%	199,060	54.33%	6,942	1.89%
2008	144,650	37.78%	233,589	61.01%	4,647	1.21%
2012	138,364	38.32%	218,998	60.65%	3,697	1.02%
2016	159,048	41.96%	205,609	54.25%	14,349	3.79%
2020	169,893	40.65%	242,630	58.05%	5,460	1.31%
2024	171,435	43.08%	218,981	55.02%	7,571	1.90%

United States Senate election results for New Haven County, Connecticut1
Year	Republican		Democratic		Third party(ies)	
Year	No.	%	No.	%	No.	%
2012	141,408	40.78%	199,779	57.62%	5,530	1.59%
2018	126,004	39.54%	189,456	59.45%	3,226	1.01%
2024	153,763	39.98%	224,025	58.25%	6,828	1.78%

United States Senate election results for New Haven County, Connecticut2
Year	Republican		Democratic		Third party(ies)	
Year	No.	%	No.	%	No.	%
2010	107,376	40.58%	153,377	57.97%	3,828	1.45%
2016	119,774	32.63%	239,991	65.38%	7,283	1.98%
2022	122,770	43.25%	161,063	56.74%	6	0.00%

Connecticut Gubernatorial election results for New Haven County
Year	Republican		Democratic		Third party(ies)	
Year	No.	%	No.	%	No.	%
2010	122,002	46.50%	136,276	51.95%	4,064	1.55%
2014	116,068	45.56%	135,973	53.37%	2,713	1.06%
2018	153,865	47.38%	160,406	49.39%	10,485	3.23%
2022	126,124	44.12%	157,023	54.93%	2,723	0.95%

== Transportation ==
=== Major Roads ===
==== Boston Post Road ====
U.S. Route 1 in Connecticut is the oldest east–west route in the county, running through all of its shoreline cities and towns. Known by various names along its length, most commonly "Boston Post Road" or simply "Post Road", it gradually gains latitude from west to east. Thus U.S. 1 west is officially designated "South" and east is "North".

==== Interstate 91 ====
The start of Interstate 91 begins at the interchange in New Haven with I-95. It runs parallel to U.S. Route 5 as it heads towards Hartford and Vermont.

==== Interstate 95 ====
The western portions of Interstate 95 in Connecticut are known as the Connecticut Turnpike or the Governor John Davis Lodge Turnpike in New Haven County and it crosses the state approximately parallel to U.S. Route 1. The road is most commonly referred to as "I-95". The highway is six lanes (sometimes eight lanes) throughout the county. It was completed in 1958 and is often clogged with traffic particularly during morning and evening rush hours.

With the cost of land so high along the Gold Coast, state lawmakers say they do not consider widening the highway to be fiscally feasible, although occasional stretches between entrances and nearby exits are now sometimes connected with a fourth "operational improvement" lane (for instance, westbound between the Exit 10 interchange in Darien and Exit 8 in Stamford). Expect similar added lanes in Darien and elsewhere in the Fairfield County portion of the highway in the future, lawmakers and state Department of Transportation officials say.

==== Wilbur Cross Parkway ====
The Wilbur Cross Parkway or Connecticut Route 15, is a truck-free scenic parkway that runs through the county parallel and generally several miles north of Interstate 95. It begins at the Igor I. Sikorsky Memorial Bridge and terminates at the Berlin turnpike. The parkway goes through Heroes Tunnel in New Haven.

The parkway is a National Scenic Byway and is listed on the National Register of Historic Places.

==== Interstate 84 ====
Interstate 84 in Connecticut, which runs through Danbury, is scheduled to be widened to a six-lane highway at all points between Danbury and Waterbury. State officials say they hope the widening will not only benefit drivers regularly on the route but also entice some cars from the more crowded Interstate 95, which is roughly parallel to it. Heavier trucks are unlikely to use Interstate 84 more often, however, because the route is much hillier than I-95 according to a state Department of Transportation official.

== Demographics ==
Historical population
Census	Pop.	Note	%±
1790	30,703		—
1800	32,162		4.8%
1810	37,064		15.2%
1820	39,616		6.9%
1830	43,847		10.7%
1840	48,619		10.9%
1850	65,588		34.9%
1860	97,345		48.4%
1870	121,257		24.6%
1880	156,523		29.1%
1890	209,058		33.6%
1900	269,163		28.8%
1910	337,282		25.3%
1920	415,214		23.1%
1930	463,449		11.6%
1940	484,316		4.5%
1950	545,784		12.7%
1960	660,315		21.0%
1970	744,948		12.8%
1980	761,337		2.2%
1990	804,219		5.6%
2000	824,008		2.5%
2010	862,477		4.7%
2020	864,835		0.3%
U.S. Decennial Census; 1790-1960 1900-1990; 1990-2000 2010-2020

=== 2020 census ===
As of the 2020 census, the county had a population of 864,835. Of the residents, 20.1% were under the age of 18 and 18.1% were 65 years of age or older; the median age was 40.4 years. For every 100 females there were 92.4 males, and for every 100 females age 18 and over there were 89.7 males. 94.8% of residents lived in urban areas and 5.2% lived in rural areas.

The racial makeup of the county was 62.9% White, 13.8% Black or African American, 0.5% American Indian and Alaska Native, 4.3% Asian, 0.1% Native Hawaiian and Pacific Islander, 9.0% from some other race, and 9.5% from two or more races. Hispanic or Latino residents of any race comprised 19.7% of the population.

There were 343,437 households in the county, of which 28.2% had children under the age of 18 living with them and 31.9% had a female householder with no spouse or partner present. About 30.1% of all households were made up of individuals and 12.8% had someone living alone who was 65 years of age or older.

There were 369,178 housing units, of which 7.0% were vacant. Among occupied housing units, 60.1% were owner-occupied and 39.9% were renter-occupied. The homeowner vacancy rate was 1.3% and the rental vacancy rate was 6.9%.

=== Racial and ethnic composition ===
New Haven County, Connecticut – Racial and ethnic composition Note: the US Census treats Hispanic/Latino as an ethnic category. This table excludes Latinos from the racial categories and assigns them to a separate category. Hispanics/Latinos may be of any race.
Race / Ethnicity (NH = Non-Hispanic)	Pop 1980	Pop 1990	Pop 2000	Pop 2010	Pop 2020	% 1980	% 1990	% 2000	% 2010	% 2020
White alone (NH)	659,695	661,754	616,541	582,384	509,688	86.65%	82.29%	74.82%	67.52%	58.93%
Black or African American alone (NH)	66,484	78,935	89,286	101,763	110,273	8.73%	9.82%	10.84%	11.80%	12.75%
Native American or Alaska Native alone (NH)	1,143	1,396	1,467	1,421	1,413	0.15%	0.17%	0.18%	0.16%	0.16%
Asian alone (NH)	4,218	10,204	19,061	29,933	36,995	0.55%	1.27%	2.31%	3.47%	4.28%
Native Hawaiian or Pacific Islander alone (NH)	x	x	202	196	247	x	x	0.02%	0.02%	0.03%
Other race alone (NH)	2,484	927	1,875	2,764	5,953	0.33%	0.12%	0.23%	0.32%	0.69%
Mixed race or Multiracial (NH)	x	x	12,445	14,273	30,185	x	x	1.51%	1.65%	3.49%
Hispanic or Latino (any race)	27,313	51,003	83,131	129,743	170,081	3.59%	6.34%	10.09%	15.04%	19.67%
Total	761,337	804,219	824,008	862,477	864,835	100.00%	100.00%	100.00%	100.00%	100.00%

=== 2010 census ===
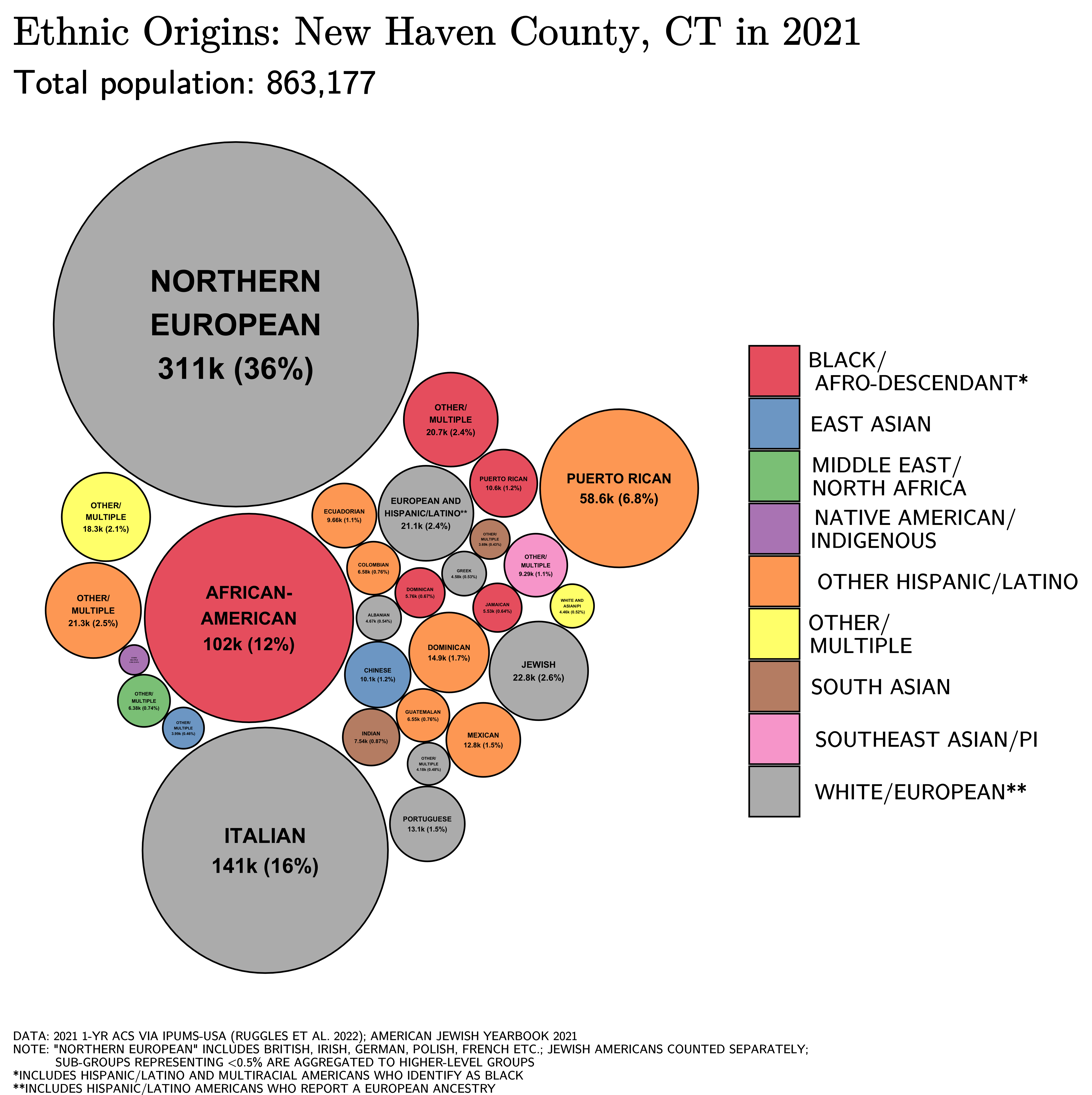
Ethnic origins in New Haven County

As of the 2010 United States census, there were 862,477 people, 334,502 households, and 215,749 families residing in the county. The population density was 1,426.7 inhabitants per square mile (550.9/km^{2}). There were 362,004 housing units at an average density of 598.8 per square mile (231.2/km^{2}). The racial makeup of the county was 74.8% white, 12.7% black or African American, 3.5% Asian, 0.3% American Indian, 6.0% from other races, and 2.6% from two or more races. Those of Hispanic or Latino origin made up 15.0% of the population. In terms of ancestry, 24.0% were Italian, 17.5% were Irish, 9.3% were German, 8.5% were English, 7.6% were Polish, and 2.0% were American.

Of the 334,502 households, 31.7% had children under the age of 18 living with them, 45.5% were married couples living together, 14.5% had a female householder with no husband present, 35.5% were non-families, and 28.9% of all households were made up of individuals. The average household size was 2.49 and the average family size was 3.09. The median age was 39.3 years.

The median income for a household in the county was $61,114 and the median income for a family was $77,379. Males had a median income of $56,697 versus $43,941 for females. The per capita income for the county was $31,720. About 7.9% of families and 10.9% of the population were below the poverty line, including 15.7% of those under age 18 and 7.1% of those age 65 or over.

=== 2000 census ===
At the 2000 census, there were 824,008 people, 319,040 households, and 210,566 families residing in the county. The population density was 1,361 inhabitants per square mile (525/km^{2}). There were 340,732 housing units at an average density of 563 per square mile (217/km^{2}). The racial makeup of the county was 79.40% White, 11.32% Black or African American, 0.25% Native American, 2.33% Asian, 0.04% Pacific Islander, 4.51% from other races, and 2.16% from two or more races. 10.09% of the population were Hispanic or Latino of any race. 24.5% were of Italian, 12.3% Irish, 6.0% Polish, 5.7% English and 5.6% German ancestry according to Census 2000. 8.73% of the population reported speaking Spanish at home, while 2.05% speak Italian.

There were 319,040 households, of which 31.20% had children under the age of 18 living with them, 48.60% were married couples living together, 13.60% had a female householder with no husband present, and 34.00% were non-families. 28.20% of all households were made up of individuals, and 11.00% had someone living alone who was 65 years of age or older. The average household size was 2.50 and the average family size was 3.08.

The age distribution was 24.50% under the age of 18, 8.70% from 18 to 24, 30.00% from 25 to 44, 22.40% from 45 to 64, and 14.50% who were 65 years of age or older. The median age was 37 years. For every 100 females, there were 92.50 males. For every 100 females age 18 and over, there were 88.70 males.

The median household income was $48,834, and the median family income was $60,549. Males had a median income of $43,643 versus $32,001 for females. The per capita income for the county was $24,439. About 7.00% of families and 9.50% of the population were below the poverty line, including 13.00% of those under age 18 and 7.70% of those age 65 or over.

=== Demographic breakdown by town ===
The following income data is from the 2010 United States Census and the 2006-2010 American Community Survey 5-Year Estimates:

Rank	Town		Per capita income	Median household income	Median family income	Population	Number of households
1	Woodbridge	Town	$73,020	$127,237	$145,321	8,990	3,336
2	Guilford	Town	$52,070	$98,411	$116,250	22,375	8,715
3	Madison	Town	$52,002	$108,175	$125,199	18,269	6,971
4	Bethany	Town	$47,241	$113,720	$121,701	5,563	1,971
5	Orange	Town	$44,983	$102,255	$115,685	13,956	5,123
6	Middlebury	Town	$44,850	$100,866	$109,750	7,575	2,748
7	Woodmont	Borough	$43,149	$71,667	$99,423	1,488	691
8	Oxford	Town	$41,909	$107,500	$113,077	12,683	4,504
9	Branford	Town	$41,540	$70,640	$86,696	28,026	12,739
10	Cheshire	Town	$40,498	$107,936	$123,539	29,261	10,041
11	Prospect	Town	$40,126	$86,526	$99,028	9,405	3,357
12	Southbury	Town	$40,022	$68,041	$104,838	19,904	8,213
13	Milford	City	$38,489	$76,973	$92,684	52,759	21,708
14	North Haven	Town	$38,286	$83,588	$94,916	24,093	9,135
15	North Branford	Town	$36,297	$80,618	$92,083	14,407	5,441
16	Hamden	Town	$34,596	$66,695	$88,613	60,960	23,727
17	Wallingford	Town	$33,839	$71,317	$87,641	45,135	18,032
18	Wolcott	Town	$33,572	$78,882	$90,061	16,680	6,007
19	Beacon Falls	Town	$32,710	$81,214	$93,056	6,049	2,360
20	Seymour	Town	$32,346	$71,719	$92,981	16,540	6,654
21	East Haven	Town	$28,638	$59,918	$69,837	29,257	11,756
22	Naugatuck	Borough	$27,933	$59,393	$71,021	31,862	12,339
23	Meriden	City	$27,625	$53,873	$65,450	60,868	23,977
24	Derby	City	$26,264	$52,029	$58,984	12,902	5,388
25	Ansonia	City	$26,225	$56,541	$71,329	19,249	7,510
26	West Haven	City	$25,884	$51,854	$62,330	55,564	21,112
27	New Haven	City	$21,789	$38,963	$47,432	129,779	48,877
28	Waterbury	City	$21,545	$40,254	$47,077	110,366	42,761

== Metropolitan statistical area ==
The United States Office of Management and Budget has designated those municipalities of the county in the South Central Connecticut Planning Region as the New Haven, CT MSA, and those municipalities of the county in the Naugatuck Valley Planning Region as within the Waterbury–Shelton MSA. These are both within the larger New Haven–Hartford–Waterbury, CT CSA, which consists of all of Connecticut besides the Bridgeport–Danbury–Stamford, CT MSA.

== Education ==
=== Primary and secondary education ===
Education in the county area is usually provided by the individual town governments. Several less populated towns have joined to form regional school districts. Bethany, Orange, and Woodbridge are part of Region 5; Middlebury and Southbury are part of Region 15; and Beacon Falls and Prospect are part of Region 16.

School districts include:

K-12:

- Ansonia School District
- Branford School District
- Cheshire Public Schools
- Derby School District
- East Haven School District
- Guilford School District
- Hamden School District
- Madison School District
- Meriden School District
- Milford School District
- Naugatuck School District
- New Haven School District
- North Branford School District
- North Haven School District
- Oxford School District
- Regional School District 15
- Regional School District 16
- Seymour School District
- Wallingford School District
- Waterbury Public Schools
- West Haven School District
- Wolcott School District
- Woodbridge School District

Secondary districts:

- Regional High School District 05

Elementary districts:

- Bethany School District
- Orange School District

=== Tertiary education ===
New Haven county serves as a center of advanced learning, with several noted educational institutions located within its borders centered on the city of New Haven. These include:

- Albertus Magnus College
- Gateway Community College
- Naugatuck Valley Community College
- Paier College of Art
- Post University
- Quinnipiac University
- Southern Connecticut State University
- University of Connecticut
- University of New Haven
- Yale University

== Communities ==
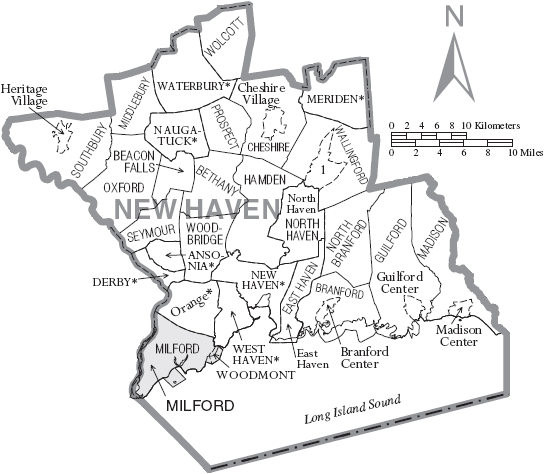
Map of New Haven County, Connecticut showing cities, boroughs, towns, and CDPs

=== Cities ===
- Ansonia
- Derby
- Meriden
- Milford
  - Devon
  - Woodmont
- New Haven
  - Amity
  - Cedar Hill
  - City Point
  - Downtown
  - East Rock
  - Fair Haven
  - Fair Haven Heights
  - Long Wharf
  - Mill River
  - Quinnipiac Meadows
  - Westville
  - Wooster Square
- Waterbury
  - Brooklyn
  - Bunker Hill
  - Bucks Hill
  - Downtown Waterbury
  - East Mountain
  - Town Plot
  - Waterville
- West Haven

=== Towns ===
Villages are named localities within towns but have no separate corporate existence from the towns they are in.

- Beacon Falls
- Bethany
- Branford
  - Branford Center
  - Short Beach
  - Stony Creek
- Cheshire
  - Cheshire Village
- East Haven
- Guilford
  - Guilford Center
- Hamden
  - Quinnipiac University
- Madison
  - Madison Center
- Middlebury
- Naugatuck (consolidated with the borough of Naugatuck)
  - Union City
- North Branford
  - Northford
  - Twin Lakes
- North Haven
- Orange
- Oxford
  - Quaker Farms
- Prospect
- Seymour
- Southbury
  - Heritage Village
  - South Britain
  - Southford
- Wallingford
  - Wallingford Center
  - Yalesville
- Wolcott
  - Woodtick
- Woodbridge

== See also ==
- List of Registered Historic Places in New Haven County, Connecticut
- Greater New Haven
- National Register of Historic Places listings in New Haven County, Connecticut
- New Haven County Cutters
- Panthean temple
