= 2004 United States presidential election in Connecticut =

- November 2, 2004
- Turnout: 78.65%

Nominee	John Kerry	George W. Bush
Party	Democratic	Republican
Home state	Massachusetts	Texas
Running mate	John Edwards	Dick Cheney
Electoral vote	7	0
Popular vote	857,488	693,826
Percentage	54.31%	43.95%

Kerry
40–50%
50–60%
60–70%
70–80%
Bush
40–50%
50–60%
60–70%
Tie
50%
President before election
George W. Bush
Republican
Elected President
George W. Bush
Republican

The 2004 United States presidential election in Connecticut took place on November 2, 2004, and was part of the 2004 United States presidential election. Voters chose seven representatives, or electors to the Electoral College, who voted for president and vice president.

Connecticut was won by Democratic nominee John Kerry by a margin of 10.4%. Prior to the election, all 12 news organizations considered this a state Kerry would win, or otherwise considered as a safe blue state. Connecticut is also the birth state of the Republican nominee, the incumbent president George W. Bush.

As of the 2024 election, this would be the last time a Republican would carry the towns of Bethel, Cheshire, and Madison, and the last time Bristol voted for the nationwide losing candidate.

== Primaries ==
- 2004 Connecticut Democratic presidential primary

== Campaign ==
=== Predictions ===
There were 12 news organizations who made state-by-state predictions of the election. Here are their last predictions before election day.

Source	Ranking
D.C. Political Report	Solid D
Associated Press	Solid D
CNN	Likely D
Cook Political Report	Solid D
Newsweek	Solid D
New York Times	Solid D
Rasmussen Reports	Likely D
Research 2000	Solid D
Washington Post	Likely D
Washington Times	Solid D
Zogby International	Likely D
Washington Dispatch	Likely D

=== Polling ===
Kerry won every single pre-election poll. The final 3 poll averaged Kerry leading 52% to 42% for Bush and 2% for Nader.

=== Fundraising ===
Bush raised $4,256,438. Kerry raised $4,195,038.

=== Advertising and visits ===
Neither campaign visited or advertised in this state during the fall campaign.

== Analysis ==
All counties but Litchfield County and congressional districts went Democratic. Litchfield County is regarded as the most conservative county in the state, along with adjacent Fairfield County to the south, although this county does tend to vote majority Democratic. Hartford County, Middlesex County, New Haven County, and New London County each are regarded as the most loyally democratic counties in Connecticut. The Republican Party's last presidential victory in Connecticut was during the 1988 election of Bush's father, George H. W. Bush. However, Kerry's victory in Connecticut was not as large as Al Gore's lead in 2000, when the then-vice president won the state by 17.47% percent and a majority of all the state's counties. However, in 2000 Gore's running mate was Connecticut Senator Joe Lieberman.

George W. Bush lost Connecticut decisively even though he was born in New Haven and is part of a family that has been a political dynasty in Connecticut for much of the 20th century. Despite his family background, as a presidential candidate, Bush was considered a Texan and largely perceived as a Southern candidate, and consequently, he had little appeal to voters in Northeastern states like Connecticut. Ironically, despite not winning his own birth state, Bush did win Colorado, Kerry's birth state, making this the only presidential election since 1864 where no candidate was able to win their state of birth. This is the first election since 1968 in which the Republican nominee won the popular vote without carrying Connecticut. Bush was the first Republican to ever win two terms without ever carrying the state.

== Results ==
2004 United States presidential election in Connecticut
Party	Candidate	Votes	Percentage	Electoral votes
Democratic	John Kerry	857,488	54.31%	7
Republican	George W. Bush (incumbent)	693,826	43.95%	0
Independent	Ralph Nader	12,969	0.82%	0
Green	David Cobb	9,564	0.61%	0
Libertarian	Michael Badnarik	3,367	0.2%	0
Concerned Citizens Party	Michael Peroutka	1,543	0.1%	0
Write In	Roger Calero	12	0.0%	0
Totals		1,578,769	100.00%	7
Voter turnout (Voting Age population)				59.6%

=== By county ===
County	John Kerry Democratic		George W. Bush Republican		Various candidates Other parties		Margin		Total votes cast
County	#	%	#	%	#	%	#	%	Total votes cast
Fairfield	205,902	51.35%	189,605	47.29%	5,460	1.36%	16,297	4.06%	400,967
Hartford	229,902	58.68%	154,919	39.54%	6,987	1.78%	74,983	19.14%	391,808
Litchfield	44,647	46.19%	50,160	51.89%	1,861	1.92%	-5,513	-5.70%	96,668
Middlesex	47,292	56.31%	35,252	41.97%	1,440	1.72%	12,040	14.34%	83,984
New Haven	199,060	54.33%	160,390	43.78%	6,942	1.89%	38,670	10.55%	366,392
New London	66,062	55.81%	49,931	42.19%	2,367	2.00%	16,131	13.62%	118,360
Tolland	39,146	54.57%	31,245	43.56%	1,338	1.87%	7,901	11.01%	71,729
Windham	25,477	52.14%	22,324	45.69%	1,060	2.16%	3,153	6.45%	48,861
Totals	857,488	54.31%	693,826	43.95%	27,455	1.74%	163,662	10.36%	1,578,769

==== Counties that flipped from Democratic to Republican ====
- Litchfield (largest municipality: Torrington)

=== By congressional district ===
Kerry won all five congressional districts, including three that elected Republicans.

District	Bush	Kerry	Representative
1st	39%	60%	John Larson
2nd	44%	54%	Rob Simmons
3rd	42%	56%	Rosa DeLauro
4th	46%	52%	Chris Shays
5th	49.0%	49.3%	Nancy Johnson

== Electors ==
Technically the voters of Connecticut cast their ballots for electors: representatives to the Electoral College. Connecticut is allocated 7 electors because it has 5 congressional districts and 2 senators. All candidates who appear on the ballot or qualify to receive write-in votes must submit a list of 9 electors, who pledge to vote for their candidate and their running mate. Whoever wins the majority of votes in the state is awarded all 7 electoral votes. Their chosen electors then vote for president and vice president. Although electors are pledged to their candidate and running mate, they are not obligated to vote for them. An elector who votes for someone other than their candidate is known as a faithless elector.

The electors of each state and the District of Columbia met on December 13, 2004, to cast their votes for president and vice president. The Electoral College itself never meets as one body. Instead the electors from each state and the District of Columbia met in their respective capitols.

The following were the members of the Electoral College from Connecticut. All were pledged to John Kerry and John Edwards:

1. Elizabeth O'Neill
2. Andrea J. Jackson-Brooks
3. Donna King
4. Larry Pleasant
5. David J. Papandrea
6. Andres Ayala
7. Joshua King

== See also ==
- United States presidential elections in Connecticut
- Presidency of George W. Bush
