= 2000 United States presidential election in Connecticut =

- November 7, 2000
- Turnout: 77.54% (▲2.55 pp)

| Nominee | Al Gore | George W. Bush | Ralph Nader |
| Party | Democratic | Republican | Green |
| Home state | Tennessee | Texas | Connecticut |
| Running mate | Joe Lieberman | Dick Cheney | Winona LaDuke |
| Electoral vote | 8 | 0 | 0 |
| Popular vote | 816,015 | 561,094 | 64,452 |
| Percentage | 55.91% | 38.44% | 4.42% |

Gore
40–50%
50–60%
60–70%
70–80%
80–90%
Bush
40–50%
50–60%
60–70%
President before election
Bill Clinton
Democratic
Elected President
George W. Bush
Republican

The 2000 United States presidential election in Connecticut took place on November 7, 2000, and was part of the 2000 United States presidential election. Voters chose eight representatives, or electors to the Electoral College, who voted for president and vice president.

Connecticut was won by Vice President Al Gore by a 17.5% margin of victory. Gore's vice presidential running mate, Joe Lieberman, had been a U.S. senator from Connecticut since 1989. Connecticut is also birth state of Republican nominee George W. Bush; however, as a presidential candidate, Bush identified his home state as Texas, where he was governor, and he did not attempt to compete in Connecticut. Since the 1990s, Connecticut has remained a safe Democratic state, having not been won by a Republican presidential candidate since Bush's father George H. W. Bush in 1988. Connecticut is also the home state of major Green Party candidate Ralph Nader.

Bush became the first Republican to win the White House without Fairfield County since James A. Garfield in 1880, and the first since 1876 to win without Litchfield County. This was also the first election since 1976 when Connecticut failed to support the overall winner of the electoral college, and presidency. Bush became the first Republican to win without Connecticut since 1968.

Connecticut was one of ten states that backed the elder Bush for president in 1988 but not the younger Bush in either 2000 or 2004.

To date, this is the last election which the towns of Beacon Falls, Sterling, and Wolcott voted for the Democratic candidate, and the last time every municipality bordering Rhode Island voted for a Democrat.

== General election ==
=== Polling ===
| Poll source | Date(s) | Sample size | Margin of error | George W. Bush (R) | Al Gore (D) | Ralph Nader (G) | Other / undecided (Note: Calculated by taking the difference of 100% and all other candidates combined.) |
|---|---|---|---|---|---|---|---|
| Harris Insights & Analytics | November 3, 2000 | 2,525 | — | 40% | 51% | 7% | 2% |

=== Results ===
2000 United States presidential election in Connecticut
| Party | Candidate | Votes | Percentage | Electoral votes |
|---|---|---|---|---|
| Democratic | Al Gore | 816,015 | 55.91% | 8 |
| Republican | George W. Bush | 561,094 | 38.44% | 0 |
| Green | Ralph Nader | 64,452 | 4.42% | 0 |
| Concerned Citizens | Howard Phillips | 9,695 | 0.66% | 0 |
| Reform | Patrick Buchanan | 4,731 | 0.32% | 0 |
| Libertarian | Harry Browne | 3,484 | 0.24% | 0 |
| Natural Law | John Hagelin (write-in) | 40 | 0.00% | 0 |
| Independent | Write Ins | 14 | 0.00% | 0 |
| Totals | | 1,459,525 | 100.00% | 8 |
| Voter turnout (Voting age) | | | | 57% |

==== By county ====
| County | Al Gore Democratic | | George W. Bush Republican | | Various candidates Other parties | | Margin | | Total votes cast |
| County | # | % | # | % | # | % | # | % | Total votes cast |
|---|---|---|---|---|---|---|---|---|---|
| Fairfield | 193,769 | 52.33% | 159,659 | 43.12% | 16,861 | 4.55% | 34,110 | 9.21% | 370,289 |
| Hartford | 221,167 | 60.17% | 127,468 | 34.68% | 18,921 | 5.15% | 93,699 | 25.49% | 367,556 |
| Litchfield | 41,806 | 47.87% | 39,172 | 44.85% | 6,360 | 7.28% | 2,634 | 3.02% | 87,338 |
| Middlesex | 43,319 | 55.94% | 29,295 | 37.83% | 4,819 | 6.22% | 14,024 | 18.11% | 77,433 |
| New Haven | 197,928 | 58.03% | 122,919 | 36.04% | 20,252 | 5.94% | 75,009 | 21.99% | 341,099 |
| New London | 60,449 | 55.38% | 41,168 | 37.72% | 7,530 | 6.90% | 19,281 | 17.66% | 109,147 |
| Tolland | 33,554 | 53.52% | 24,705 | 39.40% | 4,441 | 7.08% | 8,849 | 14.12% | 62,700 |
| Windham | 24,023 | 54.64% | 16,708 | 38.00% | 3,232 | 7.35% | 7,315 | 16.64% | 43,963 |
| Totals | 816,015 | 55.91% | 561,094 | 38.44% | 82,416 | 5.65% | 254,921 | 17.47% | 1,459,525 |

==== By congressional district ====
Gore won all six congressional districts, including three that elected Republicans.

| District | Gore | Bush | Representative |
|---|---|---|---|
| 1st | 62% | 32% | John Larson |
| 2nd | 55% | 38% | Sam Gejdenson (106th Congress) |
| 2nd | 55% | 38% | Rob Simmons (107th Congress) |
| 3rd | 60% | 34% | Rosa DeLauro |
| 4th | 55% | 41% | Chris Shays |
| 5th | 51% | 44% | James Maloney |
| 6th | 52% | 42% | Nancy Johnson |

== Electors ==
Technically the voters of Connecticut cast their ballots for electors: representatives to the Electoral College. Connecticut is allocated eight electors because it has six congressional districts and two senators. All candidates who appear on the ballot or qualify to receive write-in votes must submit a list of eight electors, who pledge to vote for their candidate and their running mate. Whoever wins the majority of votes in the state is awarded all eight electoral votes. Their chosen electors then vote for president and vice president. Although electors are pledged to their candidate and running mate, they are not obligated to vote for them. An elector who votes for someone other than their candidate is known as a faithless elector.

The electors of each state and the District of Columbia met on December 18, 2000 to cast their votes for president and vice president. The Electoral College itself never meets as one body. Instead the electors from each state and the District of Columbia met in their respective capitols.

The following were the members of the Electoral College from the state. All were pledged to and voted for Gore and Lieberman:

1. Nick Balletto
2. Frank Cirillo
3. Marilyn Cohen
4. Gloria Collins
5. Kimberly Ford
6. Thomas McDonough
7. Ken Slapin
8. Clorinda Soldevila

== See also ==
- United States presidential elections in Connecticut
- Presidency of George W. Bush
