= 1976 United States presidential election in Connecticut =

- November 2, 1976
- Turnout: 84.0%

Nominee	Gerald Ford	Jimmy Carter
Party	Republican	Democratic
Home state	Michigan	Georgia
Running mate	Bob Dole	Walter Mondale
Electoral vote	8	0
Popular vote	719,261	647,895
Percentage	52.06%	46.90%

Ford
40–50%
50–60%
60–70%
70–80%
Carter
40–50%
50–60%
60–70%
70–80%
President before election
Gerald Ford
Republican
Elected President
Jimmy Carter
Democratic

The 1976 United States presidential election in Connecticut took place on November 2, 1976. All 50 states and The District of Columbia, were part of the 1976 United States presidential election. Connecticut voters chose eight electors to the Electoral College, who voted for president and vice president.

Connecticut was won by the Republican nominees, incumbent President Gerald Ford of Michigan and his running mate Senator Bob Dole of Kansas. Ford and Dole defeated the Democratic nominees, Governor Jimmy Carter of Georgia and his running mate Senator Walter Mondale of Minnesota.

Ford narrowly carried Connecticut with 52.06% of the vote to Carter's 46.90%, a victory margin of 5.16%. As of the 2020 United States presidential election, this is the last time a Democrat has won the presidency without carrying Connecticut. The state would not vote for a losing candidate again until 2000, and for the loser of the popular vote until 2004.

== Results ==
1976 United States presidential election in Connecticut
Party	Candidate	Votes	Percentage	Electoral votes
Republican	Gerald Ford (incumbent)	719,261	52.06%	8
Democratic	Jimmy Carter	647,895	46.90%	0
American Independent	Lester Maddox	7,101	0.51%	0
Write-ins	Write-ins	5,480	0.40%	0
U.S. Labor	Lyndon LaRouche	1,789	0.13%	0
Totals		1,380,733	100.00%	8
Voter turnout				-

=== By county ===
County	Gerald Ford Republican		Jimmy Carter Democratic		Various candidates Other parties		Margin		Total votes cast
County	#	%	#	%	#	%	#	%	Total votes cast
Fairfield	209,458	58.15%	148,353	41.18%	2,413	0.67%	61,105	16.97%	360,224
Hartford	175,064	47.51%	191,257	51.90%	2,173	0.59%	-16,193	-4.39%	368,494
Litchfield	40,705	55.32%	32,419	44.06%	459	0.62%	8,286	11.26%	73,583
Middlesex	31,115	51.39%	29,097	48.05%	338	0.56%	2,018	3.34%	60,550
New Haven	174,342	52.17%	157,402	47.10%	2,445	0.73%	16,940	5.07%	334,189
New London	47,231	50.40%	45,908	48.98%	581	0.62%	1,323	1.42%	93,720
Tolland	23,703	50.41%	23,079	49.08%	242	0.51%	624	1.33%	47,024
Windham	17,643	46.11%	20,380	53.26%	239	0.63%	-2,737	-7.15%	38,262
Totals	719,261	52.06%	647,895	46.90%	14,370	1.04%	71,366	5.16%	1,381,526

==== Counties that flipped from Republican to Democratic ====
- Hartford
- Windham

=== By congressional district ===
Ford won four congressional districts, including two that elected Democrats.

District	Ford	Carter	Representative
1st	47.3%	52.7%	William R. Cotter
2nd	49.9%	50.1%	Chris Dodd
3rd	53.5%	46.5%	Robert Giaimo
4th	56.6%	43.4%	Stewart McKinney
5th	56.2%	43.8%	Ronald A. Sarasin
6th	52.3%	47.7%	Toby Moffett

== See also ==
- United States presidential elections in Connecticut
