= 2004 Connecticut Democratic presidential primary =

- March 2, 2004

62 Democratic National Convention delegates (49 pledged, 13 unpledged) The number of pledged delegates received is determined by the popular vote
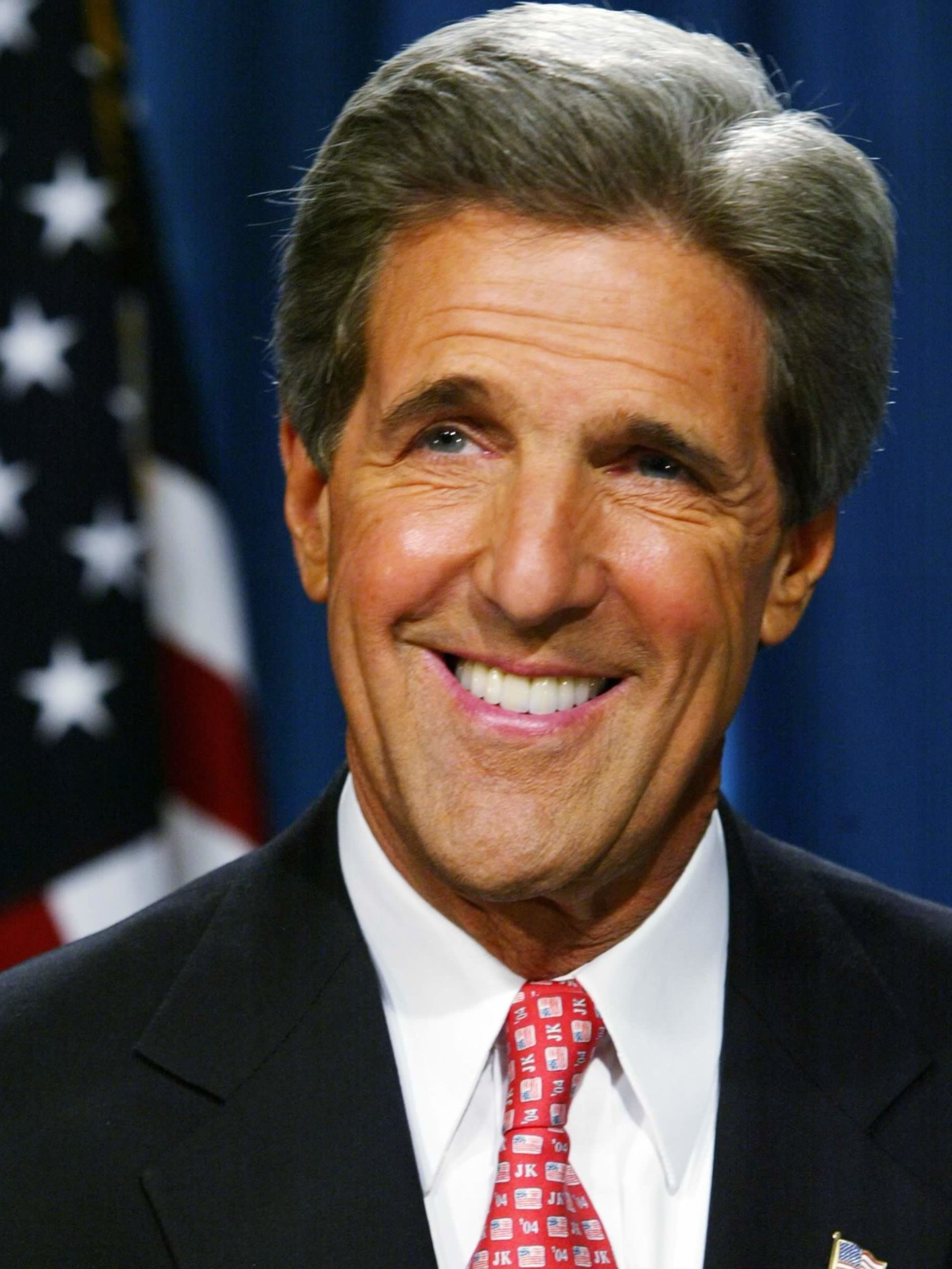

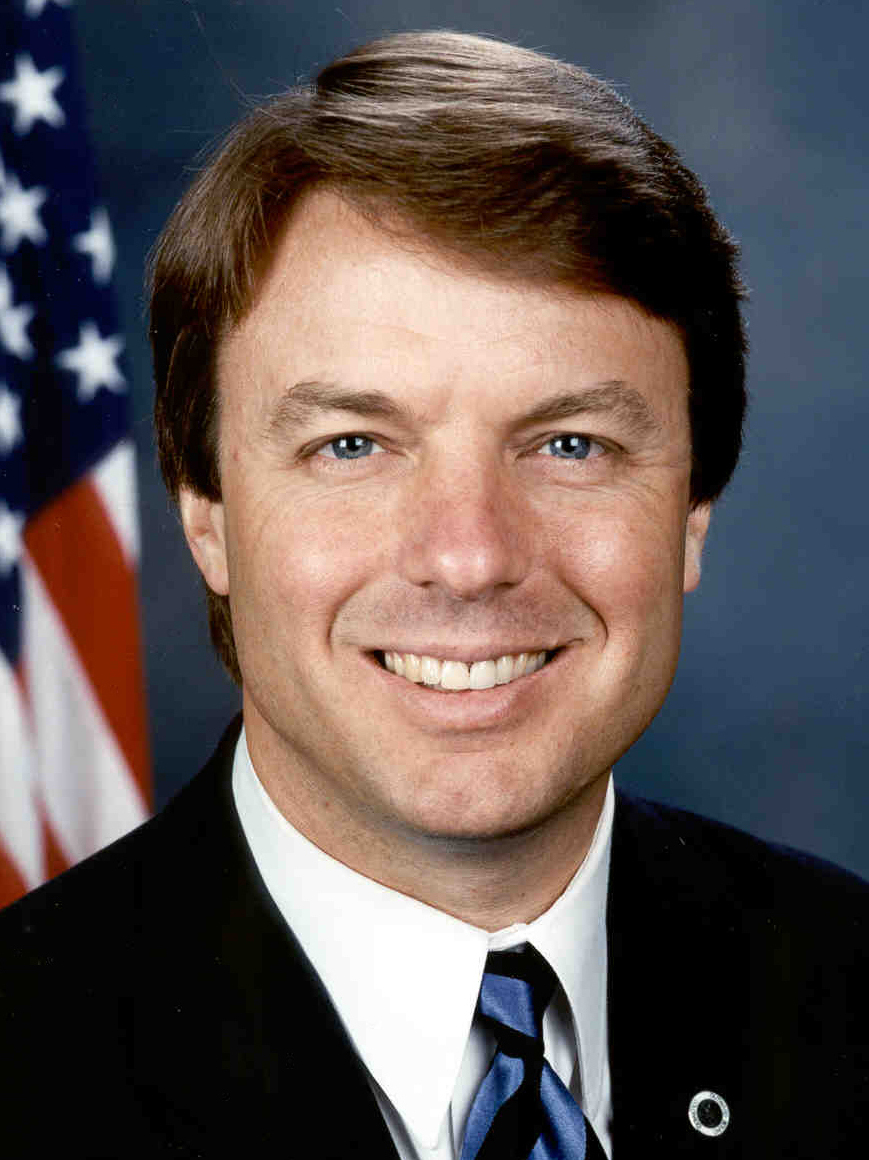

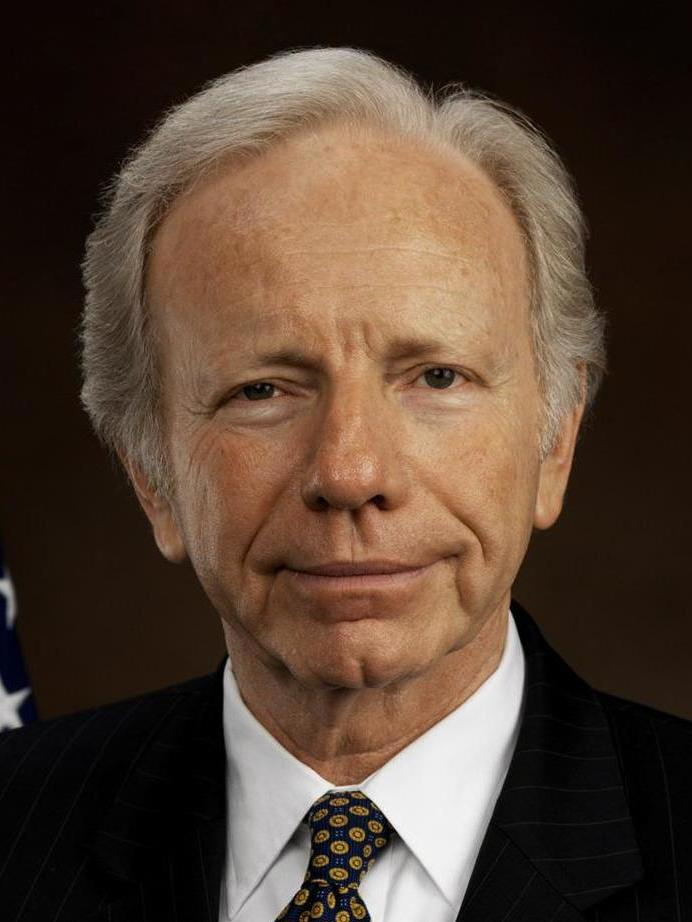
Candidate	John Kerry	John Edwards	Joe Lieberman (withdrawn)
Home state	Massachusetts	North Carolina	Connecticut
Delegate count	35	14	0
Popular vote	75,860	30,844	6,705
Percentage	58.3%	23.7%	5.2%

Kerry
40–50%
50–60%
60–70%
70–80%
80–90%

The 2004 Connecticut Democratic presidential primary was held on March 2 in the U.S. state of Connecticut as one of the Democratic Party's statewide nomination contests ahead of the 2004 presidential election.

== Results ==
2004 Connecticut Democratic Presidential Primary Results
Party	Candidate	Votes	Percentage	Delegates
Democratic	John Kerry	75,860	58.3%	35
Democratic	John Edwards	30,844	23.7%	14
Democratic	Joe Lieberman (withdrawn)	6,705	5.2%	0
Democratic	Howard Dean (withdrawn)	5,166	4.0%	0
Democratic	Dennis Kucinich	4,133	3.2%	0
Democratic	Al Sharpton	3,312	2.5%	0
Democratic	Wesley Clark (withdrawn)	1,546	1.2%	0
Democratic	Lyndon LaRouche	1,467	1.1%	0
Democratic	Uncommitted	990	0.8%	13
Totals		130,023	100.00%	62
