= 1956 United States presidential election in Connecticut =

- November 6, 1956
- Turnout: 90.67%

Nominee	Dwight D. Eisenhower	Adlai Stevenson
Party	Republican	Democratic
Home state	Pennsylvania (Note: Although he was born in Texas and grew up in Kansas before his military career, at the time of the 1952 election Eisenhower was president of Columbia University and was, officially, a resident of New York. During his first term as president, he moved his private residence to Gettysburg, Pennsylvania, and officially changed his residency to Pennsylvania.)	Illinois
Running mate	Richard Nixon	Estes Kefauver
Electoral vote	8	0
Popular vote	711,837	405,079
Percentage	63.72%	36.26%

Eisenhower
50–60%
60–70%
70–80%
80–90%
Stevenson
50–60%
President before election
Dwight D. Eisenhower
Republican
Elected President
Dwight D. Eisenhower
Republican

The 1956 United States presidential election in Connecticut took place on November 6, 1956, as part of the 1956 United States presidential election which was held throughout all contemporary 48 states. Voters chose eight representatives, or electors to the Electoral College, who voted for president and vice president.

Connecticut voted for the Republican nominee, incumbent President Dwight D. Eisenhower of Pennsylvania, over the Democratic nominee, former Governor Adlai Stevenson of Illinois. Eisenhower ran with incumbent Vice President Richard Nixon of California, while Stevenson's running mate was Senator Estes Kefauver of Tennessee. Eisenhower won Connecticut by a margin of 27.46%, which made Connecticut 12% more Republican than the nation-at-large and Eisenhower's eighth-best state in the nation.

To date, this is the last time that the cities of Middletown, New Britain, and New Haven, as well as the town of Bloomfield voted Republican. In addition, this is the last election where a Republican candidate won more than 70% in any Connecticut county or 80% in any individual Connecticut municipality.

Connecticut would not vote for a Republican presidential candidate again until Eisenhower's vice president, Richard Nixon, won the state in his re-election bid in 1972.

== Results ==
1956 United States presidential election in Connecticut
Party	Candidate	Running mate	Popular vote		Electoral vote	
Party	Candidate	Running mate	Count	%	Count	%
Republican	Dwight David Eisenhower of Pennsylvania (incumbent)	Richard Nixon of California (incumbent)	711,837	63.72%	8	100.00%
Democratic	Adlai Stevenson II of Illinois	Estes Kefauver of Tennessee	405,079	36.26%	0	0.00%
N/A	Others	Others	205	0.02%	0	0.00%
Total			1,117,121	100.00%	8	100.00%

=== By county ===
County	Dwight D. Eisenhower Republican		Adlai Stevenson Democratic		Various candidates Other parties		Margin		Total votes cast
County	#	%	#	%	#	%	#	%	Total votes cast
Fairfield	199,841	70.19%	84,890	29.81%			114,951	40.38%	284,731
Hartford	175,894	58.09%	126,923	41.91%			48,971	16.18%	302,817
Litchfield	40,029	69.91%	17,226	30.09%			22,803	39.82%	57,255
Middlesex	25,496	64.80%	13,851	35.20%			11,645	29.60%	39,347
New Haven	191,215	63.02%	112,208	36.98%			79,007	26.04%	303,423
New London	43,453	61.40%	27,317	38.60%			16,136	22.80%	70,770
Tolland	15,880	63.54%	9,111	36.46%			6,769	27.08%	24,991
Windham	20,029	59.64%	13,553	40.36%			6,476	19.28%	33,582
Totals	711,837	63.72%	405,079	36.26%	205	0.02%	306,758	27.46%	1,117,121

== See also ==
- United States presidential elections in Connecticut
