= 1960 United States presidential election in Connecticut =

- November 8, 1960
- Turnout: 93.25%

Nominee	John F. Kennedy	Richard Nixon
Party	Democratic	Republican
Home state	Massachusetts	California
Running mate	Lyndon B. Johnson	Henry Cabot Lodge Jr.
Electoral vote	8	0
Popular vote	657,055	565,813
Percentage	53.73%	46.26%

Kennedy
50–60%
60–70%
70–80%
Nixon
50–60%
60–70%
70–80%
President before election
Dwight D. Eisenhower
Republican
Elected President
John F. Kennedy
Democratic

The 1960 United States presidential election in Connecticut took place on November 8, 1960, as part of the 1960 United States presidential election, which was held throughout all 50 states. Voters chose eight representatives, or electors to the Electoral College, who voted for president and vice president.

Connecticut voted for the Democratic nominee, Senator John F. Kennedy of Massachusetts, over the Republican nominee, Vice President Richard Nixon of California. Kennedy ran with Senate Majority Leader Lyndon B. Johnson of Texas, while Nixon's running mate was Ambassador Henry Cabot Lodge Jr. of Massachusetts. Kennedy carried Connecticut by a comfortable margin of 7.47%.

To date, this is the last time that the town of Mansfield voted Republican.

== Background ==
Connecticut had not voted for the Democratic presidential nominee since the 1944 election.

== Results ==
1960 United States presidential election in Connecticut
Party	Candidate	Votes	Percentage	Electoral votes
Democratic	John F. Kennedy	657,055	53.73%	8
Republican	Richard Nixon	565,813	46.26%	0
Write-ins	Write-ins	15	0.01%	0
Totals		1,222,883	100.00%	8

=== By county ===
County	John F. Kennedy Democratic		Richard Nixon Republican		Various candidates Other parties		Margin		Total votes cast
County	#	%	#	%	#	%	#	%	Total votes cast
Fairfield	146,442	46.60%	167,778	53.39%	6	0.01%	-21,336	-6.79%	314,226
Hartford	195,403	58.88%	136,459	41.12%	2	0.00%	58,944	17.76%	331,864
Litchfield	29,062	46.05%	34,043	53.94%	3	0.01%	-4,981	-7.89%	63,108
Middlesex	22,158	50.13%	22,045	49.87%	1	0.00%	113	0.26%	44,204
New Haven	188,685	57.96%	136,852	42.04%	2	0.00%	51,833	15.92%	325,539
New London	40,625	51.62%	38,070	48.38%	1	0.00%	2,555	3.24%	78,696
Tolland	14,575	48.65%	15,386	51.35%	0	0.00%	-811	-2.70%	29,961
Windham	20,105	56.98%	15,180	43.02%	0	0.00%	4,925	13.96%	35,285
Totals	657,055	53.73%	565,813	46.27%	15	0.00%	91,242	7.46%	1,222,883

==== Counties that flipped from Republican to Democratic ====
- Middlesex
- New Haven
- New London
- Hartford
- Windham

=== Results by congressional district ===
District	Kennedy	Nixon
1st	58.9%	41.1%
2nd	51.8%	48.2%
3rd	55%	45%
4th	46.6%	53.4%
5th	42.5%	57.5%

== See also ==
- United States presidential elections in Connecticut

== Works cited ==
- Williams, John (1961). "Aspects of the American Presidential Election of 1960". Australian Quarterly. 33 (1). Australian Institute of Policy and Science: 25–36. doi:10.2307/20633678. JSTOR 20633678.
