= 2024 United States presidential election in Connecticut =

- November 5, 2024
- Turnout: 76.17% ▼

Nominee	Kamala Harris	Donald Trump
Party	Democratic	Republican
Home state	California	Florida
Running mate	Tim Walz	JD Vance
Electoral vote	7	0
Popular vote	992,053	736,918
Percentage	56.40%	41.89%

Harris
40–50%
50–60%
60–70%
70–80%
80–90%
90–100%
Trump
40–50%
50–60%
60–70%
President before election
Joe Biden
Democratic
Elected President
Donald Trump
Republican

The 2024 United States presidential election in Connecticut was held on Tuesday, November 5, 2024, as part of the 2024 United States elections in which all 50 states plus the District of Columbia participated. Connecticut voters chose electors to represent them in the Electoral College via a popular vote. The state of Connecticut has seven electoral votes in the Electoral College, following reapportionment due to the 2020 United States census in which the state neither gained nor lost a seat.

Like most of New England, Connecticut is considered solidly Democratic, having voted for Joe Biden in 2020 by more than 20%. The state last voted for a Republican presidential candidate in George H. W. Bush's landslide victory in the 1988 election.

Harris comfortably won the state by 14.5 points, performing worse than Biden in 2020, but slightly better than Clinton in 2016. Meanwhile, Trump secured 41.9% of the vote to record the best Republican performance in Connecticut since 2004. With this election being the first under the state's new Council of Government system, Harris won 6 and Trump won 3 of the 9 county-equivalents.

== Primary elections ==
=== Republican primary ===
The Connecticut Republican primary was held on April 2, 2024, alongside the New York primary.

Connecticut Republican primary, April 2, 2024
Candidate	Votes	Percentage	Actual delegate count		
Candidate	Votes	Percentage	Bound	Unbound	Total
Donald Trump	34,750	77.88%	28	0	28
Nikki Haley (withdrawn)	6,229	13.96%	0	0	0
Uncommitted	2,166	4.85%	0	0	0
Ron DeSantis (withdrawn)	1,289	2.89%	0	0	0
Ryan Binkley (withdrawn)	184	0.41%	0	0	0
Total:	44,618	100.00%	28	0	28

=== Democratic primary ===
The Connecticut Democratic primary was held on April 2, 2024.

Connecticut Democratic primary, April 2, 2024
Candidate	Votes	%	Delegates
Joe Biden (incumbent)	55,533	84.75	60
Marianne Williamson	1,490	2.27	0
Dean Phillips (withdrawn)	577	0.88	0
Cenk Uygur (withdrawn)	310	0.47	0
Uncommitted	7,619	11.63	0
Total	65,529	100%	60

=== Libertarian primary ===
The Libertarian Party of Connecticut held a ranked-choice straw poll on April 2, 2024.

2024 Connecticut Libertarian straw poll
Candidate	Round 1		T.	Round 2		T.	Round 3		T.	Round 4		T.	Round 5		T.	Round 6		T.	Round 7	
Candidate	Votes	%	T.	Votes	%	T.	Votes	%	T.	Votes	%	T.	Votes	%	T.	Votes	%	T.	Votes	%
Chase Oliver	37	34.9%	+1	38	35.8%		38	37.6%	+3	41	41.0%	+1	42	42.4%	+2	44	44.4%	+5	49	51.0%
Jacob Hornberger	12	11.3%		12	11.3%	+1	13	12.9%	+1	14	14.0%	+2	16	16.2%	+4	20	20.2%	+4	24	25.0%
Michael Rectenwald	14	14.6%		14	13.2%		14	13.9%		14	14.0%	+2	16	16.2%	+2	18	18.2%	+5	23	24.0%
Joshua Smith	10	9.4%	+1	11	10.4%		11	10.9%		11	11.0%	+2	13	13.1%	+4	17	17.2%	–17	Eliminated	
Mike ter Maat	9	8.5%		9	8.5%		9	8.9%	+1	10	10.0%	+2	12	12.1%	–12	Eliminated				
Lars Mapstead	7	6.6%	+1	8	7.5%		8	7.9%	+2	10	10.0%	–10	Eliminated							
Charles Ballay	7	6.6%	+1	8	7.5%		8	7.9%	–8	Eliminated										
None of the above	6	5.7%		6	5.7%	–6	Eliminated													
Joseph Collins Jr.	4	3.8%	–4	Eliminated																
Active ballots	106					–5	101		–1	100		–1	99					–3	96	

== General election ==
=== Predictions ===
Source	Ranking	As of
Cook Political Report	Solid D	December 19, 2023
Inside Elections	Solid D	April 26, 2023
Sabato's Crystal Ball	Safe D	June 29, 2023
Decision Desk HQ/The Hill	Safe D	December 14, 2023
CNalysis	Solid D	December 30, 2023
CNN	Solid D	January 14, 2024
The Economist	Safe D	August 28, 2024
538	Solid D	August 23, 2024
RCP	Solid D	June 26, 2024
NBC News	Safe D	October 6, 2024

=== Polling ===
Kamala Harris vs. Donald Trump vs. Robert F. Kennedy Jr.

Poll source	Date(s) administered	Sample size (Note: Key: A – all adults RV – registered voters LV – likely voters V – unclear)	Margin of error	Kamala Harris Democratic	Donald Trump Republican	Robert Kennedy Jr. Independent	Other / Undecided
MassINC Polling Group (Note: Poll sponsored by The Connecticut Mirror)	September 12–18, 2024	800 (LV)	± 3.7%	52%	37%	3%	8%

Hypothetical polling with Joe Biden and Donald Trump

Joe Biden vs. Donald Trump

Poll source	Date(s) administered	Sample size	Margin of error	Joe Biden Democratic	Donald Trump Republican	Other / Undecided
	July 21, 2024	Joe Biden withdraws from the race.				
John Zogby Strategies (Note: Poll conducted for Kennedy's campaign)	April 13–21, 2024	411 (LV)	–	55%	38%	7%
Emerson College (Note: Poll sponsored by WTNH-TV)	October 19–21, 2022	1,000 (LV)	± 3.0%	49%	40%	11%
Emerson College	September 7–9, 2022	1,000 (LV)	± 3.0%	49%	36%	15%
McLaughlin & Associates (R)	July 26–27, 2022	500 (LV)	± 4.4%	52%	39%	9%
Emerson College	May 10–11, 2022	1,000 (RV)	± 3.0%	51%	38%	11%

Hypothetical polling with other candidates

Joe Biden vs. Robert F. Kennedy Jr.

Poll source	Date(s) administered	Sample size	Margin of error	Joe Biden Democratic	Robert F. Kennedy Jr. Independent	Other / Undecided
John Zogby Strategies	April 13–21, 2024	411 (LV)	–	49%	41%	10%

Robert F. Kennedy Jr. vs. Donald Trump

Poll source	Date(s) administered	Sample size	Margin of error	Robert F. Kennedy Jr. Independent	Donald Trump Republican	Other / Undecided
John Zogby Strategies	April 13–21, 2024	411 (LV)	–	50%	33%	17%

=== Results ===
State House district results: Trump 40–50% 50–60% 60–70% / Harris 40–50% 50–60% 60–70% 70–80% 80–90% 90–100%

2024 United States presidential election in Connecticut
Party	Candidate	Votes	%	±%
Democratic	Kamala Harris; Tim Walz	992,053	56.40%	▼2.84%
Republican	Donald Trump; JD Vance	736,918	41.89%	▲2.68%
Green	Jill Stein; Butch Ware	14,281	0.81%	▲0.40%
Independent	Robert F. Kennedy Jr. (withdrawn); Nicole Shanahan (withdrawn)	8,448	0.48%	N/A
Libertarian	Chase Oliver; Mike ter Maat	6,729	0.38%	▼0.73%
Socialism and Liberation	Claudia De la Cruz (write-in); Karina Garcia (write-in)	264	0.02%	N/A
American Solidarity	Peter Sonski (write-in); Lauren Onak (write-in)	162	0.01%	N/A
Independent	Cornel West (write-in); Melina Abdullah (write-in)	128	0.01%	N/A
Independent	Shiva Ayyadurai (write-in); Crystal Ellis (write-in)	21	0.00%	N/A
Write-in		6	0.00%	▼0.03%
Total votes		1,759,010	100.00%	N/A

==== By county ====
County	Kamala Harris Democratic		Donald Trump Republican		Various candidates Other parties		Margin		Total
County	#	%	#	%	#	%	#	%	Total
Fairfield	267,019	59.04%	178,263	39.41%	7,021	1.55%	88,756	19.63%	452,303
Hartford	259,366	60.41%	162,572	37.87%	7,387	1.72%	96,794	22.54%	429,325
Litchfield	47,940	45.24%	56,452	53.27%	1,577	1.49%	-8,512	-8.03%	105,969
Middlesex	54,173	55.55%	41,654	42.71%	1,692	1.74%	12,519	12.84%	97,519
New Haven	218,981	55.02%	171,435	43.08%	7,571	1.90%	47,546	11.94%	397,987
New London	76,190	55.41%	58,858	42.81%	2,452	1.78%	17,332	12.60%	137,500
Tolland	43,311	53.13%	36,773	45.11%	1,436	1.76%	6,538	8.02%	81,520
Windham	25,073	44.08%	30,911	54.34%	903	1.59%	-5,838	-10.26%	56,887
Totals	992,053	56.40%	736,918	41.89%	30,039	1.71%	255,135	14.51%	1,759,010

==== By Council of Government ====
Council of government results: Harris 50–60% 60–70% / Trump 40–50% 50–60%

Council of Government	Kamala Harris Democratic		Donald Trump Republican		Various candidates Other parties		Margin		Total
Council of Government	#	%	#	%	#	%	#	%	Total
Capitol Planning Region	285,105	60.09%	181,038	38.16%	8,302	1.75%	104,067	21.93%	474,445
Greater Bridgeport	83,461	60.90%	51,519	37.59%	2,068	1.51%	31,942	23.31%	137,048
Lower Connecticut River Valley	58,360	55.84%	44,318	42.41%	1,826	1.75%	14,042	13.44%	104,504
Naugatuck Valley	99,237	45.61%	115,290	52.99%	3,060	1.41%	-16,053	-7.38%	217,587
Northeastern Connecticut	21,165	41.52%	29,028	56.95%	777	1.52%	-7,863	-15.43%	50,970
Northwest Hills	31,137	48.58%	31,944	49.84%	1,009	1.57%	-807	-1.26%	64,090
South Central Connecticut	156,248	58.96%	103,087	38.90%	5,673	2.14%	53,161	20.06%	265,008
Southeastern Connecticut	76,146	55.58%	58,392	42.62%	2,456	1.79%	17,754	12.96%	136,994
Western Connecticut	181,194	58.76%	122,302	39.66%	4,868	1.58%	58,892	19.10%	308,364
Totals	992,053	56.40%	736,918	41.89%	30,039	1.71%	255,135	14.51%	1,759,010

==== By congressional district ====
Harris won all five congressional districts.

District	Harris	Trump	Representative
1st	60.61%	37.73%	John B. Larson
2nd	53.03%	45.30%	Joe Courtney
3rd	56.07%	42.01%	Rosa DeLauro
4th	60.90%	37.54%	Jim Himes
5th	52.01%	46.42%	Jahana Hayes

== Analysis ==
Harris won all five congressional districts, performing best in the fourth district, matching Biden's strongest result there in 2020. However, she ceded ground by 1.71% to 3.93% across districts compared to 2020, despite a uniform victory. Such a result was also consistent with her underperformance in comparison to Democratic nominees for the election to the House of Representatives.

Conversely, Trump outran Republican nominees in four out of five districts, earning a poorer result in the fifth district. He still improved on his 2020 performance in all five districts, gaining 2.01% to 3.71% more votes.

Fourteen towns that voted for Biden in 2020 voted for Trump in 2024: Andover, Bristol, Brookfield, Burlington, Derby, Durham, Haddam, Hampton, Montville, New Milford, North Canaan, Suffield, Willington, and Woodstock. One town (Warren) that voted for Trump in 2020 voted for Harris in 2024.

A graphical representation of Harris's (top) and Trump's (bottom) in comparison to 2024 House election (left) and 2020 presidential election (right)

== See also ==
- United States presidential elections in Connecticut
- 2024 United States presidential election
- 2024 Democratic Party presidential primaries
- 2024 Republican Party presidential primaries
- 2024 United States elections

== Notes ==
Partisan clients
