= 1968 United States presidential election in Connecticut =

- November 5, 1968
- Turnout: 88.79%

| Nominee | Hubert Humphrey | Richard Nixon | George Wallace |
| Party | Democratic | Republican | George Wallace Party (Note: On the Connecticut ballot, George Wallace was listed as the candidate of the "George Wallace Party") |
| Home state | Minnesota | New York (Note: Although he was born in California and he served as a U.S. senator from California, in 1968 Richard Nixon's official state of residence was New York, because he moved there to practice law after his defeat in the 1962 California gubernatorial election. During his first term as president, Nixon re-established his residency in California. Consequently, most reliable reference books list Nixon's home state as New York in the 1968 election and his home state as California in the 1972 (and 1960) election.) | Alabama |
| Running mate | Edmund Muskie | Spiro Agnew | Curtis LeMay |
| Electoral vote | 8 | 0 | 0 |
| Popular vote | 621,561 | 556,721 | 76,650 |
| Percentage | 49.48% | 44.32% | 6.10% |

Humphrey
40–50%
50–60%
60–70%
70–80%
Nixon
40–50%
50–60%
60–70%
70–80%
President before election
Lyndon B. Johnson
Democratic
Elected President
Richard Nixon
Republican

The 1968 United States presidential election in Connecticut took place on November 5, 1968, as part of the 1968 United States presidential election, which was held throughout all 50 states and D.C. Voters chose eight representatives, or electors to the Electoral College, who voted for president and vice president.

Connecticut voted for the Democratic nominee, incumbent Vice President Hubert H. Humphrey of Minnesota, over the Republican nominee, former Vice President Richard Nixon of New York and American Independent candidate, referred to on the ballot as the "George Wallace Party," Southern populist Governor George Wallace of Alabama. Humphrey's running mate was Senator Edmund Muskie of Maine, while Nixon ran with Governor Spiro Agnew of Maryland and Wallace's running mate was Curtis LeMay of California.

Humphrey carried Connecticut by a fair margin of 5.16%. This marked the first time since 1888 that Connecticut would back a losing Democrat in a presidential election, and remained the last such occasion until 2000. This was also the last presidential election until Bill Clinton in 1992 that a Democratic candidate would win the state, after which it has always gone Democratic.

To date, this is the last time that the towns of Prospect and Watertown voted Democratic.

== Results ==
1968 United States presidential election in Connecticut
| Party | Candidate | Votes | Percentage | Electoral votes |
|---|---|---|---|---|
| Democratic | Hubert H. Humphrey | 621,561 | 49.48% | 8 |
| Republican | Richard Nixon | 556,721 | 44.32% | 0 |
| George Wallace Party | George Wallace | 76,650 | 6.10% | 0 |
| Write-ins | Write-ins | 1,300 | 0.10% | 0 |
| Totals | | 1,256,232 | 100.00% | 8 |

=== By county ===
| County | Hubert Humphrey Democratic | | Richard Nixon Republican | | Various candidates Other parties | | Margin | | Total votes cast |
| County | # | % | # | % | # | % | # | % | Total votes cast |
|---|---|---|---|---|---|---|---|---|---|
| Fairfield | 139,364 | 41.69% | 173,108 | 51.78% | 21,820 | 6.53% | -33,744 | -10.09% | 334,292 |
| Hartford | 190,865 | 56.19% | 131,740 | 38.78% | 17,096 | 5.03% | 59,125 | 17.41% | 339,701 |
| Litchfield | 29,340 | 45.57% | 31,429 | 48.82% | 3,611 | 5.61% | -2,089 | -3.25% | 64,380 |
| Middlesex | 23,727 | 48.90% | 21,999 | 45.34% | 2,798 | 5.76% | 1,728 | 3.56% | 48,524 |
| New Haven | 159,653 | 50.78% | 130,501 | 41.50% | 24,278 | 7.72% | 29,152 | 9.28% | 314,432 |
| New London | 41,507 | 49.66% | 37,116 | 44.41% | 4,951 | 5.93% | 4,391 | 5.25% | 83,574 |
| Tolland | 18,007 | 49.13% | 16,666 | 45.47% | 1,982 | 5.40% | 1,341 | 3.66% | 36,655 |
| Windham | 19,098 | 55.08% | 14,162 | 40.84% | 1,414 | 4.08% | 4,936 | 14.24% | 34,674 |
| Totals | 621,561 | 49.48% | 556,721 | 44.32% | 77,950 | 6.20% | 64,840 | 5.16% | 1,256,232 |

==== Counties that flipped from Democratic to Republican ====
- Fairfield
- Litchfield

== See also ==
- United States presidential elections in Connecticut
