= 1884 United States presidential election in Connecticut =

- November 4, 1884

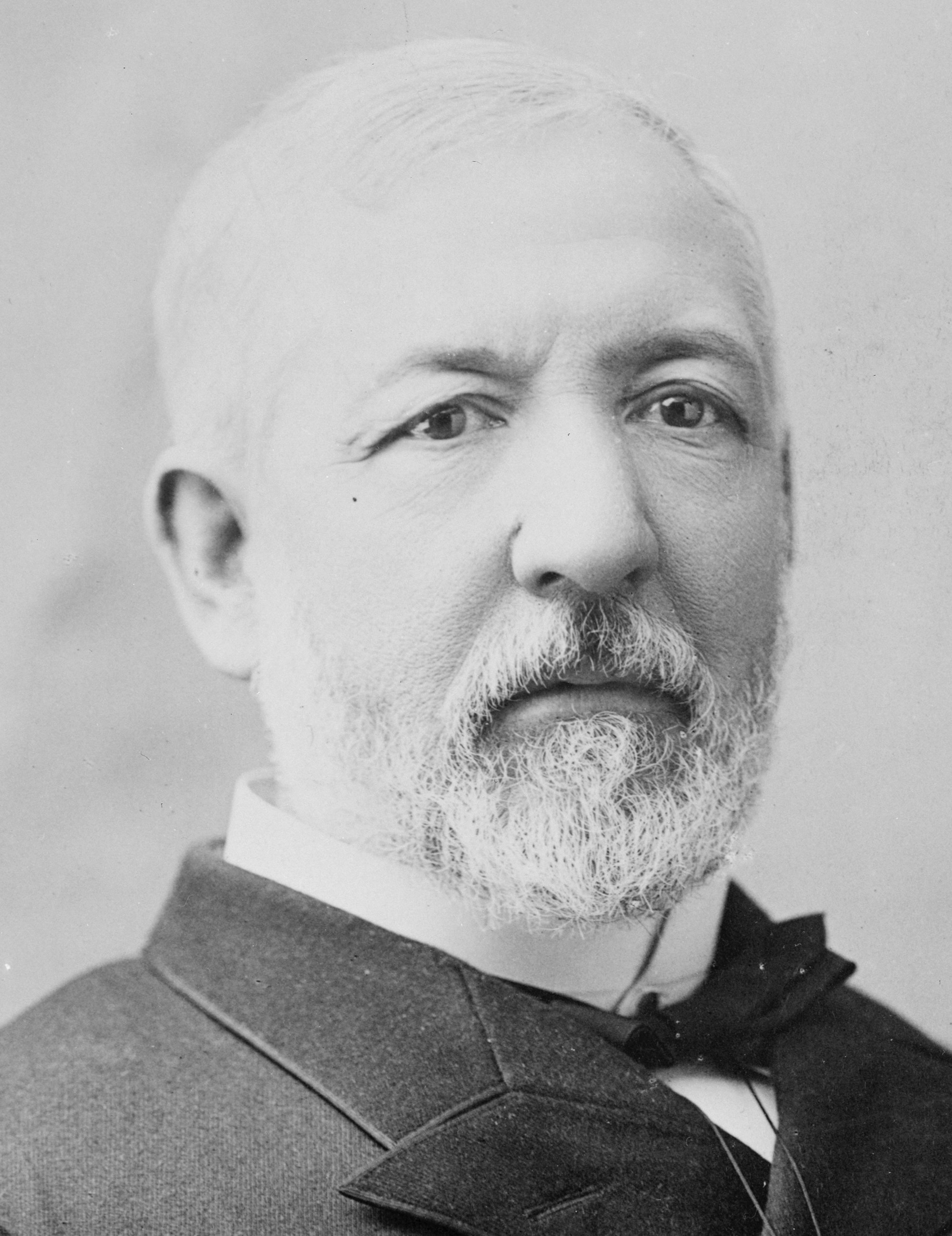
Nominee	Grover Cleveland	James G. Blaine
Party	Democratic	Republican
Home state	New York	Maine
Running mate	Thomas A. Hendricks	John A. Logan
Electoral vote	6	0
Popular vote	67,182	65,898
Percentage	48.95%	48.01%

Cleveland
40–50%
50–60%
60–70%
70–80%
Blaine
50–60%
60–70%
70–80%
President before election
Chester A. Arthur
Republican
Elected President
Grover Cleveland
Democratic

The 1884 United States presidential election in Connecticut took place on November 4, 1884, as part of the 1884 United States presidential election. Voters chose six representatives, or electors to the Electoral College, who voted for president and vice president.

Connecticut voted for the Democratic nominee, Grover Cleveland, over the Republican nominee, James G. Blaine. Cleveland won the state by a very narrow margin of 0.94%. Cleveland was the first Democrat to win without New London County since 1844 and Middlesex County since 1832.

== Results ==
1884 United States presidential election in Connecticut
Party	Candidate	Running mate	Popular vote		Electoral vote	
Party	Candidate	Running mate	Count	%	Count	%
Democratic	Grover Cleveland of New York	Thomas Andrews Hendricks of Indiana	67,182	48.95%	6	100.00%
Republican	James Gillespie Blaine of Maine	John Alexander Logan of Illinois	65,898	48.01%	0	0.00%
Prohibition	John Pierce St. John of Kansas	William Daniel of Maryland	2,493	1.82%	0	0.00%
Greenback	Benjamin Franklin Butler of Massachusetts	Absolom Madden West of Mississippi	1,684	1.23%	0	0.00%
Total			137,257	100.00%	6	100.00%

== See also ==
- United States presidential elections in Connecticut
