= 1804 United States presidential election in Connecticut =

- November 1 or 2, 1804 (Note: The election took place during the October session of the Connecticut General Assembly, which adjourned on November 2. The Assembly resolution appointing the electors is not dated. The earliest legal date for the election was November 1, 34 days preceding the first Wednesday in December.)
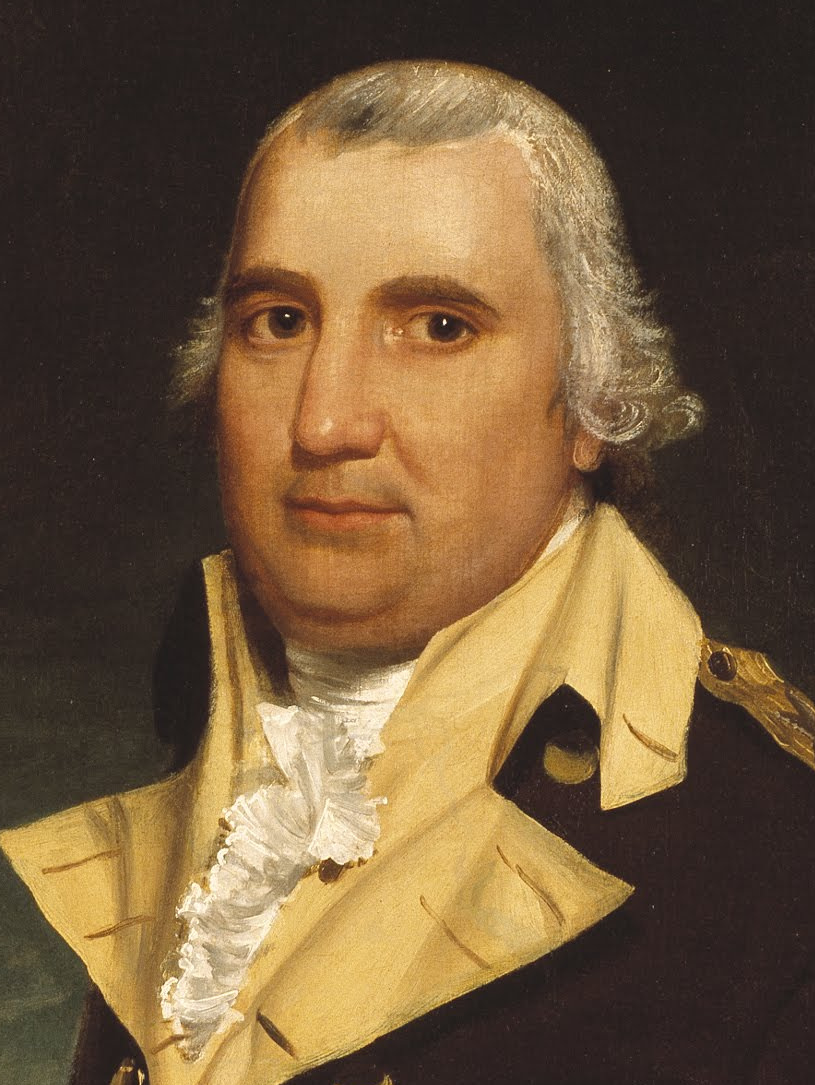
| Nominee | Charles Cotesworth Pinckney |
| Party | Federalist |
| Home state | South Carolina |
| Running mate | Rufus King |
| Electoral vote | 9 |
President before election
Thomas Jefferson
Democratic-Republican
Elected President
Thomas Jefferson
Democratic-Republican

A presidential election was held in Connecticut in 1804, as part of the 1804 United States presidential election. The Connecticut General Assembly chose nine electors, all Federalists, who voted for former U.S. minister to France Charles Cotesworth Pinckney and former U.S. minister to Great Britain Rufus King.

Pinckney lost the national election in a landslide to the Democratic-Republican incumbent president, Thomas Jefferson. Connecticut was one of two states to back the losing Federalist candidates, in addition to Delaware and two single-member districts in Maryland.

== General election ==
1804 United States presidential election in Connecticut
| Party | Candidate |
|---|---|
| Federalist | David Daggett |
| Federalist | Oliver Ellsworth |
| Federalist | Sylvester Gilbert |
| Federalist | Joshua Huntington |
| Federalist | Asher Miller |
| Federalist | David Smith |
| Federalist | Lewis B. Sturges |
| Federalist | John Treadwell |
| Federalist | Jonathan Trumbull Jr. |

== See also ==
- United States presidential elections in Connecticut

== Bibliography ==
- Dauer, Manning Julian (2002). "Election of 1804". In Schlesinger, Arthur M. Jr.; Israel, Fred L. (eds.). History of American Presidential Elections, 1789–2001. Vol. 1. Philadelphia: Chelsea House Publishers. pp. 159–82.
- Lipson, Dorothy Ann, ed. (1986). The Public Records of the State of Connecticut. Vol. 12. Hartford: Connecticut State Library.
- Stanwood, Edward (1896). A History of Presidential Elections (4th ed.). Boston: Houghton, Mifflin, and Company.
