= 1860 United States presidential election in Connecticut =

- November 2, 1860
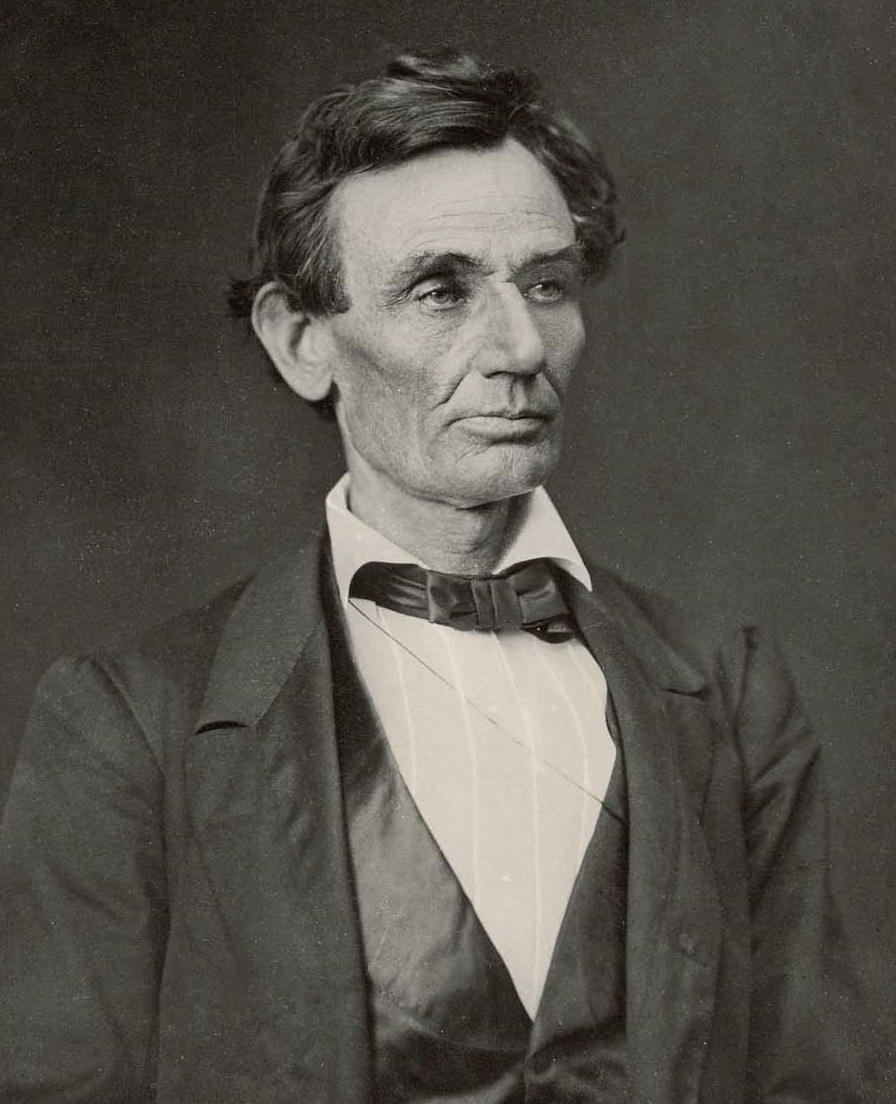

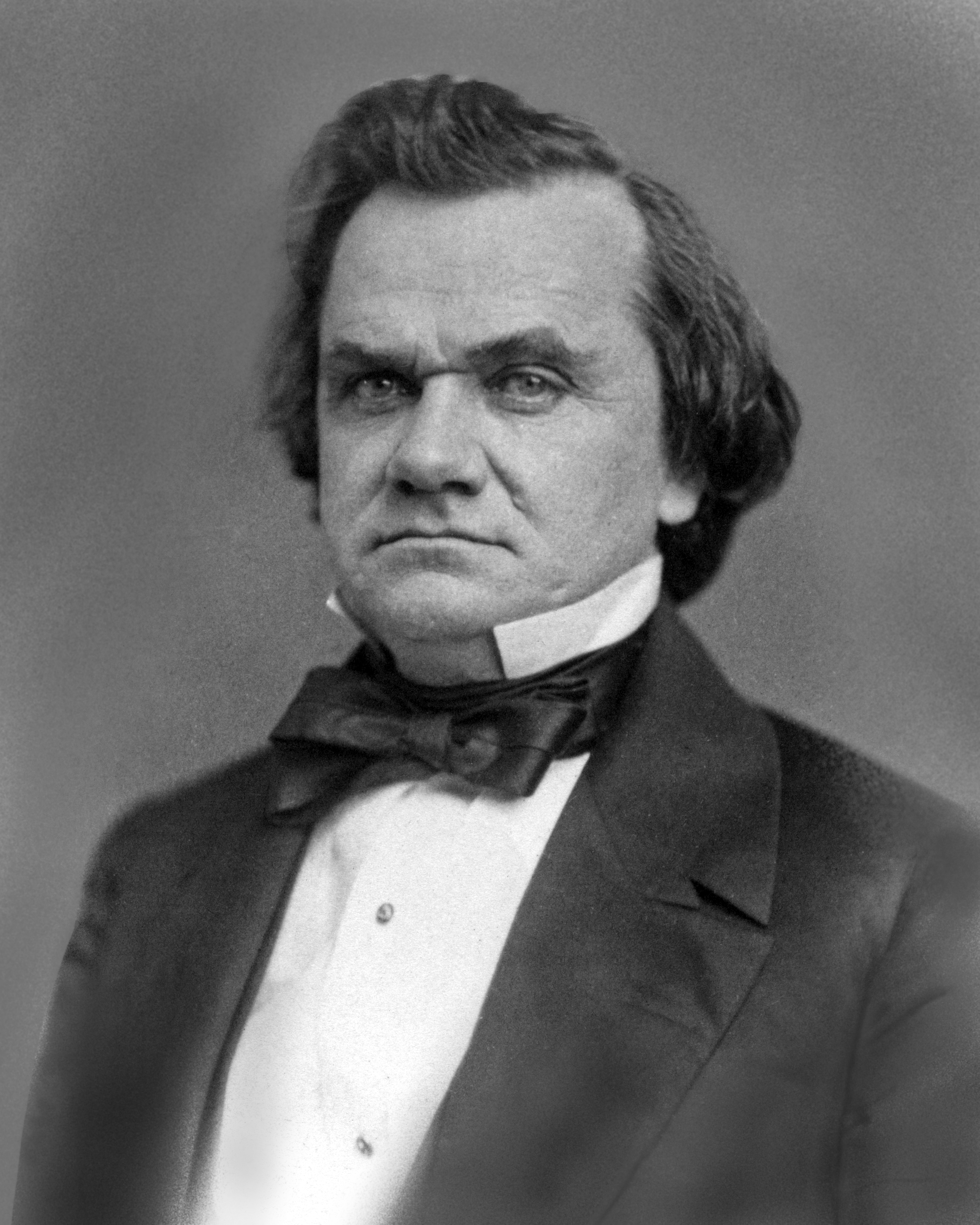

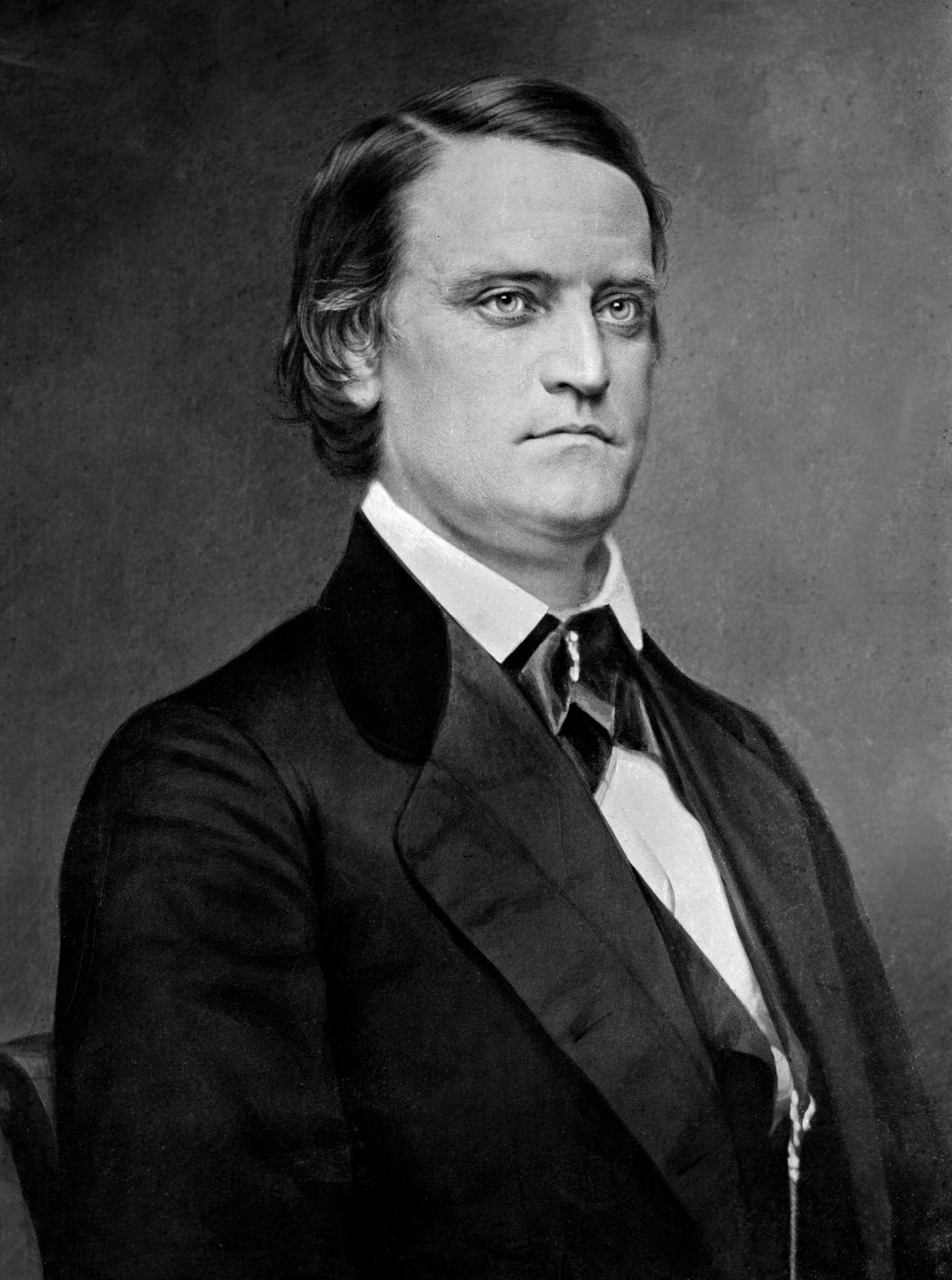
Nominee	Abraham Lincoln	Stephen A. Douglas	John C. Breckinridge
Party	Republican	Democratic	Southern Democratic
Home state	Illinois	Illinois	Kentucky
Running mate	Hannibal Hamlin	Herschel V. Johnson	Joseph Lane
Electoral vote	6	0	0
Popular vote	43,486	17,364	16,558
Percentage	53.86%	21.50%	20.51%

Lincoln
30–40%
40–50%
50–60%
60–70%
70–80%
80–90%
Douglas
30–40%
40–50%
50–60%
Breckinridge
30–40%
40–50%
50–60%
60–70%
President before election
James Buchanan
Democratic
Elected President
Abraham Lincoln
Republican

The 1860 United States presidential election in Connecticut took place on November 2, 1860, as part of the 1860 United States presidential election. Voters chose six electors of the Electoral College, who voted for president and vice president.

Connecticut was won by Republican candidate Abraham Lincoln, who won by a margin of 32.36%.

== Results ==
1860 United States presidential election in Connecticut
Party	Candidate	Running mate	Popular vote		Electoral vote	
Party	Candidate	Running mate	Count	%	Count	%
Republican	Abraham Lincoln of Illinois	Hannibal Hamlin of Maine	43,486	53.86%	6	100.00%
Democratic	Stephen Arnold Douglas of Illinois	Herschel Vespasian Johnson of Georgia	17,364	21.50%	0	0.00%
Southern Democratic	John Cabell Breckinridge of Kentucky	Joseph Lane of Oregon	16,558	20.51%	0	0.00%
Constitutional Union	John Bell of Tennessee	Edward Everett of Massachusetts	3,337	4.13%	0	0.00%
Total			80,745	100.00%	6	100.00%

=== Results by county ===
County	Abraham Lincoln Republican		Stephen A. Douglas Democratic		John C. Breckinridge Southern Democratic		John Bell Constitutional Union		Margin		Total votes cast
County	#	%	#	%	#	%	#	%	#	%	Total votes cast
Fairfield	7,025	43.66%	3,177	19.74%	3,835	23.83%	2,055	12.77%	3,190 (Note: In this county where Breckinridge ran second ahead of Douglas, margin given is Lincoln vote minus Breckinridge vote and percentage margin Lincoln percentage minus Breckinridge percentage.)	19.83%	16,092
Hartford	8,510	56.15%	3,257	21.49%	3,088	20.37%	301	1.99%	5,253	34.66%	15,156
Litchfield	4,812	59.04%	1,727	21.19%	1,567	19.23%	44	0.54%	3,085	37.85%	8,150
Middlesex	2,886	52.38%	1,180	21.42%	1,335	24.23%	109	1.98%	1,551	28.15%	5,510
New Haven	8,668	52.41%	2,931	17.72%	4,368	26.41%	573	3.46%	4,300	26.00%	16,540
New London	5,474	57.74%	2,597	27.39%	1,199	12.65%	211	2.23%	2,877	30.35%	9,481
Tolland	2,494	60.39%	1,139	27.58%	479	11.60%	18	0.44%	1,355	32.81%	4,130
Windham	3,619	67.04%	1,456	26.97%	303	5.61%	20	0.37%	2,163	40.07%	5,398
Totals:	43,486	53.86%	17,364	21.50%	16,558	20.51%	3,337	4.13%	26,122	32.36%	80,745

==== Counties that flipped from Democratic to Republican ====
- Middlesex

== See also ==
- United States presidential elections in Connecticut
