= 1988 United States presidential election in Connecticut =

- November 8, 1988
- Turnout: 81.4%

Nominee	George H. W. Bush	Michael Dukakis
Party	Republican	Democratic
Home state	Texas	Massachusetts
Running mate	Dan Quayle	Lloyd Bentsen
Electoral vote	8	0
Popular vote	750,241	676,584
Percentage	51.98%	46.87%

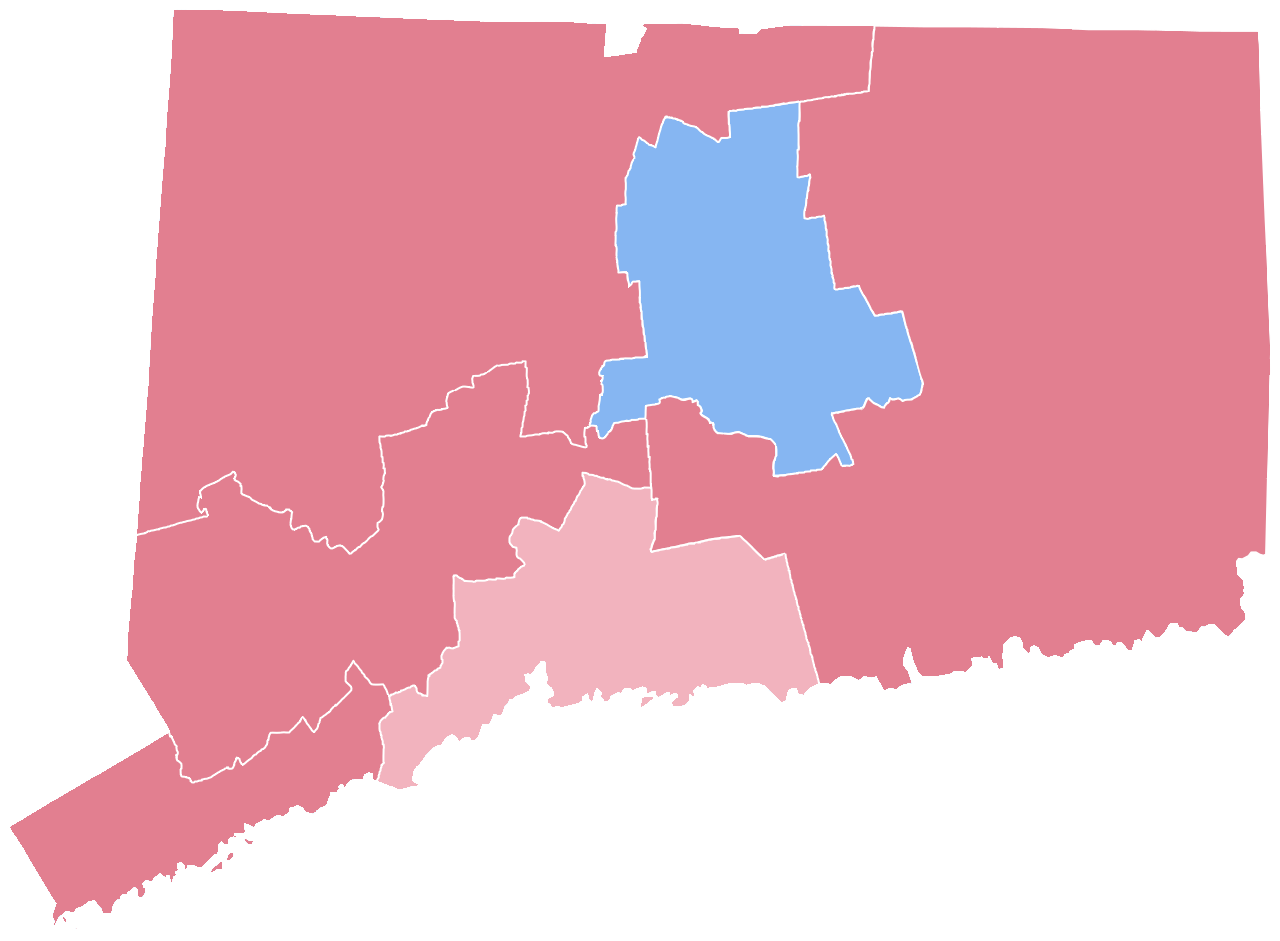
Bush
40–50%
50–60%
60–70%
70–80%
Dukakis
40–50%
50–60%
60–70%
70–80%
President before election
Ronald Reagan
Republican
Elected President
George H. W. Bush
Republican

The 1988 United States presidential election in Connecticut took place on November 8, 1988, as part of the 1988 United States presidential election, which was held throughout all 50 states and D.C. Voters chose eight representatives, or electors, to the Electoral College, who voted for president and vice president.

Connecticut voted for the Republican nominee, Vice President George H. W. Bush, over the Democratic nominee, Massachusetts Governor Michael Dukakis, by a margin of 5.10%. Bush took 51.98% of the vote to Dukakis's 46.87%. This result nonetheless made Connecticut 2.7% more Democratic than the nation-at-large. The state had connections with Bush, who was raised there and attended Yale University from 1945 to 1948. His eldest son, the future president George W. Bush was born in 1946, and his father, Prescott Bush, served as senator for the state from 1952 to 1963.

Although Dukakis won only Hartford County, he took 47–49% of the vote in five other counties, making it a close race state-wide. He came much closer to winning the state than Walter Mondale, who had lost the state by over 20 points four years earlier. Dukakis's gains reflected liberal New England's drift as a whole toward the Democratic Party, as the Republican Party became increasingly conservative and oriented toward the South. This would be the last time that a Republican presidential candidate would win Connecticut's electoral votes, as the state has gone Democratic in every election since, and also one of the last times that a Republican won a statewide federal election there.

To date, this is the last election in which the counties of New Haven, New London, Middlesex, and Tolland voted for the Republican candidate, as well as the last time that the cities of Norwalk, Stamford, and Waterbury and the towns of Branford, Canaan, Canton, Chester, Clinton, Cromwell, Deep River, East Lyme, Farmington, Glastonbury, Groton, Guilford, Stratford, Kent, Norfolk, Old Lyme, Pomfret, Salisbury, Sharon, South Windsor, Stonington, Tolland, Vernon, Washington, Waterford, Westport, Wethersfield, and Woodbridge voted Republican.

== Results ==
1988 United States presidential election in Connecticut
Party	Candidate	Votes	Percentage	Electoral votes
Republican	George H. W. Bush	750,241	51.98%	8
Democratic	Michael Dukakis	676,584	46.87%	0
Libertarian	Ron Paul	14,071	0.97%	0
New Alliance	Lenora Fulani	2,491	0.17%	0
No party	William A. Marra (write-in)	7	0.00%	0
Totals		1,443,394	100.00%	8
Voter turnout (voting age/registered)				58%/80%

=== Results by county ===
County	George H.W. Bush Republican		Michael Dukakis Democratic		Various candidates Other parties		Margin		Total votes cast
County	#	%	#	%	#	%	#	%	Total votes cast
Fairfield	221,316	59.04%	149,630	39.91%	3,932	1.05%	71,686	19.13%	374,878
Hartford	173,031	45.95%	199,857	53.08%	3,648	0.97%	-26,826	-7.13%	376,536
Litchfield	44,637	55.97%	34,227	42.91%	893	1.12%	10,410	13.06%	79,757
Middlesex	34,682	50.01%	33,946	48.95%	716	1.04%	736	1.06%	69,344
New Haven	174,251	50.90%	163,153	47.66%	4,957	1.44%	11,098	3.24%	342,361
New London	52,681	51.22%	48,882	47.53%	1,288	1.25%	3,799	3.69%	102,851
Tolland	28,375	50.80%	26,884	48.13%	602	1.07%	1,491	2.67%	55,861
Windham	21,268	50.88%	20,005	47.86%	526	1.26%	1,263	3.02%	41,799
Totals	750,241	51.98%	676,584	46.87%	16,569	1.15%	73,657	5.11%	1,443,394

==== Counties that flipped from Republican to Democratic ====
- Hartford

== See also ==
- United States presidential elections in Connecticut
- Presidency of George H. W. Bush
