= 1872 United States presidential election in Connecticut =

- November 5, 1872
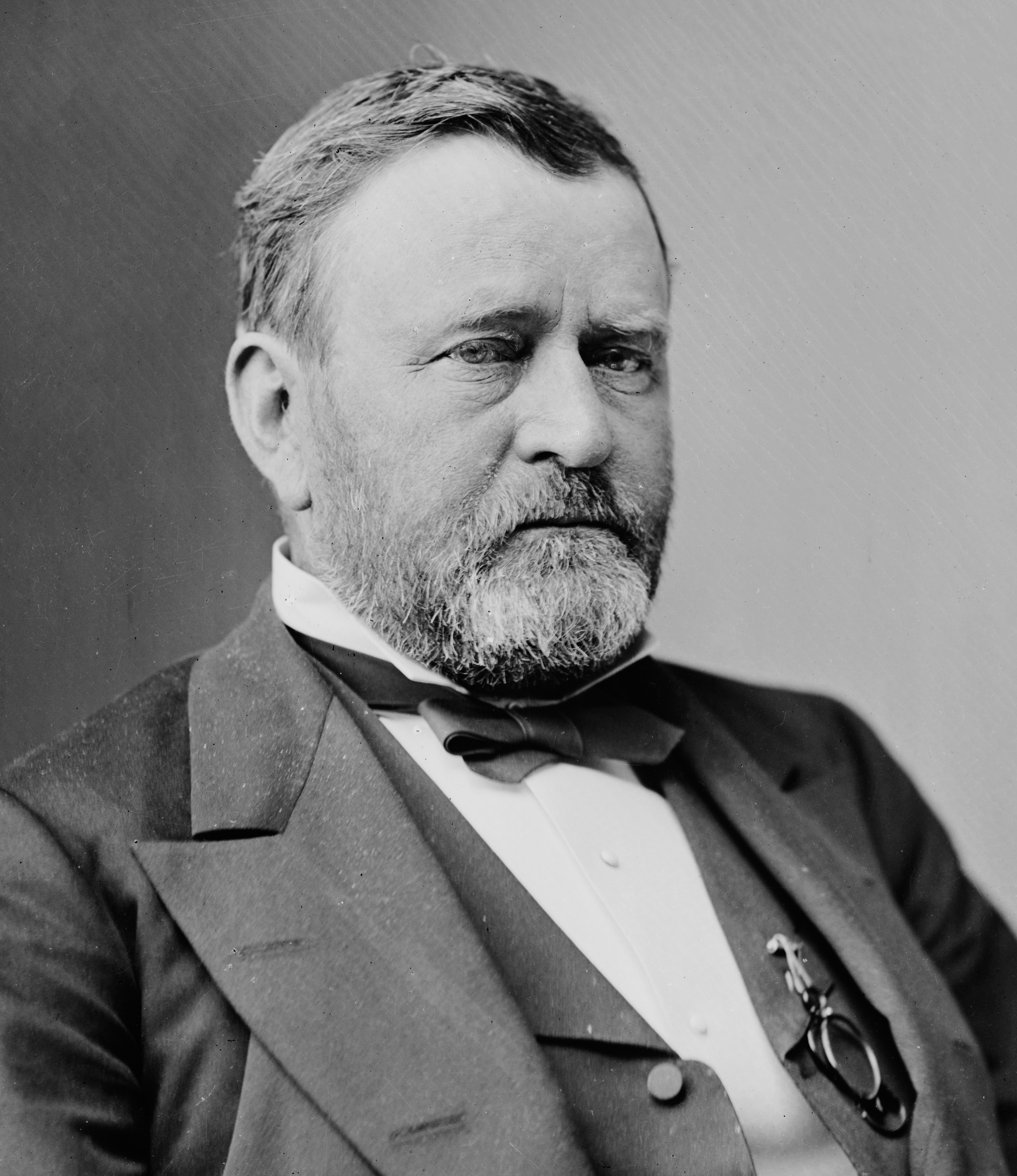

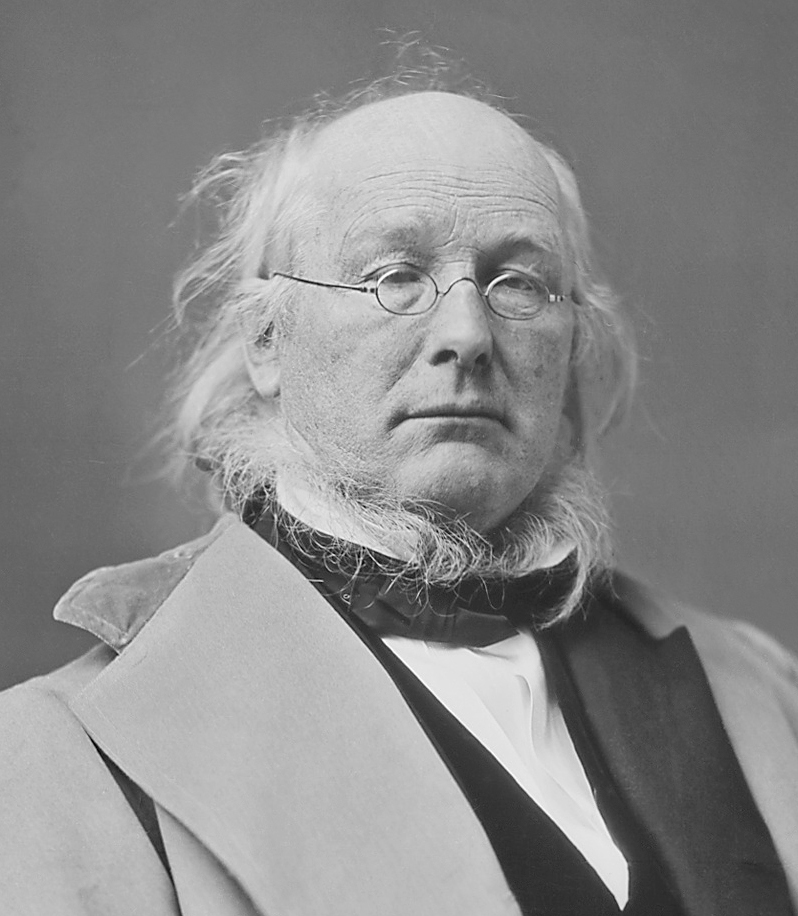
Nominee	Ulysses S. Grant	Horace Greeley
Party	Republican	Liberal Republican
Home state	Illinois	New York
Running mate	Henry Wilson	Benjamin G. Brown
Electoral vote	6	0
Popular vote	50,314	45,695
Percentage	52.41%	47.59%

Grant
50–60%
60–70%
70–80%
Greeley
50–60%
60–70%
70–80%
Tie
50%
No Data/Vote:
President before election
Ulysses S. Grant
Republican
Elected President
Ulysses S. Grant
Republican

The 1872 United States presidential election in Connecticut took place on November 5, 1872. All contemporary 37 states were part of the 1872 United States presidential election. The state voters chose six electors to the Electoral College, which selected the president and vice president.

Connecticut was won by the Republican nominees, incumbent President Ulysses S. Grant of Illinois and his running mate Senator Henry Wilson of Massachusetts. Grant and Wilson defeated the Liberal Republican and Democratic nominees, former Congressman Horace Greeley of New York and his running mate former Senator and Governor Benjamin Gratz Brown of Missouri by a narrow margin of 4.82%.

== Results ==
1872 United States presidential election in Connecticut
Party	Candidate	Running mate	Popular vote		Electoral vote	
Party	Candidate	Running mate	Count	%	Count	%
Republican	Ulysses S. Grant of Illinois	Henry Wilson of Massachusetts	50,314	52.41%	6	100.00%
Liberal Republican	Horace Greeley of New York	Benjamin Gratz Brown of Missouri	45,695	47.59%	0	0.00%
Total			96,009	100.00%	6	100.00%

=== Results by county ===
County	Ulysses Grant Republican		Horace Greeley Liberal Republican		Margin		Total votes cast
County	#	%	#	%	#	%	#
Fairfield	8,401	49.66%	8,515	50.34%	-114	-0.68%	16,916
Hartford	10,623	51.02%	10,197	48.98%	426	2.04%	20,820
Litchfield	4,565	50.89%	4,405	49.11%	160	1.78%	8,970
Middlesex	3,447	57.01%	2,599	42.99%	848	14.02%	6,046
New Haven	11,026	50.19%	10,941	49.81%	85	17.40%	21,967
New London	6,108	54.99%	4,999	45.01%	1,109	9.98%	11,107
Tolland	2,355	54.38%	1,976	45.62%	379	8.76%	4,331
Windham	3,789	64.74%	2,064	35.26%	1,725	29.48%	5,853
Total	50,314	52.41%	45,695	47.59%	4,619	4.82%	96,009

== See also ==
- United States presidential elections in Connecticut
