= 1948 United States presidential election in Connecticut =

- November 2, 1948
- Turnout: 86.16%
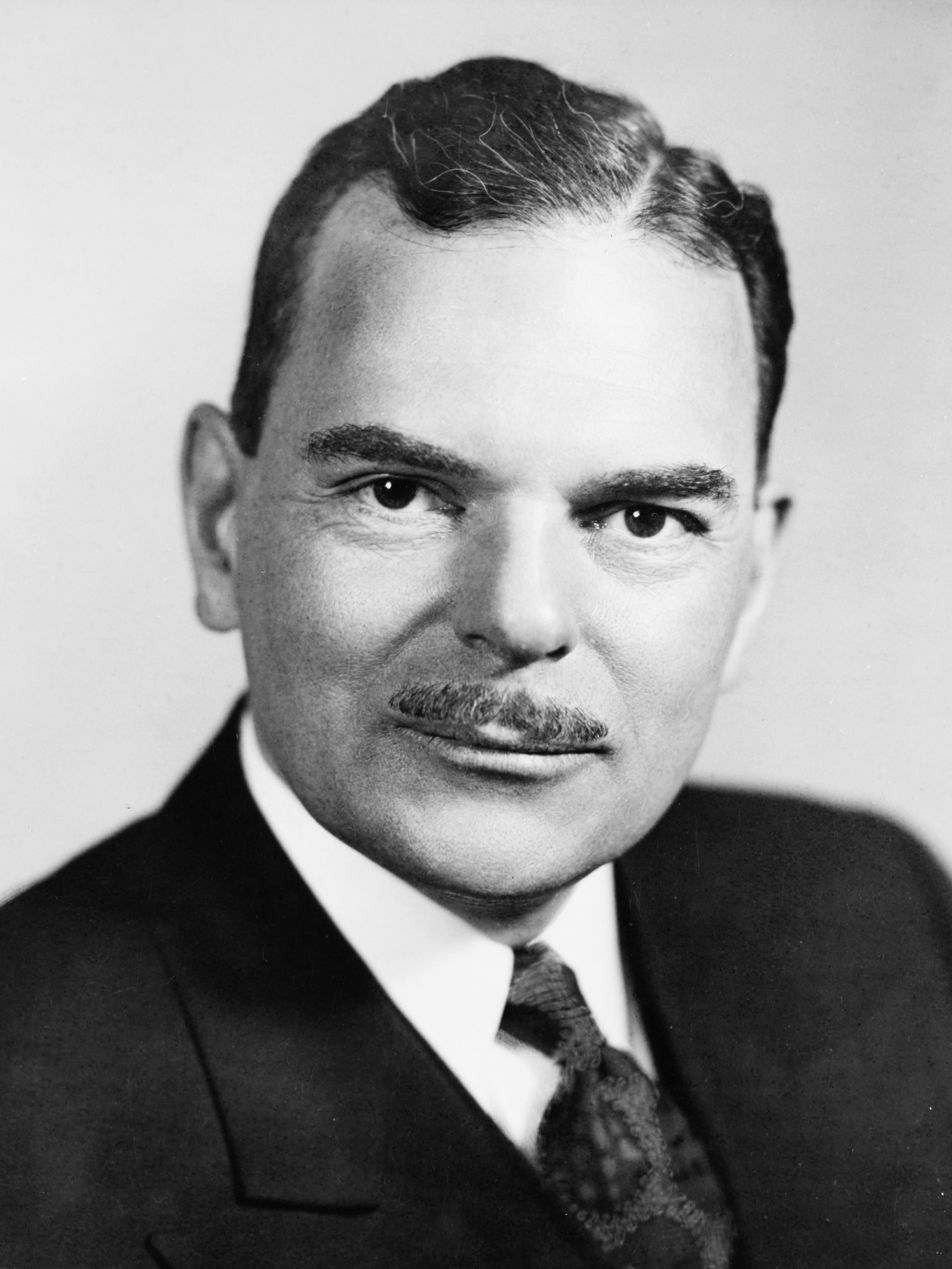

Nominee	Thomas E. Dewey	Harry S. Truman
Party	Republican	Democratic
Home state	New York	Missouri
Running mate	Earl Warren	Alben William Barkley
Electoral vote	8	0
Popular vote	437,754	423,297
Percentage	49.55%	47.91%

Dewey
40–50%
50–60%
60–70%
70–80%
80–90%
Truman
40–50%
50–60%
60–70%
President before election
Harry S. Truman
Democratic
Elected President
Harry S. Truman
Democratic

The 1948 United States presidential election in Connecticut took place on November 2, 1948, as part of the 1948 United States presidential election. State voters chose eight electors to the Electoral College, which selected the president and vice president.

Connecticut was won by Republican candidate New York governor Thomas E. Dewey over Democratic candidate, incumbent President Harry S. Truman.

Dewey won the state by a narrow margin of 1.64%.

== Results ==
1948 United States presidential election in Connecticut
Party	Candidate	Running mate	Popular vote		Electoral vote	
Party	Candidate	Running mate	Count	%	Count	%
Republican	Thomas Edmund Dewey of New York	Earl Warren of California	437,754	49.55%	8	100.00%
Democratic	Harry S. Truman of Missouri (incumbent)	Alben William Barkley of Kentucky	423,297	47.91%	0	0.00%
Progressive	Henry Agard Wallace of Iowa	Glen Hearst Taylor of Idaho	13,713	1.55%	0	0.00%
Socialist	Norman Thomas of New York	Tucker Powell Smith of Michigan	6,964	0.79%	0	0.00%
Socialist Labor	Edward A. Teichert of Pennsylvania	Stephen Emery of New York	1,184	0.13%	0	0.00%
Socialist Workers	Farrell Dobbs of Minnesota	Grace Carlson of Minnesota	606	0.07%	0	0.00%
Total			883,518	100.00%	8	100.00%

=== By county ===
County	Thomas E. Dewey Republican		Harry S. Truman Democratic		Various candidates Other parties		Margin		Total votes cast
County	#	%	#	%	#	%	#	%	Total votes cast
Fairfield	118,636	54.65%	90,767	41.81%	7,669	3.54%	27,869	12.84%	217,072
Hartford	105,262	44.74%	124,874	53.07%	5,157	2.19%	-19,612	-8.33%	235,293
Litchfield	26,848	57.99%	18,628	40.23%	823	1.78%	8,220	17.76%	46,299
Middlesex	16,119	51.56%	14,609	46.73%	537	1.71%	1,510	4.83%	31,265
New Haven	120,769	48.50%	121,591	48.83%	6,633	2.67%	-822	-0.33%	248,993
New London	27,416	47.42%	29,425	50.90%	973	1.68%	-2,009	-3.48%	57,814
Tolland	9,012	52.01%	7,970	45.99%	347	2.00%	1,042	6.02%	17,329
Windham	13,692	46.49%	15,433	52.40%	328	1.11%	-1,741	-5.91%	29,453
Totals	437,754	49.55%	423,297	47.91%	22,467	2.54%	14,457	1.64%	883,518

== See also ==
- United States presidential elections in Connecticut
