= 1940 United States presidential election in Connecticut =

- November 5, 1940
- Turnout: 90.46%

| Nominee | Franklin D. Roosevelt | Wendell Willkie |
| Party | Democratic | Republican |
| Home state | New York | New York |
| Running mate | Henry A. Wallace | Charles L. McNary |
| Electoral vote | 8 | 0 |
| Popular vote | 417,621 | 361,819 |
| Percentage | 53.44% | 46.30% |

Roosevelt
50–60%
60–70%
70–80%
Willkie
50–60%
60–70%
70–80%
80–90%
President before election
Franklin D. Roosevelt
Democratic
Elected President
Franklin D. Roosevelt
Democratic

The 1940 United States presidential election in Connecticut took place on November 5, 1940. All contemporary 48 states were part of the 1940 United States presidential election. State voters chose eight electors to the Electoral College, which selected the president and vice president.

Connecticut was won by popular incumbent Democratic President Franklin D. Roosevelt of New York, who was running against Republican businessman Wendell Willkie of New York. Roosevelt ran with Henry A. Wallace of Iowa as his running mate, and Willkie ran with Senator Charles L. McNary of Oregon.

Roosevelt won Connecticut by a comfortable margin of 7.14%, which made Connecticut 2.8% more Republican than the nation-at-large. As of 2025, this is the most recent election where Connecticut voted to the left of neighboring Massachusetts.

== Results ==
1940 United States presidential election in Connecticut
| Party | Candidate | Running mate | Popular vote | | Electoral vote | |
| Party | Candidate | Running mate | Count | % | Count | % |
|---|---|---|---|---|---|---|
| Democratic | Franklin Delano Roosevelt of New York | Henry Agard Wallace of Iowa | 417,621 | 53.44% | 8 | 100.00% |
| Republican | Wendell Willkie of New York | Charles Linza McNary of Oregon | 361,819 | 46.30% | 0 | 0.00% |
| Communist | Earl Russell Browder of Kansas | James W. Ford of New York | 1,091 | 0.14% | 0 | 0.00% |
| Socialist Labor | John W. Aiken of Connecticut | Aaron M. Orange of New York | 971 | 0.12% | 0 | 0.00% |
| Total | | | 781,502 | 100.00% | 8 | 100.00% |

=== By county ===
1940 United States presidential election in Connecticut (by county)
| County | Roosevelt % | Roosevelt # | Willkie % | Willkie # | Others % | Others # | Margin % | Margin # | Total # |
|---|---|---|---|---|---|---|---|---|---|
| Fairfield | 50.4% | 93,688 | 49.0% | 90,905 | 0.6% | 1,114 | 1.4% | 2,783 | 185,707 |
| Hartford | 56.3% | 114,336 | 43.4% | 87,982 | 0.3% | 635 | 12.9% | 26,354 | 202,953 |
| Litchfield | 45.9% | 19,537 | 53.9% | 22,936 | 0.2% | 69 | -8.0% | -3,399 | 42,542 |
| Middlesex | 49.2% | 13,044 | 50.6% | 13,436 | 0.2% | 50 | -1.4% | -392 | 26,530 |
| New Haven | 54.9% | 126,072 | 44.8% | 102,852 | 0.3% | 765 | 10.1% | 23,220 | 229,689 |
| New London | 54.6% | 28,286 | 45.1% | 23,340 | 0.3% | 147 | 9.5% | 4,946 | 51,773 |
| Tolland | 50.5% | 7,669 | 49.3% | 7,495 | 0.2% | 47 | 1.2% | 174 | 27,111 |
| Windham | 55.3% | 14,989 | 44.5% | 12,075 | 0.2% | 47 | 10.8% | 2,914 | 27,111 |

==== Counties that flipped from Democratic to Republican ====
- Middlesex

== See also ==
- United States presidential elections in Connecticut
