= 1848 United States presidential election in Connecticut =

- November 7, 1848
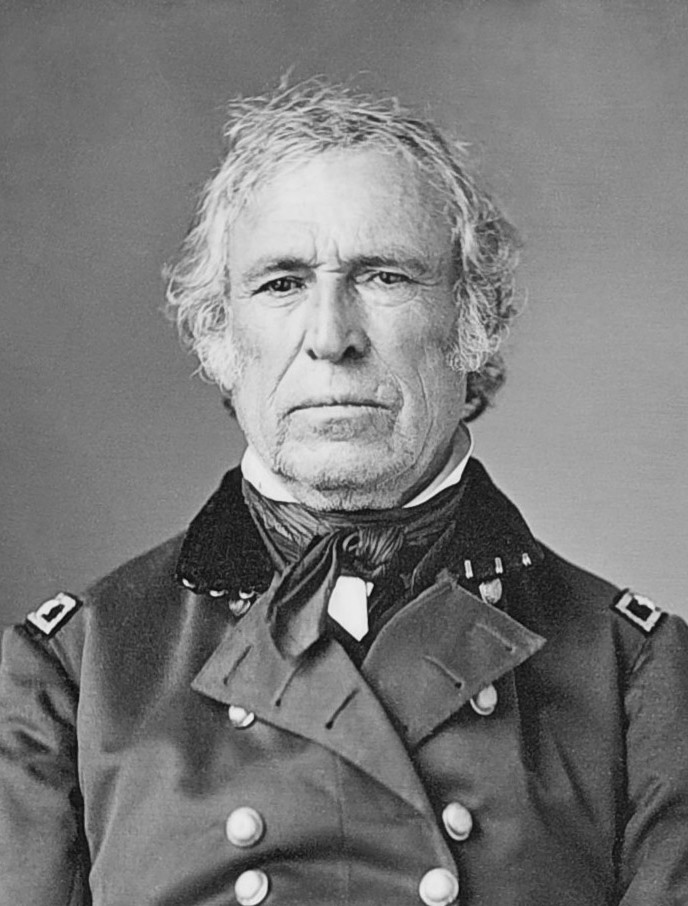

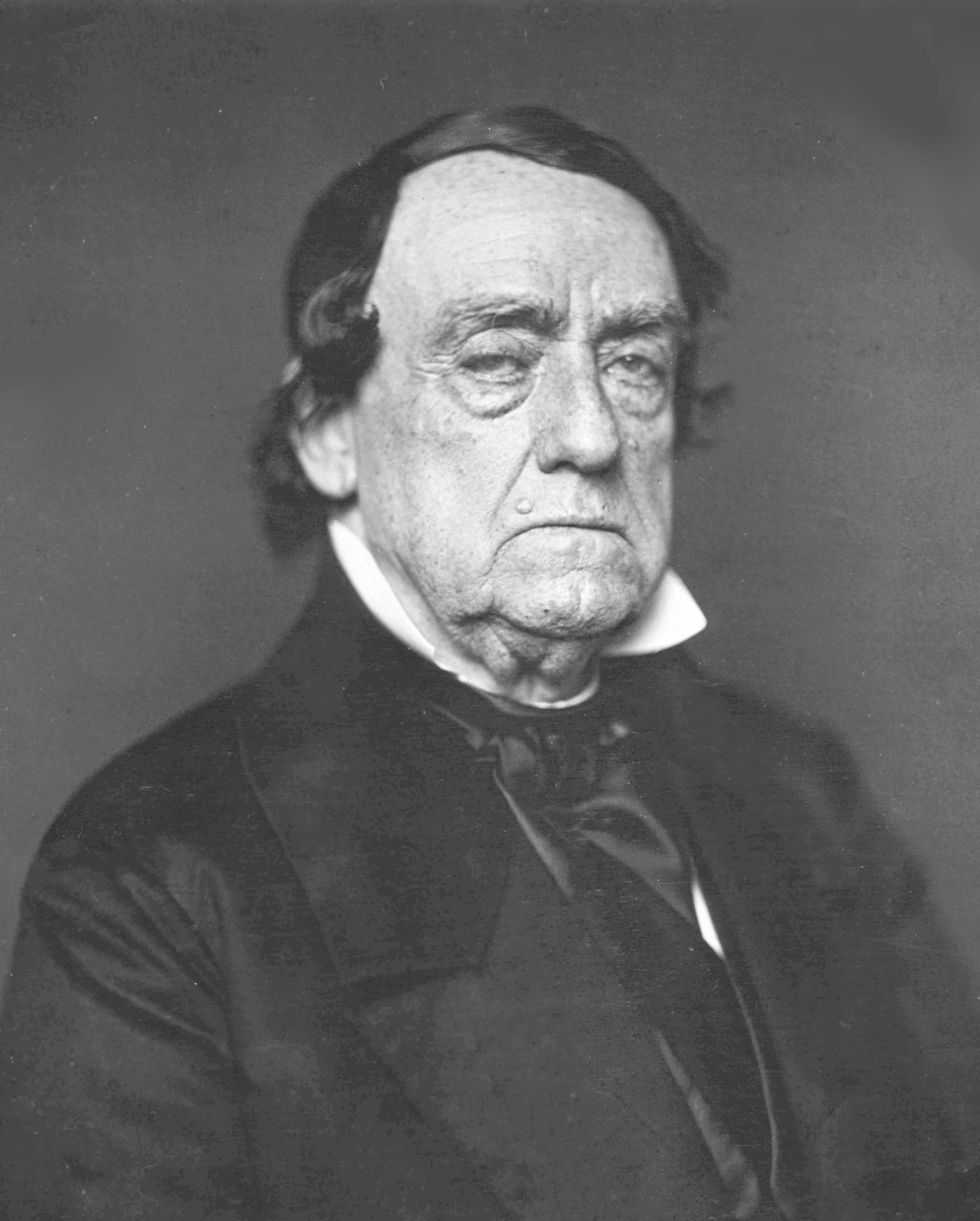

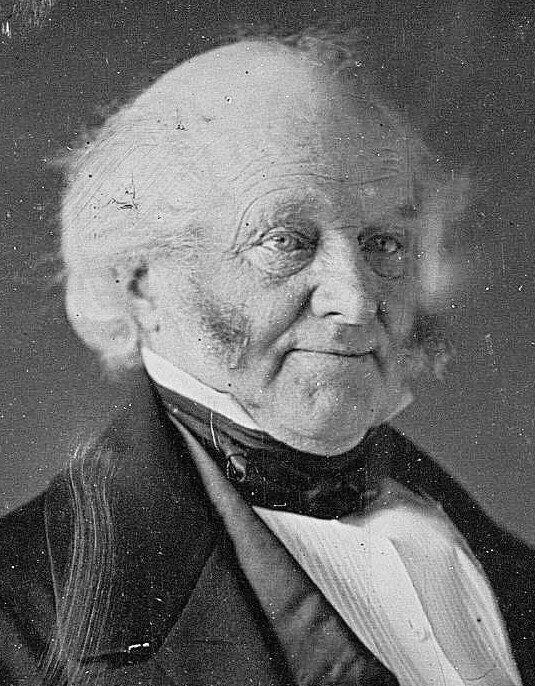
Nominee	Zachary Taylor	Lewis Cass	Martin Van Buren
Party	Whig	Democratic	Free Soil
Home state	Louisiana	Michigan	New York
Running mate	Millard Fillmore	William O. Butler	Charles Francis Adams Sr.
Electoral vote	6	0	0
Popular vote	30,318	27,051	5,005
Percentage	48.59%	43.35%	8.02%
- Taylor 40–50% 50–60% 60–70% 70–80% Cass 40–50% 50–60% 60–70% Van Buren 40–50% Tie 40–50% No Data/Vote
President before election
James K. Polk
Democratic
Elected President
Zachary Taylor
Whig

The 1848 United States presidential election in Connecticut took place on November 7, 1848, as part of the 1848 United States presidential election. Voters chose six representatives, or electors to the Electoral College, who voted for President and Vice President.

Connecticut voted for the Whig candidate, Zachary Taylor, over Democratic candidate Lewis Cass and Free Soil Party candidate Martin Van Buren. Taylor won Connecticut by a margin of 5.24%.

== Results ==
1848 United States presidential election in Connecticut
Party	Candidate	Running mate	Popular vote		Electoral vote	
Party	Candidate	Running mate	Count	%	Count	%
Whig	Zachary Taylor of Louisiana	Millard Fillmore of New York	30,318	48.59%	6	100.00%
Democratic	Lewis Cass of Michigan	William O. Butler of Kentucky	27,051	43.35%	0	0.00%
Free Soil	Martin Van Buren of New York	Charles Francis Adams Sr. of Massachusetts	5,005	8.02%	0	0.00%
–	Write-ins	–	24	0.04%	0	0.00%
Total			62,398	100.00%	6	100.00%

== See also ==
- United States presidential elections in Connecticut
