= 1840 United States presidential election in Connecticut =

- November 2, 1840
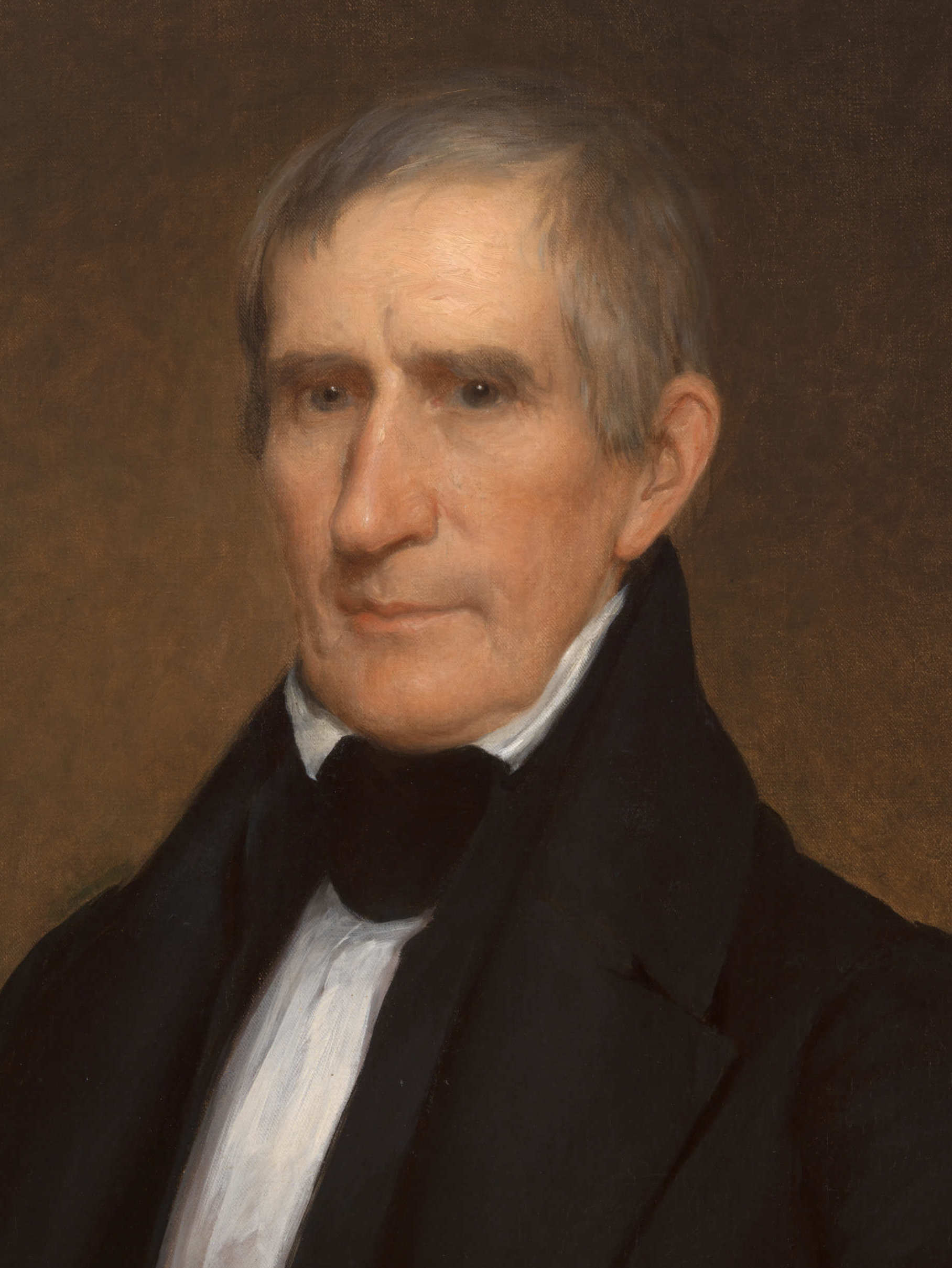

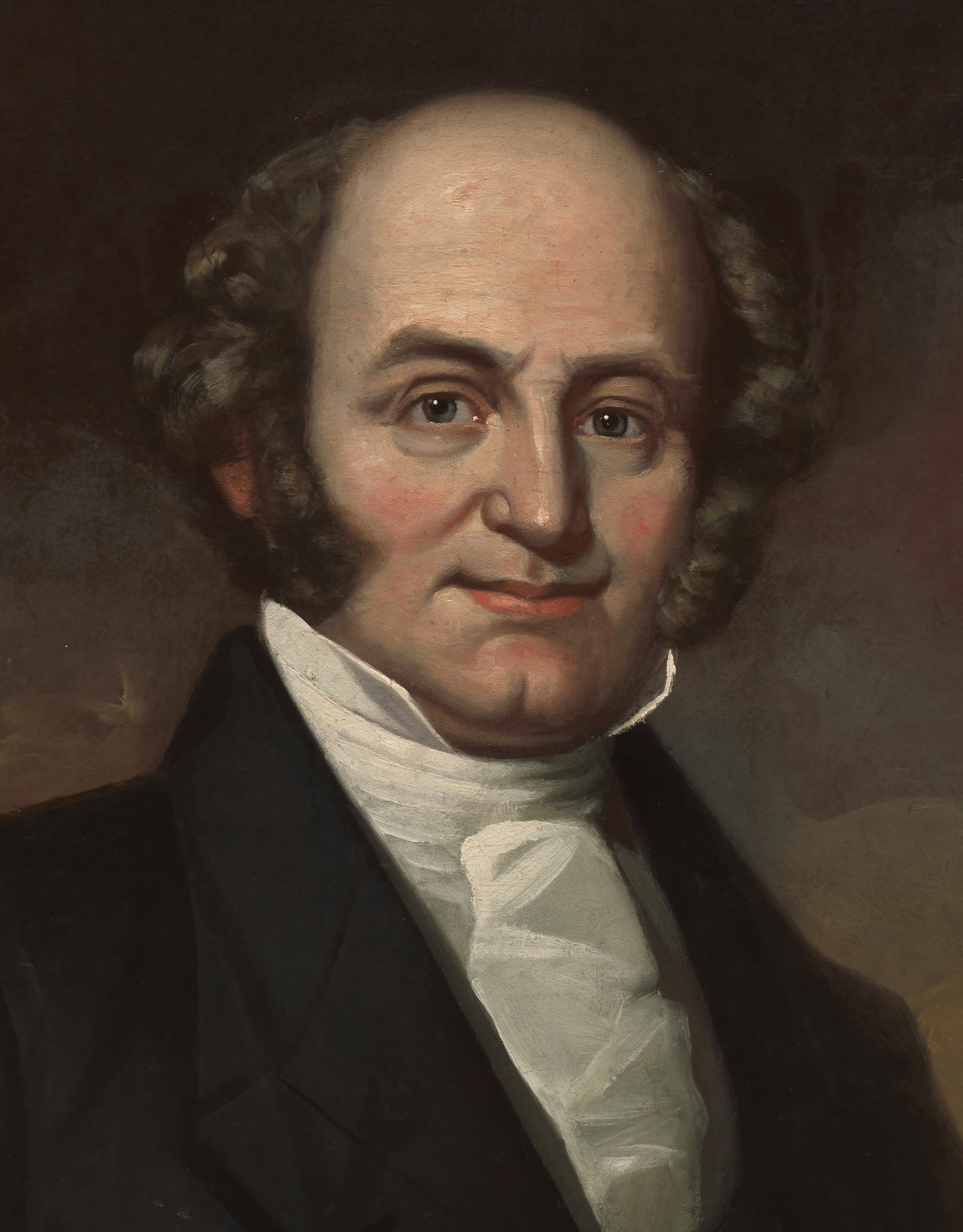
Nominee	William Henry Harrison	Martin Van Buren
Party	Whig	Democratic
Home state	Ohio	New York
Running mate	John Tyler	none
Electoral vote	8	0
Popular vote	31,598	25,281
Percentage	55.55%	44.45%

Harrison
40–50%
50–60%
60–70%
70–80%
80–90%
Van Buren
50–60%
60–70%
President before election
Martin Van Buren
Democratic
Elected President
William Henry Harrison
Whig

A presidential election was held in Connecticut on November 2, 1840 as part of the 1840 United States presidential election. Voters chose eight representatives, or electors to the Electoral College, who voted for President and Vice President.

Connecticut voted for the Whig candidate, William Henry Harrison, over Democratic candidate Martin Van Buren. Harrison won Connecticut by a margin of 11.1%.

== Results ==
1840 United States presidential election in Connecticut
Party	Candidate	Running mate	Popular vote		Electoral vote	
Party	Candidate	Running mate	Count	%	Count	%
Whig	William Henry Harrison of Ohio	John Tyler of Virginia	31,598	55.55%	8	100.00%
Democratic	Martin Van Buren of New York	Richard Mentor Johnson of Kentucky	25,281	44.45%	0	0.00%
Total			56,879	100.00%	8	100.00%

== See also ==
- United States presidential elections in Connecticut
