= 1992 United States presidential election in Connecticut =

- November 3, 1992
- Turnout: 83.9%

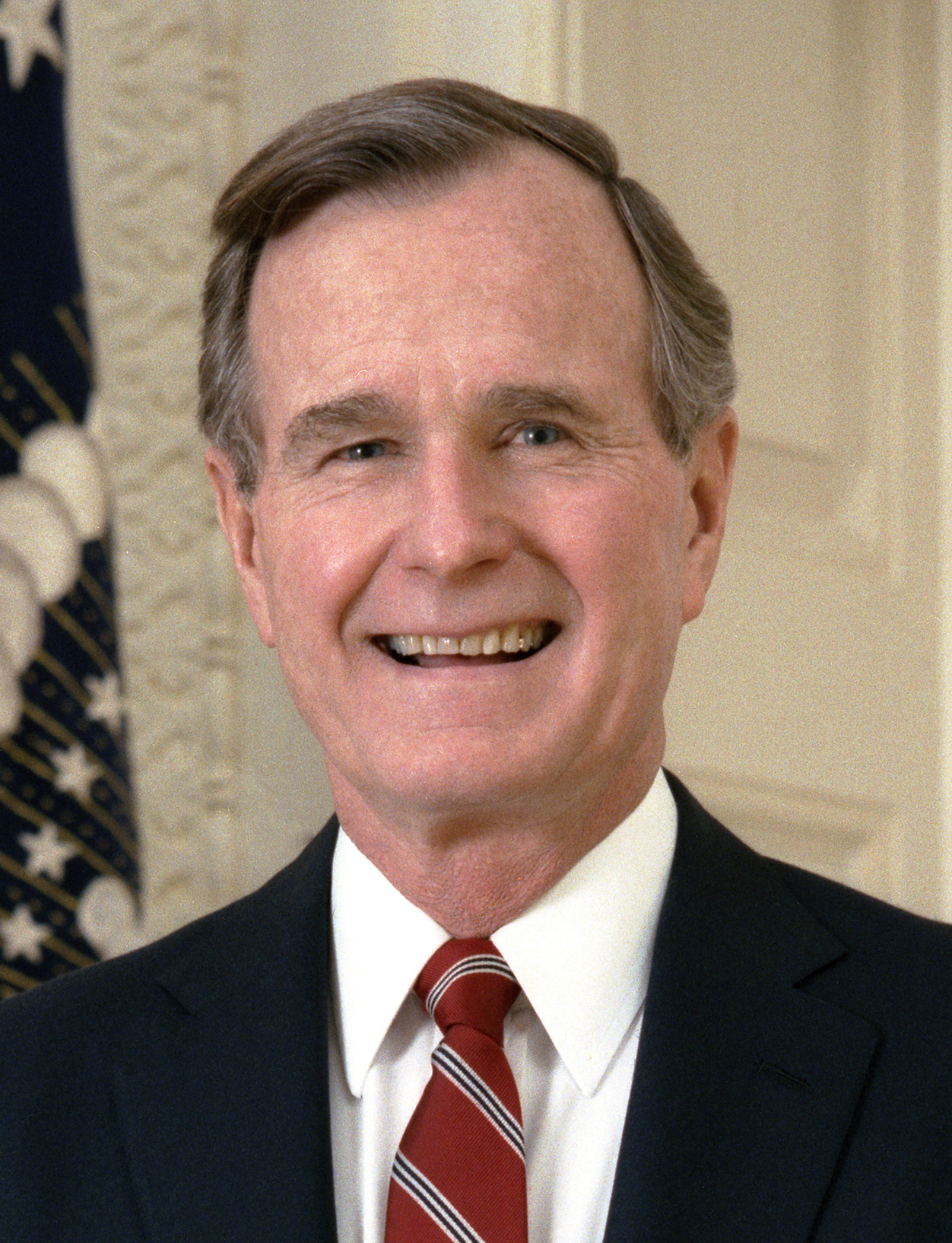

Nominee	Bill Clinton	George H. W. Bush	Ross Perot
Party	Democratic	Republican	Americans for Perot
Alliance			Independent
Home state	Arkansas	Texas	Texas
Running mate	Al Gore	Dan Quayle	James Stockdale
Electoral vote	8	0	0
Popular vote	682,318	578,313	348,771
Percentage	42.21%	35.78%	21.58%

Clinton
30–40%
40–50%
50–60%
60–70%
70–80%
Bush
30–40%
40–50%
50–60%
Perot
30–40%
Tie
30–40%
President before election
George H. W. Bush
Republican
Elected President
Bill Clinton
Democratic

The 1992 United States presidential election in Connecticut took place on November 3, 1992, as part of the 1992 United States presidential election. Voters chose eight representatives, or electors, to the Electoral College, who voted for president and vice president.

Connecticut was won by Governor Bill Clinton (D-Arkansas) with 42.21% of the popular vote over incumbent President George H. W. Bush (R-Texas) with 35.78%. Businessman Ross Perot (I-Texas) finished in third, with 21.58% of the popular vote. Clinton won Connecticut by a margin of 6.43%, marking the first time the state voted for a Democratic presidential nominee since 1968. This would be the last time Connecticut was regarded as a swing state, as it has voted Democratic by double digits in every election since. Clinton ultimately won the national vote, defeating incumbent President Bush. As of the 2024 presidential election, this is the last election in which Fairfield County voted for the Republican candidate. To date, this is the last time that the cities of Danbury and Milford, as well as the towns of Fairfield, Old Saybrook, Stratford, and Weston, voted Republican.

== Results ==
1992 United States presidential election in Connecticut
Party	Candidate	Votes	Percentage	Electoral votes
Democratic	Bill Clinton	682,318	42.21%	8
Republican	George H. W. Bush (incumbent)	578,313	35.78%	0
Americans for Perot	Ross Perot	348,771	21.58%	0
Libertarian	Andre Marrou	5,391	0.33%	0
New Alliance	Lenora Fulani	1,363	0.08%	0
N/A	Other	176	0.01%	0
Totals		1,616,332	100.0%	8
Voter turnout (voting age/registered)				64%/82%

=== By county ===
County	Bill Clinton Democratic		George H.W. Bush Republican		Various candidates Other parties		Margin		Total votes cast
County	#	%	#	%	#	%	#	%	Total votes cast
Fairfield	160,202	39.13%	175,158	42.78%	74,050	18.09%	-14,956	-3.65%	409,410
Hartford	195,495	47.13%	132,591	31.96%	86,718	20.91%	62,904	15.17%	414,804
Litchfield	33,686	36.14%	34,492	37.00%	25,035	26.86%	-806	-0.86%	93,213
Middlesex	34,707	42.83%	24,646	30.42%	21,674	26.75%	10,061	12.41%	81,027
New Haven	161,374	41.90%	141,264	36.68%	82,494	21.42%	20,110	5.22%	385,132
New London	49,808	42.29%	34,567	29.35%	33,392	28.36%	15,241	12.94%	117,767
Tolland	27,425	41.42%	20,632	31.16%	18,158	27.42%	6,793	10.26%	66,215
Windham	19,621	40.38%	14,963	30.80%	14,004	28.82%	4,658	9.58%	48,588
Totals	682,318	42.21%	578,313	35.78%	355,701	22.01%	104,005	6.43%	1,616,332

==== Counties that flipped from Republican to Democratic ====
- Middlesex
- New Haven
- New London
- Tolland
- Windham

=== By congressional district ===
Clinton won four of six congressional districts, including one that elected a Republican.

District	Bush	Clinton	Perot	Representative
1st	31%	50%	19%	Barbara Kennelly
2nd	30%	43%	27%	Sam Gejdenson
3rd	35%	44%	20%	Rosa DeLauro
4th	42.2%	41.8%	16%	Chris Shays
5th	42%	35%	23%	Gary Franks
6th	36%	40%	24%	Nancy Johnson

== See also ==
- United States presidential elections in Connecticut
- Presidency of Bill Clinton
