= United States presidential elections in Connecticut =

Presidential elections in Connecticut
- Number of elections: 60
- Voted Democratic: 22
- Voted Republican: 23
- Voted Whig: 3
- Voted Democratic-Republican: 4
- Voted Federalist: 6
- Voted other: 2 (Note: George Washington, 1788–89, 1792)
- Voted for winning candidate: 40
- Voted for losing candidate: 20

Connecticut is a state in the New England region of the United States. One of the original Thirteen Colonies, Connecticut has participated in all sixty U.S. presidential elections since the American Revolution. In the early days of the United States, Connecticut was known for supporting the conservative Federalist Party. In the Second Party System, Connecticut leaned towards the anti-Jackson candidates. Following the Civil War, Connecticut was a swing state for a long time until 1896. Thereafter until 1932, Connecticut was a Republican stronghold. During this period, Connecticut Republican Party chairman J. Henry Roraback built up a political machine which was "efficient, conservative, penurious, and in absolute control".

During the Great Depression, Connecticut began to pivot in support of Democratic candidates. After that, although the Republican Party won Connecticut several times in the presidential election, its advantage was no longer as significant as it had previously been. Since 1992, the state has voted consistently for the Democratic candidates.

In 2020, Joe Biden became the first candidate in Connecticut history to win over one million votes in the state, scoring nearly 1.1 million votes.

Connecticut is a signatory of the National Popular Vote Interstate Compact, an interstate compact in which signatories award all of their electoral votes to the winner of the national-level popular vote in a presidential election, even if another candidate won an individual signatory's popular vote. As of 2023, it has not yet gone into force.

== Presidential elections ==
Key for parties
American Independent Party – (AI)
Anti-Masonic Party – (Anti-M)
Communist Party USA – (CPUSA)
Constitutional Union Party – (CU)
Democratic Party – (D)
Democratic-Republican Party – (DR)
Free Soil Party – (FS)
Federalist Party – (F)
Green Party – (G)
Greenback Party – (GB)
Independent candidate – (I)
Know Nothing Party – (KN)
Liberal Republican Party – (LR)
Libertarian Party – (LI)
National Democratic Party – (ND)
National Republican Party – (NP)
National Union Party – (NU)
Progressive Party (1912) – (PR-1912)
Progressive Party (1924) – (PR-1924)
Progressive Party (1948) – (PR-1948)
Prohibition Party – (PRO)
Reform Party – (RE)
Republican Party – (R)
Socialist Party of America – (S)
Southern Democratic Party – (SD)
Whig Party – (W)
Union Party – (U)
Note – A double dagger (‡) indicates the national winner.

=== 1788–89 to 1820 ===
As a part of New England, Connecticut was the stronghold of the Federalist Party. It voted for Federalist candidates in presidential elections from 1796 to 1816. Before 1820, its electors were appointed by state legislature.

Presidential elections in Connecticut from 1788–89 to 1820
Year	Winner			Runner-up			EV	Ref.
Year	Candidate	Votes	%	Candidate	Votes	%	EV	Ref.
1788–89	George Washington (I)‡	–	–	–	–	–	7	(Note: Electors were appointed by state legislature.) (Note: Ran unopposed)
1792	George Washington (I)‡	–	–	–	–	–	9	
1796	John Adams (F)‡	–	–	Thomas Jefferson (DR)	–	–	9	
1800	John Adams (F)	–	–	Thomas Jefferson (DR)‡	–	–	9	
1804	Charles C. Pinckney (F)	–	–	Thomas Jefferson (DR)‡	–	–	9	
1808	Charles C. Pinckney (F)	–	–	James Madison (DR)‡	–	–	9	
1812	DeWitt Clinton (F)	–	–	James Madison (DR)‡	–	–	9	
1816	Rufus King (F)	–	–	James Monroe (DR)‡	–	–	9	
1820	James Monroe (DR)‡	3,871	84.17%	Unpledged electors (F)	728	15.83%	9	

=== 1824 ===
The election of 1824 was a complex realigning election following the collapse of the prevailing Democratic-Republican Party, resulting in four different candidates each claiming to carry the banner of the party, and competing for influence in different parts of the country. The election was the only one in history to be decided by the House of Representatives under the provisions of the Twelfth Amendment to the United States Constitution after no candidate secured a majority of the electoral vote. It was also the only presidential election in which the candidate who received a plurality of electoral votes (Andrew Jackson) did not become president, a source of great bitterness for Jackson and his supporters, who proclaimed the election of Adams a corrupt bargain.

1860 Presidential election in Connecticut
Year	Winner		Runner-up		Runner-up		Runner-up		EV	Ref.
Year	Candidate	Votes (%)	Candidate	Votes (%)	Candidate	Votes (%)	Candidate	Votes (%)	EV	Ref.
1824	John Quincy Adams (DR)‡	7,494 (70.39%)	William H. Crawford (DR)	1,965 (18.46%)	Andrew Jackson (DR)	– (Note: Not on ballot)	Henry Clay (DR)	–	8	

=== 1828 to 1856 ===
Presidential elections in Connecticut from 1828 to 1856
Year	Winner			Runner-up			Other candidate (Note: For purposes of these lists, other national candidates are defined as those who won at least one electoral vote, or won at least ten percent of the vote in multiple states.)			EV	Ref.
Year	Candidate	Votes	%	Candidate	Votes	%	Candidate	Votes	%	EV	Ref.
1828	John Quincy Adams (NR)	13,829	71.36%	Andrew Jackson (D)‡	4,448	22.95%	–	–	–	8	
1832	Henry Clay (NR)	18,155	55.29%	Andrew Jackson (D)‡	11,269	34.32%	William Wirt (Anti-M)	3,409	10.38%	8	
1836	Martin Van Buren (D)‡	19,294	50.65%	William Henry Harrison (W)	18,799	49.35%	–	–	–	8	
1840	William Henry Harrison (W)‡	31,598	55.55%	Martin Van Buren (D)	25,281	44.45%	–	–	–	8	
1844	Henry Clay (W)	32,832	50.81%	James K. Polk (D)‡	29,831	46.17%	–	–	–	6	
1848	Zachary Taylor (W)‡	30,318	48.59%	Lewis Cass (D)	27,051	43.35%	Martin Van Buren (FS)	5,005	8.02%	6	
1852	Franklin Pierce (D)‡	33,249	49.79%	Winfield Scott (W)	30,359	45.46%	John P. Hale (FS)	3,161	4.73%	6	
1856	John C. Frémont (R)	42,717	53.18%	James Buchanan (D)‡	34,997	43.57%	Millard Fillmore (KN)	2,615	3.26%	6	

=== 1860 ===
The election of 1860 was a complex realigning election in which the breakdown of the previous two-party alignment culminated in four parties each competing for influence in different parts of the country. The result of the election, with the victory of an ardent opponent of slavery, spurred the secession of eleven states and brought about the American Civil War.

1860 Presidential election in Connecticut
Year	Winner		Runner-up		Runner-up		Runner-up		EV	Ref.
Year	Candidate	Votes (%)	Candidate	Votes (%)	Candidate	Votes (%)	Candidate	Votes (%)	EV	Ref.
1860	Abraham Lincoln (R)‡	43,486 (53.86%)	Stephen A. Douglas (D)	17,364 (21.5%)	John C. Breckinridge (SD)	16,558 (20.51%)	John Bell (CU)	3,337 (4.13%)	6	

=== 1864 to present ===
Presidential elections in Connecticut from 1864 to present
Year	Winner			Runner-up			Other candidate (Note: For purposes of these lists, other candidates are defined as those who were in third place in Connecticut.)			EV	Ref.
Year	Candidate	Votes	%	Candidate	Votes	%	Candidate	Votes	%	EV	Ref.
1864	Abraham Lincoln (NU)‡	44,693	51.38%	George B. McClellan (D)	42,288	48.62%	–	–	–	6	
1868	Ulysses S. Grant (R)‡	50,788	51.49%	Horatio Seymour (D)	47,844	48.51%	–	–	–	6	
1872	Ulysses S. Grant (R)‡	50,314	52.41%	Horace Greeley (LR)	45,695	47.59%	–	–	–	6	
1876	Samuel J. Tilden (D)	61,927	50.7%	Rutherford B. Hayes (R)‡	59,033	48.33%	Peter Cooper (GB)	774	0.63%	6	
1880	James A. Garfield (R)‡	67,071	50.51%	Winfield S. Hancock (D)	64,411	48.5%	James B. Weaver (GB)	868	0.65%	6	
1884	Grover Cleveland (D)‡	67,182	48.95%	James G. Blaine (R)	65,898	48.01%	John St. John (PRO)	2,493	1.82%	6	
1888	Grover Cleveland (D)	74,920	48.66%	Benjamin Harrison (R)‡	74,584	48.44%	Clinton Fisk (PRO)	4,234	2.75%	6	
1892	Grover Cleveland (D)‡	82,395	50.06%	Benjamin Harrison (R)	77,032	46.8%	John Bidwell (PRO)	4,026	2.45%	6	
1896	William McKinley (R)‡	110,285	63.24%	William Jennings Bryan (D)	56,740	32.54%	John McAuley Palmer (ND)	4,336	2.49%	6	
1900	William McKinley (R)‡	102,572	56.92%	William Jennings Bryan (D)	74,014	41.07%	John G. Woolley (PRO)	1,617	0.9%	6	
1904	Theodore Roosevelt (R)‡	111,089	58.12%	Alton B. Parker (D)	72,909	38.15%	Eugene V. Debs (S)	4,543	2.38%	7	
1908	William Howard Taft (R)‡	112,915	59.43%	William Jennings Bryan (D)	68,255	35.92%	Eugene V. Debs (S)	5,113	2.69%	7	
1912	Woodrow Wilson (D)‡	74,561	39.16%	William Howard Taft (R)	68,324	35.88%	Theodore Roosevelt (PR-1912)	34,129	17.92%	7	
1916	Charles Evans Hughes (R)	106,514	49.8%	Woodrow Wilson (D)‡	99,786	46.66%	Allan L. Benson (S)	5,179	2.42%	7	
1920	Warren G. Harding (R)‡	229,238	62.72%	James M. Cox (D)	120,721	33.03%	Eugene V. Debs (S)	10,350	2.83%	7	
1924	Calvin Coolidge (R)‡	246,322	61.54%	John W. Davis (D)	110,184	27.53%	Robert M. La Follette (PR-1924)	42,416	10.6%	7	
1928	Herbert Hoover (R)‡	296,641	53.63%	Al Smith (D)	252,085	45.57%	Norman Thomas (S)	3,029	0.55%	7	
1932	Herbert Hoover (R)	288,420	48.54%	Franklin D. Roosevelt (D)‡	281,632	47.4%	Norman Thomas (S)	20,480	3.45%	8	
1936	Franklin D. Roosevelt (D)‡	382,129	55.32%	Alf Landon (R)	278,685	40.35%	William Lemke (U)	21,805	3.16%	8	
1940	Franklin D. Roosevelt (D)‡	417,621	53.44%	Wendell Willkie (R)	361,819	46.3%	Earl Browder (CPUSA)	1,091	0.14%	8	
1944	Franklin D. Roosevelt (D)‡	435,146	52.3%	Thomas E. Dewey (R)	390,527	46.94%	Norman Thomas (S)	5,097	0.61%	8	
1948	Thomas E. Dewey (R)	437,754	49.55%	Harry S. Truman (D)‡	423,297	47.91%	Henry A. Wallace (PR-1948)	13,713	1.55%	8	
1952	Dwight D. Eisenhower (R)‡	611,012	55.7%	Adlai Stevenson II (D)	481,649	43.91%	Darlington Hoopes (S)	2,244	0.2%	8	
1956	Dwight D. Eisenhower (R)‡	711,837	63.72%	Adlai Stevenson II (D)	405,079	36.26%	Others	205	0.02%	8	
1960	John F. Kennedy (D)‡	657,055	53.73%	Richard Nixon (R)	565,813	46.27%	Write-ins	15	0%	8	
1964	Lyndon B. Johnson (D)‡	826,269	67.81%	Barry Goldwater (R)	390,996	32.09%	Write-ins	1,313	0.11%	8	
1968	Hubert Humphrey (D)	621,561	49.48%	Richard Nixon (R)‡	556,721	44.32%	George Wallace (AI)	76,650	6.1%	8	
1972	Richard Nixon (R)‡	810,763	58.57%	George McGovern (D)	555,498	40.13%	John G. Schmitz (AI)	17,239	1.25%	8	
1976	Gerald Ford (R)	719,261	52.09%	Jimmy Carter (D)‡	647,895	46.92%	Lester Maddox (AI)	7,101	0.51%	8	
1980	Ronald Reagan (R)‡	677,210	48.16%	Jimmy Carter (D)	541,732	38.52%	John B. Anderson (I)	171,807	12.22%	8	
1984	Ronald Reagan (R)‡	890,877	60.73%	Walter Mondale (D)	569,597	38.83%	Gus Hall (CPUSA)	4,826	0.33%	8	
1988	George H. W. Bush (R)‡	750,241	51.98%	Michael Dukakis (D)	676,584	46.87%	Ron Paul (LI)	14,071	0.97%	8	
1992	Bill Clinton (D)‡	682,318	42.21%	George H. W. Bush (R)	578,313	35.78%	Ross Perot (I)	348,771	21.58%	8	
1996	Bill Clinton (D)‡	735,740	52.83%	Bob Dole (R)	483,109	34.69%	Ross Perot (RE)	139,523	10.02%	8	
2000	Al Gore (D)	816,015	55.91%	George W. Bush (R)‡	561,094	38.44%	Ralph Nader (G)	64,452	4.42%	8	
2004	John Kerry (D)	857,488	54.31%	George W. Bush (R)‡	693,826	43.95%	Ralph Nader (I)	12,969	0.82%	7	
2008	Barack Obama (D)‡	997,773	60.59%	John McCain (R)	629,428	38.22%	Ralph Nader (I)	19162	1.16%	7	
2012	Barack Obama (D)‡	905,083	58.06%	Mitt Romney (R)	634,892	40.73%	Gary Johnson (LI)	12,580	0.81%	7	
2016	Hillary Clinton (D)	897,572	54.57%	Donald Trump (R)‡	673,215	40.93%	Gary Johnson (LI)	48,676	2.96%	7	
2020	Joe Biden (D)‡	1,080,831	59.25%	Donald Trump (R)	715,291	39.21%	Jo Jorgensen (LI)	20,227	1.11%	7	
2024	Kamala Harris (D)	992,053	56.4%	Donald Trump (R)‡	736,918	41.89%	Jill Stein (G)	14,281	0.81%	7	

== Works cited ==
- Guide to U.S. Elections. SAGE Publications. 2010. ISBN 978-1-60426-536-1. LCCN 2009033938. OL 24461757M.
- Burnham, Walter Dean (1955). Presidential Ballots, 1836–1892. Johns Hopkins University Press. LCCN 55008428. OL 6176796M.
- Presidential Elections, 1789–1996. Congressional Quarterly. 1997. ISBN 978-1-56802-065-5. LCCN 97019084. OL 673017M.
