= 1944 United States presidential election in Connecticut =

- November 7, 1944
- Turnout: 86.83% ▼

Nominee	Franklin D. Roosevelt	Thomas E. Dewey
Party	Democratic	Republican
Home state	New York	New York
Running mate	Harry S. Truman	John W. Bricker
Electoral vote	8	0
Popular vote	435,146	390,527
Percentage	52.30%	46.94%

Roosevelt
50–60%
60–70%
Dewey
50–60%
60–70%
70–80%
President before election
Franklin D. Roosevelt
Democratic
Elected President
Franklin D. Roosevelt
Democratic

The 1944 United States presidential election in Connecticut took place on November 7, 1944, as part of the 1944 United States presidential election. State voters chose eight electors to the Electoral College, which selected the president and vice president.

Incumbent Democratic President Franklin D. Roosevelt won the state over New York governor Thomas E. Dewey by a margin of 5.36%.

This is the most recent election in which a candidate won Connecticut without carrying Middlesex County.

== Results ==
1944 United States presidential election in Connecticut
Party	Candidate	Running mate	Popular vote		Electoral vote	
Party	Candidate	Running mate	Count	%	Count	%
Democratic	Franklin Delano Roosevelt of New York	Harry S. Truman of Missouri	435,146	52.30%	8	100.00%
Republican	Thomas Edmund Dewey of New York	John William Bricker of Ohio	390,527	46.94%	0	0.00%
Socialist	Norman Thomas of New York	Darlington Hoopes of Pennsylvania	5,097	0.61%	0	0.00%
Socialist Labor	Edward A. Teichert of Pennsylvania	Arla Arbaugh of Ohio	1,220	0.15%	0	0.00%
Total			831,990	100.00%	8	100.00%

=== By county ===
1944 United States presidential election in Connecticut (by county)
County	Roosevelt %	Roosevelt #	Dewey %	Dewey #	Others %	Others #	Total #
Fairfield	48.3%	99,181	50.5%	103,693	1.2%	2,423	205,297
Hartford	57.0%	127,841	42.5%	95,224	0.5%	1,153	224,218
Litchfield	44.2%	19,212	55.2%	24,019	0.6%	248	43,479
Middlesex	48.3%	13,551	51.0%	14,315	0.6%	176	28,042
New Haven	52.7%	123,450	46.5%	108,883	0.8%	1,811	234,144
New London	54.5%	29,304	44.9%	24,153	0.5%	285	53,742
Tolland	48.1%	7,721	51.2%	8,208	0.7%	117	16,046
Windham	55.1%	14,886	44.5%	12,032	0.4%	104	27,022

==== Counties that flipped from Democratic to Republican ====
- Fairfield
- Tolland

== See also ==
- United States presidential elections in Connecticut
