= 1836 United States presidential election in Connecticut =

- November 7, 1836
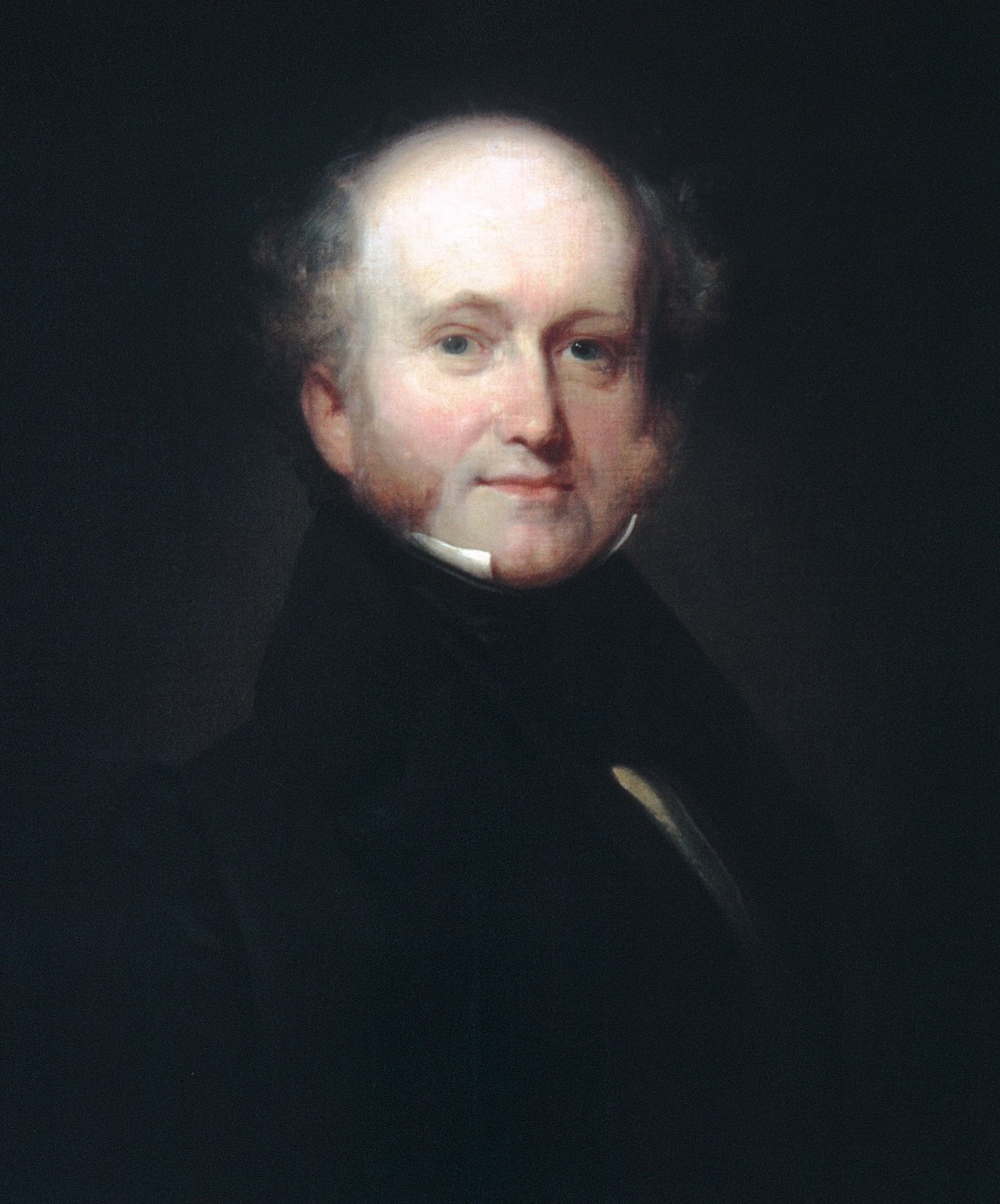

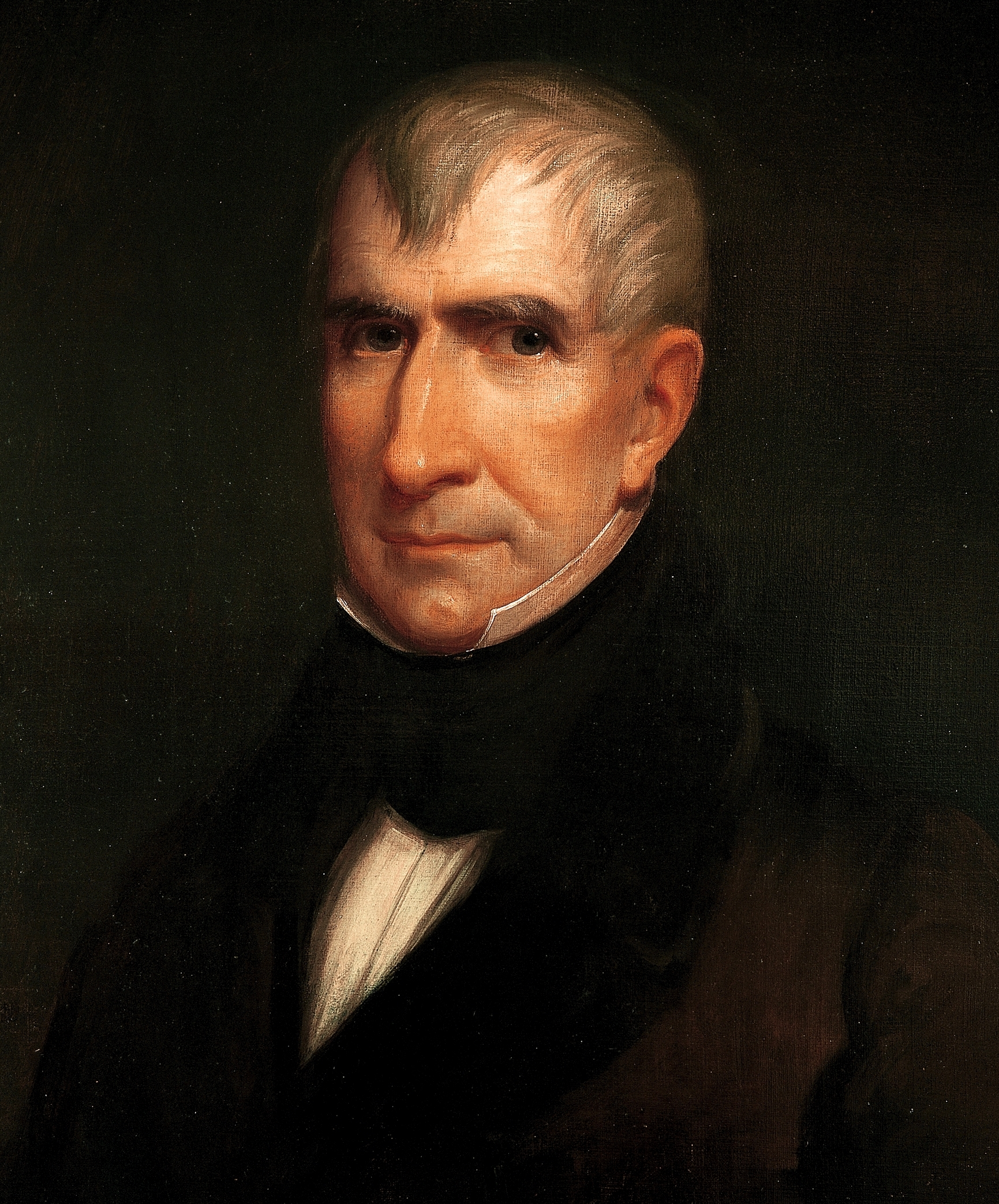
Nominee	Martin Van Buren	William Henry Harrison
Party	Democratic	Whig
Home state	New York	Ohio
Running mate	Richard Mentor Johnson	Francis Granger
Electoral vote	8	0
Popular vote	19,294	18,799
Percentage	50.65%	49.35%

Van Buren
50–60%
60–70%
70–80%
Harrison
50–60%
60–70%
70–80%
80–90%
90–100%
Tie
50%

A presidential election was held in Connecticut on November 7, 1836 as part of the 1836 United States presidential election. Voters chose eight representatives, or electors to the Electoral College, who voted for President and Vice President.

Connecticut voted for the Democratic candidate, Martin Van Buren, over Whig candidate William Henry Harrison. Van Buren won Connecticut by a narrow margin of 1.3%.

As a result of his win, Van Buren also became the first Democratic presidential candidate to carry Connecticut.

== Results ==
1836 United States presidential election in Connecticut
Party	Candidate	Votes	Percentage	Electoral votes
Democratic	Martin Van Buren	19,294	50.65%	8
Whig	William Henry Harrison	18,799	49.35%	0
Totals		38,093	100.0%	8

== See also ==
- United States presidential elections in Connecticut
