= 1812 United States presidential election in Connecticut =

- October 30 – December 2, 1812
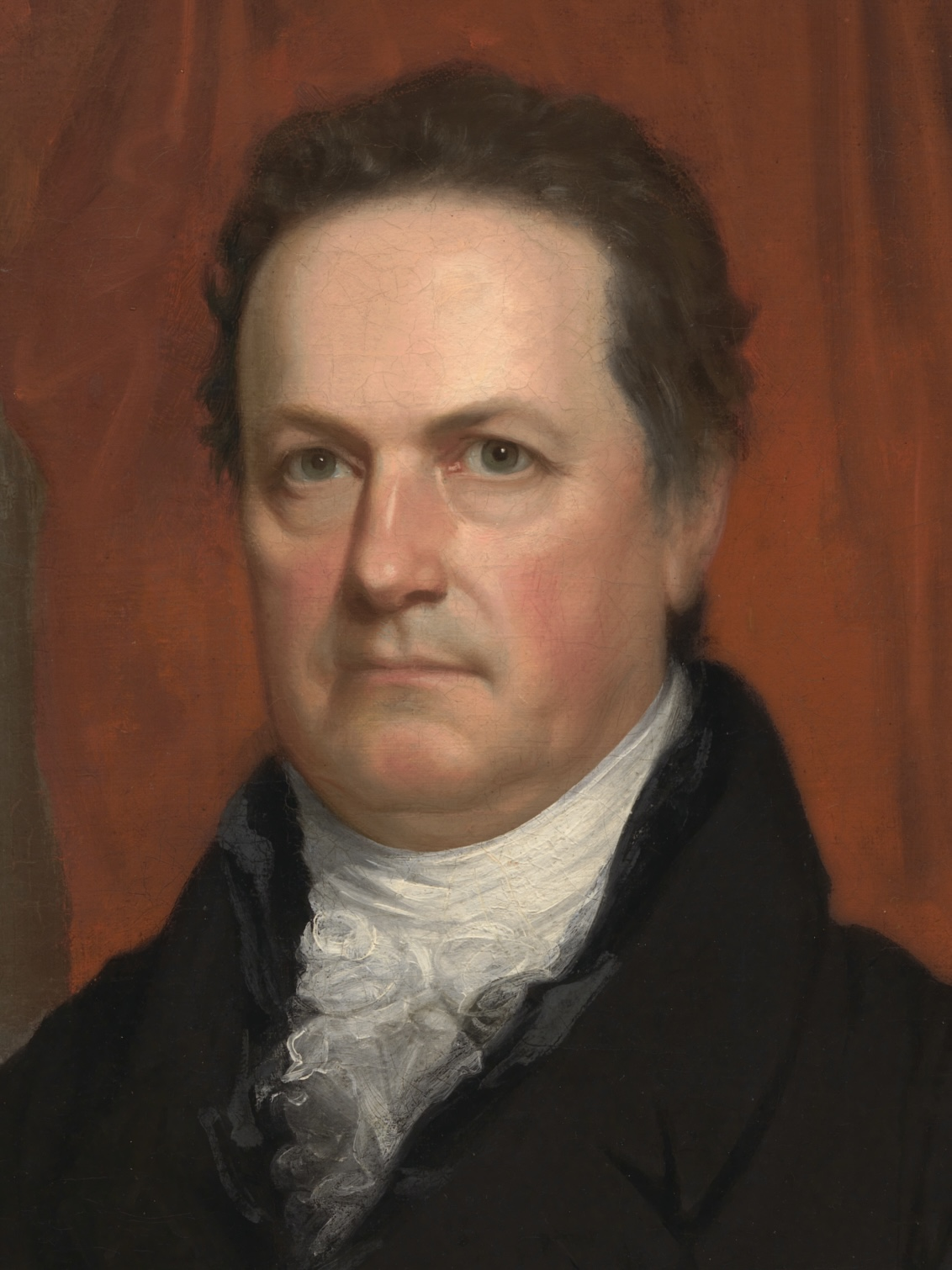
Nominee	DeWitt Clinton
Party	Democratic-Republican (Note: While commonly labeled as the Federalist candidate, Clinton technically ran as a Democratic-Republican and was not nominated by the Federalist party itself, the latter simply deciding not to field a candidate. This did not prevent endorsements from state Federalist parties (such as in Pennsylvania), but he received the endorsement from the New York state Democratic-Republicans as well.)
Alliance	Federalist
Home state	New York
Running mate	Jared Ingersoll
Electoral vote	9
Percentage	100%
President before election
James Madison
Democratic-Republican
Elected President
James Madison
Democratic-Republican

The 1812 United States presidential election in Connecticut took place between October 30 and December 2, 1812, as part of the 1812 United States presidential election. The state legislature chose nine representatives, or electors to the Electoral College, who voted for President and Vice President.

During this election, Connecticut cast its nine electoral votes to Independent Democratic-Republican and Federalist-supported candidate DeWitt Clinton. Nationally, traditional Democratic Republican candidate and incumbent President James Madison won by a narrow margin.

== See also ==
- United States presidential elections in Connecticut
