= 1824 United States presidential election in Connecticut =

- October 26 – December 2, 1824
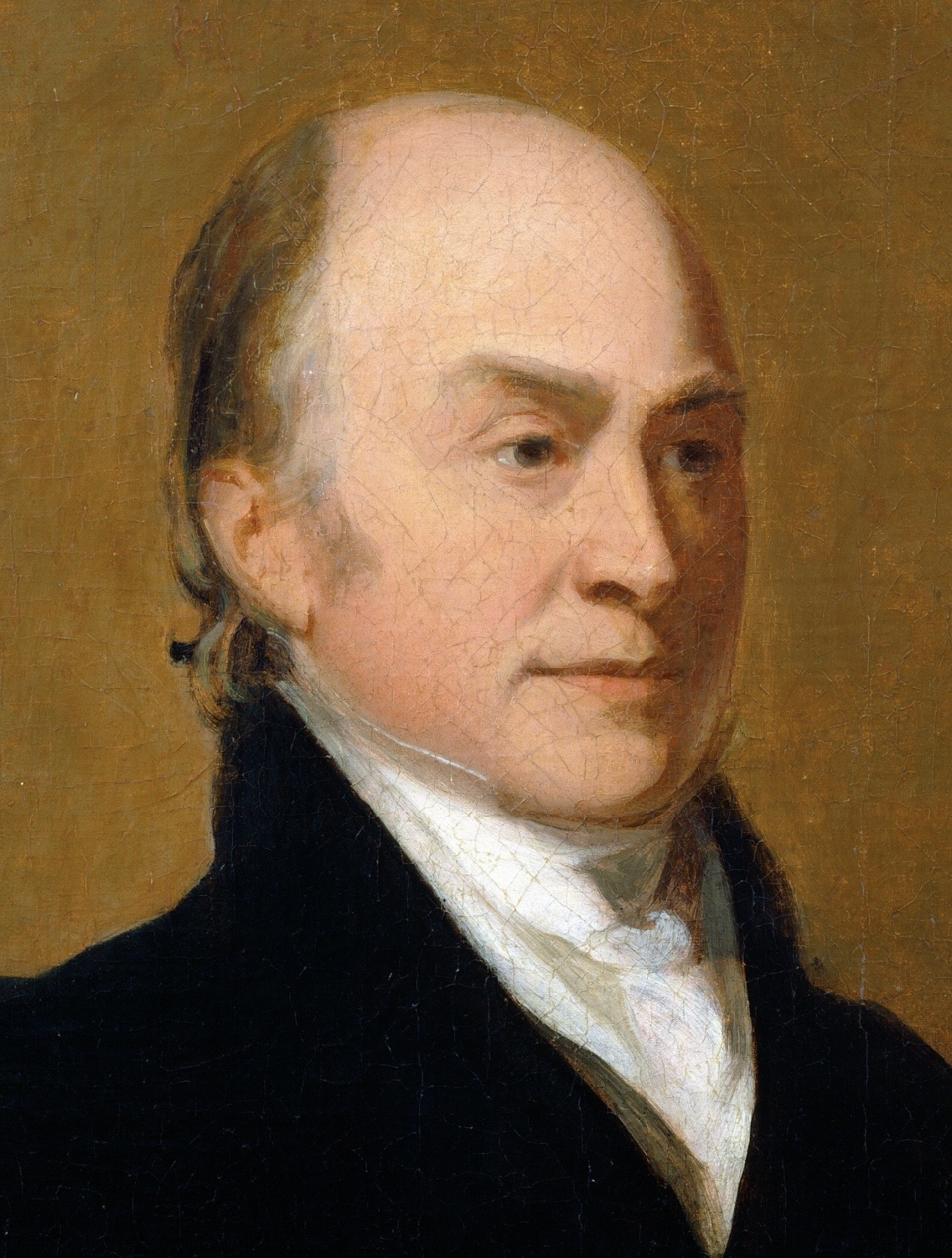

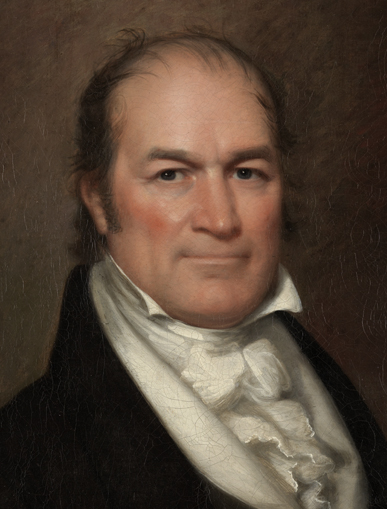
Nominee	John Quincy Adams	William H. Crawford
Party	Democratic-Republican	Democratic-Republican
Alliance	Adams-Clay Republican	Old Republican
Home state	Massachusetts	Georgia
Running mate	John C. Calhoun	Nathaniel Macon
Electoral vote	8	0
Popular vote	7,494	1,965
Percentage	70.39%	18.46%

Quincy Adams
50–60%
60–70%
70–80%
80–90%
90–100%
Crawford
50–60%
60–70%
70–80%
80–90%
90–100%
Tie
50%
No Data/Vote:
President before election
James Monroe
Democratic-Republican
Elected President
John Quincy Adams
Democratic-Republican

The 1824 United States presidential election in Connecticut took place between October 26 and December 2, 1824, as part of the 1824 United States presidential election. Voters chose eight representatives, or electors to the Electoral College, who voted for President and Vice President.

During this election, the Democratic-Republican Party was the only major national party, and four different candidates from this party sought the Presidency. Connecticut voted for John Quincy Adams over William H. Crawford, Andrew Jackson, and Henry Clay. Adams won Connecticut by a margin of 51.93%.

== Results ==
1824 United States presidential election in Connecticut
Party	Candidate	Votes	Percentage	Electoral votes
Democratic-Republican	John Quincy Adams	7,494	70.39%	8
Democratic-Republican	William H. Crawford	1,965	18.46%	0
N/A	Other	1,188	11.16%	0
Totals		10,647	100.0%	8

== See also ==
- United States presidential elections in Connecticut
