= 1856 United States presidential election in Connecticut =

- November 4, 1856
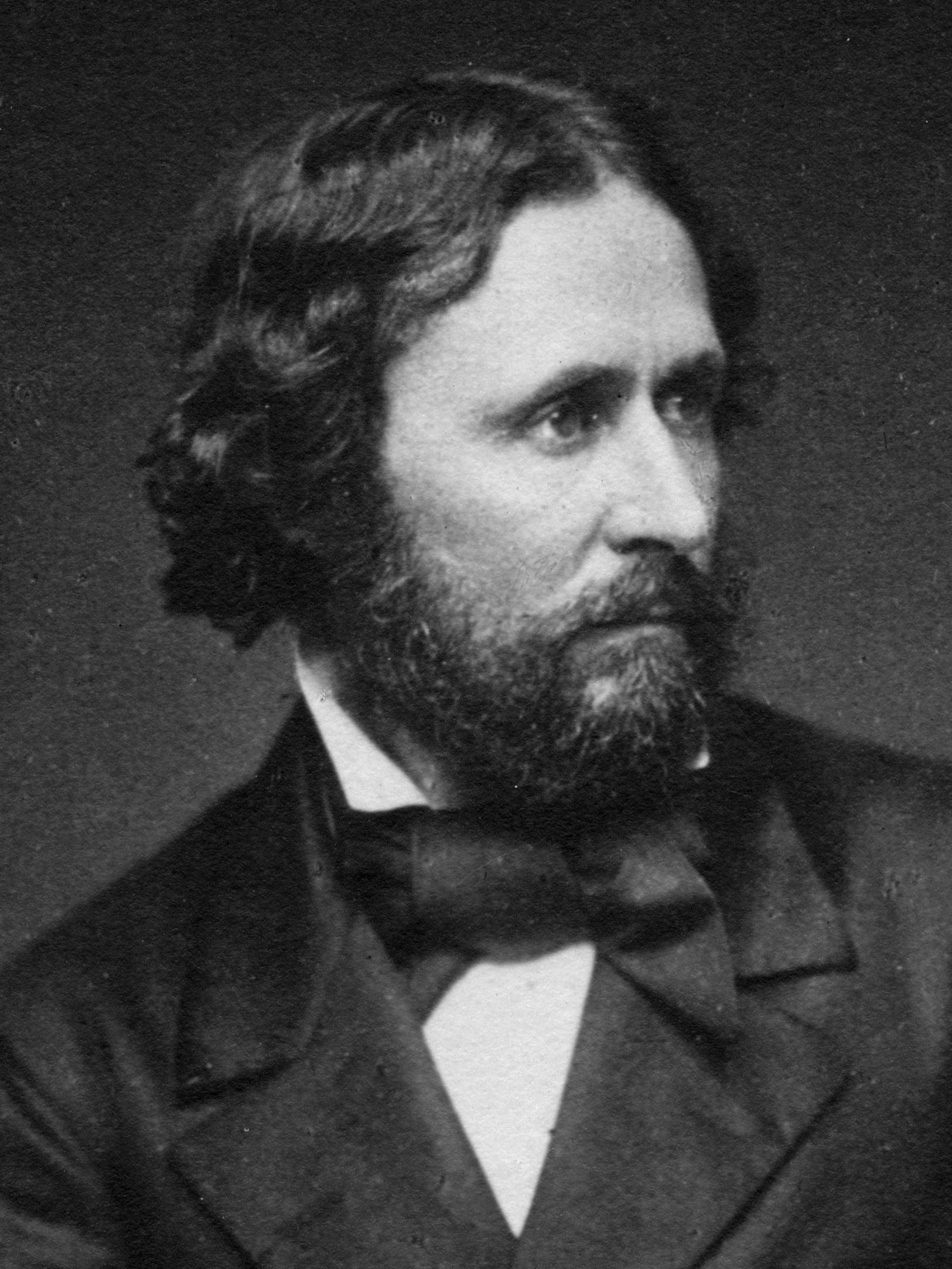

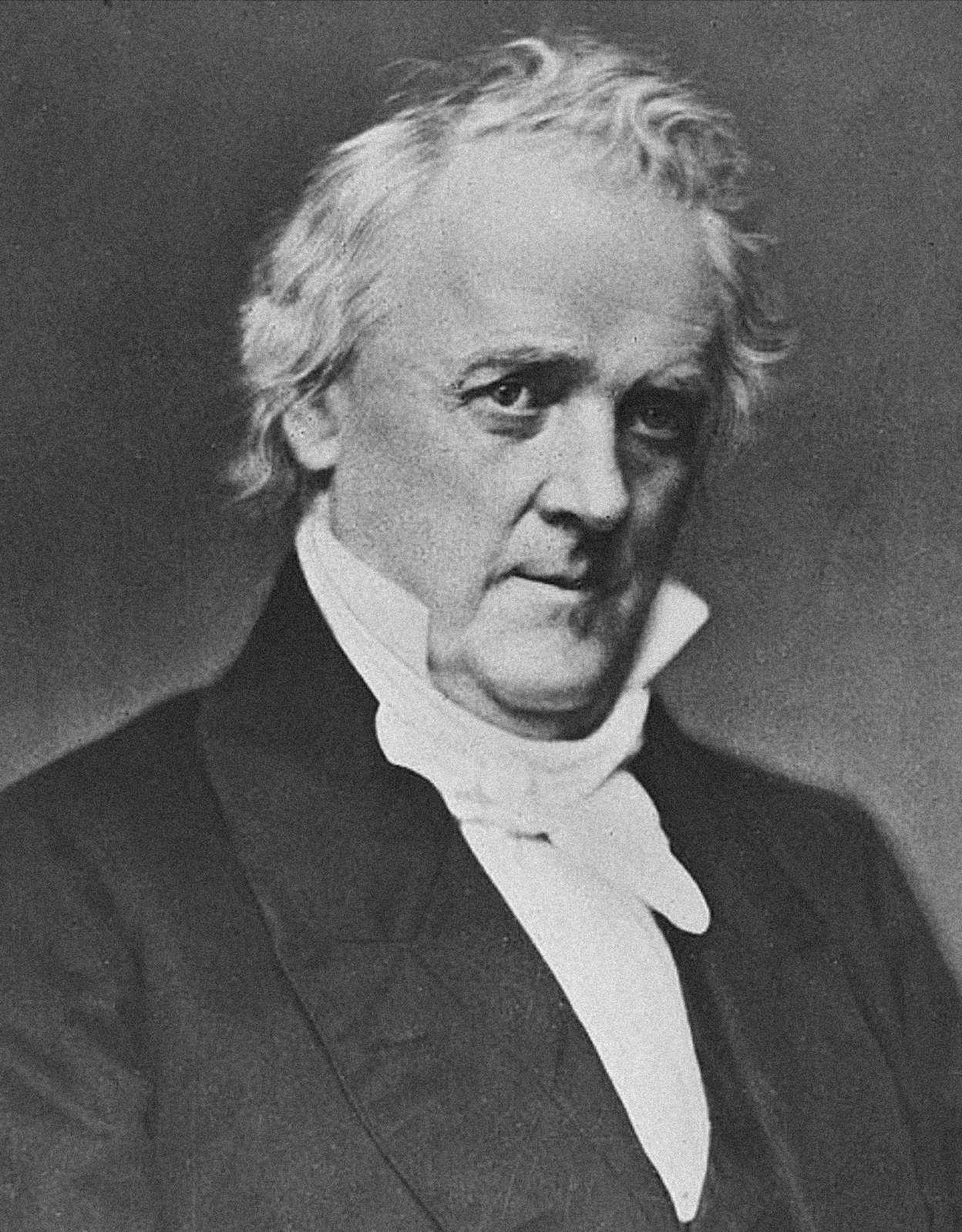
Nominee	John C. Frémont	James Buchanan
Party	Republican	Democratic
Home state	California	Pennsylvania
Running mate	William L. Dayton	John C. Breckinridge
Electoral vote	6	0
Popular vote	42,717	34,997
Percentage	53.18%	43.57%

Frémont
40–50%
50–60%
60–70%
70–80%
Buchanan
40–50%
50–60%
60–70%
70–80%
President before election
Franklin Pierce
Democratic
Elected President
James Buchanan
Democratic

The 1856 United States presidential election in Connecticut took place on November 4, 1856, as part of the 1856 United States presidential election. Voters chose six representatives, or electors to the Electoral College, who voted for president and vice president.

Connecticut voted for the Republican candidate, John C. Frémont, over the Democratic candidate, James Buchanan, and the Know Nothing candidate, Millard Fillmore. Frémont won the state by a margin of 9.61%.

== Results ==
1856 United States presidential election in Connecticut
Party	Candidate	Votes	%
Republican	John C. Fremont	42,717	53.18%
Democratic	James Buchanan	34,997	43.57%
Know Nothing	Millard Fillmore	2,615	3.26%
Total votes		80,329	100%

=== Results By County ===
1856 United States Presidential Election in Connecticut (By County)
County	John C. Frémont Republican		James Buchanan Democratic		Millard Fillmore Know Nothing		Total Votes Cast
County	#	%	#	%	#	%	Total Votes Cast
Fairfield	6,234	49.08%	5,539	43.61%	928	7.31%	12,701
Hartford	8,416	53.39%	7,038	44.65%	309	1.97%	15,763
Litchfield	5,482	57.00%	3,986	41.44%	150	1.56%	9,618
Middlesex	2,887	47.84%	2,965	49.13%	183	3.03%	6,035
New Haven	7,975	50.18%	7,315	46.02%	604	3.80%	15,894
New London	5,403	55.67%	3,953	40.73%	350	3.61%	9,706
Tolland	2,407	54.77%	1,953	44.44%	35	0.80%	4,395
Windham	2,913	55.84%	2,248	43.09%	56	1.07%	5,217
Total	42,717	53.18%	34,997	43.57%	2,615	3.26%	80,329

== See also ==
- United States presidential elections in Connecticut
