= 1868 United States presidential election in Connecticut =

- November 3, 1868
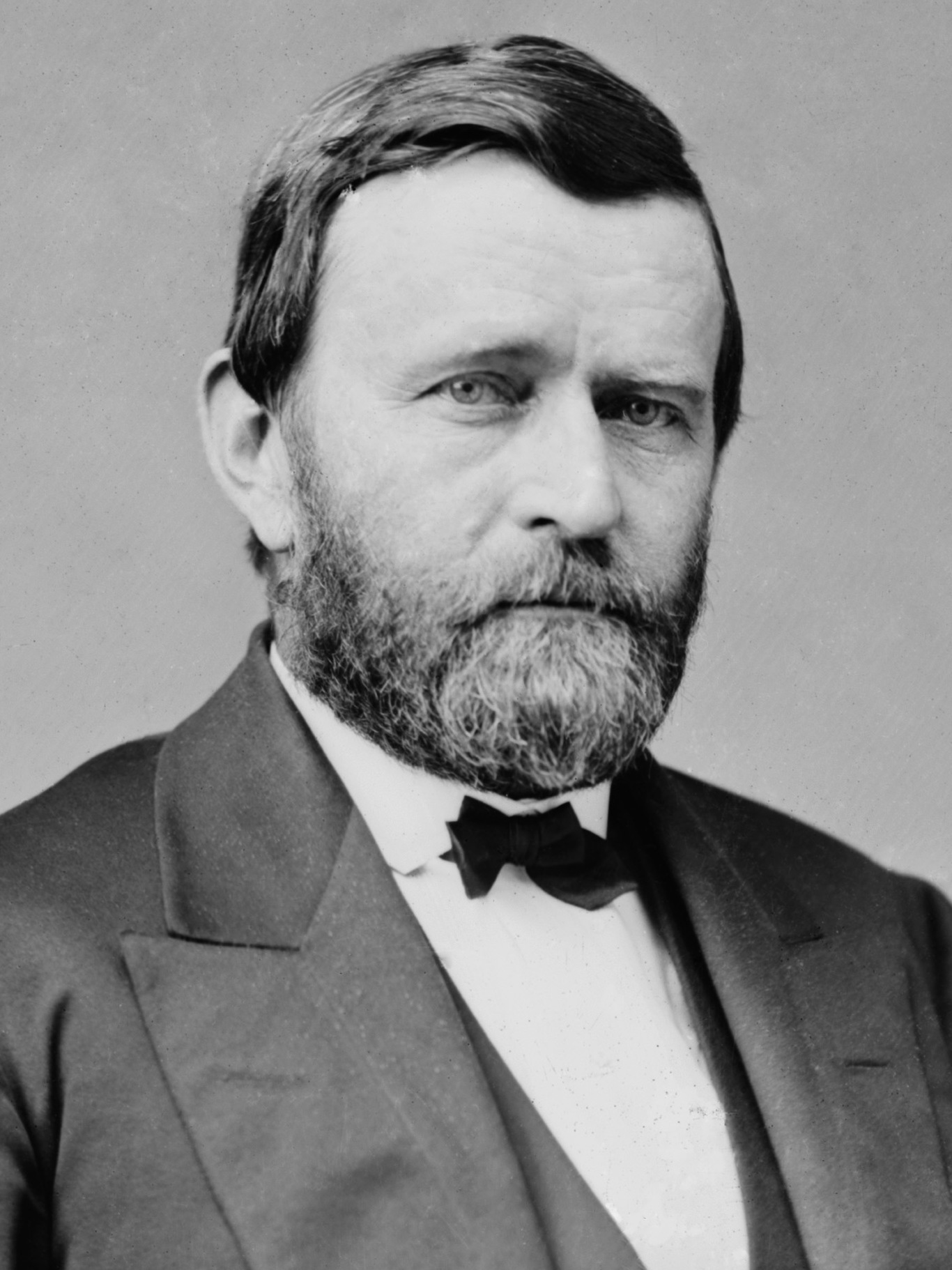

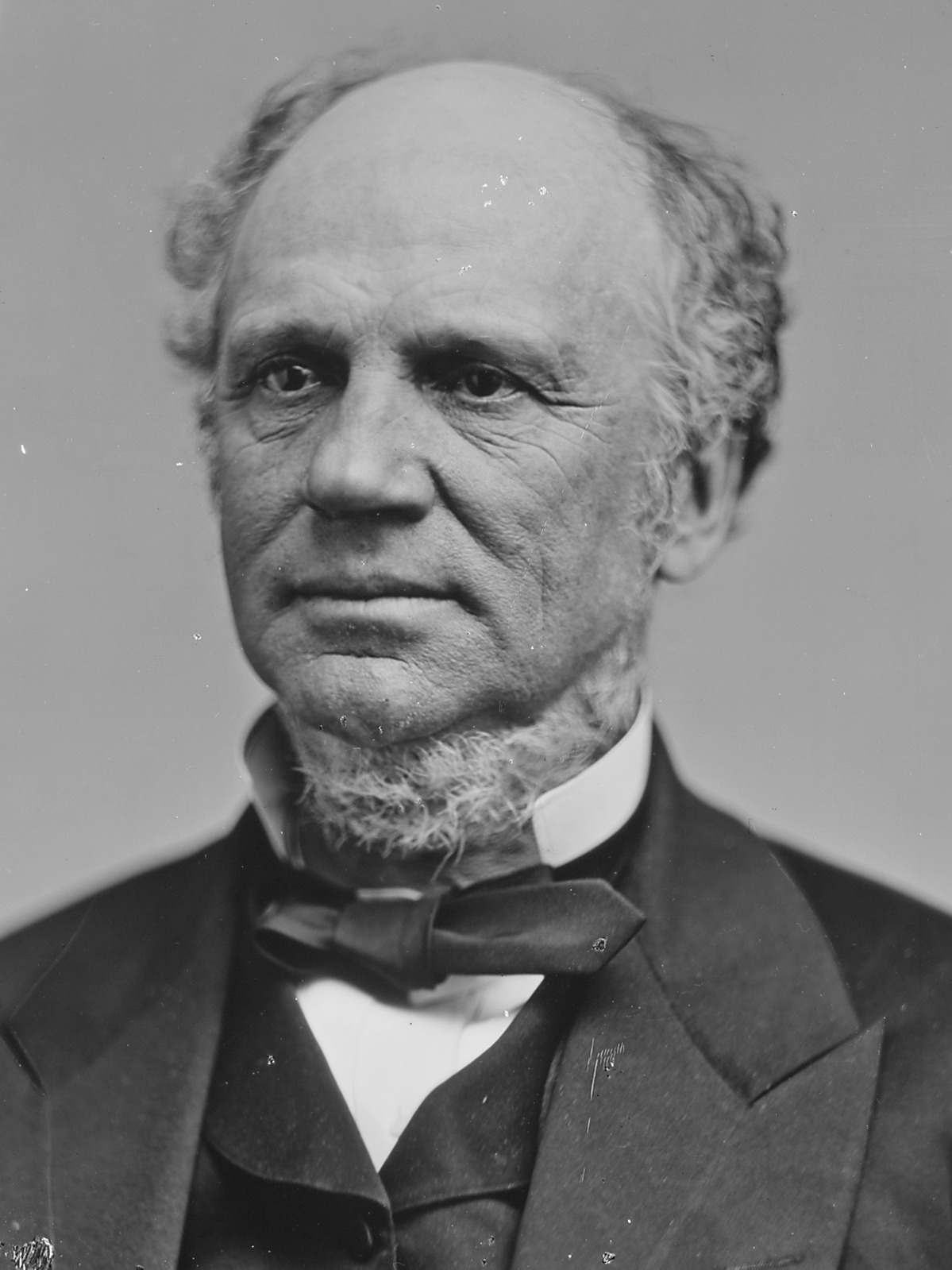
Nominee	Ulysses S. Grant	Horatio Seymour
Party	Republican	Democratic
Home state	Illinois	New York
Running mate	Schuyler Colfax	Francis Preston Blair Jr.
Electoral vote	6	0
Popular vote	50,788	47,844
Percentage	51.49%	48.51%

Grant
50–60%
60–70%
70–80%
Seymour
50–60%
60–70%
70–80%
Tie
50%
No Data/Vote:
President before election
Andrew Johnson
Democratic
Elected President
Ulysses S. Grant
Republican

The 1868 United States presidential election in Connecticut took place on November 3, 1868, as part of the 1868 United States presidential election. Voters chose six representatives, or electors to the Electoral College, who voted for president and vice president.

Connecticut voted for the Republican nominee, Ulysses S. Grant, over the Democratic nominee, Horatio Seymour. Grant won the state by a narrow margin of 2.98%.

== Results ==
1868 United States presidential election in Connecticut
Party	Candidate	Running mate	Popular vote		Electoral vote	
Party	Candidate	Running mate	Count	%	Count	%
Republican	Ulysses S. Grant of Illinois	Schuyler Colfax of Indiana	50,788	51.49%	6	100.00%
Democratic	Horatio Seymour of New York	Francis Preston Blair Jr. of Missouri	47,844	48.51%	0	0.00%
Total			98,632	100.00%	6	100.00%

== See also ==
- United States presidential elections in Connecticut
