= 1844 United States presidential election in Connecticut =

- November 4, 1844
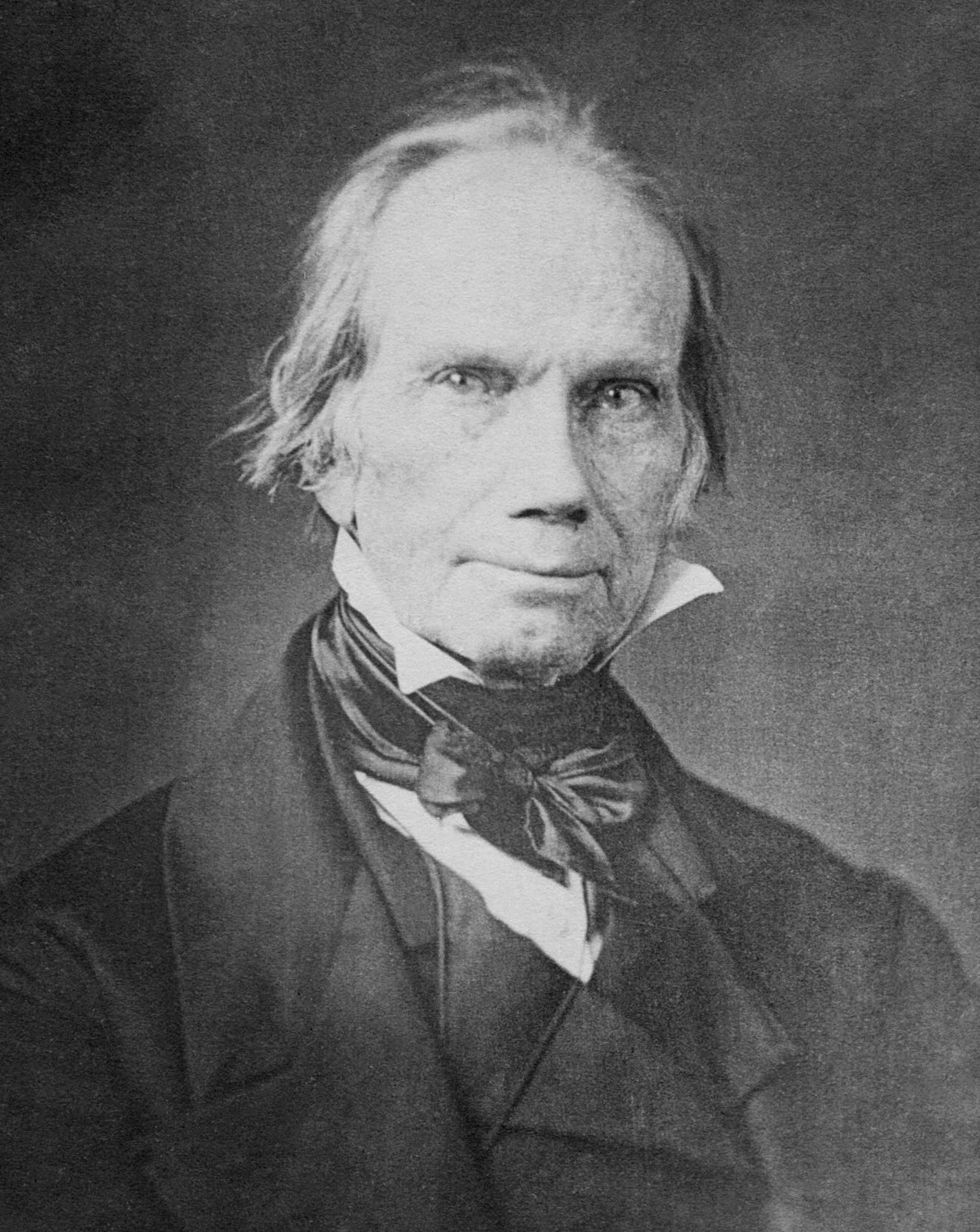

Nominee	Henry Clay	James K. Polk
Party	Whig	Democratic
Home state	Kentucky	Tennessee
Running mate	Theodore Frelinghuysen	George M. Dallas
Electoral vote	6	0
Popular vote	32,832	29,831
Percentage	50.81%	46.18%

Clay
40–50%
50–60%
60–70%
70–80%
Polk
40–50%
50–60%
60–70%
70–80%
Tie
50%
President before election
John Tyler
Independent
Elected President
James K. Polk
Democratic

A presidential election was held in Connecticut on November 4, 1844 as part of the 1844 United States presidential election. Voters chose six representatives, or electors to the Electoral College, who voted for President and Vice President.

Connecticut voted for the Whig candidate, Henry Clay, over Democratic candidate James K. Polk. Clay won Connecticut by a narrow margin of 4.63%.

To date, this is the most recent presidential election in which the town of Woodbury voted for the Democratic nominee.

== Results ==
1844 United States presidential election in Connecticut
Party	Candidate	Running mate	Popular vote		Electoral vote	
Party	Candidate	Running mate	Count	%	Count	%
Whig	Henry Clay of Kentucky	Theodore Frelinghuysen of New York	32,832	50.81%	6	100.00%
Democratic	James K. Polk of Tennessee	George M. Dallas of Pennsylvania	29,841	46.18%	0	0.00%
Liberty	James G. Birney of Michigan	Thomas Morris of Ohio	1,943	3.01%	0	0.00%
Total			64,616	100.00%	6	100.00%

== See also ==
- United States presidential elections in Connecticut
