= 1832 United States presidential election in Connecticut =

- November 2 – December 5, 1832
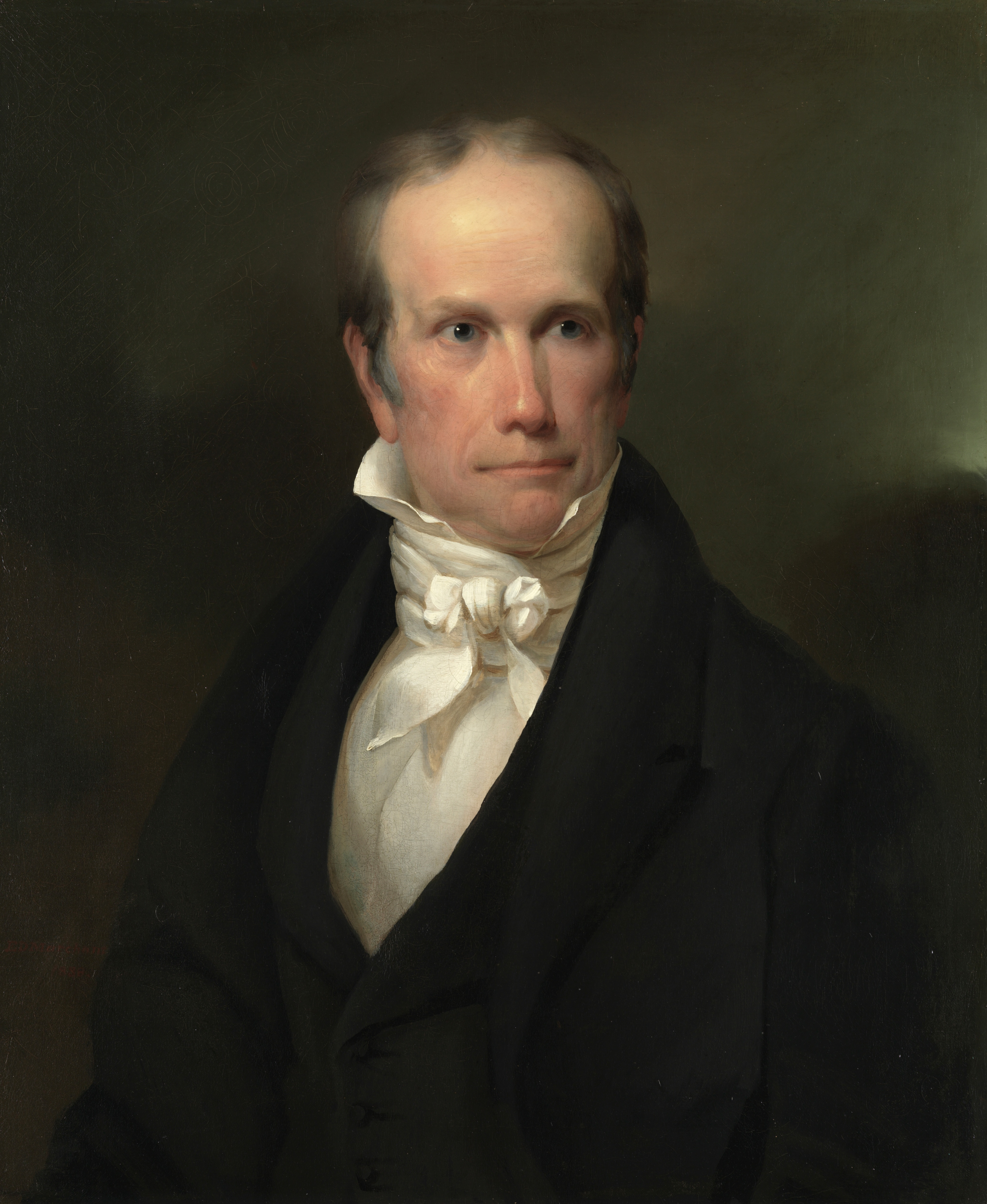

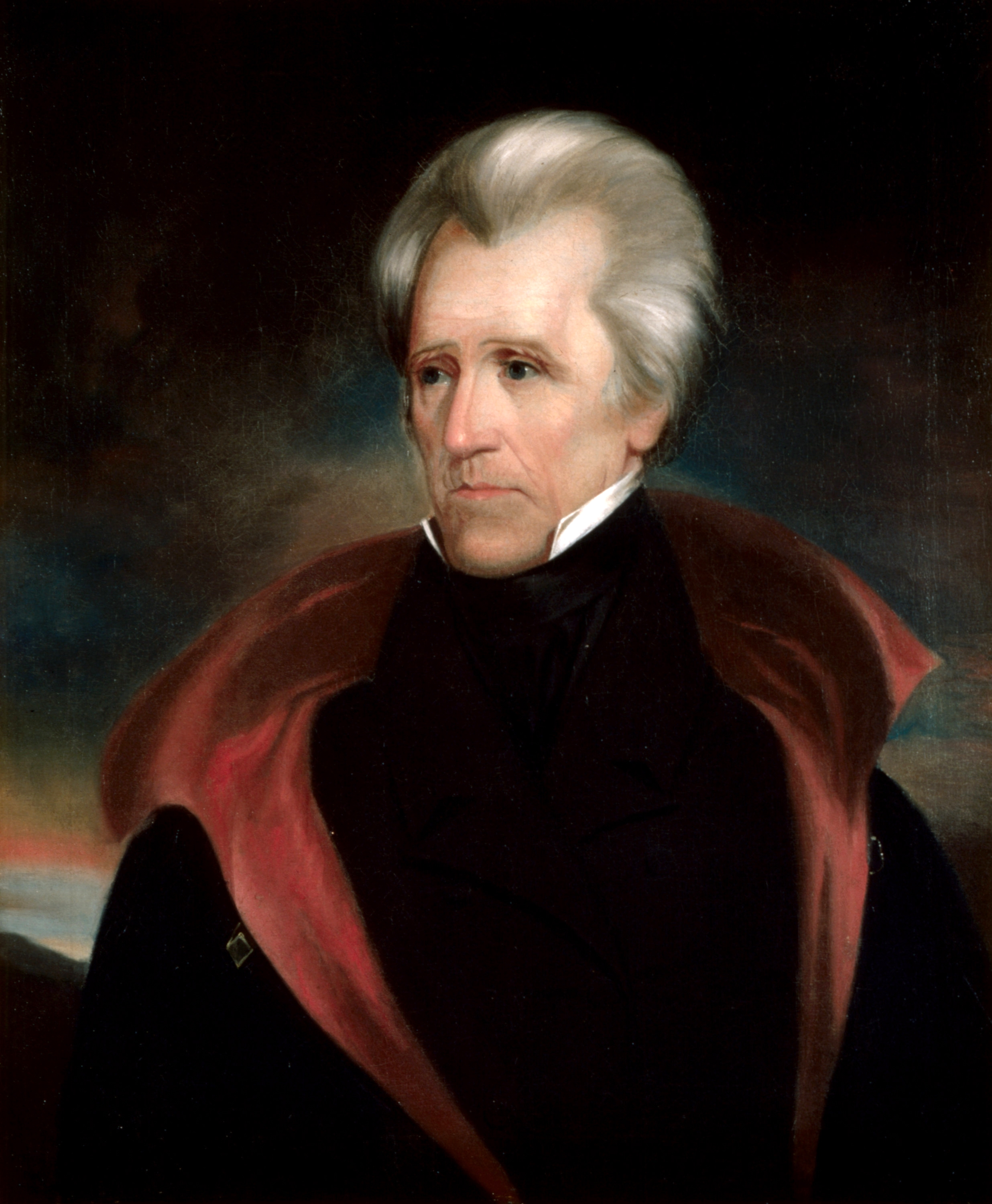

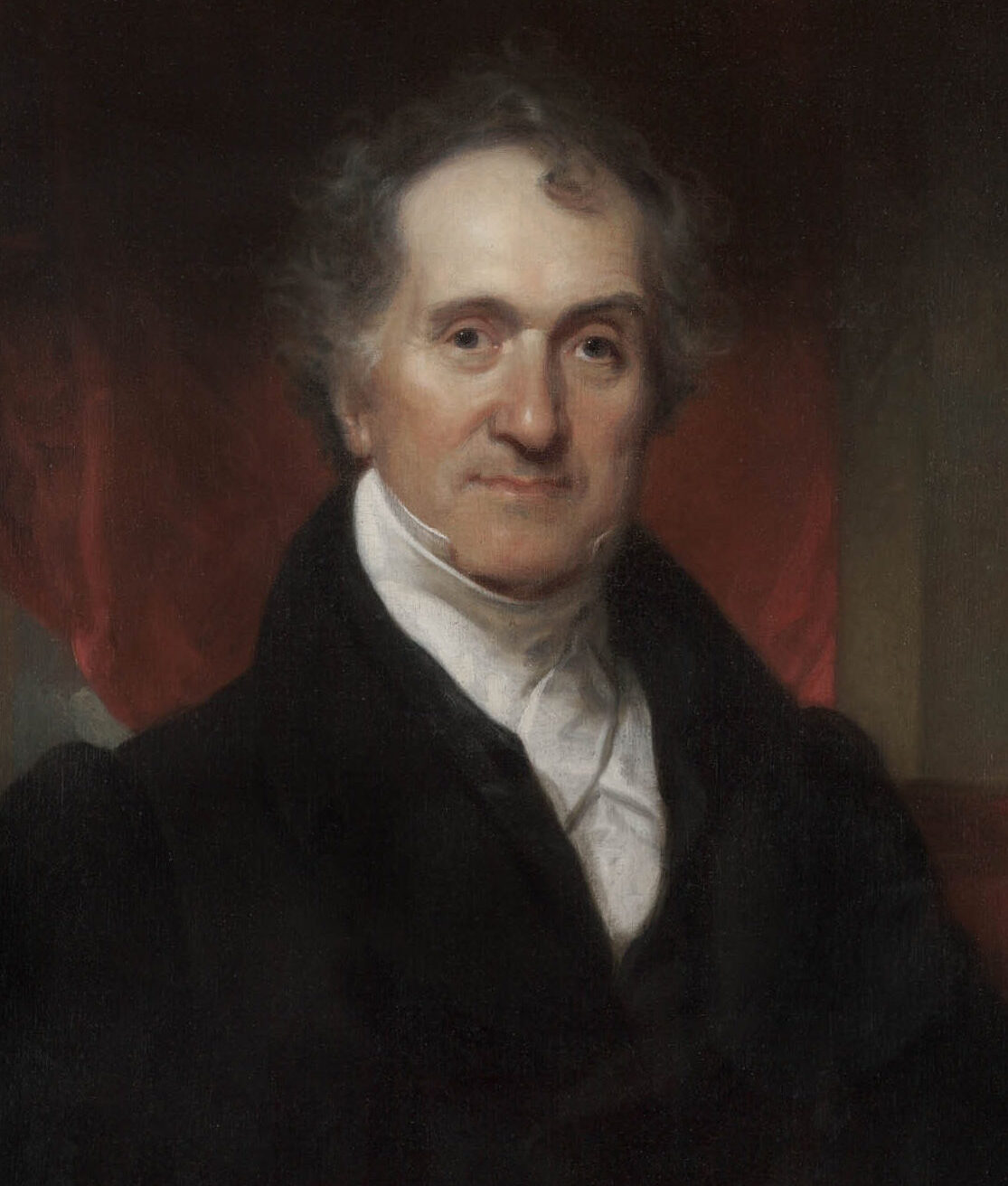
Nominee	Henry Clay	Andrew Jackson	William Wirt
Party	National Republican	Democratic	Anti-Masonic
Home state	Kentucky	Tennessee	Maryland
Running mate	John Sergeant	Martin Van Buren	Amos Ellmaker
Electoral vote	8	0	0
Popular vote	18,155	11,269	3,409
Percentage	55.29%	34.32%	10.38%

Clay
40–50%
50–60%
60–70%
70–80%
80–90%
90–100%
Jackson
40–50%
50–60%
60–70%
Wirt:
40–50%
50–60%
60–70%
Tie
40–50%
50%

The 1832 United States presidential election in Connecticut took place between November 2 and December 5, 1832, as part of the 1832 United States presidential election. Voters chose eight representatives, or electors to the Electoral College, who voted for president and vice president.

Connecticut voted for the National Republican candidate, Henry Clay, over the Democratic Party candidate, Andrew Jackson and the Anti-Masonic Party candidate, William Wirt. Clay won Connecticut by a margin of 20.97%. This is the only time a Democrat was elected president more than once without ever carrying the state.

== Results ==
1832 United States presidential election in Connecticut
Party	Candidate	Votes	Percentage	Electoral votes
National Republican	Henry Clay	18,155	55.29%	8
Democratic	Andrew Jackson (incumbent)	11,269	34.32%	0
Anti-Masonic	William Wirt	3,409	10.38%	0
Totals		32,833	100.0%	8

== See also ==
- United States presidential elections in Connecticut
