= Elections in Connecticut =

United States presidential election results for Connecticut
| Year | Republican / Whig | | Democratic | | Third party(ies) | |
| Year | No. | % | No. | % | No. | % |
|---|---|---|---|---|---|---|
| 1824 | 7,494 | 70.39% | 1,965 | 18.46% | 1,188 | 11.16% |
| 1828 | 13,829 | 71.36% | 4,448 | 22.95% | 1,101 | 5.68% |
| 1832 | 18,155 | 55.29% | 11,269 | 34.32% | 3,409 | 10.38% |
| 1836 | 18,799 | 49.35% | 19,294 | 50.65% | 0 | 0.00% |
| 1840 | 31,598 | 55.55% | 25,281 | 44.45% | 0 | 0.00% |
| 1844 | 32,832 | 50.81% | 29,841 | 46.18% | 1,943 | 3.01% |
| 1848 | 30,318 | 48.59% | 27,051 | 43.35% | 5,029 | 8.06% |
| 1852 | 30,359 | 45.46% | 33,249 | 49.79% | 3,173 | 4.75% |
| 1856 | 42,717 | 53.18% | 34,997 | 43.57% | 2,615 | 3.26% |
| 1860 | 43,486 | 53.86% | 17,364 | 21.50% | 19,895 | 24.64% |
| 1864 | 44,693 | 51.38% | 42,288 | 48.62% | 0 | 0.00% |
| 1868 | 50,788 | 51.49% | 47,844 | 48.51% | 0 | 0.00% |
| 1872 | 50,314 | 52.41% | 45,695 | 47.59% | 0 | 0.00% |
| 1876 | 59,033 | 48.33% | 61,927 | 50.70% | 1,174 | 0.96% |
| 1880 | 67,071 | 50.51% | 64,411 | 48.50% | 1,316 | 0.99% |
| 1884 | 65,898 | 48.01% | 67,182 | 48.95% | 4,177 | 3.04% |
| 1888 | 74,584 | 48.44% | 74,920 | 48.66% | 4,474 | 2.91% |
| 1892 | 77,032 | 46.80% | 82,395 | 50.06% | 5,168 | 3.14% |
| 1896 | 110,285 | 63.24% | 56,740 | 32.54% | 7,365 | 4.22% |
| 1900 | 102,572 | 56.92% | 74,014 | 41.07% | 3,609 | 2.00% |
| 1904 | 111,089 | 58.12% | 72,909 | 38.15% | 7,130 | 3.73% |
| 1908 | 112,915 | 59.43% | 68,255 | 35.92% | 8,833 | 4.65% |
| 1912 | 68,324 | 35.88% | 74,561 | 39.16% | 47,519 | 24.96% |
| 1916 | 106,514 | 49.80% | 99,786 | 46.66% | 7,574 | 3.54% |
| 1920 | 229,238 | 62.72% | 120,721 | 33.03% | 15,559 | 4.26% |
| 1924 | 246,322 | 61.54% | 110,184 | 27.53% | 43,789 | 10.94% |
| 1928 | 296,641 | 53.63% | 252,085 | 45.57% | 4,398 | 0.80% |
| 1932 | 288,420 | 48.54% | 281,632 | 47.40% | 24,131 | 4.06% |
| 1936 | 278,685 | 40.35% | 382,129 | 55.32% | 29,909 | 4.33% |
| 1940 | 361,819 | 46.30% | 417,621 | 53.44% | 2,062 | 0.26% |
| 1944 | 390,527 | 46.94% | 435,146 | 52.30% | 6,317 | 0.76% |
| 1948 | 437,754 | 49.55% | 423,297 | 47.91% | 22,467 | 2.54% |
| 1952 | 611,012 | 55.70% | 481,649 | 43.91% | 4,250 | 0.39% |
| 1956 | 711,837 | 63.72% | 405,079 | 36.26% | 205 | 0.02% |
| 1960 | 565,813 | 46.27% | 657,055 | 53.73% | 15 | 0.00% |
| 1964 | 390,996 | 32.09% | 826,269 | 67.81% | 1,313 | 0.11% |
| 1968 | 556,721 | 44.32% | 621,561 | 49.48% | 77,950 | 6.21% |
| 1972 | 810,763 | 58.57% | 555,498 | 40.13% | 18,016 | 1.30% |
| 1976 | 719,261 | 52.06% | 647,895 | 46.90% | 14,370 | 1.04% |
| 1980 | 677,210 | 48.16% | 541,732 | 38.52% | 187,343 | 13.32% |
| 1984 | 890,877 | 60.73% | 569,597 | 38.83% | 6,426 | 0.44% |
| 1988 | 750,241 | 51.98% | 676,584 | 46.87% | 16,569 | 1.15% |
| 1992 | 578,313 | 35.78% | 682,318 | 42.21% | 355,701 | 22.01% |
| 1996 | 483,109 | 34.69% | 735,740 | 52.83% | 173,765 | 12.48% |
| 2000 | 561,094 | 38.44% | 816,015 | 55.91% | 82,416 | 5.65% |
| 2004 | 693,826 | 43.95% | 857,488 | 54.31% | 27,455 | 1.74% |
| 2008 | 629,428 | 38.22% | 997,773 | 60.59% | 19,592 | 1.19% |
| 2012 | 634,899 | 40.72% | 905,109 | 58.06% | 18,985 | 1.22% |
| 2016 | 673,215 | 40.93% | 897,572 | 54.57% | 74,133 | 4.51% |
| 2020 | 715,311 | 39.21% | 1,080,831 | 59.24% | 28,314 | 1.55% |
| 2024 | 736,918 | 41.89% | 992,053 | 56.40% | 30,039 | 1.71% |

Various kinds of elections in Connecticut occur annually in each of the state's cities and towns, the exact type of which is dependent on the year. Elections for federal and statewide offices occur in even-numbered years, while municipal elections occur in odd-numbered ones. The office of the Connecticut secretary of state oversees the election process, including voting and vote counting. In a 2020 study, Connecticut was ranked as the 20th easiest state for citizens to vote in.

Historically, Connecticut was a bastion of Republicanism, although this was typically a liberal "Yankee" brand of the Republican Party. From the Civil War to the 1990s, the state voted Republican all but nine times on the presidential level. It only voted Democratic in the elections of 1876, 1888, 1912, 1936, 1940, 1944, 1960, 1964, and 1968. However, since the 1992 election, the state has voted Democratic every time, and since 1996, it has been by double-digit margins.

However, Democrats have controlled the state legislature for all but 13 years since 1959 and have held both Senate seats since 1989, as no Republican has won a Senate seat in the state since 1982. Every seat in the House of Representatives is held by a Democrat, with the last Republican having lost in 2008. That election marked the first time since the 1850s that no Republican represented Connecticut or any state in New England region in the House.

== Offices elected by the people of Connecticut ==
=== Federal ===
- President: The state of Connecticut is currently apportioned seven United States Electoral College members in presidential elections. In the 2024 election, Kamala Harris received 56.4% of votes cast for president, thus winning all of the state's seven electoral votes.
- United States Senate: As with all U.S. states, Connecticut elects two members to the United States Senate. The current senators elected from Connecticut are Richard Blumenthal and Chris Murphy, both Democrats. Senators serve six-year terms. The most recent U.S. Senate election in the state occurred on November 5, 2024.
- United States House of Representatives: Connecticut currently has five congressional districts, each of which elects one member to the United States House of Representatives. The incumbent five are all members of the Democratic Party. Representatives serve two-year terms. The most recent congressional elections took place in the state on November 5, 2024.

=== State ===
- Governor and Lieutenant Governor: The governor and lieutenant governor are elected to four-year terms in the next even-year election cycle that follows a presidential election. The governor and lieutenant governor are elected on the same ballot line, though they run separately in primary elections. The current governor of Connecticut is Ned Lamont, a Democrat who took office in 2019. His lieutenant is Susan Bysiewicz.
- Constitutional Officers: The Constitutional Officers of the state are composed of the state Attorney General, Secretary of the State, Comptroller, and Treasurer. All are elected to four-year terms in the same cycle as gubernatorial elections. The incumbent four officers are all members of the Democratic Party.
- General Assembly: The Connecticut General Assembly is the state's bicameral state legislature. It is composed of two houses:
  - Connecticut Senate: The Connecticut Senate is the upper house of the state legislature. There are 36 senatorial districts in the state, each of which elects one member to the Senate. The full Senate is up for election every two years. The most recent election was held on November 8, 2022.
  - Connecticut House of Representatives: The Connecticut House of Representatives is the lower house of the state legislature. There are 151 assembly districts in the state, each of which elects one member to the House. The full House is up for election every two years. The most recent election was held on November 8, 2022.
- Others
  - Judges of Probate: Judges of Probate are the only elected members of the judicial branch of government in Connecticut. Judges hold office for a period of four years, their election is held at the same time as gubernatorial elections. The jurisdiction of probate judges extends to the legal affairs of the deceased, some aspects of family law, conservatorship, and other matters. The most recent elections for probate judges were held on November 3, 2020.
  - Registrars of Voters: Connecticut state law mandates that each city and town in the state elect one Registrar of Voters from each of the two "major" parties (currently the Democratic and Republican parties) to serve as election administrators and to handle various other election-related affairs in their respective municipality. A third party registrar may be elected in addition to the required Republican and Democrat if such candidate receives more votes than either the Republican or Democratic nominee. This has only happened twice in state history when it occurred in Hartford in 2008 and 2012. The term length and year of election of registrars differs among the state's municipalities.

=== Local ===
Elections for local government include elections for municipal leadership positions (such as mayor or first selectman), legislative bodies (such as a city council or a board of aldermen), and other elections for various municipal positions and boards and commissions, as governed by each municipality's respective charter and/or ordinances. Of the 169 towns and cities in the state, all hold municipal elections in odd-numbered years, and most hold them on the traditional Election Day in November. Fifteen communities in the state, however, hold their municipal elections in May.

Unlike in most U.S. states, there is no form of county government in Connecticut. The eight counties in the state now exist solely for geographical purposes. Governing at the county level was abolished in the state in 1960, and its last holdover, county sheriffs, were eliminated by an amendment to the state constitution in 2000.

== Party affiliation in Connecticut ==
The majority of Connecticut voters are affiliated with either of the two major political parties, but the plurality of voters have no party affiliation.

The state of Connecticut has a closed primary system, whereby only electors enrolled in a political party can vote in their party's primary election. A registered Republican, for example, is only allowed to participate in Republican primaries, while a voter not affiliated with any political party (called an “unaffiliated” voter in the state) is not allowed to vote in any party primary.

Party registration as of November 1, 2022
| Party | Total voters | Percentage |
|---|---|---|
| Unaffiliated | 1,033,470 | 41.76% |
| Democratic | 898,303 | 36.3% |
| Republican | 502,482 | 20.3% |
| Minor parties | 40,143 | 1.62% |
| Total | 2,474,398 | 100% |

== Recent election results ==
=== Federal ===
- Presidential: 2000, 2004, 2008, 2012, 2016, 2020, 2024
- Senatorial: 1998, 2000, 2004, 2006, 2010, 2012, 2016, 2018, 2022
- Congressional: 2006, 2008, 2010, 2012, 2014, 2016, 2018, 2020, 2022

=== State ===
- Gubernatorial: 1990, 1994, 1998, 2002, 2006, 2010, 2014, 2018, 2022
- Attorney General: 1990, 1994, 1998, 2002, 2006, 2010, 2014, 2018, 2022
- State Senate: 2006, 2008, 2010, 2018, 2020, 2022
- State House: 2010, 2014, 2016, 2018, 2020, 2022

== Other voter responsibilities ==
Connecticut has no system of initiative or referendums at the statewide level, but any proposed amendment to the state constitution, after having first been passed by both houses of the state legislature in accordance with Article XII of the Connecticut Constitution, must be ratified by the people of the state via a ballot question. Additionally, in accordance with Article XIII, every 20 years (or 20 years after a constitutional convention was last called for) citizens of the state shall be allowed to vote on whether a constitutional convention to amend or revise the state constitution should be called.

Constitutional Question 1
- November 8, 2022

Results
| Choice | Votes | % |
|---|---|---|
| Yes | 694,833 | 60.56% |
| No | 452,453 | 39.44% |
- Municipal results Yes: 50–60% 60–70% 70–80% 80–90% No: 50–60% 60–70%

The most recent constitutional amendment proposition was Question 1 in 2022 which allowed the legislature to create a period of early voting for elections in the state of Connecticut. and it passed 60.5% to 39.5%. The most recent constitutional convention question appeared on the ballot on November 4, 2008, and the call for a convention was rejected 847,518 to 579,904.

While there is no statewide initiative or referendums, many municipalities have some form of it for issues of local concern. Additionally, five municipalities afford voters the right to recall local elected public officials, a practice that does not extend to state offices.

=== Filling U.S. Senate vacancies ===
On June 26, 2009, Connecticut Governor M. Jodi Rell signed into law a bill that requires that a special election be called under most circumstances should a vacancy occur in either of Connecticut's two U.S. Senate seats. Prior to this law, the governor of the state had the right to appoint a replacement to fill such vacancies.

Since passed, this law has not yet been used.

== See also ==
- United States presidential elections in Connecticut
- Political party strength in Connecticut
