= Scott D. Malkin =

American lawyer

- Born: 1959 (age 66–67)
- Education: Harvard University (BA, JD, MBA)
- Occupation: businessman
- Known for: founder of Value Retail Plc
- Spouse: Laura Rice Russell
- Children: 4
- Parent(s): Isabel Wien Malkin; Peter L. Malkin
- Family: Lawrence Wien (grandfather)
- Website: Official Website

Scott David Malkin (born 1959) is the founder of Value Retail Plc and co-owner of the New York Islanders professional hockey team.

== Early life and education ==
Malkin was born to a Jewish family, the son of Isabel (née Wien) and Peter L. Malkin. His father is a real estate investor in New York who owned the Empire State Building. His grandfather, Lawrence Wien, was also a real estate investor who pioneered the real estate syndication. He was raised in Connecticut and received degrees from Harvard College, Harvard Law School and Harvard Business School.

== Career ==
In 1990, Malkin sold his retail store concept, 2 Rodeo Drive in Beverly Hills, California to the Japanese department store operator Sogo and then moved to London where in 1992, he founded Value Retail Plc. With Value Retail, he used his experience in selling luxury goods and meshed it with the American outlet mall concept creating an alternative operating model to the traditional European shopping center. Value Retail focused on establishing outlet centers in the outskirts of large cities. The fashion brands pay 12.5 per cent of annual turnover for the privilege of selling excess stock in one of their village outlet centers. Although criticized for taking business from smaller retail stores in urban centers, the outlet centers only sell brand name goods that are a year old or older.

As of 2014, Value Retail had nine "villages" in Europe near London, Milan, Munich, Dublin, Barcelona, Madrid, Paris, Brussels, Antwerp, Cologne, Düsseldorf, and Frankfurt. He is expanding to China in 2015 with two new villages in Suzhou and Shanghai. By 2011, Value Retail had $1.5 billion in sales.

=== New York Islanders ===
In October 2014, it was announced that Malkin and his former college roommate Jon Ledecky would purchase the New York Islanders professional hockey team from Charles Wang. After a two-year transition period as minority owners, Malkin and Ledecky bought controlling interest in 2016.

== Personal life ==
In 1984, he married Laura Rice Russell. His sister, Cynthia Allison Malkin, is married to Richard Blumenthal who was elected as a United States senator from Connecticut in 2010. His brother Anthony Edward Malkin, is married to Rachelle Lisa "Shelly" Belfer, daughter of Robert A. Belfer and granddaughter of Arthur Belfer.

Sporting positions
Preceded by Charles Wang; Sanjay Kumar	New York Islanders owner 2016–present Served alongside: Jon Ledecky	Incumbent
