= Peter L. Malkin =

American lawyer, real estate investor

- Born: Peter Laurence Malkin; January 14, 1934 (age 92); New York City, U.S.
- Education: B.A. Harvard College; J.D. Harvard Law School
- Occupation: Real estate investor
- Spouse: Isabel Wien
- Children: 3; including Scott
- Relatives: Lawrence Wien (father-in-law); Richard Blumenthal (son-in-law); Matt Blumenthal (maternal grandson); Robert A. Belfer (co-fathers-in-law); Elizabeth Malkin Haviland (granddaughter)

Peter L. Malkin (born January 14, 1934) is an American real estate investor and chairman emeritus of Empire State Realty Trust and Malkin Holdings.

== Biography ==
Born to a Jewish family, Malkin graduated with an A.B. from Harvard College (summa cum laude, Phi Beta Kappa) in 1955; and in 1958, he graduated with a J.D. from Harvard Law School (magna cum laude). In 1958, he joined the law firm of his father-in-law Lawrence Wien as a partner (renamed Wien & Malkin LLP). His father-in-law had pioneered the concept of real estate syndicates in 1930s making the direct ownership of income property accessible to groups of individual investors for the first time. Malkin helped to expand Wien's already substantial portfolio, which included many prominent New York City buildings including the Empire State Building (which they jointly bought in 1961 with Harry Helmsley from Henry Crown), the Equitable Building, the Graybar Building, the Fisk Building, the Garment Centre Capitol Building, the Toy Center, and the Lincoln Building at One Grand Central Place. They also bought many prominent hotels including the Plaza Hotel, the Taft Hotel, Hotel St. Moritz, the Lexington Hotel, and the Hotel Governor Clinton. Malkin also helped to expand the firm's activities to Newark, Palm Beach, Philadelphia, Los Angeles, Minneapolis, and Las Vegas.

In 2013, Peter Malkin and his son Anthony raised $930 million from the secondary offering and IPO of 18 buildings in their portfolio including the Empire State Building. Peter Malkin became chairman emeritus and Anthony became chairman, president, and CEO. The new publicly traded entity is named the Empire State Realty Trust (ticker ESRT). Prior to the IPO, the family firm, Wien and Malkin, was renamed Malkin Holdings.

== Philanthropy, boardships, and awards ==
Malkin is the founding chairman of the Grand Central Partnership, Inc. and of the 34th Street Partnership, Inc.; and a founder and director of The Fashion Center Business Improvement District. Malkin is co-chair of the Real Estate and Construction Council of Lincoln Center for the Performing Arts, Trustee Emeritus and co-chair of Trustee Emeritus Council of Lincoln Center for the Performing Arts, co-chairman emeritus of the Real Estate Council of the Metropolitan Museum of Art, founder and chairman emeritus of the Dean's Council of the John F. Kennedy School of Government at Harvard University, co-founder and honorary co-chair of the Committee Encouraging Corporate Philanthropy, a director emeritus of U.S. Trust Corporation, a member of the board of advisors for Bank of America Global Wealth Investment Management, a vice president and director of the Realty Foundation of New York and a partner in the New York City Partnership, a governor emeritus of the Real Estate Board of New York, a former member of the Mayor's Business Advisory Committee during the administration of Mayor Rudolph Giuliani, and former member of the Board of Overseers of Harvard College; the recipient of 3 National Honor Awards, trustee emeritus and chairman of the Council of the National Trust for Historic Preservation. Malkin is the founder of Merritt Parkway Conservancy, Greenwich Tree Conservancy and Greenwich Green & Clean, all non-profit organizations based in Connecticut.

Malkin has served on 15 different committees at Harvard University, and Harvard's Indoor Athletic Building was renamed the Malkin Athletic Center in 1986 in honor of his $4M donation to renovate it.

In 2012, he was awarded the Jack D. Weiler Award by the United Jewish Appeal of New York. Malkin also served as vice president of Federation of Jewish Philanthropies.

== Personal life ==
He is married to Isabel Wien, daughter of real-estate investor Lawrence Wien. They have three children: their daughter, Cynthia Allison Malkin, is married to Richard Blumenthal, who was elected as United States senator from Connecticut in 2010; son Anthony Edward Malkin is married to Rachelle Lisa "Shelly" Belfer, daughter of Robert A. Belfer and granddaughter of Arthur Belfer, and their wedding took place at Temple Emanu-El in Manhattan; and son Scott David Malkin is married to Laura Rice Russell and became a co-owner of the New York Islanders in 2014. His grandson, Matt Blumenthal is currently a Connecticut State Representative serving the 147th District of Connecticut.
