= Belfer =

Belfer may refer to

== People ==
- Arthur Belfer (1906–1993), American businessman
- James Belfer (b. 1987), American film producer
- Lauren Belfer, American writer
- Robert A. Belfer, American businessman

== Other uses ==
- Belfer Center for Science and International Affairs, a research center at Harvard University
- Belfer (TV series), a Polish TV series
