= Matt Blumenthal =

American politician from Connecticut

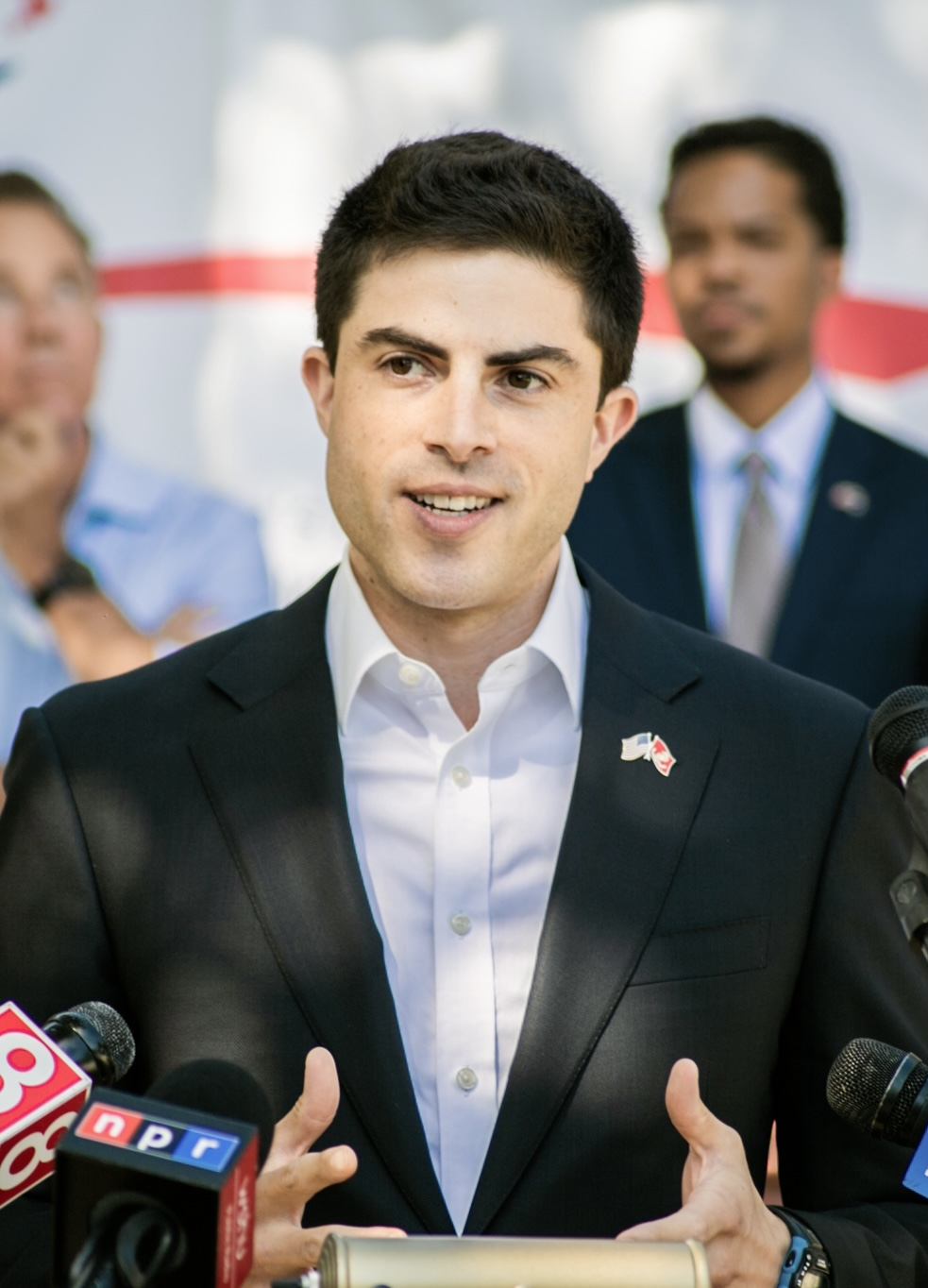
- Blumenthal in 2021

Member of the Connecticut House of Representatives from the 147th district
- Incumbent
- Assumed office January 9, 2019
- Preceded by: William Tong

Personal details
- Born: January 30, 1986 (age 40) Stamford, Connecticut, U.S.
- Party: Democratic
- Parent: Richard Blumenthal (father)
- Relatives: Peter L. Malkin (maternal grandfather); Lawrence Wien (great-grandfather); Scott D. Malkin (maternal uncle)
- Education: Harvard University (BA); Yale University (JD)

Military service
- Allegiance: United States
- Branch/service: United States Marine Corps
- Years of service: 2009–2013
- Rank: Captain
- Battles/wars: War in Afghanistan

Matthew S. Blumenthal (born January 30, 1986) is an American politician and attorney serving as a member of the Connecticut House of Representatives from the 147th district in Fairfield County.

== Early life and education ==
Blumenthal was born in Stamford, Connecticut and raised in Stamford and Greenwich, Connecticut, to then state representative Richard Blumenthal, and his wife, Cynthia Malkin. He received his undergraduate degree magna cum laude from Harvard College, majoring in history and literature. He received his Juris Doctor degree from Yale Law School.

== Military service ==
Blumenthal served as an infantry officer in the United States Marine Corps Reserve. He spent roughly two and a half years in active duty service, commanding a rifle platoon in Marjah, Afghanistan, with Charlie Company, First Battalion, Twenty-Fifth Marines, as part of Operation Enduring Freedom.

== Legal career ==
After graduating from Yale Law School, Blumenthal served as a judicial law clerk to Diane P. Wood, then the chief judge of the U.S. Court of Appeals for the Seventh Circuit.

Blumenthal is a trial attorney for the law firm Koskoff, Koskoff & Bieder. He was the legal architect and one of the lead attorneys representing families of victims of the Sandy Hook Elementary School shooting in their lawsuit against conspiracy theorist and radio personality Alex Jones, which achieved a $1.4 billion verdict on their behalf. He and his colleagues on the case team were the recipients of the 2023 Public Justice Trial Lawyer of the Year Award. He has been selected to the Connecticut Super Lawyers “Rising Stars” list since 2022.

Blumenthal previously served as a supervisor at the Peter Gruber Rule of Law Clinic at Yale Law School. In that role, he helped supervise and submit briefs to the U.S. Supreme Court and lower federal courts in cases against the Trump administration's travel ban and transgender military ban. He also led the team that produced a comprehensive guidance on critical interpretive and procedural questions regarding the 25th Amendment to the U.S. Constitution.

== Public service ==
In 2018, Blumenthal was elected to serve as state representative for the 147th District of the Connecticut General Assembly, winning 59 percent of the vote against Republican candidate Anzelmo Graziosi. He was endorsed by former president Barack Obama. In 2020, Blumenthal was re-elected, defeating Republican Dan Maymin 62 percent to 38 percent. In 2022, he was re-elected again, defeating Republican Abraham Viera by a margin of 60.2 percent to 39.8 percent.

Blumenthal is the current House chair of the Government Administration and Elections Committee, and a member of the Judiciary and Transportation Committees. He is the co-founder and co-chair of the General Assembly's Reproductive Rights Caucus.

In 2022, Blumenthal co-authored and led passage of the Connecticut Reproductive Freedom Defense Act, which protects residents, healthcare providers, and visiting patients from out-of-state lawsuits or prosecutions related to reproductive or gender-affirming health care that is legal in Connecticut. It was drafted and passed in anticipation of the U.S. Supreme Court's decision in Dobbs v. Jackson Women's Health Organization, which overruled Roe v. Wade. It has been called “the gold standard for pro-choice legislation in the post-Roe era,” as well as a “blueprint” and a “model for other . . . states that want to protect abortion access.” Blumenthal authored the law with Rep. Jillian Gilchrest, with whom he cofounded and co-chairs the General Assembly's Reproductive Rights Caucus. Sixteen other states and the District of Columbia have since enacted laws based on its provisions.

In 2023, Blumenthal co-authored and led passage of the state's first legislation allowing early voting. He led passage of a resolution for a constitutional amendment to allow no-excuse absentee voting, which will go before the voters for approval in November 2024. He had previously been at the forefront of the efforts to expand access to absentee and early voting in Connecticut, authoring absentee-ballot expansion legislation that passed in 2022. In 2023, he also co-authored and helped lead passage of the John R. Lewis Connecticut Voting Rights Act, the strongest state voting-rights legislation in the nation, as well as the first significant reform strengthening the state's Freedom of Information laws in 40 years.

Blumenthal has also authored and helped lead passage of the state's ban on ghost guns and 3D-printed guns, as well as helping pass laws ensuring safe storage of firearms. Additionally, he has helped author legislation to increase equity and reduce discrimination on juries, confront online harassment, stalking, and hate crimes, and update Connecticut's Emergency Risk Protection Order (Red-Flag) law.

== Electoral history ==
=== 2018 ===
Connecticut's 147th State house district election, 2018
Party	Candidate	Votes	%
Democratic	Matt Blumenthal	6,187	58.9%
Total	Anzelmo Graziosi	4,326	41.1%
Republican	Anzelmo Graziosi	4,153	39.5%
Independent Party	Anzelmo Graziosi	173	1.6%
Total votes		10,513	100.00%
Democratic hold			

=== 2020 ===
Connecticut's 147th State house district election, 2020
Party	Candidate	Votes	%
Democratic	Matt Blumenthal (incumbent)	8,451	62.0%
Republican	Dan Maymin	5,176	38.0%
Total votes		13,627	100.00%
Democratic hold			

=== 2022 ===
Connecticut's 147th State house district election, 2022
Party	Candidate	Votes	%
Democratic	Matt Blumenthal (incumbent)	5,265	60.2%
Republican	Abraham David Viera	3,482	39.8%
Total votes		8,747	100.00%
Democratic hold			

=== 2024 ===
Connecticut's 147th House of Representatives district election, 2024
Party	Candidate	Votes	%
Democratic	Matt Blumenthal (incumbent)	7,246	60.95%
Republican	Rodolfo Settimi	4,642	39.05%
Total votes		11,888	100.0%
