= 1990 Connecticut Attorney General election =

- November 6, 1990
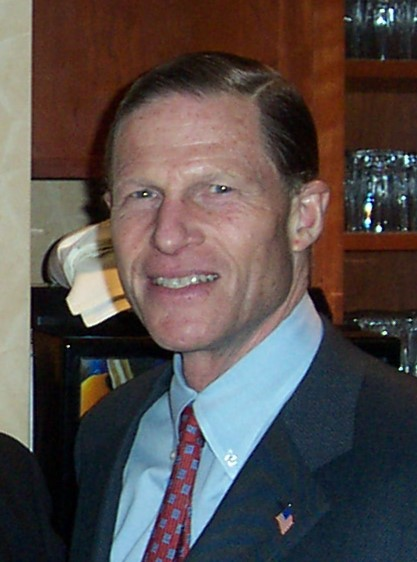

Nominee	Richard Blumenthal	E. Gaynor Brennan Jr.
Party	Democratic	Republican
Popular vote	572,972	395,289
Percentage	59.2%	40.8%
- Blumenthal: 50–60% 60–70% 70–80% 80–90% Brennan: 50–60% 60–70% 70–80%
Attorney General before election
Clarine Nardi Riddle
Democratic
Elected Attorney General
Richard Blumenthal
Democratic

The 1990 Connecticut Attorney General election took place on November 6, 1990, to elect the Attorney General of Connecticut. Incumbent Democratic Attorney General Clarine Nardi Riddle was appointed by Governor William O'Neill to fill the remainder of the term to which Joe Lieberman had been elected in 1986. Lieberman resigned on January 3, 1989, following his election to the U.S. Senate. Riddle did not seek election to a full term.

Democratic nominee and state senator Richard Blumenthal defeated Republican nominee E. Gaynor Brennan Jr.

== Democratic primary ==
=== Candidates ===
==== Nominee ====
- Richard Blumenthal, lawyer, state senator from the 27th district (1987–1991), former state representative from the 145th district (1984–1987), and former United States Attorney for the District of Connecticut (1977–1981)

==== Defeated at convention ====
- Jay B. Levin, state Representative from the 40th district.

== Republican primary ==
=== Candidates ===
==== Nominee ====
- E. Gaynor Brennan Jr, attorney and Stamford fire commissioner

== General election ==
=== Results ===
1990 Connecticut Attorney General election
Party	Candidate	Votes	%	±%
Democratic	Richard Blumenthal	572,972	59.18%	−5.5%
Republican	E. Gaynor Brennan Jr.	395,289	40.82%	+5.5%
Total votes		968,261	100.0%	
Democratic hold				

== See also ==
- Connecticut Attorney General
