= 1994 Connecticut Attorney General election =

- November 8, 1994
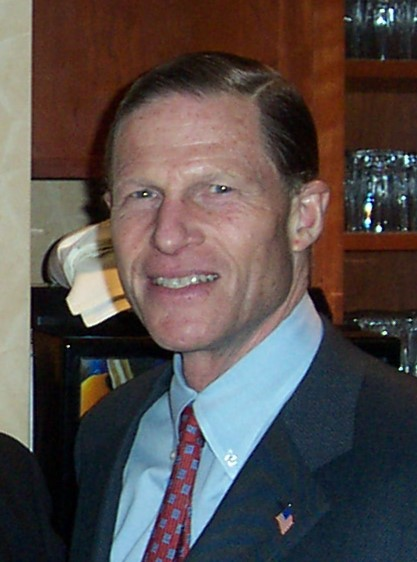

| Nominee | Richard Blumenthal | Richard E. Arnold |
| Party | Democratic | Republican |
| Alliance | A Connecticut Party |
| Popular vote | 679,313 | 344,627 |
| Percentage | 66.3% | 33.7% |
- Blumenthal: 50–60% 60–70% 70–80% 80–90% Arnold: 50–60% 60–70%
Attorney General before election
Richard Blumenthal
Democratic
Elected Attorney General
Richard Blumenthal
Democratic

The 1994 Connecticut Attorney General election took place on November 8, 1994, to elect the Attorney General of Connecticut. Incumbent Democratic Attorney General Richard Blumenthal won re-election to a second term, defeating Republican nominee Richard E. Arnold.

== Democratic primary ==
=== Candidates ===
==== Nominee ====
- Richard Blumenthal, incumbent attorney general (1991–2011)

== Republican primary ==
=== Candidates ===
==== Nominee ====
- Richard E. Arnold, nominee for attorney general in 1986

== Third-party candidates and independent candidates ==
=== A Connecticut Party ===
A Connecticut Party endorsed Blumenthal, giving him access to an additional ballot line. Blumenthal received just over a third of his total vote share under A Connecticut Party.

Official designee

- Richard Blumenthal, incumbent attorney general (1991–2011)

== General election ==
=== Results ===
1994 Connecticut Attorney General election
| Party | Candidate | Votes | % | ±% |
|---|---|---|---|---|
| Democratic | Richard Blumenthal | 446,434 | 43.60% | −15.59% |
| A Connecticut Party | Richard Blumenthal | 232,879 | 22.74% | N/A |
| Total | Richard Blumenthal (incumbent) | 679,313 | 66.34% | +7.16% |
| Republican | Richard E. Arnold | 344,627 | 33.66% | −7.16% |
| Total votes | | 1,023,940 | 100.0% | |
| Democratic hold | | | | |

=== By congressional district ===
Blumenthal won all six congressional district, including three that elected Republicans.

| District | Blumenthal | Arnold | Representative |
|---|---|---|---|
| 1st | 76% | 24% | Barbara Kennelly |
| 2nd | 71% | 29% | Sam Gejdenson |
| 3rd | 67% | 33% | Rosa DeLauro |
| 4th | 58% | 42% | Chris Shays |
| 5th | 58% | 42% | Gary Franks |
| 6th | 67% | 33% | Nancy Johnson |

== See also ==
- Connecticut Attorney General
