= Jon Ledecky =

American businessman (born 1958)

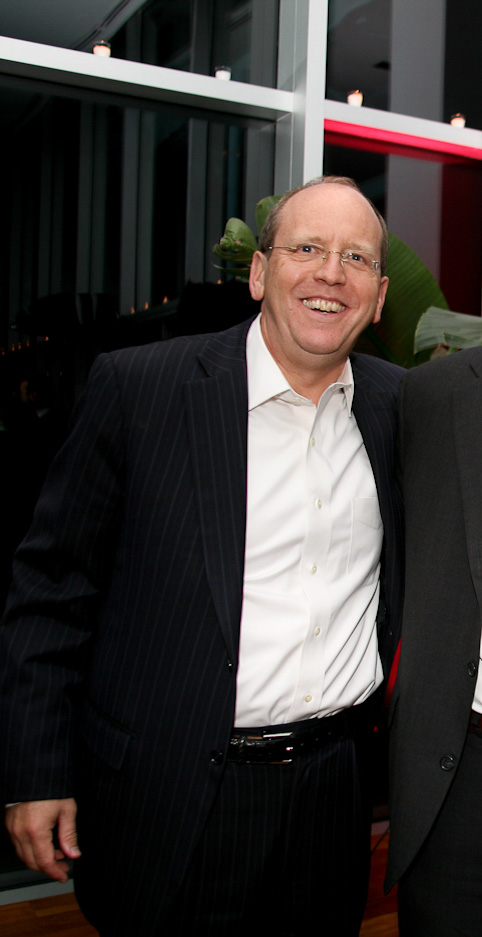
- Ledecky in 2012
- Born: Jonathan Joseph Ledecky; February 9, 1958 (age 68); New York City, U.S.
- Education: Harvard University
- Occupation: Businessman
- Relatives: Katie Ledecky (niece)

Jonathan Joseph Ledecky (born February 9, 1958) is an American businessman and a co-owner of the NHL team New York Islanders and their AHL affiliate Hamilton Hammers.

His niece is multiple Olympic gold medalist swimmer Katie Ledecky.

== Biography ==
Ledecky was born in 1958 in New York City, the son of a Czechoslovak immigrant who came to America eleven years prior to study English at Rutgers University. Growing up in Queens and Brooklyn, he became a New York Yankees fan. After moving in 1972 to Greenwich, Connecticut, Ledecky attended Greenwich High School. After high school, Ledecky studied business administration at Harvard University, continuing his reporter work at The Harvard Crimson and college radio station WHRB. Ledecky earned his bachelor's degree in 1979 and completed a Master of Business Administration in 1983, which was followed by a series of venture capital-type jobs. After being dismissed from Steelcase in 1994, Ledecky decided to open his own company in the office supplies business. Backed by a number of Harvard alumni, U.S. Office Products was founded in 1994, and had its initial public offering one year later. By the time Ledecky left U.S. Office Products in 1998, his fortune was estimated at $200 million.

=== Sports ownership ===
In 1998, Ledecky nearly purchased a share of the Cincinnati Reds before getting his bid matched by Carl Lindner, and also bid on the Los Angeles Dodgers. Eventually he partnered with America Online executive Ted Leonsis to found Lincoln Holdings, who purchased the National Hockey League's Washington Capitals and a minor share of the National Basketball Association's Washington Wizards. Ledecky still got interested in higher shares of sports franchises, partnering with Steve Stotland in 2000 to bid on the Montreal Canadiens (he lost out to Colorado businessman George Gillett Jr.). In 2001, Ledecky sold his 24-percent stake in Lincoln Holdings, originally worth $58 million, back to Leonsis for more than $70 million. Following an unsuccessful bid at the Oakland Athletics in 2002, Ledecky headed one of the groups intent on purchasing the Washington Nationals from Major League Baseball, eventually losing to Ted Lerner.

In October 2014, Ledecky and former Harvard roommate Scott D. Malkin entered a deal to purchase the New York Islanders from Charles Wang. They became minority owners during a two-year transition period before getting majority shares by 2016.

Sporting positions
Preceded by Charles Wang; Sanjay Kumar	New York Islanders owner 2016–present Served alongside: Scott D. Malkin	Incumbent
