= 1998 Connecticut Attorney General election =

- November 3, 1998
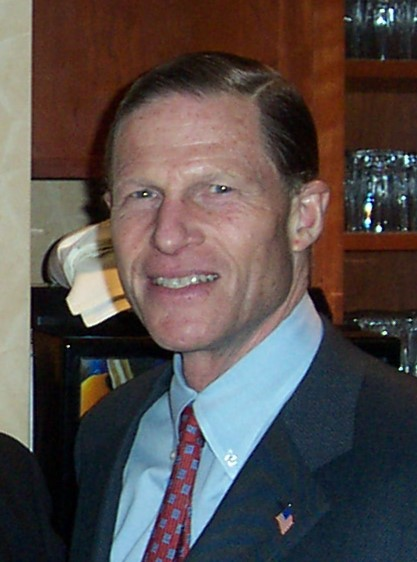

Nominee	Richard Blumenthal	Santa Mendoza
Party	Democratic	Republican
Popular vote	631,588	282,289
Percentage	68.6%	30.6%
- Blumenthal: 40–50% 50–60% 60–70% 70–80% 80–90% Mendoza: 50–60% 60–70%
Attorney General before election
Richard Blumenthal
Democratic
Elected Attorney General
Richard Blumenthal
Democratic

The 1998 Connecticut Attorney General election took place on November 3, 1998, to elect the Attorney General of Connecticut. Incumbent Democratic Attorney General Richard Blumenthal won re-election to a third term, defeating Republican nominee Santa Mendoza.

== Democratic primary ==
=== Candidates ===
==== Nominee ====
- Richard Blumenthal, incumbent attorney general (1991–2011)

== Republican primary ==
=== Candidates ===
==== Nominee ====
- Santa Mendoza, attorney

== Third-party candidates and independent candidates ==
=== Libertarian Party ===
- Richard J. Pober, attorney

== General election ==
=== Results ===
1998 Connecticut Attorney General election
Party	Candidate	Votes	%	±%
Democratic	Richard Blumenthal (incumbent)	631,588	68.55%	+2.21%
Republican	Santa Mendoza	282,289	30.64%	−3.02%
Libertarian	Richard J. Pober	7,537	0.82%	N/A
Total votes		921,414	100.0%	
Democratic hold				

=== By congressional district ===
Blumenthal won all six congressional districts, including two that elected Republicans.

District	Blumenthal	Mendoza	Representative
1st	75%	25%	Barbara Kennelly (105th Congress)
1st	75%	25%	John Larson (106th Congress)
2nd	72%	27%	Sam Gejdenson
3rd	71%	28%	Rosa DeLauro
4th	63%	36%	Chris Shays
5th	62%	37%	James Maloney
6th	67%	32%	Nancy Johnson

== See also ==
- Connecticut Attorney General
