= Clarine Nardi Riddle =

Attorney general of Connecticut, US, in 1989–1991

22nd Attorney General of Connecticut
- In office January 3, 1989 – January 9, 1991
- Nominated by: William O'Neill
- Preceded by: Joe Lieberman
- Succeeded by: Richard Blumenthal

Personal details
- Born: April 23, 1949 (age 77) Clinton, Indiana, U.S.
- Education: Indiana University Maurer School of Law; Indiana University
- Website: www.kasowitz.com/people/all/clarine-nardi-riddle/

Clarine Nardi Riddle (born April 23, 1949) is an American politician who served as attorney general of Connecticut, United States, from 1989 to 1991, the only woman to have held that position.

== Education ==
Riddle earned a degree with honors in mathematics at Indiana University in 1971. In 1974, she earned a Juris Doctor degree from the Indiana University School of Law. She received an honorary Doctor of Humane Letters from Saint Joseph College.

== Career ==
In 1979 Riddle was appointed assistant counsel to the majority Leader of the Connecticut Senate. In 1980, she was appointed New Haven's deputy corporation counsel. From 1983 to 1985, she was counsel to the attorney general, Joseph I. Lieberman. In 1986, Lieberman appointed her deputy attorney general. Lieberman resigned following his election to the United States Senate. On December 22, 1988, Governor William O'Neill announced that he would appoint Riddle as attorney general to fill the remainder of the term to which Lieberman had been elected in 1986. She was sworn in on January 3, 1989, and served until January 9, 1991. She was the first female attorney general to argue in front of the Supreme Court of the United States. She was later a judge of the Connecticut Superior Court.

She was chief of staff for Lieberman from 2003 until he left the Senate in 2013.

She has held numerous positions in both government and the private sector including senior vice president and general counsel of the National Multi Housing Council.

In 2013, Riddle was a counsel in the Washington, DC, office of Kasowitz, Benson, Torres & Friedman.

She co-founded the political organization, No Labels, and was on the Constitutional Democracy board of directors at the Indiana University Maurer School of Law Center. She is a member of the Board at the Connecticut Policy Institute and holds a seat on the board of advisors of The National Bureau of Asian Research.

Riddle is admitted to practice before the U.S. Supreme Court, the U.S. District Court, District of Connecticut, and U.S. Court of Appeals, Second Circuit. She is also admitted to the Connecticut and D.C. bars.

== Recognition ==
- In 2020, Riddle was awarded a 2020 Women, Influence & Power in Law Award for Lifetime Achievement by Corporate Counsel.

== See also ==
- List of female state attorneys general in the United States

Legal offices
Preceded by Joe Lieberman	Attorney General of Connecticut; 1989–1991	Succeeded by Richard Blumenthal
