= 2006 Connecticut Attorney General election =

- November 7, 2006
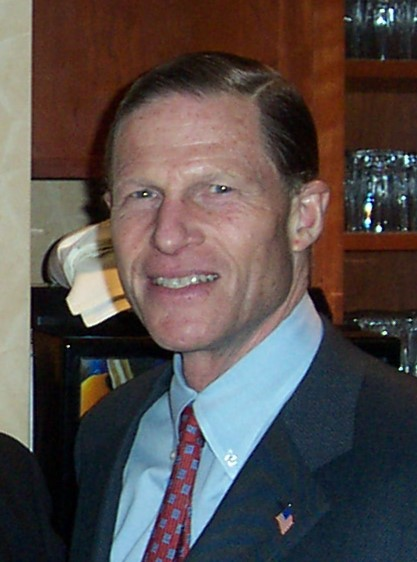

Nominee	Richard Blumenthal	Robert Farr
Party	Democratic	Republican
Popular vote	782,235	256,018
Percentage	74.1%	24.3%
- Blumenthal: 50–60% 60–70% 70–80% 80–90% >90% Farr: 50–60%
Attorney General before election
Richard Blumenthal
Democratic
Elected Attorney General
Richard Blumenthal
Democratic

The 2006 Connecticut Attorney General election took place on November 7, 2006, to elect the Attorney General of Connecticut. Incumbent Democratic Attorney General Richard Blumenthal won re-election to an unprecedented fifth term, defeating Republican nominee and state representative Robert Farr, who lost every single county in the state and only carried the staunchly conservative town of New Canaan.

== Democratic primary ==
=== Candidates ===
==== Nominee ====
- Richard Blumenthal, incumbent attorney general (1991–2011)

== Republican primary ==
=== Candidates ===
==== Nominee ====
- Robert Farr, lawyer and state representative from the 19th district (1981–2007)

== Third-party candidates and independent candidates ==
=== Green Party ===
- Nancy Burton, candidate for state representative in 2004 and 2006

== General election ==
=== Results ===
2006 Connecticut Attorney General election
Party	Candidate	Votes	%	±%
Democratic	Richard Blumenthal (incumbent)	782,235	74.08%	+8.43%
Republican	Robert Farr	256,018	24.25%	−10.10%
Green	Nancy Burton	17,684	1.67%	N/A
Total votes		1,055,957	100.0%	
Democratic hold				

==== By congressional district ====
Blumenthal won all five congressional districts, including one that elected a Republican.

District	Blumenthal	Farr	Representative
1st	77%	21%	John B. Larson
2nd	76%	23%	Rob Simmons (109th Congress)
2nd	76%	23%	Joe Courtney (110th Congress)
3rd	79%	20%	Rosa DeLauro
4th	68%	30%	Christopher Shays
5th	71%	28%	Nancy L. Johnson (109th Congress)
5th	71%	28%	Chris Murphy (110th Congress)

== See also ==
- Connecticut Attorney General
