= 2002 Connecticut Attorney General election =

- November 5, 2002
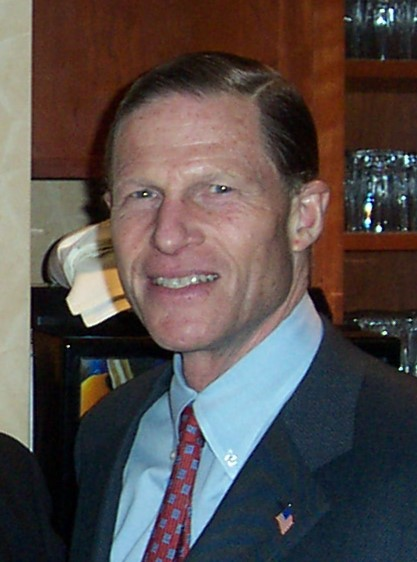

Nominee	Richard Blumenthal	Martha Dean
Party	Democratic	Republican
Popular vote	632,351	330,874
Percentage	65.7%	34.4%
- Blumenthal: 50–60% 60–70% 70–80% 80–90% Dean: 50–60% 60–70%
Attorney General before election
Richard Blumenthal
Democratic
Elected Attorney General
Richard Blumenthal
Democratic

The 2002 Connecticut Attorney General election took place on November 5, 2002, to elect the Attorney General of Connecticut. Incumbent Democratic Attorney General Richard Blumenthal won re-election to a fourth term, easily defeating Republican nominee Martha Dean.

== Democratic primary ==
=== Candidates ===
==== Nominee ====
- Richard Blumenthal, incumbent attorney general (1991–2011)

== Republican primary ==
=== Candidates ===
==== Nominee ====
- Martha Dean, attorney

== General election ==
=== Results ===
2002 Connecticut Attorney General election
Party	Candidate	Votes	%	±%
Democratic	Richard Blumenthal (incumbent)	632,351	65.65%	−2.90%
Republican	Martha Dean	330,874	34.35%	+3.71%
Total votes		963,225	100.0%	
Democratic hold				

=== By congressional district ===
Blumenthal won all five congressional districts, including three that elected Republicans.

District	Blumenthal	Dean	Representative
1st	69%	31%	John Larson
2nd	67%	33%	Rob Simmons
3rd	71%	29%	Rosa DeLauro
4th	60%	40%	Chris Shays
5th	61%	39%	Nancy Johnson

== See also ==
- Connecticut Attorney General
