= Lawrence Wien =

American lawyer

- Born: Lawrence Arthur Wien; May 30, 1905; New York City, New York, U.S.
- Died: December 10, 1988 (aged 83); Westport, Connecticut, U.S.
- Education: Columbia University (AB, JD)
- Occupations: Attorney real estate investor
- Known for: co-founder of Wien & Malkin
- Spouse: Mae Levy (m. 1929; died 1986) Ruth Kupper (m. 1987)
- Children: 2
- Relatives: Peter L. Malkin (son-in-law); Matt Blumenthal (great grandson)

Lawrence Arthur Wien (May 30, 1905 – December 10, 1988) was an American lawyer, philanthropist, and real estate investor. Wien pioneered the concept of real estate syndicates.

== Early life ==
Wien was born to a Jewish family in New York City. He had four siblings: Mortimer E. Wien, Sidney A. Wien, Leonard Wien, and Ms. Bernard T. Hein. In 1925, Wien graduated with a B.A. from Columbia College, where he was a member of the Philolexian Society. In 1927, he graduated with a J.D. from Columbia Law School.

== Career ==
In 1928, he co-founded the law firm Wien Lane & Malkin now Wien and Malkin, which became a leading national law firm specializing in real estate law. In 1931, he ventured into real estate and, along with three partners who invested $2,000 apiece, bought a small apartment house in Harlem. In the 1930s, using his legal background, Wien pioneered the concept of real estate syndicates, making direct ownership of income property accessible to groups of individual investors for the first time.

In 1958, his son-in-law Peter L. Malkin became a partner in his law firm, which was renamed Wien, Lane & Malkin (now Wien and Malkin). His syndicates purchased, or controlled through long-term ground leases, many of New York City's most prominent landmarks, including the Empire State Building (which he bought with partner Harry Helmsley in 1961 from Henry Crown), the Equitable Building, the Graybar Building, the Fisk Building, the Garment Centre Capitol Building, the Fifth Avenue Building, the Lincoln Building as well as many prominent hotels including the Plaza Hotel, the Taft Hotel, Hotel St. Moritz, the Lexington Hotel, and the Hotel Governor Clinton.

Wien also participated in transactions in Newark, Palm Beach, Philadelphia, Los Angeles, Minneapolis, and Las Vegas. From 1933 to 1935, he was an official of the City Fusion Party and worked to elect Mayor Fiorello La Guardia. Wien & Malkin was renamed Malkin Holdings after the spinoff and IPO of Empire State Realty Trust (NYSE: ESRT), a publicly traded real estate investment trust.

== Philanthropy ==
Wien was a major benefactor of the arts and education. In 1956, he commissioned the statue of Associate Justice Louis Brandeis of the United States Supreme Court which sits on the campus of Brandeis University. In 1958, he donated $8.5 million to Brandeis University to endow the Wien International Scholarship which pays the tuition, room & board, and travel expenses for 50 foreign students per year. In 1959 he created a national scholarship at Columbia Law School; Wien contributed over $20 million during his life to his alma mater Columbia including $6 million for the construction of a new stadium at Baker Field, now known as the Robert K. Kraft Field at Lawrence A. Wien Stadium. In 1969, he donated $1.2 million to the Lincoln Center for the Performing Arts where he served as vice chairman and a trustee for 20 years.

From 1960 to 1963, Wien served as president of the Federation of Jewish Philanthropies. From 1964 to 1970, he served as trustee of Columbia University and in 1981, was awarded its Alexander Hamilton Medal, the highest honor given to an alumnus. From 1957 to 1984, Wien served as a Trustee of Brandeis University, and became its Chairman of the Board of Trustees.

== Personal life ==
Wien was married twice. In 1929, he married Mae Levy; she died in 1986. They had two daughters: Enid W. Morse and Isabel W. Malkin. In 1987, he married Ruth Kupper. In 1988, Wien died of prostate cancer at his home in Westport, Connecticut. His granddaughter, Cynthia Allison Malkin, is married to Richard Blumenthal who was elected as United States Senator of Connecticut in 2011.

== Recognition ==
=== Honorary degrees ===
- Doctor of Laws: Columbia University, Brandeis University, Long Island University, Fairfield University, St. John's University
- Other honorary degrees: Canisius College and The Juilliard School

=== Named for Wien ===
- Wien Hall: a dormitory at Columbia University
- Wien International Scholarship Program: Scholarship instituted for international students at Brandeis University; over 800 students have attended Brandeis on such scholarships since 1958
- The main reading room at Butler Library at Columbia University
- Lawrence A. Wien Stadium: home of the Columbia University Lions football team
- Wien Soccer Stadium at Columbia University
- Wien Professorship of Real Property Law at Columbia Law School
- Wien National Scholarship Program at Columbia Law School, awarded annually to students from each of the 11 Federal Circuit Court jurisdictions
- Wien Faculty Building at Brandeis University
- Wien Walk: Pathway running from the 60th Street entrance of Central Park to the Central Park Zoo in Manhattan
- Wien Walk 2 at Lincoln Center
- Columbia Wien Prize in Social Responsibility
- The Lawrence A. Wien Center for Dance and Theater (890 Broadway)
