= Richard Blumenthal =

American lawyer and politician (born 1946)

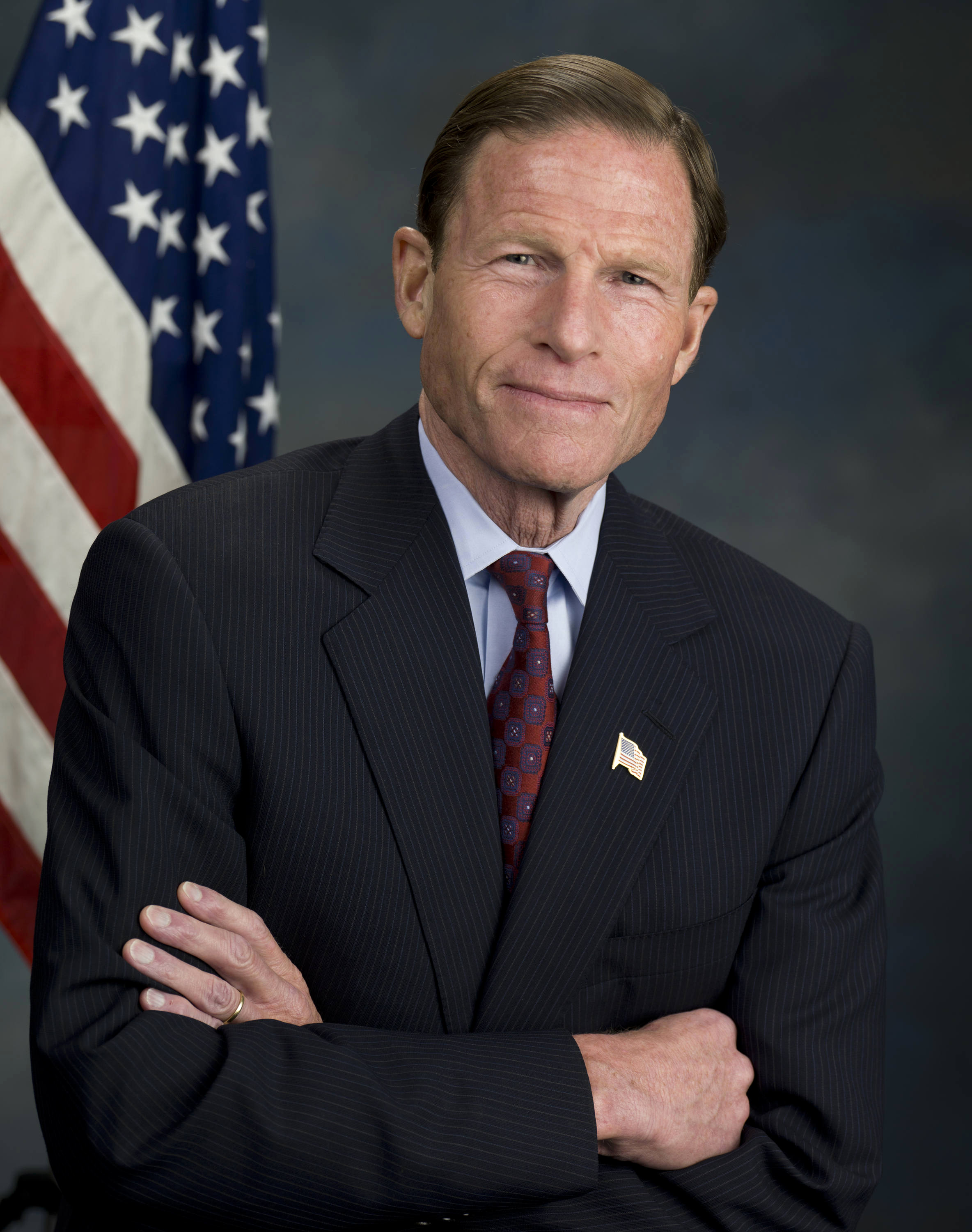
- Blumenthal in 2011

Ranking Member of the Senate Veterans' Affairs Committee
- Incumbent
- Assumed office January 3, 2025
- Preceded by: Jerry Moran

United States Senator from Connecticut
- Incumbent
- Assumed office January 3, 2011 Serving with Chris Murphy
- Preceded by: Chris Dodd

23rd Attorney General of Connecticut
- In office January 9, 1991 – January 5, 2011
- Governor: Lowell Weicker; John Rowland; Jodi Rell
- Preceded by: Clarine Nardi Riddle
- Succeeded by: George Jepsen

Member of the Connecticut Senate from the 27th district
- In office November 4, 1987 – January 3, 1991
- Preceded by: Anthony Truglia
- Succeeded by: George Jepsen

Member of the Connecticut House of Representatives from the 145th district
- In office April 11, 1984 – November 4, 1987
- Preceded by: Anthony Truglia
- Succeeded by: Nicholas Pavia

United States Attorney for the District of Connecticut
- In office June 22, 1977 – November 1, 1981
- President: Jimmy Carter; Ronald Reagan
- Preceded by: Peter Dorsey
- Succeeded by: Alan Nevas

Personal details
- Born: February 13, 1946 (age 80) New York City, U.S.
- Party: Democratic
- Spouse: Cynthia Malkin (m. 1982)
- Children: 4, including Matt
- Relatives: David Blumenthal (brother); Peter L. Malkin (father-in-law); Scott D. Malkin (brother-in-law)
- Education: Harvard University (BA); Trinity College, Cambridge (attended); Yale University (JD)
- Website: Senate website Campaign website

Military service
- Branch: United States Marine Corps; Marine Corps Reserve
- Service years: 1970–1976
- Rank: Sergeant
- Blumenthal's voice Blumenthal supporting the Inflation Reduction Act. Recorded August 6, 2022

Richard Blumenthal (/ˈbluːmənθɑːl/ BLOO-mən-thahl; born February 13, 1946) is an American politician and attorney serving as the senior United States senator from Connecticut. A member of the Democratic Party, he has been a member of the Senate since 2011. Blumenthal previously served as U.S. attorney for the District of Connecticut, as a member of the Connecticut General Assembly, and as the 23rd Connecticut attorney general.

Blumenthal graduated from Harvard University, where he was chair of The Harvard Crimson. He then studied for a year at Trinity College, Cambridge, before attending Yale Law School, where he was editor-in-chief of the Yale Law Journal.

From 1970 to 1976, Blumenthal served in the United States Marine Corps Reserve, attaining the rank of sergeant. After graduating from Yale Law School, he passed the bar and served as administrative assistant and law clerk for several Washington, D.C., figures. He was U.S. attorney for the District of Connecticut from 1977 to 1981. In the early 1980s, he worked in private law practice, including as volunteer counsel for the NAACP Legal Defense Fund.

Blumenthal served one term in the Connecticut House of Representatives, from 1985 to 1987. He was elected to the Connecticut Senate in 1986 and began service in 1987. In 1990, Blumenthal was elected Attorney General of Connecticut; he served in that capacity for 20 years. Blumenthal announced his 2010 run for the U.S. Senate after incumbent senator Chris Dodd announced his retirement. He defeated Republican nominee Linda McMahon, a professional wrestling magnate, with 55% of the vote. After Joe Lieberman retired from the Senate in 2013, Blumenthal became Connecticut's senior senator. He was reelected in 2016 and 2022. He is expected to be the oldest serving Democratic U.S. senator when Dick Durbin retires in 2027.

== Early life and education ==
Richard Blumenthal (Note: Blumenthal's middle initial has sometimes been reported as "A."' and has sometimes been reported as "L.") was born into a Jewish family in Brooklyn, New York City, the son of Jane (née Rosenstock) and Martin Blumenthal. At age 17, Martin Blumenthal immigrated to the United States from Frankfurt, Germany; Jane was raised in Omaha, Nebraska, graduated from Radcliffe College, and became a social worker. Martin Blumenthal had a career in financial services and became president of a commodities trading firm. Jane's father, Fred "Fritz" Rosenstock, raised cattle, and as youths Blumenthal and his brother often visited their grandfather's farm. Blumenthal's brother David Blumenthal is a doctor and health care policy expert who became president of the Commonwealth Fund.

Blumenthal attended Riverdale Country School in the Riverdale section of the Bronx. He then attended Harvard College, from which he graduated in 1967 with an A.B. degree magna cum laude in government and membership in Phi Beta Kappa. As an undergraduate, he was editorial chairman of The Harvard Crimson. Blumenthal was a summer intern reporter for The Washington Post in the London Bureau. He was selected for a Fiske Fellowship, which allowed him to study at the University of Cambridge's Trinity College in England.

In 1973, Blumenthal received his J.D. degree from Yale Law School, where he was editor-in-chief of the Yale Law Journal. At Yale, he was the classmate of future president Bill Clinton and future secretary of state Hillary Clinton. One of his co-editors of the Yale Law Journal was future United States Secretary of Labor Robert Reich. He was also a classmate of future Supreme Court justice Clarence Thomas and future radio host Michael Medved.

== Military service and controversy ==
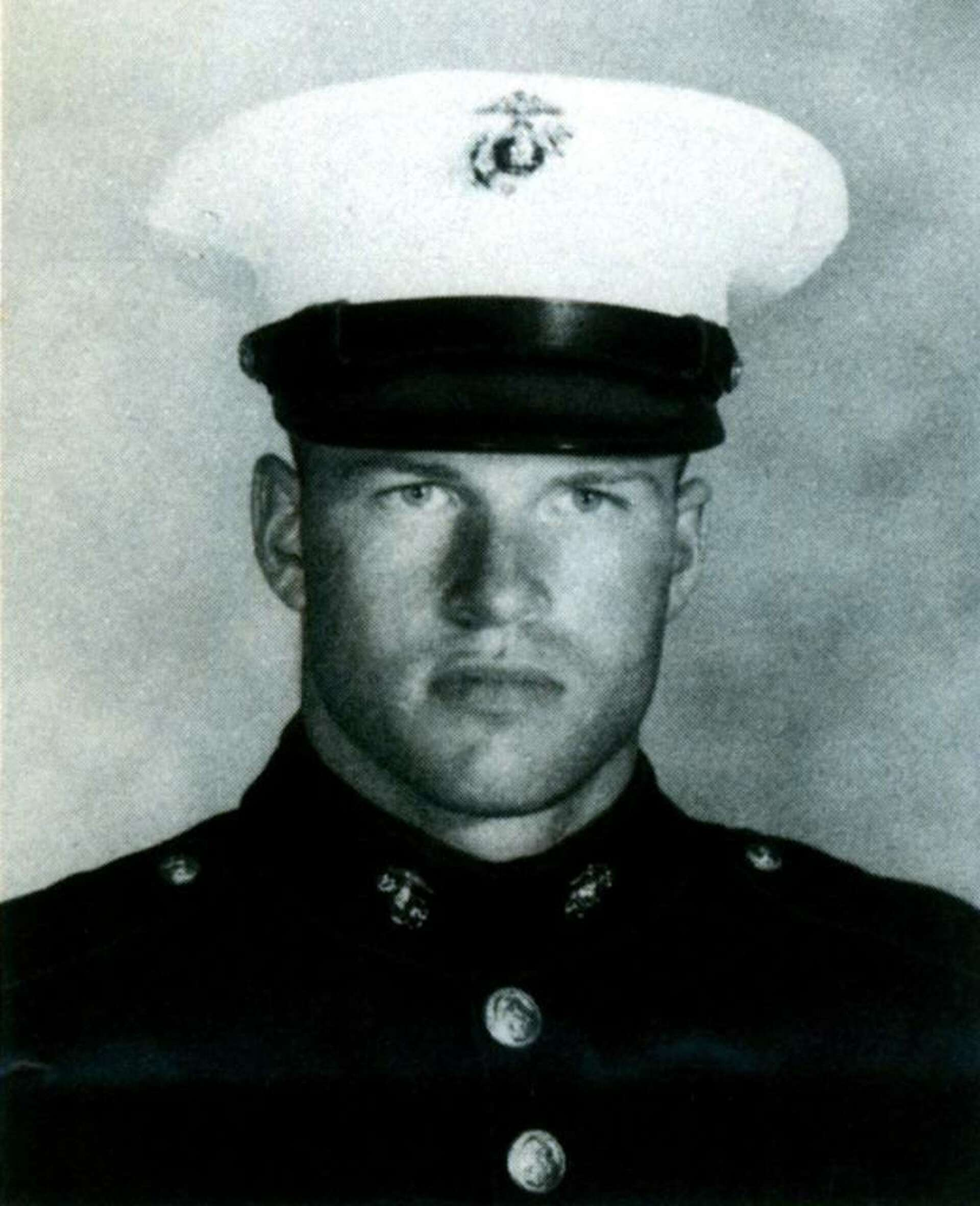
Blumenthal in the U.S. Marine Corps

Blumenthal received five draft deferments during the Vietnam War. At first, he received educational deferments; later, he received deferments based on his occupation. In April 1970, he enlisted in the United States Marine Corps Reserve, which, as The New York Times noted, "virtually guaranteed that he would not be sent to Vietnam". He served in units stationed in Washington, D.C., and Connecticut from 1970 to 1976, attaining the rank of sergeant.

During his 2010 Senate campaign, news reports that Blumenthal claimed he had served in Vietnam created a controversy. The New York Times reported that Blumenthal misspoke on at least one occasion by saying he had served with the military "in Vietnam". Video emerged of him speaking to a group of veterans and supporters in March 2008 in Norwalk, saying, in reference to supporting troops returning from Iraq and Afghanistan, "We have learned something important since the days that I served in Vietnam." On other occasions, he described his military service accurately. At a 2008 ceremony in Shelton, Connecticut, he said, "I served during the Vietnam era... I remember the taunts, the insults, sometimes even physical abuse."

Blumenthal denied having intentionally misled voters, but acknowledged having occasionally "misspoken" about his service record. He later apologized to voters for remarks about his military service that he said had not been "clear or precise".

== Early career ==
Blumenthal served as an administrative assistant to Senator Abraham A. Ribicoff, as an aide to Daniel P. Moynihan when Moynihan was Assistant to President Richard Nixon, and as a law clerk to Judge Jon O. Newman of the U.S. District Court of the District of Connecticut and to Supreme Court Justice Harry A. Blackmun.

Blumenthal was a partner in the law firm of Cummings & Lockwood, and subsequently in the law firm of Silver, Golub & Sandak. In December 1982, while still at Cummings & Lockwood, he created and chaired the Citizens Crime Commission of Connecticut, a private, nonprofit organization. From 1981 to 1986, he was a volunteer counsel for the NAACP Legal Defense Fund.

At age 31, Blumenthal was appointed United States Attorney for the District of Connecticut, serving from 1977 to 1981. As the chief federal prosecutor of that state, he successfully prosecuted many major cases involving drug traffickers, organized crime, white collar criminals, civil rights violators, consumer fraud, and environmental pollution.

In 1984, when he was 38, Blumenthal was elected to the Connecticut House of Representatives, representing the 145th district. In 1987, he won a special election to fill a vacancy in the 27th district of the Connecticut Senate. Blumenthal served in the Connecticut Senate until 1990.

In the 1980s, Blumenthal testified in the state legislature in favor of abolishing Connecticut's death penalty statute. He did so after representing Joseph Green Brown, a Florida death row inmate who was found to have been wrongly convicted. Blumenthal succeeded in staving off Brown's execution just 15 hours before it was scheduled to take place, and gained a new trial for Brown.

== Attorney General of Connecticut (1991–2011) ==
Blumenthal served as attorney general of Connecticut from 1991 to 2010.

=== Tenure ===
==== Pequot land annexation bid ====
In May 1995, Blumenthal and the state of Connecticut filed lawsuits challenging a decision by the Department of the Interior to approve a bid by the federally recognized Mashantucket Pequot for annexation of 165 acres of land in the towns of Ledyard, North Stonington and Preston. The Pequot were attempting to have the land placed in a federal trust, a legal designation to provide them with land for their sovereign control, as long years of colonization had left them landless. Blumenthal argued that the Interior Department's decision in support of this action was "fatally, legally flawed, and unfair" and that "it would unfairly remove land from the tax rolls of the surrounding towns and bar local control over how the land is used, while imposing [a] tremendous burden." The tribe announced the withdrawal of the land annexation petition in February 2002.

==== Interstate air pollution ====
In 1997, Blumenthal and Governor John G. Rowland petitioned the United States Environmental Protection Agency (EPA) to address interstate air pollution problems created from Midwest and southeastern sources. The petition was filed in accordance with Section 126 of the Clean Air Act, which allows a state to request pollution reductions from out-of-state sources that contribute significantly to its air quality problems.

In 2003, Blumenthal and the attorneys general of eight other states (New York, Maine, Maryland, Massachusetts, New Hampshire, New Jersey, Rhode Island, and Vermont) filed a federal lawsuit against the Bush administration for "endangering air quality by gutting a critical component of the federal Clean Air Act." The suit alleged that changes in the act would have exempted thousands of industrial air pollution sources from the act's New Source Review provision and that the new rules and regulations would lead to an increase in air pollution.

==== Tobacco ====
While attorney general, Blumenthal was one of the leaders of a 46-state lawsuit against the tobacco industry, which alleged that the companies involved had deceived the public about the dangers of smoking. He argued that the state of Connecticut should be reimbursed for Medicaid expenses related to smoking. In 1998, the tobacco companies reached a $246 billion national settlement, giving the 46 states involved 25 years of reimbursement payments. Connecticut's share of the settlement was estimated at $3.6 billion.

In December 2007, Blumenthal filed suit against RJ Reynolds, alleging that a 2007 Camel advertising spread in Rolling Stone magazine used cartoons in violation of the master tobacco settlement, which prohibited the use of cartoons in cigarette advertising because they entice children and teenagers to smoke. The company paid the state of Connecticut $150,000 to settle the suit and agreed to end the advertising campaign.

==== Microsoft lawsuit ====
In May 1998, Blumenthal and the attorneys general of 19 other states and the District of Columbia filed an anti-trust lawsuit against Microsoft, accusing it of abusing its monopoly power to stifle competition. The suit, which centered on Microsoft's Windows 98 operating system and its contractual restrictions imposed on personal computer manufacturers to tie the operating system to its Internet Explorer browser, was eventually merged with a federal case brought by the United States Department of Justice (DOJ) under Attorney General Janet Reno.

A 2000 landmark federal court decision ruled that Microsoft had violated antitrust laws, and the court ordered that the company be broken up. In 2001, the federal appeals court agreed, but rather than break up the company, it sent the case to a new judge to hold hearings and determine appropriate remedies. Remedies were later proposed by Blumenthal and eight other attorneys general; these included requiring that Microsoft license an unbundled version of Windows in which middleware and operating system code were not commingled.

In 2001, the Bush administration's DOJ settled with Microsoft in an agreement criticized by many states and other industry experts as insufficient. In November 2002, a federal court ruling imposed those same remedies. In August 2007, Blumenthal and five other states and the District of Columbia filed a report alleging that the federal settlement with Microsoft and court-imposed Microsoft remedies had failed to adequately reduce Microsoft's monopoly.

==== Stanley Works ====
On May 10, 2002, Blumenthal and Connecticut State Treasurer Denise L. Nappier helped to stop the hostile takeover of New Britain-based Stanley Works, a major Connecticut employer, by filing a lawsuit alleging that the move to reincorporate in Bermuda based on a shareholder's vote of May 9 was "rife with voting irregularities." The agreement to temporarily halt the move was signed by New Britain Superior Court Judge Marshall Berger. On June 3 Blumenthal referred the matter to the U.S. Securities and Exchange Commission (SEC) for further investigation and on June 25 he testified before the U.S. House Committee on Ways and Means that "Longtime American corporations with operations in other countries can dodge tens of millions of dollars in federal taxes by the device of reincorporating in another country" by "simply [filing] incorporation papers in a country with friendly tax laws, open a post-office box and hold an annual meeting there" and that Stanley Works, along with "Cooper Industries, Seagate Technologies, Ingersoll-Rand and PricewaterhouseCoopers Consulting, to name but a few, have also become pseudo-foreign corporations for the sole purpose of saving tax dollars." Blumenthal said, "Corporations proposing to reincorporate to Bermuda, such as Stanley, often tell shareholders that there is no material difference in the law", but said that this was not the case and was misleading to their shareholders. To rectify this situation he championed the Corporate Patriot Enforcement Act to close tax loopholes.

==== Tomasso Group and Rowland corruption ====
Blumenthal was involved in a series of lawsuits against associates of Connecticut governor Rowland and the various entities of the Tomasso Group over Tomasso's bribing of state officials, including Rowland, in exchange for the awarding of lucrative state contracts. Blumenthal subpoenaed Tomasso Brothers Inc.; Tomasso Brothers Construction Co.; TBI Construction Co. LLC; Tunxis Plantation Country Club; Tunxis Management Co.; Tunxis Management Co. II; and Tenergy Water LLC (all part of the Tomasso Group). Lawyers for the Tomasso Group argued that the attorney general had no special power to look into the operations of private firms under whistleblower law as no actual whistleblowers had come forward and all incriminating testimony was in related federal cases. Connecticut law requires the attorney general to both be the attorney for the state and investigate the state government's misdeeds, and the rules governing the office did not adequately address this inherent conflict of interest. The state's case against the Tomasso Group failed but federal investigations ended in prison sentences for the Group's president, for Rowland, and for a number of his associates. The Tomasso Group stopped bidding on state contracts to avoid a substantial legal challenge from Blumenthal under newly written compliance statutes.

==== Charter schools lawsuit ====
In September 1999, Blumenthal announced a lawsuit against Robin Barnes, the president and treasurer of New Haven-based charter school the Village Academy, for serious financial mismanagement of the state-subsidized charitable organization. Citing common law, the suit sought to recover money misspent and serious damages resulting from Barnes's alleged breach of duty.

In a Connecticut Supreme Court decision, Blumenthal v. Barnes (2002), a unanimous court determined that the state attorney general could act using only the powers specifically authorized by the state legislature, and that since the attorney general's jurisdiction is defined by statute rather than common law, Blumenthal lacked the authority to cite common law as the basis for filing suit against Barnes. Despite this ruling, Blumenthal announced that he intended to pursue a separate 2000 lawsuit against the school's trustees filed on behalf of the State Department of Education.

==== Regional transmission organization ====
In 2003 Blumenthal, former Massachusetts Attorney General Tom Reilly, Rhode Island Attorney General Patrick C. Lynch, and consumer advocates from Connecticut, Maine, and New Hampshire opposed "the formation of a regional transmission organization (RTO) that would merge three Northeast and mid-Atlantic power operators, called Independent Service Operators (ISOs), into a single super-regional RTO." In a press release, he said, "This fatally flawed RTO proposal will raise rates, reduce accountability and reward market manipulation. It will increase the power and profits of transmission operators with an immediate $40 million price tag for consumers." The opposition was due to a report authored by Synapse Energy Economics, a Cambridge-based energy consulting firm, that alleged that consumers would be worse off under the merger.

==== Gina Kolb lawsuit ====
In 2004, Blumenthal sued Computer Plus Center of East Hartford and its owner, Gina Kolb, on behalf of the state. It was alleged that CPC overcharged $50 per computer, $500,000 in total, on a three-year, $17.2 million contract to supply computers to the state. Blumenthal sued for $1.75 million. Kolb was arrested in 2004 and charged with first-degree larceny. Kolb later countersued, claiming the state had grossly abused its power. Kolb was initially awarded $18.3 million in damages, but Blumenthal appealed the decision and the damages initially awarded were reduced to $1.83 million. Superior Court judge Barry Stevens described the jury's initial award of $18.3 million as a "shocking injustice" and said it was "influenced by partiality or mistake."

==== Big East and ACC ====
Blumenthal played a pivotal role in the expansion of the Atlantic Coast Conference and the departures of Boston College, Miami, and Virginia Tech from the Big East. He led efforts by the Big East football schools (Virginia Tech, Rutgers, Pittsburgh, and West Virginia) in legal proceedings against the Atlantic Coast Conference, the University of Miami and Boston College, accusing them of improper disclosure of confidential information and of conspiring to dismantle the Big East. According to Blumenthal, the case was pursued because "the future of the Big East Conference was at risk—the stakes huge for both state taxpayers and the university's good name." The suits cost the schools involved $2.2 million in the first four months of litigation. The lawsuit against the ACC was initially dismissed on jurisdictional grounds but was subsequently refiled. A declaratory judgment by the Supreme Judicial Court of Massachusetts exonerated Boston College in the matter. Virginia Tech accepted an invitation from the ACC and withdrew from the suit to remove itself from the awkward position of suing its new conference. An out-of-court $5 million settlement was eventually reached, which included a $1 million exit fee that Boston College was required to pay the Big East under the league's constitution.

==== Interstate 84 ====
On October 2, 2006, Blumenthal launched an investigation of a botched reconstruction project of Interstate 84 in Waterbury and Cheshire. The original contractor for the job, L.G. DeFelice, went out of business and it was later revealed that hundreds of storm drains had been improperly installed. Blumenthal subsequently announced lawsuits against L.G. DeFelice and the Maguire Group, the engineering firm that inspected the project. United States Fidelity & Guaranty, the insurer behind the performance bond for the I-84 construction, agreed to pay $17.5 million to settle the claims. Under the agreement, the state of Connecticut retained the right to sue L.G. DeFelice for additional funds. In 2009, the bonding company agreed to pay an additional $4.6 million settlement, bringing the total award to $22.1 million ($30,000 more than the repair costs).

==== Lyme disease guidelines investigation ====
In November 2006, Blumenthal tried, as Paul A. Offit described it, "to legislate a disease, Chronic Lyme, into existence". He launched an antitrust investigation into the Infectious Diseases Society of America's (IDSA's) 2006 guidelines regarding the treatment of Lyme disease. Responding to concerns from chronic Lyme disease advocacy groups, Blumenthal claimed the IDSA guidelines would "severely constrict choices and legitimate diagnosis and treatment options for patients." The medical validity of the IDSA guidelines was not challenged, and a journalist writing in Nature Medicine suggested some IDSA members may not have disclosed potential conflicts of interest, while a Forbes piece described Blumenthal's investigation as "intimidation" of scientists by an elected official with close ties to Lyme advocacy groups. The Journal of the American Medical Association described the decision as an example of the "politicization of health policy" that went against the weight of scientific evidence and may have a chilling effect on future decisions by medical associations. In 2008, Blumenthal ended the investigation after the IDSA agreed to conduct a review of the guidelines. In 2010, an eight-member independent review panel unanimously agreed that the original 2006 guideline recommendations were "medically and scientifically justified" in the light of the evidence. The committee did not change any of the earlier recommendations but did alter some of the language in an executive summary of the findings. Blumenthal said he would review the final report.

==== MySpace/Facebook ====
In March 2006, Blumenthal noted that more than seven incidents of sexual assault in Connecticut had been linked directly to MySpace contacts. Earlier that year, Blumenthal and attorneys general in at least five other states were involved in discussions with MySpace that resulted in the implementation of technological changes aimed at protecting children from pornography and child predators on the company's website. At Blumenthal's urging, MySpace installed a link to free blocking software ("K9 Web Protection"), but in May 2006, Blumenthal announced that the site had failed to make the program easy to find and that it was not clearly labeled. He also urged MySpace to take further steps to safeguard children, including purging deep links to pornography and inappropriate material, tougher age verification, and banning users under 16.

Blumenthal was co-chair, along with North Carolina Attorney General Roy Cooper, of the State Attorney General Task Force on Social Networking. In 2008, the attorneys general commissioned the Internet Safety Technical Task Force report, which researched "ways to help squash the onslaught of sexual predators targeting younger social-networking clients".

Blumenthal's office subpoenaed MySpace for information about the number of registered sex offenders on its site. In 2009, MySpace revealed that over a two-year span it had roughly 90,000 members who were registered sex offenders (nearly double what MySpace officials had originally estimated one year earlier). Blumenthal accused MySpace of having "monstrously inadequate counter-measures" to prevent sex offenders from creating MySpace profiles.

Blumenthal and Cooper secured agreements from MySpace and Facebook to make their sites safer. Both implemented dozens of safeguards, including finding better ways to verify users' ages, banning convicted sex offenders, and limiting the ability of older users to search for members under 18.

In 2024, Blumenthal helped lead the Kids Online Safety Act to address depression, sexual exploitation, bullying, harassment, and other harms children experience online.

==== Craigslist ====
In March 2008, Blumenthal issued a letter to Craigslist attorneys demanding that the website cease allowing postings for erotic services, which he claimed promoted prostitution, and accused the site of "turning a blind eye" to the problem. He worked with Craigslist and a group of 40 attorneys general to create new measures on the site designed to thwart ads for prostitution and other illegal sexual activities. In April 2009, Craigslist came under the scrutiny of law enforcement agencies following the arrest of Philip Markoff (the "Craigslist Killer"), suspected of killing a 25-year-old masseuse he met through Craigslist at a Boston hotel. Blumenthal subsequently called for a series of specific measures to fight prostitution and pornography on Craigslist—including steep financial penalties for rule breaking, and incentives for reporting wrongdoing. He said, "Craigslist has the means—and moral obligation—to stop the pimping and prostituting in plain sight."

Leading a coalition of 39 states, in May 2010 Blumenthal subpoenaed Craigslist as part of an investigation into whether the site was taking sufficient action to curb prostitution ads and whether it was profiting from them. He said that prostitution ads remained on the site despite previous assurances that they would be removed. The subpoena sought documents related to Craigslist's processes for reviewing potentially objectionable ads, as well as documents detailing the revenue gained from ads sold to Craigslist's erotic services and adult services categories. In August 2010, Blumenthal called on Craigslist to shut the section down permanently and take steps to eradicate prostitution ads from other parts of the site. He also called on Congress to alter a landmark communications law (the Communications Decency Act) that Craigslist has cited in defense of the ads.

Following continued pressure, Craigslist removed the adult services sections from its U.S. sites in September 2010 and from its international sites in December 2010. Blumenthal called the decision a victory against sexual exploitation of women and children, and against human trafficking connected to prostitution.

Blumenthal and other state attorneys general reached a settlement with Craigslist on the issue; the settlement called for the company to charge people via credit card for any ads that were suggestive in nature so the person could be tracked down if they were determined to be offering prostitution. But Blumenthal remarked that after the settlement, the ads continued to flourish using code words.

==== Terrorist surveillance program ====
In October 2007, Blumenthal and the attorneys general of four other states lobbied Congress to reject proposals to provide immunity from litigation to telecommunications firms that cooperated with the federal government's terrorist surveillance program following the September 11 attacks. In 2008 Congress passed and President George W. Bush signed into law a new terrorist surveillance bill including the telecom immunity provisions Blumenthal opposed.

==== Countrywide Financial ====
In August 2008, Blumenthal announced that Connecticut had joined California, Illinois and Florida in suing subprime mortgage lender Countrywide Financial (now owned by Bank of America) for fraudulent business practices. The suit alleged that Countrywide pushed consumers into "deceptive, unaffordable loans and workouts, and charged homeowners in default unjustified and excessive legal fees." According to Blumenthal, "Countrywide conned customers into loans that were clearly unaffordable and unsustainable, turning the American Dream of homeownership into a nightmare" and when consumers defaulted, "the company bullied them into workouts doomed to fail." He also claimed that Countrywide "crammed unconscionable legal fees into renegotiated loans, digging consumers deeper into debt" and "broke promises that homeowners could refinance, condemning them to hopelessly unaffordable loans." The lawsuit demanded that Countrywide make restitution to affected borrowers, give up improper gains and rescind, reform or modify all mortgages that broke state laws. It is also sought civil fines of up to $100,000 per violation of state banking laws, and up to $5,000 per violation of state consumer protection laws.

In October 2008, Bank of America initially agreed to settle the states' suits for $8.4 billion, and in February 2010, Countrywide mailed payments of $3,452.54 to 370 Connecticut residents. The settlement forced Bank of America to establish a $150 million fund to help repay borrowers whose homes had been foreclosed upon, $1.3 million of which went to Connecticut.

Blumenthal commented in defense of U.S. senator and Senate Banking Committee chair Christopher Dodd, who had been harshly criticized for accepting a VIP loan from Countrywide, "there's no evidence of wrongdoing on [Mr. Dodd's] part any more than victims who were misled or deceived by Countrywide." In August 2010, Dodd was cleared by the Senate Ethics Committee, which found "no credible evidence" that he knowingly tried to use his status as a U.S. senator to receive loan terms not available to the public.

==== Global warming ====
Blumenthal has been a vocal advocate of the scientific consensus on climate change, that human activity is responsible for rising global temperatures and that prompt action to reduce greenhouse gas emissions must be taken. He has urged the Environmental Protection Agency to declare carbon dioxide a dangerous air pollutant. "I urge the new Obama EPA to declare carbon dioxide a danger to human health and welfare so we can at last begin addressing the potentially disastrous threat global warming poses to health, the environment and our economy. We must make up for lost time before it's too late to curb dangerous warming threatening to devastate the planet and human society." He has brought suit against a number of electric utilities in the Midwest, arguing that coal-burning power plants are generating excess CO_{2} emissions. In 2009, the Second Circuit Court of Appeals agreed to allow Blumenthal's lawsuit to proceed. Blumenthal has said, "no reputable climate scientist disputes the reality of global warming. It is fact, plain and simple. Dithering will be disastrous."

=== Prospect of gubernatorial candidacy ===
Blumenthal was often considered a top prospect for the Democratic nominee for governor of Connecticut, but never ran for the office.

On March 18, 2007, Hartford Courant columnist Kevin Rennie reported that Blumenthal had become seriously interested in running for governor in 2010. On February 2, 2009, Blumenthal announced he would forgo a gubernatorial run and seek reelection that year as attorney general.

== U.S. Senate (2011–present) ==
=== Elections ===
==== 2010 ====
Election results by county

After Chris Dodd announced on January 6, 2010, that he would retire from the Senate at the end of his term, Blumenthal told the Associated Press that he would run in the election for Dodd's seat in November 2010. Later that day, President Barack Obama and Vice President Joe Biden called Blumenthal to express their best wishes.

The same day, Public Policy Polling released a poll they took on the two preceding evenings, including races where Blumenthal was paired against each of the three most-mentioned Republicans contending for their party's nomination for the seat. He led by at least 30% in each hypothetical race: against Rob Simmons (59%–28%), against Linda McMahon (60%–28%), and against Peter Schiff (63%–23%), with a 4.3% margin of error cited. Rasmussen Reports also polled after Blumenthal announced his candidacy and found a somewhat more competitive race, but with Blumenthal holding a strong lead.

A February poll by Rasmussen found that Blumenthal held leads of 19 against Simmons and 20 against McMahon, and that Republicans had made up little ground since the initial Rasmussen poll after Blumenthal announced. On May 21, Blumenthal received the Democratic nomination by acclamation.

The New York Times reported that Blumenthal misspoke on at least one occasion by saying he'd served with the military "in Vietnam". Video emerged of him speaking to a group of veterans and supporters in March 2008 in Norwalk, saying, in reference to supporting troops returning from Iraq and Afghanistan, "We have learned something important since the days that I served in Vietnam." There were also other occasions where he accurately described his military service. At a 2008 ceremony in Shelton, Connecticut, he said, "I served during the Vietnam era... I remember the taunts, the insults, sometimes even physical abuse."

Blumenthal's commanding officer in 1974 and 1975, Larry Baldino of Woodbridge, addressed the controversy in a letter to the editor in the New Haven Register. Baldino wrote that the misleading statement was too "petty" to be the basis for supporting or not supporting Blumenthal. Baldino further called Blumenthal "good-natured" and "one of the best Marines with whom I ever worked".

Blumenthal denied having intentionally misled voters about his military service, but later apologized to voters for his lack of clarity.

Days after the nomination, Quinnipiac University Polling Institute polling indicated that Blumenthal held a 25-point lead over McMahon. The Cook Political Report changed its assessment of the race to Leans Democratic, making Blumenthal the favored candidate over McMahon.

Blumenthal won the November 2 election, defeating McMahon 55% to 43%.

==== 2016 ====
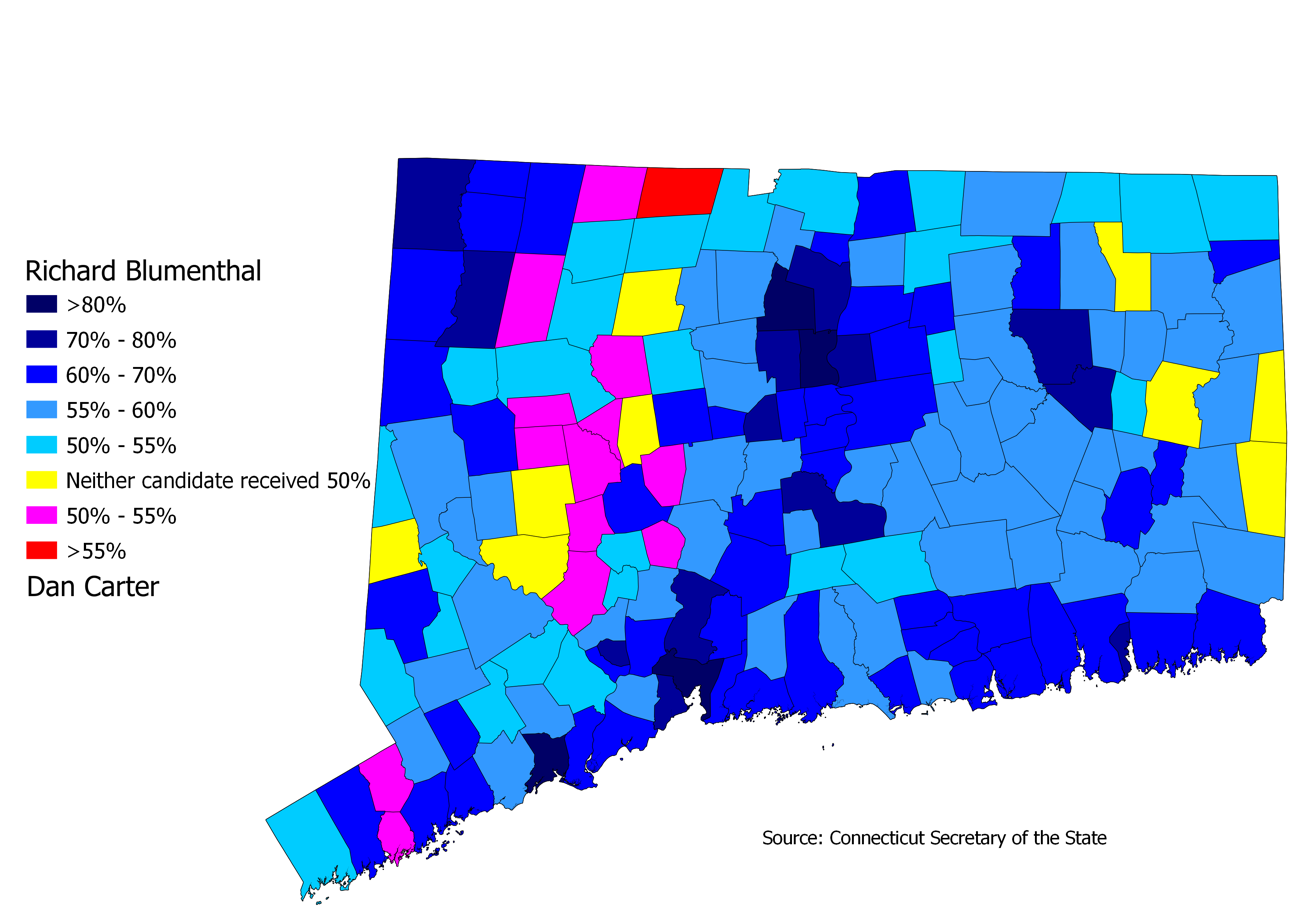
Results of the 2016 U.S. Senate election in Connecticut by town

August Wolf, a bond salesman and former Olympian, was the only declared Republican candidate running against Blumenthal in the 2016 Senate election.

In August 2015, economist Larry Kudlow threatened to run against Blumenthal if Blumenthal voted in favor of the Iran Nuclear Deal.

According to a pair of Quinnipiac polls on October 15, 2015, Blumenthal had a 34-point lead over Kudlow and a 35-point lead over Wolf.

Blumenthal was reelected with 63% of the vote against Republican state representative Dan Carter, becoming the first person in Connecticut's history to receive over a million votes in a single election.

==== 2022 ====
In November 2020, Blumenthal announced that he would seek reelection in 2022. In the general election, he defeated Leora Levy, who defeated former Connecticut House Minority Leader Themis Klarides in the Republican primary.

=== Tenure ===
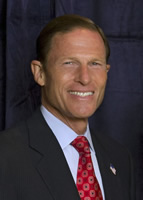
Blumenthal during the 112th Congress

Blumenthal was sworn into the 112th United States Congress on January 5, 2011. He announced plans to return to Connecticut every weekend to join a "listening tour" of his home state.

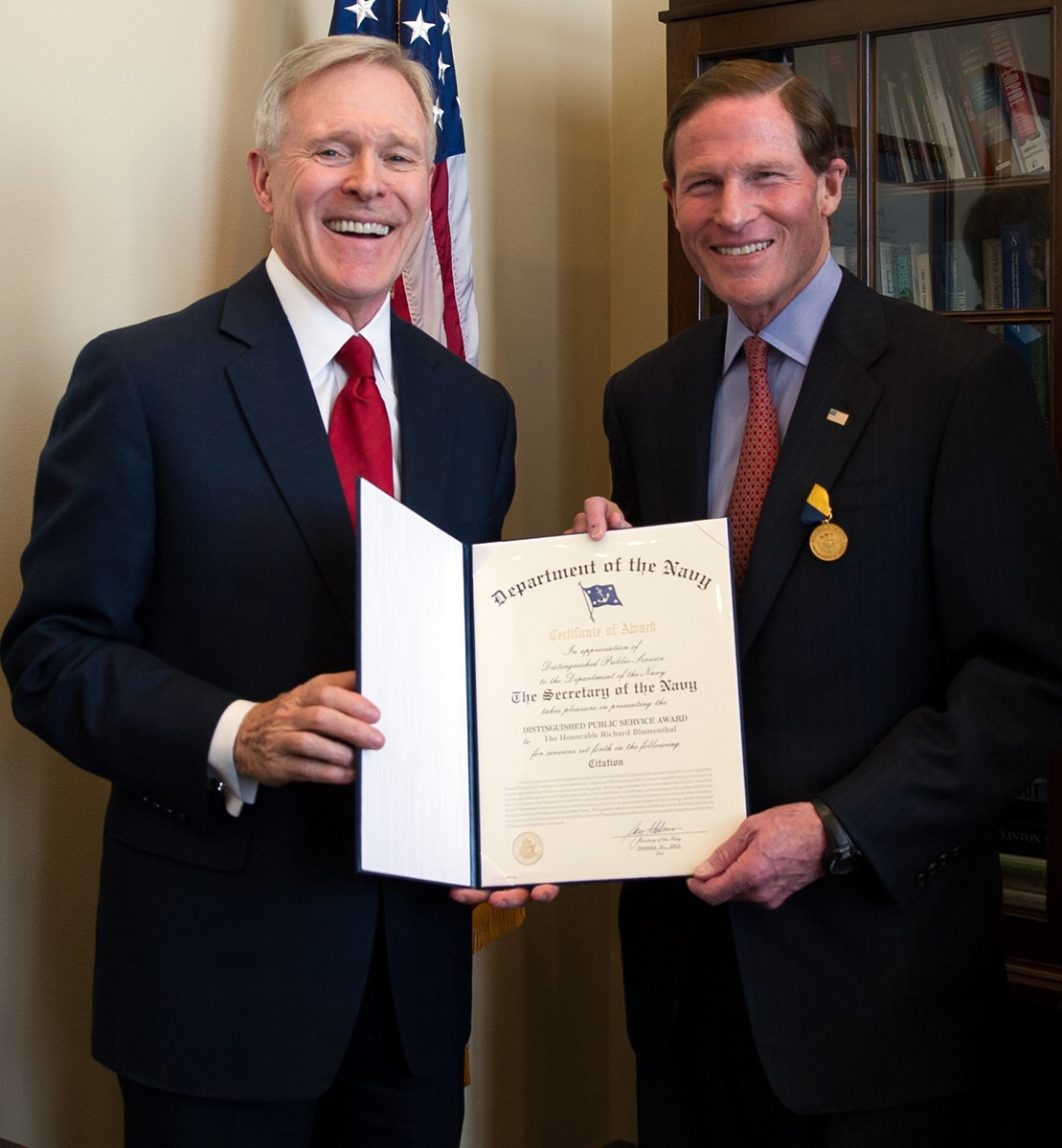
Secretary of the Navy Ray Mabus presents the Navy Distinguished Public Service Medal to U.S. Senator Richard Blumenthal in 2012.

In March 2012, Blumenthal and New York senator Chuck Schumer gained national attention after they called upon Attorney General Eric Holder and the Department of Justice to investigate practices by employers to require Facebook passwords for employee applicants and workers.

Blumenthal worked with Senator Mark Kirk to eliminate pensions for members of Congress who are convicted of felonies while serving in office.

In Blumenthal v. Trump, Blumenthal and Representative John Conyers Jr. led a group of 196 congressmen in filing a federal lawsuit accusing President Trump of violating the emoluments clause of the US Constitution.

In the wake of the 2021 attack on the United States Capitol, Blumenthal blamed Trump, saying that Trump "incited, instigated and supported" the attack. He called for Vice President Mike Pence to invoke the Twenty-fifth Amendment to the United States Constitution. Blumenthal also requested an investigation into the lack of response from law enforcement and the military.

In December 2021, Blumenthal gave a speech honoring three local labor activists at an awards ceremony in New Haven that was hosted by the Connecticut People's World Committee, an affiliate of the Connecticut Communist Party. After criticism from national Republican politicians and conservative media outlets, Blumenthal said that he is "a strong supporter and believer in American capitalism" and would not have attended had he known of the group's Communist ties.

=== Committee assignments ===
- Committee on Armed Services
  - Subcommittee on Airland
  - Subcommittee on Personnel
  - Subcommittee on Readiness and Management Support
  - Subcommittee on SeaPower
- Committee on Homeland Security and Governmental Affairs
  - Subcommittee on Investigations (chairman)
  - Subcommittee on Government Operations and Border Management
- Committee on the Judiciary
  - Subcommittee on Competition Policy, Antitrust and Consumer Rights
  - Subcommittee on Federal Courts, Oversight, Agency Action and Federal Rights
  - Subcommittee on Human Rights and the Law
  - Subcommittee on Privacy, Technology and the Law
  - Subcommittee on the Constitution
- Committee on Veterans' Affairs
- Special Committee on Aging

=== Caucus memberships ===
- Black Maternal Health Caucus
- Expand Social Security Caucus
- Senate Oceans Caucus
- Senate Ukraine Caucus
- Congressional Coalition on Adoption

== Political positions ==
=== Abortion ===
Blumenthal is pro-choice. He supports efforts to make it a crime for demonstrators to block access to health clinics. He opposed efforts by Walmart to ban the sale of emergency contraception and supports requirements that pharmacies fill birth control prescriptions. He supports federal funding for family planning clinics. After Roe v. Wade was overturned in June 2022, Blumenthal said the decision "strips women of the freedom to make their own health care decisions & puts that power in the hands of the government."

=== Animal welfare ===
In 2024, Blumenthal and U.S. representatives Earl Blumenauer and Brian Fitzpatrick introduced the Captive Primate Safety Act, legislation that would prohibit private ownership of chimpanzees and other primates as pets. The legislation was endorsed by animal rights and animal welfare groups and law enforcement associations.

=== Foreign relations ===
==== China ====
In April 2018, Blumenthal stated his support for "strong efforts to crack down on intellectual property theft and unfair trade practices by China or any other nation", but said that Trump was implementing "trade policy by tweet, reaction based on impulse and rash rhetoric that can only escalate tensions with all economic powers and lead to a trade war" and that U.S. actions through trade without a strategy or an endgame seemed "highly dangerous" to the American economy.

In June 2018, Blumenthal cosponsored a bipartisan bill that would reinstate penalties on ZTE for export control violations in addition to barring American government agencies from either purchasing or leasing equipment or services from ZTE or Huawei. The bill was offered as an amendment to the National Defense Authorization Act for 2019 and was in direct contrast to the Trump administration's announced intent to ease sanctions on ZTE.

In August 2018, Blumenthal and 16 other lawmakers urged the Trump administration to impose sanctions under the Global Magnitsky Act against Chinese officials who are responsible for human rights abuses against the Uyghur Muslim minority in the Xinjiang region. They wrote, "The detention of as many as a million or more Uyghurs and other predominantly Muslim ethnic minorities in 'political reeducation' centers or camps requires a tough, targeted, and global response."

In May 2019, Blumenthal was a cosponsor of the South China Sea and East China Sea Sanctions Act, a bipartisan bill reintroduced by Marco Rubio and Ben Cardin that was intended to disrupt China's consolidation or expansion of its claims of jurisdiction over both the sea and air space in disputed zones in the South China Sea.

In July 2019, Blumenthal was a cosponsor of the Defending America's 5G Future Act, a bill that would prevent Huawei from being removed from the "entity list" of the Commerce Department without an act of Congress and authorize Congress to block administration waivers for U.S. companies to do business with Huawei. The bill would also codify Trump's executive order from the previous May that empowered his administration to block foreign tech companies deemed a national security threat from conducting business in the United States.

In 2025, Blumenthal supported secondary sanctions against Russia that would impose 500% tariffs on countries that buy Russian oil, natural gas, uranium and other exports. China is one of the major consumers of Russian energy.

==== Middle East ====
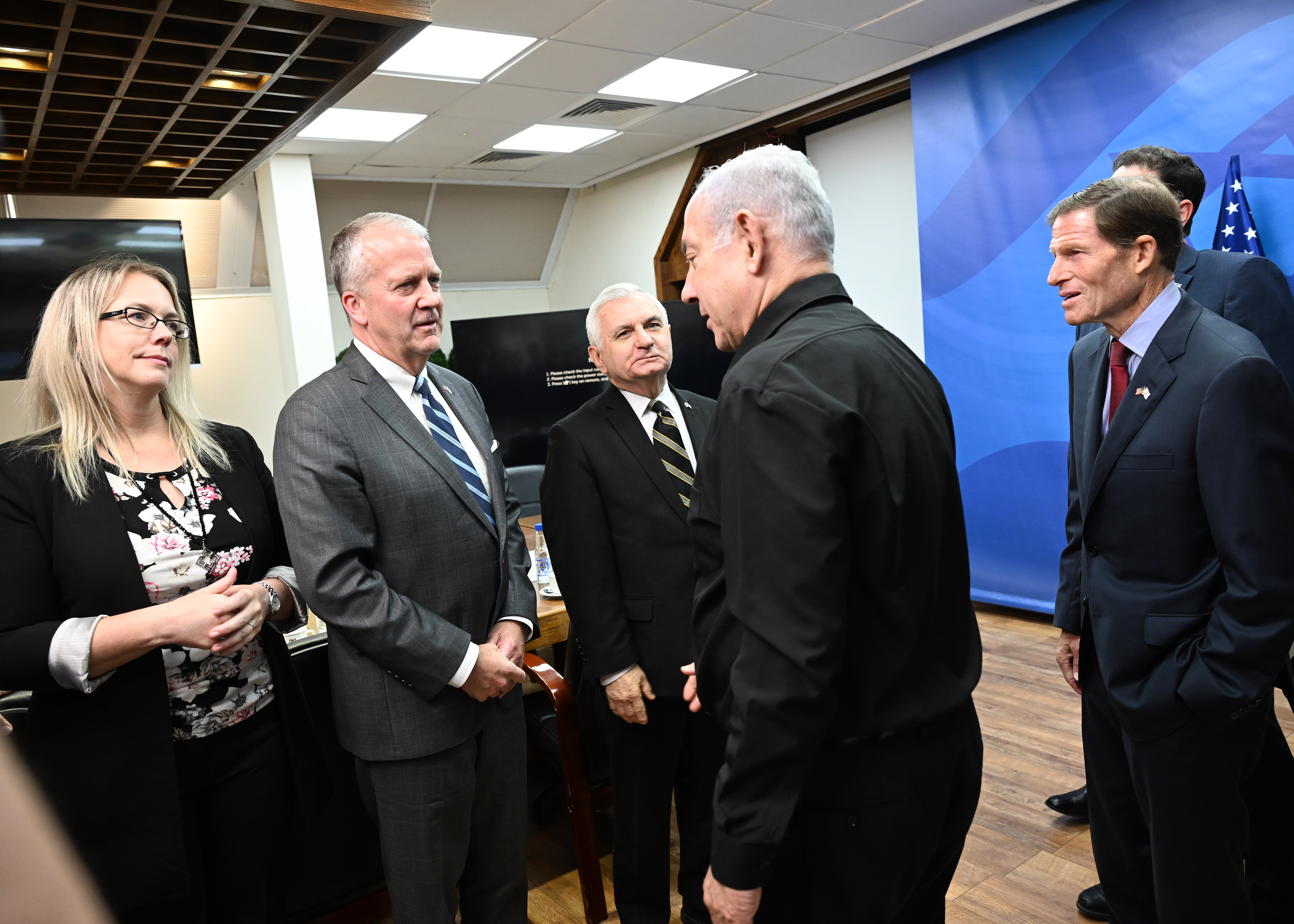
Blumenthal with Israeli prime minister Benjamin Netanyahu in Israel on October 22, 2023

In March 2017, Blumenthal co-sponsored the Israel Anti-Boycott Act (S.270), which made it a federal crime, punishable by a maximum sentence of 20 years imprisonment, for Americans to encourage or participate in boycotts against Israel and Israeli settlements in the occupied Palestinian territories if protesting actions by the Israeli government.

In March 2019, Blumenthal was one of nine Democratic senators to sign a letter to Salman of Saudi Arabia requesting the release of human rights lawyer Waleed Abu al-Khair and writer Raif Badawi, women's rights activists Loujain al-Hathloul and Samar Badawi, and Dr. Walid Fitaih. The senators wrote, "Not only have reputable international organizations detailed the arbitrary detention of peaceful activists and dissidents without trial for long periods, but the systematic discrimination against women, religious minorities and mistreatment of migrant workers and others has also been well-documented."

In October 2022, Saudi Arabia, with Russia, announced a cut of 2 million barrels a day of oil production at the OPEC+ meeting. Blumenthal accused Saudi Arabia of undermining U.S. efforts and helping to boost 2022 Russian invasion of Ukraine. In an opinion piece, he and Ro Khanna proposed to promptly pause the massive transfer of American warfare technology to Saudi Arabia and take a tougher stance against the kingdom.

In February 2026, Blumenthal began an investigation into the flow of foreign money into Iran. Referencing reporting from multiple media outlets, he announced an investigation into the use of Binance and cryptocurrency to avoid U.S. sanctions on Iran.

In April 2026, Blumenthal was one of seven Democratic senators to join all Republicans in opposing a pair of resolutions that would have blocked sales of bulldozers and 1,000-pound bombs to Israel.

=== Government shutdown ===
In March 2019, Blumenthal was one of 39 senators to sign a letter to the Appropriations Committee opining that contractor workers and by extension their families "should not be penalized for a government shutdown that they did nothing to cause" while noting that there were bills in both chambers of Congress that would provide back pay to compensate contractor employees for lost wages, urging the Appropriations Committee "to include back pay for contractor employees in a supplemental appropriations bill for FY2019 or as part of the regular appropriations process for FY2020."

=== Gun control ===
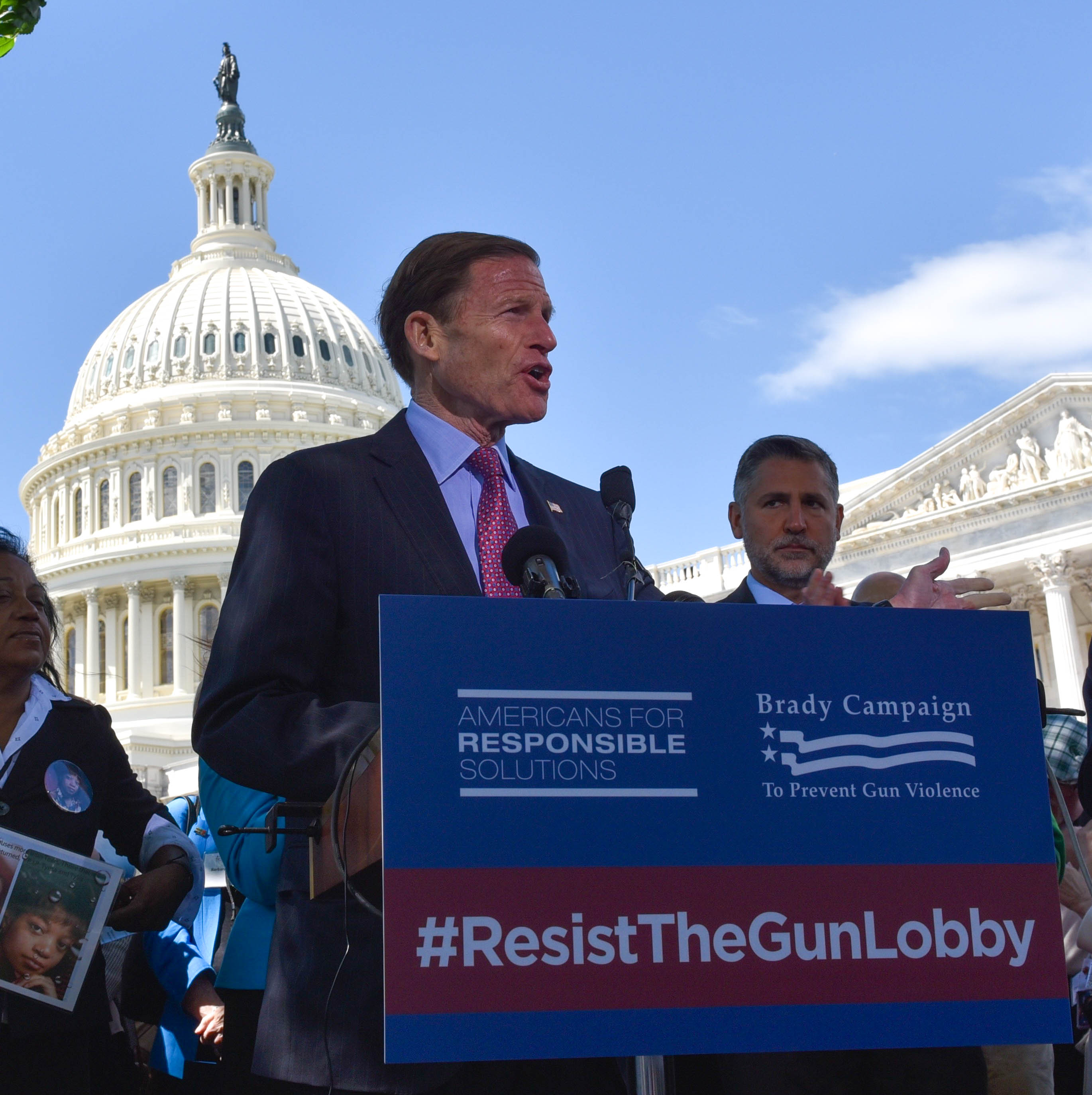
Blumenthal speaks in favor of gun control in 2017

Blumenthal supports gun control. He supports a national assault weapons ban and introduced such a ban in 2017 and 2023.

In response to the 2015 San Bernardino attack, Blumenthal gave his support for improved access to mental health resources and universal background checks.

In January 2016, Blumenthal was one of 18 senators to sign a letter to Thad Cochran and Barbara Mikulski requesting that the Labor, Health and Education subcommittee hold a hearing on whether to allow the Centers for Disease Control and Prevention (CDC) to fund a study of gun violence and "the annual appropriations rider that some have interpreted as preventing it" with taxpayer dollars. The senators noted their support for taking steps "to fund gun-violence research, because only the United States government is in a position to establish an integrated public-health research agenda to understand the causes of gun violence and identify the most effective strategies for prevention."

In the wake of the Orlando nightclub shooting, Blumenthal said, "The Senate's inaction on commonsense gun violence prevention makes it complicit in this public health crisis. Prayers and platitudes are insufficient. The American public is beseeching us to act on commonsense, sensible gun violence prevention measures, and we must heed that call."

In October 2016, Blumenthal participated in the Chris Murphy gun control filibuster, speaking in support of the Feinstein Amendment, which would have banned people known to be or suspected of being terrorists from buying guns. That same year, he stated his support for efforts to require toy or fake firearms to have orange parts so they could more easily be distinguished from real guns.

In response to the 2017 Las Vegas shooting, Blumenthal declared in an interview with Judy Woodruff, "we must break the grip of the NRA". He continued, "we can at least save lives. Would it have prevented the Las Vegas atrocity, that unspeakable tragedy? We will never know. But it might have, and we can definitely prevent such mass shootings by adopting these kinds of commonsense measures."

In 2018, Blumenthal was a cosponsor of the NICS Denial Notification Act, legislation developed in the aftermath of the Stoneman Douglas High School shooting that would require federal authorities to inform states within a day after a person failing the National Instant Criminal Background Check System attempted to buy a firearm.

In January 2019, Blumenthal was one of 40 senators to introduce the Background Check Expansion Act, legislation that would require background checks for either the sale or transfer of all firearms including all unlicensed sellers. Exceptions to the bill's background check requirement included transfers between members of law enforcement, loaning firearms for either hunting or sporting events on a temporary basis, providing firearms as gifts to members of one's immediate family, firearms being transferred as part of an inheritance, or giving a firearm to another person temporarily for immediate self-defense.

In June 2019, Blumenthal was one of four senators to cosponsor the Help Empower Americans to Respond (HEAR) Act, legislation that would ban suppressors being imported, sold, made, sent elsewhere or possessed and grant a silencer buyback program as well as include certain exceptions for current and former law enforcement personnel and others. The bill was intended to respond to the Virginia Beach shooting, where the perpetrator used a .45-caliber handgun with multiple extended magazines and a suppressor.

=== Health care ===
In February 2019, Blumenthal was one of 23 Democratic senators to introduce the State Public Option Act, legislation that would authorize states to form a Medicaid buy-in program for all residents and thereby grant all denizens of the state the ability to buy into a state-driven Medicaid health insurance plan if they wished. Brian Schatz, a bill cosponsor, said the legislation would "unlock each state's Medicaid program to anyone who wants it, giving people a high-quality, low-cost public health insurance option", and that its goal was "to make sure that every single American has comprehensive health care coverage."

In June 2019, Blumenthal was one of eight senators to cosponsor the Territories Health Equity Act of 2019, legislation that would remove the cap on annual federal Medicaid funding and increase federal matching rate for Medicaid expenditures of territories along with more funds being provided for prescription drug coverage to low-income seniors in an attempt to equalize funding for American territories Puerto Rico, the Virgin Islands, Guam, American Samoa and the Northern Mariana Islands with that of U.S. states.

In June 2019, Blumenthal and 14 other senators introduced the Affordable Medications Act, legislation that would promote transparency by mandating that pharmaceutical companies disclose the amount of money going to research and development, marketing and executives' salaries. The bill also abolished the restriction that stopped the federal Medicare program from using its buying power to negotiate lower drug prices for beneficiaries and hinder drug company monopoly practices used to keep prices high and disable less expensive generics entering the market.

In August 2019, Blumenthal was one of 19 senators to sign a letter to Treasury Secretary Steve Mnuchin and Health and Human Services Secretary Alex Azar requesting data from the Trump administration to help states and Congress understand the potential consequences in the event that the Texas v. United States Affordable Care Act (ACA) lawsuit prevailed in courts, claiming that an overhaul of the present health care system would form "an enormous hole in the pocketbooks of the people we serve as well as wreck state budgets". That same month, Blumenthal, three other Senate Democrats, and Bernie Sanders signed a letter to acting FDA commissioner Ned Sharpless in response to Novartis falsifying data as part of an attempt to gain the FDA's approval for its new gene therapy Zolgensma, writing that it was "unconscionable that a drug company would provide manipulated data to federal regulators in order to rush its product to market, reap federal perks, and charge the highest amount in American history for its medication."

=== Immigration ===
In August 2018, Blumenthal was one of 17 senators to sign a letter spearheaded by Kamala Harris to Homeland Security Secretary Kirstjen Nielsen demanding that the Trump administration take immediate action in attempting to reunite 539 migrant children with their families, citing each passing day of inaction as intensifying "trauma that this administration has needlessly caused for children and their families seeking humanitarian protection."

In April 2019, Blumenthal was one of six Democratic senators to sign a letter to acting defense secretary Patrick M. Shanahan expressing concern over memos by Marine Corps general Robert Neller in which Neller critiqued deployments to the southern border and funding transfers under Trump's national emergency declaration as having posed an "unacceptable risk to Marine Corps combat readiness and solvency" and noted that other military officials had recently stated that troop deployment did not affect readiness. The senators requested Shanahan explain the inconsistencies and that he provide both "a staff-level briefing on this matter within seven days" and an explanation of how he would address Neller's concerns.

In June 2019, following the Housing and Urban Development Department's confirmation that DACA recipients did not meet eligibility for federal backed loans, Blumenthal and 11 other senators introduced The Home Ownership Dreamers Act, legislation that mandated that the federal government was not authorized to deny mortgage loans backed by the Federal Housing Administration, Fannie Mae, Freddie Mac, or the Agriculture Department solely due to an applicant's immigration status.

In June 2019, Blumenthal and six other Democratic senators led by Brian Schatz sent letters to the Government Accountability Office along with the suspension and debarment official and inspector general at the US Department of Health and Human Services citing recent reports that showed "significant evidence that some federal contractors and grantees have not provided adequate accommodations for children in line with legal and contractual requirements" and urging government officials to determine whether federal contractors and grantees were in violation of contractual obligations or federal regulations and should thus face financial consequences.

In July 2019, following reports that the Trump administration intended to end protections of spouses, parents and children of active-duty service members from deportation, Blumenthal was one of 22 senators to sign a letter led by Tammy Duckworth arguing that the program allowed service members the ability "to fight for the United States overseas and not worry that their spouse, children, or parents will be deported while they are away" and that the program's termination would cause personal hardship for service members in combat.

In July 2019, Blumenthal and 15 other Senate Democrats introduced the Protecting Sensitive Locations Act, which mandated that ICE agents get approval from a supervisor before engaging in enforcement actions at sensitive locations except in special circumstances and that agents receive annual training in addition to being required to annually report enforcement actions in those locations.

=== LGBT rights ===
In September 2014, Blumenthal was one of 69 members of the US House and Senate to sign a letter to then-FDA commissioner Sylvia Burwell requesting that the FDA revise its policy banning donation of corneas and other tissues by men who have had sex with other men in the preceding five years.

In June 2019, Blumenthal was one of 18 senators to sign a letter to Secretary of State Mike Pompeo requesting an explanation of a State Department decision not to issue an official statement that year commemorating Pride Month or the annual cable outlining activities for embassies commemorating Pride Month. They also asked why the LGBTI special envoy position had remained vacant and asserted that "preventing the official flying of rainbow flags and limiting public messages celebrating Pride Month signals to the international community that the United States is abandoning the advancement of LGBTI rights as a foreign policy priority."

In 2022, Blumenthal voted for the Respect for Marriage Act, a bill intended to codify same-sex marriage rights into federal law.

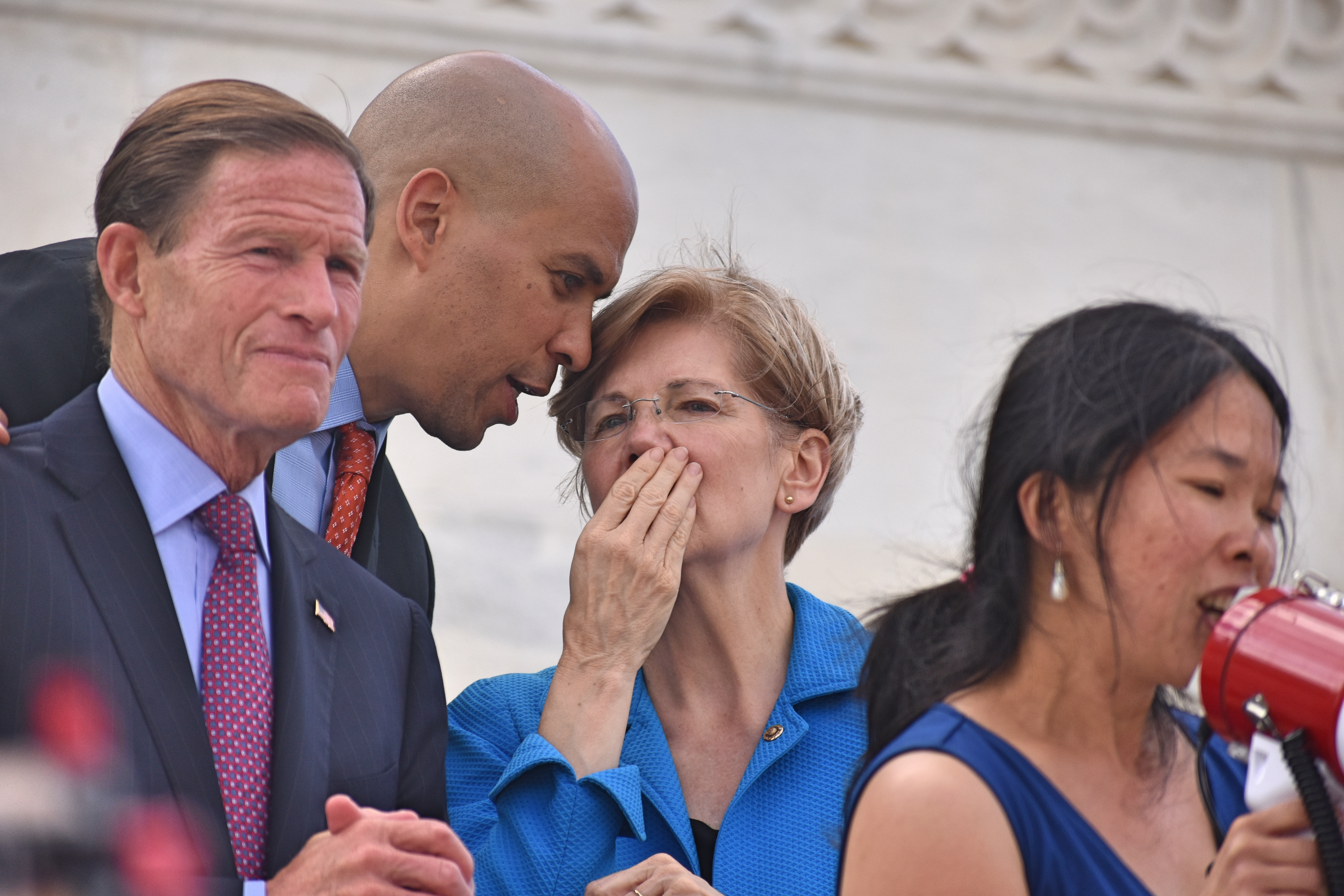
Protest against the GOP health bill at the United States Capitol in July 2017

=== Special Counsel investigation ===
In March 2019, after Attorney General William Barr released a summary of the Mueller report, Blumenthal said the issue was about "obstruction of justice, no exoneration there, and the judgment by William Barr may have been completely improper" and that he did not "deeply respect and trust the Barr summary, which was designed to frame the message before the information was available." After the Justice Department publicly released the redacted version of the report the following month, Blumenthal said, "What's demonstrated in powerful and compelling detail in this report is nothing less than a national scandal. This report is far from the end of the inquiry that this country needs and deserves. It is the beginning of another chapter."

In April 2019, Blumenthal was one of 12 Democratic senators to sign a letter led by Mazie Hirono that questioned Barr's decision to offer "his own conclusion that the President's conduct did not amount to obstruction of justice" and called for both the Justice Department's inspector general and the Office of Professional Responsibility to launch an investigation into whether Barr's summary of the Mueller report and his April 18 news conference were misleading.

=== 2024 New Jersey drone sightings ===
In 2024, Blumenthal said suspicious drones found flying over areas in the New Jersey and North Atlantic region should be shot down if necessary and that "We should be doing some very urgent intelligence analysis and take them out of the skies, especially if they're flying over airports or military bases".

== Personal life ==
On June 27, 1982, Blumenthal married Cynthia Malkin. Blumenthal and Malkin were engaged during her senior year at Harvard and married the following year. She is the daughter of Peter L. Malkin and maternal granddaughter of Lawrence Wien. They have four children. Their son Matt Blumenthal was elected to the Connecticut House of Representatives from the 147th district in 2018.

Blumenthal's wealth exceeds $100 million, making him one of the Senate's richest members. His family's net worth derives largely from his wife; the Malkins are influential real estate developers and property managers with holdings including an ownership stake in the Empire State Building.

On April 8, 2023, while at a parade celebrating the UConn Huskies men's basketball team winning the 2023 NCAA Division I men's basketball tournament championship, another attendee inadvertently fell on Blumenthal, causing a minor fracture of his femur. He underwent surgery, which he said was successful, and left the hospital on April 10.

== Electoral history ==
=== Connecticut Legislature ===
Connecticut 145th State House District general election, 1984
Party	Candidate	Votes	%
Democratic	Richard Blumenthal	4,863	68.18
Republican	Johan M. Andersen III	2,270	31.82
Total votes		7,133	100.00
Democratic hold			

Connecticut 27th State Senate District general election, 1988
Party	Candidate	Votes	%
Democratic	Richard Blumenthal (incumbent)	21,947	65.88
Republican	Ted Lewis	11,366	34.12
Total votes		33,313	100.00
Democratic hold			

=== Connecticut Attorney General ===
Connecticut Attorney General general election, 1990
Party	Candidate	Votes	%
Democratic	Richard Blumenthal	572,972	59.18
Republican	E. Gaynor Brennan Jr.	395,289	40.82
Total votes		968,261	100.00

Connecticut Attorney General general election, 1994
Party	Candidate	Votes	%
Democratic	Richard Blumenthal	446,434	43.60
A Connecticut Party (1990)	Richard Blumenthal	232,879	22.74
Total	Richard Blumenthal (incumbent)	679,313	66.34
Republican	Richard E. Arnold	344,627	33.66
Total votes		1,023,940	100.00
Democratic hold			

Connecticut Attorney General general election, 1998
Party	Candidate	Votes	%
Democratic	Richard Blumenthal (incumbent)	631,588	68.55
Republican	Santa Mendoza	282,289	30.64
Libertarian	Richard J. Pober	7,537	0.82
Total votes		921,414	100.00
Democratic hold			

Connecticut Attorney General general election, 2002
Party	Candidate	Votes	%
Democratic	Richard Blumenthal (incumbent)	632,351	65.65
Republican	Martha Dean	330,874	34.35
Total votes		963,225	100.00
Democratic hold			

Connecticut Attorney General general election, 2006
Party	Candidate	Votes	%
Democratic	Richard Blumenthal (incumbent)	782,235	74.08
Republican	Robert Farr	256,018	24.25
Green	Nancy Burton	17,684	1.67
write-in	John M. Joy	4	0.00
Total votes		1,055,941	100.00
Democratic hold			

=== U.S. Senator ===
Connecticut US Senator (Class III) general election, 2010
Party	Candidate	Votes	%
Democratic	Richard Blumenthal	605,204	52.52
Working Families	Richard Blumenthal	30,836	2.68
Total	Richard Blumenthal	636,040	55.19
Republican	Linda McMahon	498,341	43.24
Independent	Warren B. Mosier	11,275	0.98
Connecticut for Lieberman	Dr. John Mertens	6,735	0.58
Total votes		1,152,391	100.00
Democratic hold			

Connecticut US Senator (Class III) general election, 2016
Party	Candidate	Votes	%
Democratic	Richard Blumenthal	920,766	57.68
Working Families	Richard Blumenthal	87,948	5.48
Total	Richard Blumenthal (incumbent)	1,008,714	63.19
Republican	Dan Carter	552,621	34.62
Libertarian	Richard Lion	18,190	1.14
Green	Jeffery Russell	16,713	1.05
Total votes		1,596,238	100.00
Democratic hold			

Connecticut US Senator (Class III) general election, 2022
Party	Candidate	Votes	%
Democratic	Richard Blumenthal (incumbent)	724,785	57.45
Republican	Leora Levy	536,020	42.54
Write-in		80	0.0
Total votes		1,260,885	100.00
Democratic hold			

== See also ==
- List of Harvard University politicians
- List of Jewish American jurists
- List of Jewish members of the United States Congress
- List of law clerks for the second seat of the Supreme Court of the United States

== Notes ==
Legal offices
Preceded by Peter Dorsey	United States Attorney for the District of Connecticut; 1977–1981	Succeeded by Alan Nevas
Preceded by Clarine Riddle	Attorney General of Connecticut; 1991–2011	Succeeded by George Jepsen
Party political offices
Preceded by Joe Lieberman	Democratic nominee for Attorney General of Connecticut; 1990, 1994, 1998, 2002, 2006	Succeeded by George Jepsen
Preceded by Chris Dodd	Democratic nominee for U.S. senator from Connecticut (Class 3); 2010, 2016, 2022	Most recent
U.S. Senate
Preceded by Chris Dodd	U.S. Senator (Class 3) from Connecticut; 2011–present Served alongside: Joe Lieberman (until 2013); Chris Murphy (from 2013)	Incumbent
Preceded by Richard Burr	Ranking Member of the Senate Veterans' Affairs Committee; 2015–2017	Succeeded by Jon Tester
Preceded by Jerry Moran	Ranking Member of the Senate Veterans' Affairs Committee; 2025–present	Incumbent
U.S. order of precedence (ceremonial)
Preceded by Chris Coons	Order of precedence of the United States as United States Senator	Succeeded by Rand Paul
Preceded by Rand Paul	United States senators by seniority 31st	Succeeded by Mike Lee
