= 1986 Connecticut Attorney General election =

- November 4, 1986
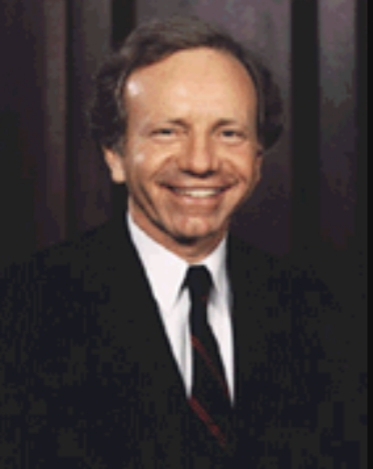

Nominee	Joe Lieberman	Richard E. Arnold
Party	Democratic	Republican
Popular vote	613,742	335,209
Percentage	64.7%	35.3%
- Lieberman: 50–60% 60–70% 70–80% 80–90% Arnold: 50–60% 60–70% 70–80%
Attorney General before election
Joe Lieberman
Democratic
Elected Attorney General
Joe Lieberman
Democratic

The 1986 Connecticut Attorney General election took place on November 4, 1986, to elect the Attorney General of Connecticut. Incumbent Democratic Attorney General Joe Lieberman won re-election to a second term, defeating Republican nominee Richard E. Arnold.

== Democratic primary ==
=== Candidates ===
==== Nominee ====
- Joe Lieberman, incumbent attorney general (1983–1989)

== Republican primary ==
=== Candidates ===
==== Nominee ====
- Richard E. Arnold

== General election ==
=== Results ===
1986 Connecticut Attorney General election
Party	Candidate	Votes	%	±%
Democratic	Joe Lieberman (incumbent)	613,742	64.68%	
Republican	Richard E. Arnold	335,209	35.32%	
Total votes		948,951	100.0%	
Democratic hold				

== See also ==
- Connecticut Attorney General
