= Arthur Belfer =

American businessman and philanthropist

- Born: Arthur Bejer Belfer; May 30, 1907
- Died: May 2, 1993 (aged 85)
- Occupations: Manufacturer; Petroleum development
- Known for: Founder of Belco Petroleum Corporation
- Spouses: Rochelle Anisfeld (died): Diane Belfer (until his death)
- Children: 3, including Robert A. Belfer

Arthur B. Belfer (May 30, 1907 – May 2, 1993) was a Polish-born American businessman and philanthropist who founded the Belco Petroleum Corporation.

== Biography ==
Belfer was born to a Jewish family in Wodzisław, Poland. He worked as a dealer in feathers and down in Kraków. In 1939, at the age of 33, he arrived on a business trip in the United States four days after the Nazi invasion of Poland and soon found out that all his money had no value. Convincing a New York investor to purchase feathers, he established the Belfer Corporation which manufactured down sleeping bags for the U.S. Army.

In 1953, the Belfer Corporation expanded into foam rubber and the petroleum.

In 1954, he founded the Belco Petroleum Corporation which was dedicated to the exploration and development of petroleum fields in Wyoming and Peru. Belco grew rapidly eventually becoming a Fortune 500 company.

In 1962, Belco was listed on the New York Stock Exchange.

In 1983, it merged with and into InterNorth, Inc., a holding company specializing in natural gas pipelines but also plastics, coal and petroleum; the new entity was renamed the BelNorth Petroleum Corporation, and became a subsidiary of InterNorth. In 1985, InterNorth merged with Houston Natural Gas and changed its name to the Enron Corporation. In 1985, Enron's Peruvian assets (formerly of Belco) were nationalized by the Peruvian government and Enron took a $218 million loss. In 1986, he resigned from Enron although remained a major shareholder. His son, Robert A. Belfer, continued to serve as a director at Enron.

His family's ownership interest in Enron reached nearly $2 billion in 2000, immediately before its collapse in 2001.

== Philanthropy ==
Belfer is known for numerous philanthropic activities. He established the Belfer Institute for Advanced Biomedical Studies at Yeshiva University, the Belfer Graduate School of Science of Yeshiva University, Belfer Audio Laboratory and Archive at Syracuse University, the Arthur and Rochelle Belfer Institute for Latino and Latin American Affairs, Arthur and Rochelle Belfer National Conference for Holocaust Education at the United States Holocaust Memorial Museum, the Diane & Arthur Belfer Geriatrics Center, endowed the R. A. Rees Pritchett Chair in Microbiology at Cornell University, and founded the Belfer Center for Energy Research in Israel.

== Personal life ==
Belfer was married twice. His first wife, Rochelle Anisfeld, died in 1961; they had three children: Robert A. Belfer (born 1935), Selma Belfer Ruben, and Anita Belfer Saltz. In 1965, he married Diane Belfer. Belfer died of cancer on January 2, 1993, in New York City. He was a resident of Manhattan and Palm Beach, Florida.
