= Robert A. Belfer =

American oilman and philanthropist

- Born: Robert Alexander Belfer; 1935 (age 90–91)
- Education: Columbia University (BA); Harvard University (JD)
- Children: 3
- Father: Arthur Belfer

Robert Alexander Belfer (born 1935) is an American businessman and philanthropist. He is the namesake of Belfer Center for Science and International Affairs at Harvard Kennedy School.

== Early life and education ==
Belfer is the son of American oil industry executive and multimillionaire Arthur Belfer, founder of the Belco Petroleum Corporation, which became a Fortune 500 company. Robert Belfer was born in Kraków, Poland in 1935 and graduated from Columbia College in 1955 and Harvard Law School in 1958.

== Career ==
After completing law school, Belfer joined the Belco Petroleum Corp. He was elected president in 1960 and was named its chairman in 1985. The company subsequently merged into the Omaha, Nebraska-based InterNorth, Inc., a predecessor to Enron. Belfer was on the Enron board of directors and not involved in the operations of the company. Belfer resigned from the board in June 2002. He was estimated to have held more than 16 million shares in the company which earned him a spot on the Forbes 400.

Belfer had diversified into New York City real estate and co-founded a second energy company, Belco Oil & Gas Corp., with his son in 1992. The company went public in 1996 through Goldman Sachs, raising more than $100 million. It was acquired by a Denver-based oil company in 2001.

== Philanthropy ==
In addition to his business ventures, Belfer is well known for his philanthropic endeavors. He is a major donor to the Metropolitan Museum of Art, where he founded the Robert and Renée Belfer Court for early Greek and prehistoric art in 1996. For decades, he has given to John F. Kennedy School of Government, which named Belfer Center for Science and International Affairs after him in 1997. He also donated to Weizmann Institute of Science as well as the Israel Museum.

His philanthropic activities have focused on medical institutions. He donated to Yeshiva University, whose tallest building, Belfer Hall, was named after his family, and served as the chair of the board of overseers of the Albert Einstein College of Medicine, where the Belfer family had established the Belfer Institute for Advanced Biomedical Studies. He also served on the board of Weill Cornell Graduate School of Medical Sciences, to which he donated $250 million over the years. The school's $100 million Belfer Research Building, dedicated in 2014, is named after him. Belfer sat on the board of directors of Dana–Farber Cancer Institute and donated $35 million to found the Robert A. and Renée E. Belfer Center for Applied Cancer Science.

He also was the founding donor for the Neurodegeneration Consortium, a multi-institutional collaboration to find treatments for Alzheimer's disease, which is based out of MD Anderson Cancer Center. Belfer has also supported the Aging Brain Initiative, an interdisciplinary research effort within the Picower Institute for Learning and Memory at MIT.

Belfer also endowed a professorship at Columbia University, the Robert and Renee Belfer Professor of International Relations, which is held by the political scientist Jack Snyder. He has supported the ADL Center for Technology and Society and its launch of the Belfer Fellows program, which brings awareness to online hate speech and harassment and works to promote equitable online spaces.

== Personal life ==
He is married to Renée E Belfer. The couple has three children, Shelly, Laurence and Elizabeth, and five grandchildren.
