= List of lakes of Rhode Island =

This is a list of lakes and ponds in Rhode Island, United States. The state contains hundreds of bodies of water, totaling to 20,749 acres (8,397 ha) of freshwater. The 237 largest lakes and ponds make up 91% of all inland freshwater area in the state. Most lakes in Rhode Island are manmade, only 25% are natural, five of these are greater than 100 acres (40 ha) in area. There are an additional nine large saltwater coastal lagoons along the south coast of Rhode Island. Swimming, fishing, and/or boating are permitted in some of these lakes, but not all.

Denotes saltwater pond (coastal lagoon)

Lakes of Rhode Island
Name	County	Coordinates	Area (acres)
Aldersgate Lake	Providence	41°57′42″N 71°39′46″W	
Allendale Mill Pond	Providence	41°51′10″N 71°29′00″W	13
Almy Pond	Newport	41°27′41″N 71°18′43″W	50
Almy Reservoir	Providence	41°48′55″N 71°31′10″W	56
Alton Pond	Washington	41°26′27″N 71°43′12″W	53
Annaquatucket Mill Pond	Washington	41°33′02″N 71°26′28″W	9
Annaquatucket Reservoir	Washington	41°33′13″N 71°26′48″W	
Arnold Mills Reservoir	Providence	41°58′52″N 71°23′24″W	255
Arnold Pond	Kent	41°39′56″N 71°44′51″W	73
Asa Pond	Washington	41°27′31″N 71°30′49″W	26
Ashville Pond	Washington	41°30′04″N 71°45′22″W	32
Austin Farm Pond	Washington	41°35′37″N 71°40′02″W	
Bailey Pond	Washington	41°30′37″N 71°38′59″W	
Bailey Pond	Kent	41°38′09″N 71°47′26″W	
Barber Pond	Washington	41°30′08″N 71°33′52″W	28
Barden Reservoir	Providence	41°47′31″N 71°40′26″W	240
Barney Pond	Providence	41°53′51″N 71°25′04″W	25
Beach Pond	Washington	41°34′32″N 71°47′25″W	459
Bellefont Pond	Providence	41°46′09″N 71°24′50″W	
Belleville Pond	Washington	41°33′35″N 71°28′23″W	108
Betty Pond	Providence	41°46′53″N 71°34′03″W	24
Betty Pucky Pond	Washington	41°10′55″N 71°35′03″W	
Big Round Top Pond	Providence	42°00′06″N 71°41′59″W	
Black Rock Reservoir	Kent	41°43′12″N 71°33′13″W	17
Blackamore Pond	Providence	41°46′27″N 71°26′47″W	20
Blackstone Pond	Providence	41°49′51″N 71°22′47″W	
Blackstone River Reservoir	Providence		
Bleachery Pond	Kent	41°39′09″N 71°27′37″W	6
Bleachery Pond	Providence	41°53′36″N 71°24′33″W	
Blue Pond	Washington	41°30′21″N 71°44′49″W	92
Boat House Gully	Newport	41°27′07″N 71°18′38″W	
Boone Lake	Washington	41°34′59″N 71°40′34″W	47
Booth Pond	Providence	41°58′55″N 71°30′18″W	
Bowdish Reservoir	Providence	41°55′25″N 71°46′55″W	126
Branch River Pond	Providence	41°57′36″N 71°38′28″W	
Breakheart Pond	Washington	41°35′55″N 71°42′05″W	48
Brickyard Pond	Bristol	41°44′03″N 71°19′09″W	84
Briggs Marsh Pond	Newport	41°28′40″N 71°09′58″W	187
Briggs Pond	Kent	41°43′03″N 71°46′00″W	11
Browning Mill Pond	Washington	41°33′27″N 71°41′34″W	46
Buck Hill Pond	Providence	41°59′24″N 71°47′16″W	90
Bull Head Pond	Washington	41°24′01″N 71°35′51″W	8
Burlingame Pond	Kent	41°43′36″N 71°34′16″W	
Burlingame Reservoir	Providence	41°54′51″N 71°44′32″W	69
Butterfly Pond	Providence	41°54′26″N 71°25′56″W	
Canada Pond	Providence	41°51′27″N 71°25′40″W	23
Capron Pond	Providence	41°54′22″N 71°31′20″W	10
Capwell Millpond	Kent	41°38′36″N 71°36′22″W	24
Card Ponds	Washington	41°22′32″N 71°33′58″W	41
Carr Pond (Coventry)	Kent	41°40′06″N 71°41′15″W	10
Carr Pond (North Kingstown)	Washington	41°31′26″N 71°27′04″W	55
Carr Pond (West Greenwich)	Kent	41°38′08″N 71°33′20″W	81
Cedar Swamp Pond (Burrillville)	Providence	41°57′51″N 71°47′01″W	8
Cedar Swamp Pond (South Kingstown)	Washington	41°24′19″N 71°32′28″W	10
Chapman Pond	Washington	41°22′50″N 71°47′36″W	163
Clark Pond	Providence	41°46′21″N 71°46′36″W	20
Coomer Lake	Providence	41°52′51″N 71°37′29″W	11
Cranston Print Works Pond	Providence	41°47′47″N 71°27′38″W	25
Creamer Pond	Newport	41°38′11″N 71°12′11″W	9
Cross Mills Pond	Washington	41°23′16″N 71°38′07″W	17
Deep Pond (Charlestown)	Washington	41°23′29″N 71°39′44″W	15
Deep Pond (Exeter)	Washington	41°33′37″N 71°45′43″W	17
Diamond Hill Reservoir	Providence	42°00′01″N 71°24′29″W	390
Dyer Pond	Providence	41°47′44″N 71°27′57″W	7
Easton Pond	Newport	41°29′29″N 71°17′31″W	147
Echo Lake	Bristol	41°44′07″N 71°20′04″W	24
Edgewood Lake	Providence	41°46′55″N 71°24′34″W	
Eisenhower Lake	Kent	41°37′16″N 71°42′56″W	56
Elm Lake	Providence	41°46′38″N 71°24′50″W	35
Flat River Reservoir (Johnson's Pond)	Kent	41°41′47″N 71°36′24″W	659
Fresh Pond (New Shoreham)	Washington	41°09′39″N 71°34′42″W	20
Fresh Pond (South Kingstown)	Washington	41°23′31″N 71°32′28″W	13
Gardiner Pond	Newport	41°29′29″N 71°15′14″W	102
Gorton Pond	Kent	41°42′19″N 71°27′30″W	62
Great Grass Pond	Kent	41°39′32″N 71°43′23″W	51
Great Salt Pond ~ Block Island	Washington	41°11′27″N 71°34′51″W	573
Green End Pond	Newport	41°29′58″N 71°17′22″W	110
Green Hill Pond	Washington	41°22′13″N 71°36′52″W	390
Greystone Mill Pond	Providence	41°52′00″N 71°29′34″W	13
Harrisville Pond	Providence	41°58′03″N 71°40′32″W	18
Hazard Pond	Kent	41°37′45″N 71°47′31″W	16
Hothouse Pond	Washington	41°24′36″N 71°32′33″W	12
Hughesdale Pond	Providence	41°48′29″N 71°30′12″W	5
Hundred Acre Pond	Washington	41°30′02″N 71°32′31″W	84
Indian Lake	Washington	41°28′47″N 71°28′10″W	200
Jamestown Reservoir (North Carr Pond)	Newport	41°31′52″N 71°22′23″W	26
Keech Pond	Providence	41°52′59″N 71°41′23″W	128
Kickemuit Reservoir (Warren Reservoir)	Bristol	41°44′14″N 71°15′46″W	42
Kimball Reservoir	Providence	41°50′13″N 71°33′48″W	28
King Pond	Providence	41°46′20″N 71°39′37″W	18
King Tom Pond	Washington	41°23′01″N 71°39′13″W	9
Lake Bel Air	Providence	41°57′18″N 71°35′01″W	7
Lake Mishnock	Kent	41°39′12″N 71°35′43″W	40
Lake Washington	Providence	41°54′58″N 71°45′41″W	41
Larkin Pond	Washington	41°28′12″N 71°33′29″W	42
Lawton Valley Reservoir	Newport	41°33′54″N 71°16′43″W	81
Little Grass Pond	Kent	41°39′52″N 71°44′17″W	8
Little Pond (Sandy Pond)	Kent	41°42′22″N 71°24′20″W	28
Locustville Pond	Washington	41°30′59″N 71°43′15″W	83
Long Pond (Hopkinton)	Washington	41°30′25″N 71°46′26″W	20
Long Pond (Little Compton)	Newport	41°27′56″N 71°10′44″W	41
Long Pond (South Kingstown)	Washington	41°24′38″N 71°33′13″W	39
Lymansville Mill Pond	Providence	41°50′25″N 71°28′40″W	25
Maple Root Pond	Kent	41°40′00″N 71°36′18″W	22
Maple Lake	Washington	41°26′34″N 71°37′18″W	14
Maschaug Pond	Washington	41°19′08″N 71°49′47″W	35
Mashapaug Pond	Providence	41°47′39″N 71°26′02″W	77
Matteson Pond	Kent	41°41′33″N 71°31′53″W	12
Manton Mill Pond	Providence	41°50′13″N 71°28′22″W	9
Middle Pond	Washington	41°12′58″N 71°34′28″W	16
Middle Dam Pond	Kent	41°42′06″N 71°33′13″W	8
Millbrook Pond	Washington	41°35′36″N 71°37′31″W	35
Mill Pond (Bristol)	Bristol	41°40′55″N 71°16′57″W	16
Mill Pond (South Kingstown)	Washington	41°23′36″N 71°34′23″W	8
Miscoe Lake	Providence	42°00′49″N 71°25′40″W	49
Melville Ponds	Newport	41°35′26″N 71°16′34″W	14
Moswansicut Pond	Providence	41°50′37″N 71°34′30″W	282
Mountaindale Reservoir	Providence	41°52′58″N 71°32′10″W	11
Nag Pond	Newport	41°37′42″N 71°19′12″W	19
Nelson Pond	Newport	41°29′37″N 71°15′45″W	30
Nichols Pond	Providence	41°57′12″N 71°36′04″W	24
Ninigret Pond	Washington	41°21′11″N 71°40′24″W	1,539
Nonquit Pond	Newport	41°33′47″N 71°11′46″W	196
Oak Swamp Reservoir	Providence	41°49′43″N 71°32′32″W	107
Olney Pond	Providence	41°53′29″N 71°25′53″W	133
Pascoag Reservoir (Echo Lake)	Providence	41°56′18″N 71°43′07″W	349
Pasquiset Pond	Washington	41°25′32″N 71°37′51″W	77
Peckham Pond	Washington	41°09′22″N 71°34′51″W	5
Pine Swamp Reservoir	Providence	41°49′06″N 71°34′15″W	37
Point Judith Pond	Washington	41°23′48″N 71°30′31″W	1,190
Polo Lake	Providence	41°47′13″N 71°24′55″W	
Ponaganset Reservoir	Providence	41°52′38″N 71°44′35″W	230
Potter Pond	Washington	41°23′22″N 71°31′56″W	321
Prince Pond	Bristol	41°44′37″N 71°19′08″W	
Quicksand Pond	Newport	41°30′20″N 71°07′49″W	392
Quidnick Reservoir	Kent	41°40′44″N 71°40′41″W	171
Quonochontaug Pond	Washington	41°20′25″N 71°43′35″W	747
Rainbow Ponds	Newport	41°32′49″N 71°22′06″W	
Randall Pond	Providence	41°47′19″N 71°28′08″W	34
Reynolds Pond	Kent	41°39′27″N 71°37′15″W	42
Roosevelt Lake	Providence	41°47′01″N 71°25′09″W	
Round Pond (Burrillville)	Providence	41°58′19″N 71°46′16″W	15
Round Pond (Little Compton)	Newport	41°27′47″N 71°11′14″W	34
Sachem Pond	Washington	41°13′19″N 71°34′12″W	80
Saint Marys Pond	Newport	41°33′17″N 71°16′13″W	117
Sands Pond	Washington	41°09′22″N 71°34′04″W	13
Schoolhouse Pond	Washington	41°24′10″N 71°40′01″W	96
Scituate Reservoir	Providence	41°45′39″N 71°35′41″W	3,392 (5.3 mi^{2})
Silver Lake	Washington	41°26′08″N 71°29′15″W	45
Simmons Pond	Newport	41°32′23″N 71°08′54″W	19
Simmons Reservoirs	Providence	41°47′49″N 71°31′08″W	109
Sisson Pond	Newport	41°33′07″N 71°16′38″W	90
Slack Reservoir (Slacks Pond)	Providence	41°51′42″N 71°33′08″W	150
Smith and Sayles Reservoir	Providence	41°53′41″N 71°40′36″W	173
Sneech Pond	Providence	41°58′54″N 71°27′11″W	99
Spectacle Pond	Providence	41°47′27″N 71°26′34″W	38
Sprague Lower Reservoir (Lake Wionkheige)	Providence	41°53′17″N 71°33′04″W	30
Sprague Pond	Washington	41°26′00″N 71°28′17″W	6
Sprague Upper Reservoir	Providence	41°53′35″N 71°33′51″W	23
Spring Lake	Providence	41°58′59″N 71°39′59″W	82
Stafford Pond	Newport	41°35′26″N 71°16′34″W	480
Stillwater Reservoir (Stump Pond)	Providence	41°54′25″N 71°32′48″W	240
Stump Pond	Kent	41°41′35″N 71°38′35″W	171
Tarbox Pond	Kent	41°38′06″N 71°34′07″W	30
Tarklin Pond	Providence	41°57′50″N 71°35′40″W	18
Thirty Acre Pond	Washington	41°29′29″N 71°32′42″W	15
Three Ponds	Kent	41°43′19″N 71°26′53″W	21
Tillinghast Pond	Kent	41°38′52″N 71°45′21″W	41
Tiogue Lake	Kent	41°40′42″N 71°33′02″W	267
Todds Pond	Providence	41°57′58″N 71°32′22″W	15
Tongue Pond	Providence	41°47′54″N 71°26′35″W	5
Trustom Pond	Washington	41°22′19″N 71°35′06″W	181
Tucker Pond	Washington	41°25′20″N 71°33′10″W	93
Tunipus Pond	Newport	41°29′49″N 71°08′24″W	48
Upper Dam Pond (Breezy Pond)	Kent	41°42′21″N 71°33′11″W	15
Wakefield Pond	Providence	41°57′47″N 71°47′32″W	71
Wallum Lake	Providence	42°00′30″N 71°47′10″W	208
Wanskuck Pond	Providence	41°51′27″N 71°26′22″W	12
Warwick Pond	Kent	41°43′24″N 71°24′43″W	85
Westconnaug Reservoir	Providence	41°45′52″N 71°40′53″W	174
Watchaug pond	Washington	41°23′01″N 71°42′35″W	573
Waterman Reservoir	Providence	41°52′43″N 71°34′56″W	270
Watson Reservoir (Pachet Brook Pond)	Newport	41°32′17″N 71°10′41″W	375
White Pond	Washington	41°24′54″N 71°32′44″W	26
Whitford Pond	Kent	41°40′06″N 71°43′26″W	38
Wickaboxet Pond	Kent	41°37′46″N 71°46′10″W	39
Wincheck Pond	Washington	41°31′03″N 71°46′09″W	150
Winnapaug Pond	Washington	41°23′01″N 71°42′35″W	476
Woonsocket Reservoir Number One	Providence	41°58′31″N 71°29′20″W	10
Woonsocket Reservoir Number Three	Providence	41°56′34″N 71°30′07″W	227
Worden Pond	Washington	41°26′19″N 71°35′02″W	1,043
Wyoming Lake	Washington	41°31′08″N 71°41′55″W	74
Yawgoo Mill Pond	Washington	41°31′21″N 71°31′18″W	16
Yawgoo Pond	Washington	41°30′40″N 71°34′20″W	143
Yawgoog Pond	Washington	41°31′12″N 71°47′03″W	161
