= Hazardville Historic District =

Historic district in Connecticut, United States

- U.S. National Register of Historic Places
- U.S. Historic district
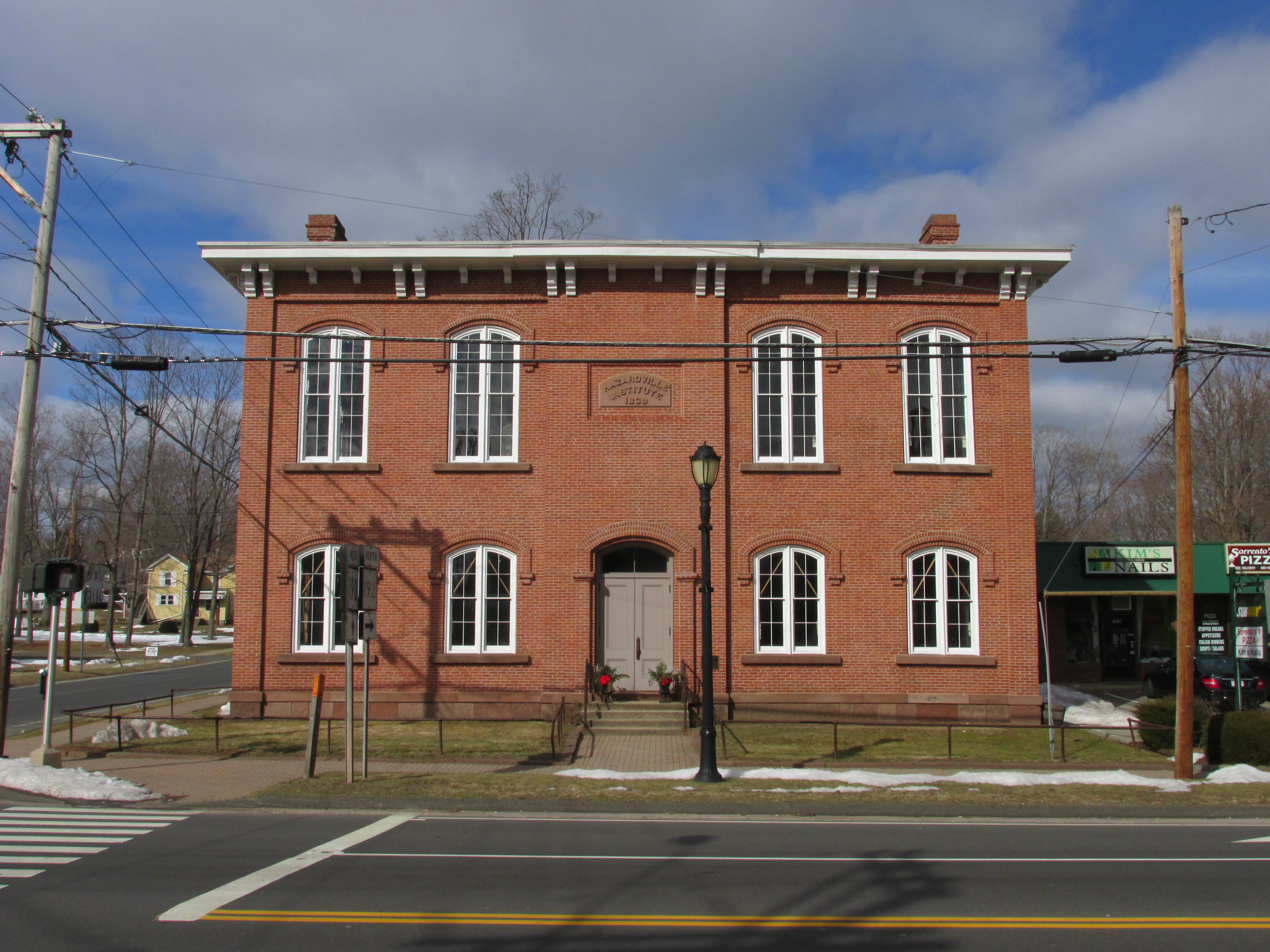
- Hazardville Institute, March 2013

- Location within Connecticut Location within the United States
- Location: CT 190 and CT 192, Hazardville, Connecticut and Vicinity
- Coordinates: 41°58′33″N 72°31′54″W
- Area: 1,075 acres (435 ha)
- Built: 1835
- Architect: Graham, Chauncey; Multiple
- Architectural style: Greek Revival, Renaissance, Italian Villa
- NRHP reference No.: 80004061
- Added to NRHP: February 19, 1980

The Hazardville Historic District is a historic district in the Hazardville section of Enfield, Connecticut, United States, that is listed on the National Register of Historic Places.

== Description ==
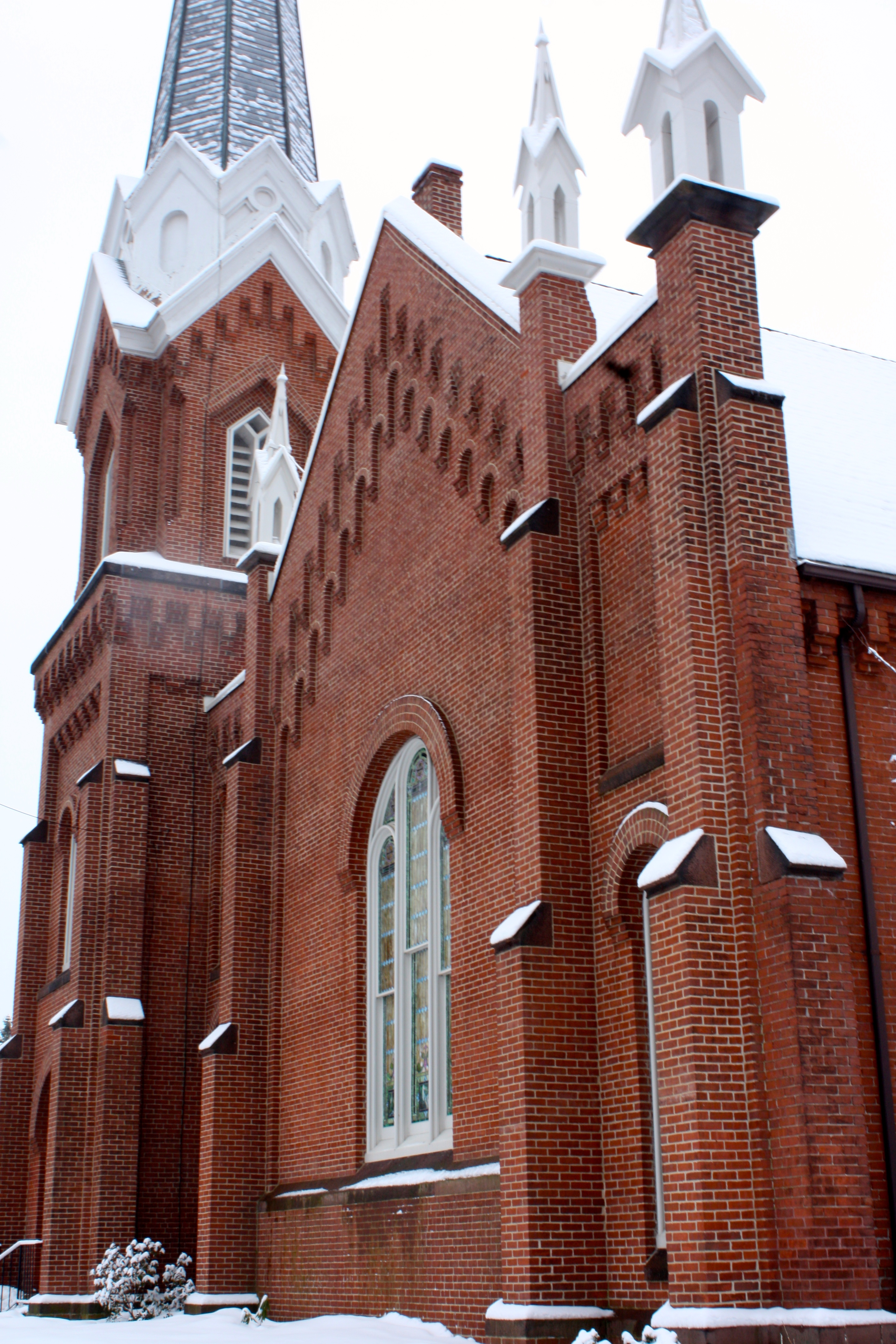
Hazardville United Methodist Church, February 2011

The district consists of what was essentially a company village associated with the manufacture of gunpowder between 1835 and 1913. It is an irregularly shaped area of historic resources that surround two interior areas that are not historical.

The historic district encompasses a section of Hazard Avenue (Connecticut Route 190 and adjacent roads, as well as a now-parklike section of the banks of the Scantic River, where the operations of the Hazard Powder Company were located. The district is dominated by four public buildings constructed of brick with brownstone trim: a public school, the Hazardville Institute, the former St. Mary's Episcopal Church, now incorporated as Holy Trinity Episcopal Church, and the Hazardville United Methodist Church. The school and the institute are both of Italian Renaissance Revival design and were built in 1864 and 1869, respectively. The Episcopal church is a Gothic Revival structure built in 1863. The Methodist church, built in 1872, is in the Romanesque Revival style.

The public school is now used as a day care center. A former horse barn of the Hazard Powder Company, located at 32 South Maple Avenue, was turned into a square dancing hall in 1959 and is now used as a venue for special events. The foundations of 21 buildings of the original gunpowder factory complex (originally 200 buildings) can still be found near the Scantic River within Scantic River State Park.

The Hazardville Institute building, at the corner of Hazard and Maple avenues, was used for many years as a public hall and community center. It was abandoned in the 1970s and was saved from demolition when it was leased to the Hazardville Institute Conservancy. The building is currently undergoing renovation. When renovation is complete, there are plans for the building to include an exhibit about the history of the Hazard Powder Company.

The district was listed on the National Register of Historic Places in 1980.

== Partial building listing ==
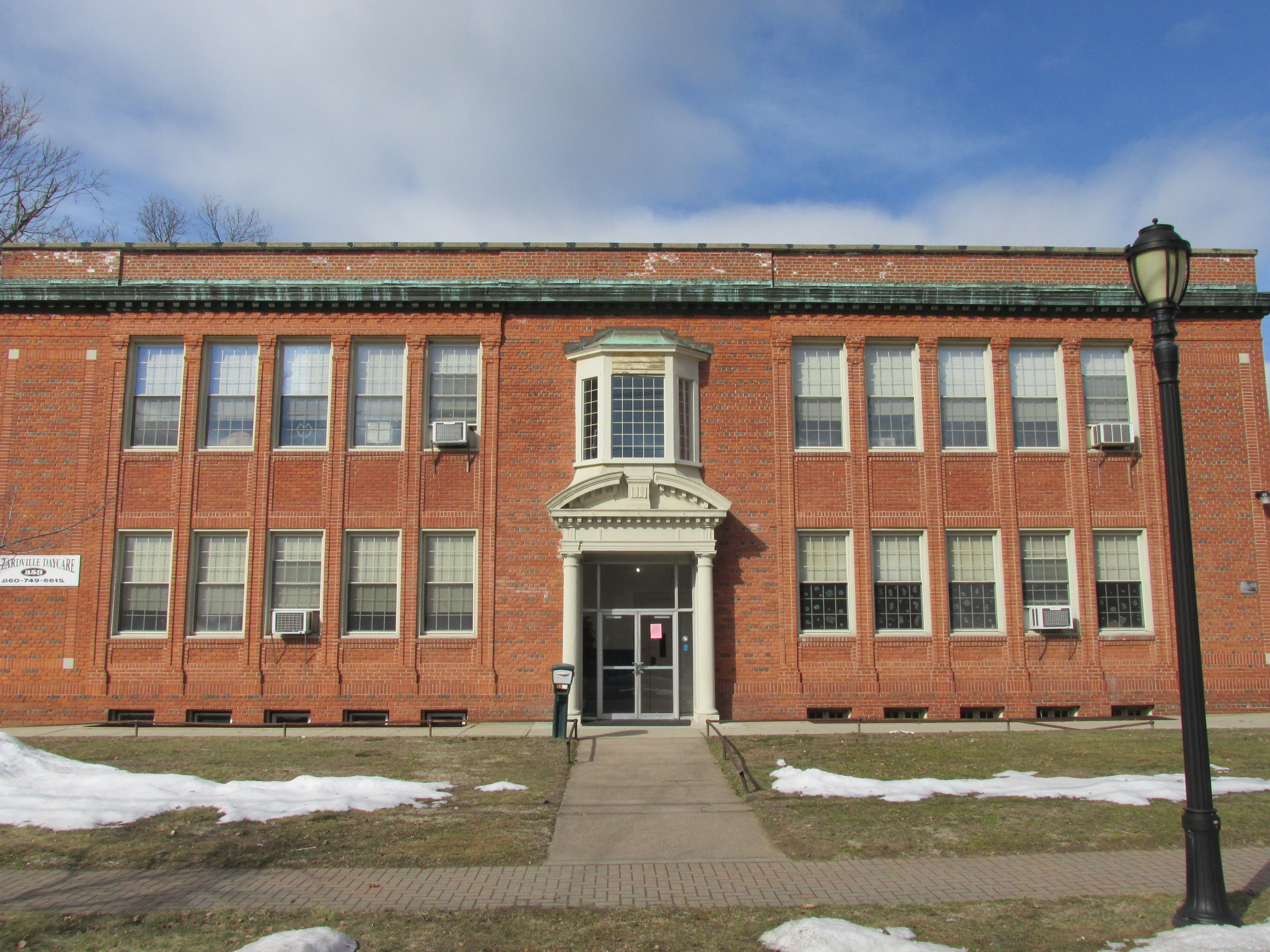
Hazardville Town Hall, March 2013

Other significant contributing properties in the district include:

- 7 Cooper Street, from 1850
- 9 Cooper Street, from 1850
- 269-271 Hazard Street, Greek Revival from 1840, with additional Greek Revival wing added later
- 273-275 Hazard Street, vernacular with Greek Revival elements, from 1845
- 325 Hazard Street, 1850, Greek Revival and Italianate
- 329 Hazard Street, 1865, Italianate and Second Empire
- 353-355 Hazard Street, 1850, Greek Revival
- Town Hall, 359 Hazard Avenue, Renaissance Revival (but tower and pavilion replaced by an addition in the 20th century)
- Old Methodist Church, 292-294-296-298 Hazard Avenue, c. 1830-1850, was prior Methodist church (see accompanying photo #9)
- 358 Hazard Avenue, 1850, Greek Revival
- Cedar Street Cemetery (see accompanying photo #8)
- St. Mary's Episcopal Church (see accompanying photo #11)
- Superintendent's House (see accompanying photo #15)
- Queen Anne house on School Street (see accompanying photo #17)
- Worker's house on Cedar Street (see accompanying photo #19)
- Cottage with wave molding (bargeboards) on South Maple Street (see accompanying photo #21)

== See also ==
- National Register of Historic Places listings in Hartford County, Connecticut
