= List of dam removals in Connecticut =

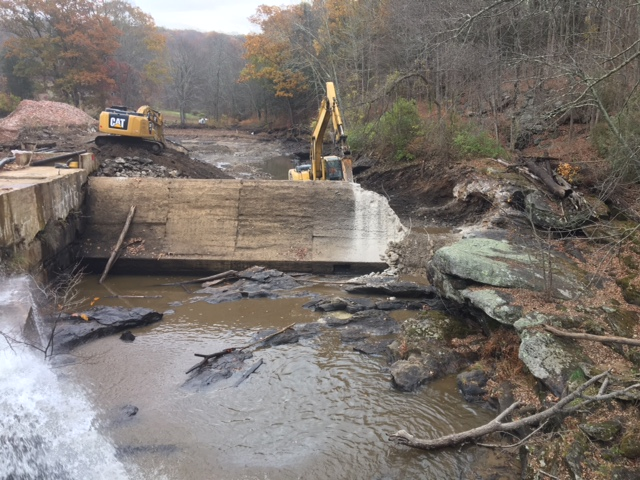
The 2016 removal of the Norton Paper Mill Dam from the Jeremy River in Colchester.

This is a list of dams in Connecticut that have been removed as physical impediments to free-flowing rivers or streams.

== Removals by watershed ==
=== Farmington River ===
The Spoonville Dam was a hydropower dam on the Farmington River that had partially washed out in 1955, forcing the water to flow rapidly through a narrow notch. The dam was removed in 2012 to improve boat safety and to allow fish to swim upstream to spawn.

=== Housatonic River ===
Roraback Pond Dam was a 510-foot (160 m) long earthen dam owned by the Connecticut Department of Energy and Environmental Protection impounding a 0.83-acre (0.34 ha) pond on a tributary to Leadmine Brook, itself a tributary of the Housatonic River. The dam was in severe disrepair and was breached in 2021 to remove maintenance and liability concerns, as well as for stream restoration.

== Completed removals ==
Dam	Height	Year removed	Location	Watercourse	Watershed
Unnamed dam	11 ft (3.4 m)	1993		Bradley Brook	
Muddy Pond Dam	8 ft (2.4 m)	1992		Muddy Brook	
Little Pond Dam	10 ft (3.0 m)	1994		Tributary to Bigelow Creek	
Spoonville Dam	25 ft (7.6 m)	2012	East Granby; 41.9012°N 72.7568°W	Farmington River	Farmington River
Lower Pond Dam	12 ft (3.7 m)	1991	Wolcott; 41.634°N 72.9611°W	Cedar Swamp Brook	Housatonic River
Old Papermill Pond Dam	9.8 ft (3.0 m)	2019	New Milford; 41.6079°N 73.4119°W	East Aspetuck River	Housatonic River
Roraback Pond Dam	14.3 ft (4.4 m)	2021	Harwinton; 41.7289°N 73.0521°W	Tributary to Leadmine Brook	Housatonic River
John Dee's Dam	17 ft (5.2 m)		Waterbury; 41.5503°N 73.024°W	Mad River	Housatonic River
Century Brass Dam		2016	Waterbury; 41.539°N 73.0146°W	Mad River	Housatonic River
Union City Dam	16 ft (4.9 m)	1999	Naugatuck; 41.4959°N 73.053°W	Naugatuck River	Housatonic River
Anaconda Dam	11 ft (3.4 m)	1999	Waterbury; 41.5724°N 73.0533°W	Naugatuck River	Housatonic River
Freight Street Dam	2 ft (0.61 m)	1999	Waterbury; 41.5535°N 73.0525°W	Naugatuck River	Housatonic River
Platts Mill Dam	10 ft (3.0 m)	1999	Waterbury; 41.5195°N 73.0513°W	Naugatuck River	Housatonic River
Chase Brass Dam	4 ft (1.2 m)	2004	Watertown; 41.5984°N 73.0605°W	Naugatuck River	Housatonic River
Heminway Pond Dam	14 ft (4.3 m)	2018	Watertown	Steele Brook	Housatonic River
Blackledge River Dam	11 ft (3.4 m)	2018	Glastonbury	Blackledge River	Lower Connecticut River
Ed Bills Pond Dam	11 ft (3.4 m)	2015	Lyme; 41.4268°N 72.3318°W	East Branch Eightmile River	Lower Connecticut River
Zemko Dam	5 ft (1.5 m)	2007	Salem; 41.494°N 72.2834°W	East Branch Eightmile River	Lower Connecticut River
Pizzini Dam	4.5 ft (1.4 m)	2005	East Haddam; 41.4336°N 72.335°W	Eightmile River	Lower Connecticut River
Norton Paper Mill Dam	20 ft (6.1 m)	2016	Colchester; 41.5802°N 72.4017°W	Jeremy River	Lower Connecticut River
Raymond Brook Pond Dam	4 ft (1.2 m)	2007	Amston; 41.6149°N 72.3678°W	Raymond Brook	Lower Connecticut River
Slocomb Pond Dam	12 ft (3.7 m)	2020	Glastonbury; 41.6635°N 72.5794°W	Roaring Brook	Lower Connecticut River
Scantic River Dam (Springborn Dam)	26 ft (7.9 m)	2017	Hazardville; 41.9831°N 72.5185°W	Scantic River	Lower Connecticut River
Karp Family Dam		2015	Suffield; 41.9622°N 72.6305°W	Stony Brook	Lower Connecticut River
Indian Lake Dam	12 ft (3.7 m)	1994	Clinton; 41.2869°N 72.5257°W	Indian River	Indian River
Hyde Pond	4.8 ft (1.5 m)	2015	Stonington and Groton; 41.3966°N 71.9594°W	Whitford Brook	Mystic River
Flock Process Dam	15 ft (4.6 m)	2018	Norwalk; 41.1398°N 73.4269°W	Norwalk River	Norwalk River
White Rock Dam	6 ft (1.8 m)	2015	Stonington; 41.4059°N 71.8434°W	Pawcatuck River	Pawcatuck River
Murphy Dam		2009	Putnam; 41.9153°N 71.9173°W	Little River	Quinebaug River
Sprucedale Water Dam	10 ft (3.0 m)	1980	Woodstock; 41.9349°N 71.9795°W	Mill Brook	Quinebaug River
Moosup Dam #1	6 ft (1.8 m)	2014	Plainfield; 41.7176°N 71.9012°W	Moosup River	Quinebaug River
Griswold Rubber Dam	4 ft (1.2 m)	2015	Plainfield; 41.7159°N 71.8784°W	Moosup River	Quinebaug River
Brunswick Mill #1 Dam	4 ft (1.2 m)	2017	Plainfield; 41.7176°N 71.861°W	Moosup River	Quinebaug River
Carpenter Dam	6 ft (1.8 m)	2016	Meriden and Cheshire; 41.5273°N 72.8571°W	Quinnipiac River	Quinnipiac River
Clark Brothers Dam	5 ft (1.5 m)	2016	Southington; 41.571°N 72.8967°W	Quinnipiac River	Quinnipiac River
Woodings Pond Dam	15 ft (4.6 m)	1971	Wallingford; 41.4746°N 72.8312°W	Tributary to Quinnipiac River	Quinnipiac River
Simpson's Pond Dam	8 ft (2.4 m)	1995	Wallingford; 41.4512°N 72.8094°W	Wharton Brook	Quinnipiac River
Main Street Dam	9.3 ft (2.8 m)	2010	Stamford; 41.053°N 73.5457°W	Rippowam River	Rippowam River
Frankel Dams	6 ft (1.8 m)	2011	Westport; 41.1843°N 73.3471°W	Aspetuck River	Saugatuck River
Post Office Dam	6 ft (1.8 m)	2019	Sprague; 41.6167°N 72.0848°W	Beaver Brook	Shetucket River
Baltic Mills Dam	26 ft (7.9 m)	1938	Baltic; 41.6175°N 72.0848°W	Shetucket River	Shetucket River
Talbot Wildlife Management Area Dam	4 ft (1.2 m)	2015	Scotland	Merrick Branch	Shetucket River
Picker Pond Dam	28 ft (8.5 m)	2021	Montville; 41.4442°N 72.1208°W	Oxoboxo River	Thames River
Uncasville Mill Dam		2020	Montville; 41.4372°N 72.1097°W	Oxoboxo River	Thames River
Rutan Dam	9 ft (2.7 m)	2012	Stonington; 41.3677°N 71.8652°W	Anguilla Brook	Wequetequock Cove
Pond Lily Dam	6 ft (1.8 m)	2015	New Haven; 41.3355°N 72.9756°W	West River	West River
