= Scantic =

Scantic may refer to

== Places ==
- Scantic, Connecticut
- Scantic River State Park, Massachusetts

== Rivers ==
- Scantic River, Massachusetts

== Ships ==
- MV Scantic, a Danish coaster in service 1963-64
