= Cards Pond =

Lagoon in Rhode Island, United States

- Location within Rhode Island
- Location: South Kingstown, Washington County, Rhode Island
- Group: Salt Ponds of Rhode Island
- Coordinates: 41°22′25″N 71°34′03″W
- Type: saline
- Primary inflows: precipitation, groundwater
- Primary outflows: to sea, breaches 8-10 times a year
- Catchment area: 1,979.76 acres (8.0118 km^{2})
- Basin countries: United States
- Surface area: 40.95 acres (16.57 ha)
- Average depth: 1.3 ft (0.40 m)

Cards Pond, or Card Pond, is a coastal lagoon in South Kingstown, Washington County, Rhode Island, United States.

== Coastal lagoon ==
It is one of nine coastal lagoons (often referred to as "salt ponds") in southern Rhode Island. According to the Rhode Island Sea Grant program, "[i]ts breachway is only intermittently open to the sea", and it receives large quantities of freshwater from Moonstone Stream; only two other salt ponds, Point Judith and Greenhill, have significant streams flowing into them. It is partially within the Trustom Pond National Wildlife Refuge, which is inhabited by over 360 species of animals.

== Watershed ==
Cards Pond's watershed covers 1,979.76 acres (801.18 ha), of which 59.06 acres (23.90 ha) is occupied by water; the pond itself has a surface area of 40.95 acres (16.57 ha), while other, smaller bodies of water account for the other 18.11 acres (7.33 ha). The pond averages 1.3 ft (0.40 m) deep, and has a salinity level of approximately 4 parts per thousand, too low to sustain the growth of eelgrass. It has been classified as "non-tidal except when breached by storms". The water directly receives about 51,196,553 gallons of precipitation per year, and at least 1,592,165 gallons of daily groundwater flow. Cards Pond, like others in the region, was "formed after the recession of the glaciers 12,000 years ago". Nests of piping plovers, which are federally designated as a threatened species, have been documented within the watershed.

== Flooding ==
The land surrounding Cards Pond is low-lying, and particularly vulnerable to severe flooding. However, compared to other ponds in the region, damage from future storms is projected to be minimal. It typically breaches around 9 times each year, spilling into the Block Island Sound. When the pond threatens to flood a nearby road or surrounding houses, a breach is intentionally created by the U.S. Fish and Wildlife Service.

== See also ==
- List of lakes in Rhode Island
- Geography of Rhode Island
