= Potter Pond =

Lake in Washington County, Rhode Island, United States

- Location within Rhode Island
- Location: Washington County, Rhode Island, United States
- Coordinates: 41.3873242°N 71.5311693°W
- Type: saline
- Basin countries: United States

Potter Pond (formerly Fish Pond) is a saltwater pond in the town of South Kingstown, Washington County, Rhode Island, United States. Its tidal inlet connects to Point Judith Pond. It is one of nine coastal lagoons, referred to as "salt ponds" by locals, in southern Rhode Island.

== See also ==
- List of lakes in Rhode Island
- Geography of Rhode Island
