= Abbott Run =

River in Massachusetts and Rhode Island, United States

Coordinates: 41°57′7″N 71°22′56″W

Location
- Country: United States
- States: Massachusetts, Rhode Island

Physical characteristics
- Source: Miscoe Lake
  - location: Wrentham, Massachusetts / Cumberland, Rhode Island
- Mouth: Blackstone River
  - location: Valley Falls, Rhode Island
- Length: 10 mi (16 km)

Basin features
- Tributaries
  - left: Burnt Swamp Brook
  - right: Millers River

Abbott Run is a de facto river in the U.S. state of Massachusetts and Rhode Island. It flows approximately 10 miles (16 km).

== Course ==
The river rises from Miscoe Lake on the border of Wrentham, Massachusetts and Cumberland, Rhode Island, then flows south through Cumberland, Rhode Island where it provides water to numerous ponds, including Diamond Hill Reservoir, Arnold Mills Reservoir and Rawson Pond. It then flows back into Massachusetts and flows south through North Attleborough, past the village of Adamsdale. From there, the river flows back into Rhode Island and continues through Cumberland, providing water to Robin Hollow and Happy Hollow Ponds before flowing into the Blackstone River at the village of Valley Falls.

== Crossings ==
Below is a list of all crossings over Abbott Run. The list starts at the headwaters and heads downstream.

- Wrentham
  - West Street (MA 121)
- Cumberland
  - Sumner Brown Road
  - Reservoir Road
  - Sneech Pond Road
  - Nate Whipple Highway (RI 120)
  - Rawson Road
  - Howard Road
  - Interstate 295
- North Attleborough
  - Hunts Bridge Road
  - Cushman Road
  - Mendon Road
- Cumberland
  - Dexter Street (RI 123)
  - Mill Street

== Tributaries ==
Burnt Swamp Brook and the Millers River are the only two named tributaries of Abbott Run, though it has many unnamed streams that also feed it.

== See also ==
- List of rivers in Massachusetts
- List of rivers in Rhode Island
- Millers River
