= North Cape oil spill =

1996 oil spill in the United States

Coordinates: 41°22′7″N 71°34′37″W

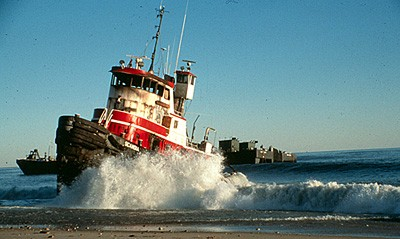
Tug Scandia and tank barge North Cape January 20, 1996

The North Cape oil spill took place on Friday, January 19, 1996, when the tank barge North Cape and the tug Scandia grounded on Moonstone Beach in South Kingstown, Rhode Island, after the tug caught fire in its engine room during a winter storm. An estimated 828,000 US gallons (3,130 m^{3}) of home heating oil was spilled. Oil spread throughout a large area of Block Island Sound, including Trustom Pond National Wildlife Refuge, resulting in the closure of a 250-square-mile (650 km^{2}) area of the sound for fishing.

Hundreds of oiled birds and large numbers of dead lobsters, surf clams, and starfish were recovered in the weeks following the spill. US federal and Rhode Island state governments undertook considerable work to clean up the spill and restore lost fishery stocks and coastal marine habitat. The North Cape oil spill is considered a significant legal precedent in that it was the first major oil spill in the continental U.S. after the passage of the Oil Pollution Act of 1990, resulting from the Exxon Valdez oil spill in Alaska on March 24, 1989.

== Environmental impacts ==
Of the many affected communities, one important habitat was the Trustom Pond National Wildlife Refuge. The refuge is nearly 800 acres (320 ha) in area and protects the only undeveloped salt pond in the state and its inhabitants. The oil caused a large number of deaths in wildlife such as birds, lobsters, surf clams and sea stars. More than 2,000 birds were killed, one of these species being the piping plover, a federally listed threatened species. The wind and choppy waters of the storm in combination with the oil caused a rapid and foamy dispersion of the oil into the water column. As a result, a large number of shellfish washed ashore in the few days following the spill. Because of the complex interconnected nature of the marine ecosystem, the effects on one species eventually spread to every level of the food chain in that environment. Even small and uncommon species can serve as keystone species for the ecosystem, determining the functionality of the community as a whole.

== Social and economic impacts ==
Humans were affected by the disturbance in several ways such as temporary loss of the fishing industry and financial strain. Residents and tourists alike depend on the coastal environment for both recreational and economical pursuits. More than 200 square miles (500 km^{2}) of commercial fishery were closed for several months following the spill and some seafood businesses were unable to make up the economic losses from that time out of work. Over a year after the spill, the owners of the tug and barge were given criminal charges because the Oil Pollution act of 1990 had made it illegal to negligently discharge harmful quantities of oil into the United States' navigable waters. The owners paid a total of $9.5 million in criminal and other costs.

== Recovery efforts ==
As a result of the severe weather during the time of the spill, the oil spread quickly to the deeper levels of water, making cleaning up more difficult and the skimming method less effective. Several organizations worked together to create a restoration plan following the spill at the behest of the Rhode Island House of Representatives. The primary organizations involved were the National Oceanic and Atmospheric Administration, the United States Fish and Wildlife Service, the Rhode Island Department of Environmental Management, and the United States Coast Guard. Captain Patrick A. Turlo was the commander on science for the Coast Guard. This was the first oil spill whose damages were to be assessed by the new federal regulations of the Oil Pollution Act of 1990, a law designed to compensate the public for losses resulting from an oil spill. Projects included restocking wildlife populations and protecting and enhancing their habitats. The total project cost was $117 million. This incident and other disturbances have illustrated the need to improve both the ecological and social resilience of coastal environments. Many organizations were involved to find a solution to the disaster, and to find a way to clean up all the oil from the deep levels of the sound.

== See also ==
- List of oil spills
