= List of dams and reservoirs in Rhode Island =

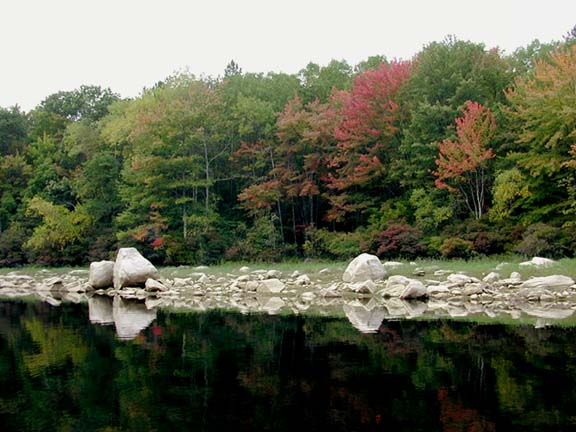
Scituate Reservoir

Following is a list of dams and reservoirs in Rhode Island.

All major dams are linked below. The National Inventory of Dams defines any "major dam" as being 50 feet (15 m) tall with a storage capacity of at least 5,000 acre-feet (6,200,000 m^{3}), or of any height with a storage capacity of 25,000 acre-feet (31,000,000 m^{3}).

== Dams and reservoirs in Rhode Island ==
Manville Dam on the Blackstone River.

This list is incomplete. You can help Wikipedia by expanding it.

- Diamond Hill Reservoir Dam, Diamond Hill Reservoir, City of Pawtucket
- Gainer Memorial Dam, Scituate Reservoir, City of Providence

== See also ==
- List of dam removals in Rhode Island
