= List of dam removals in Rhode Island =

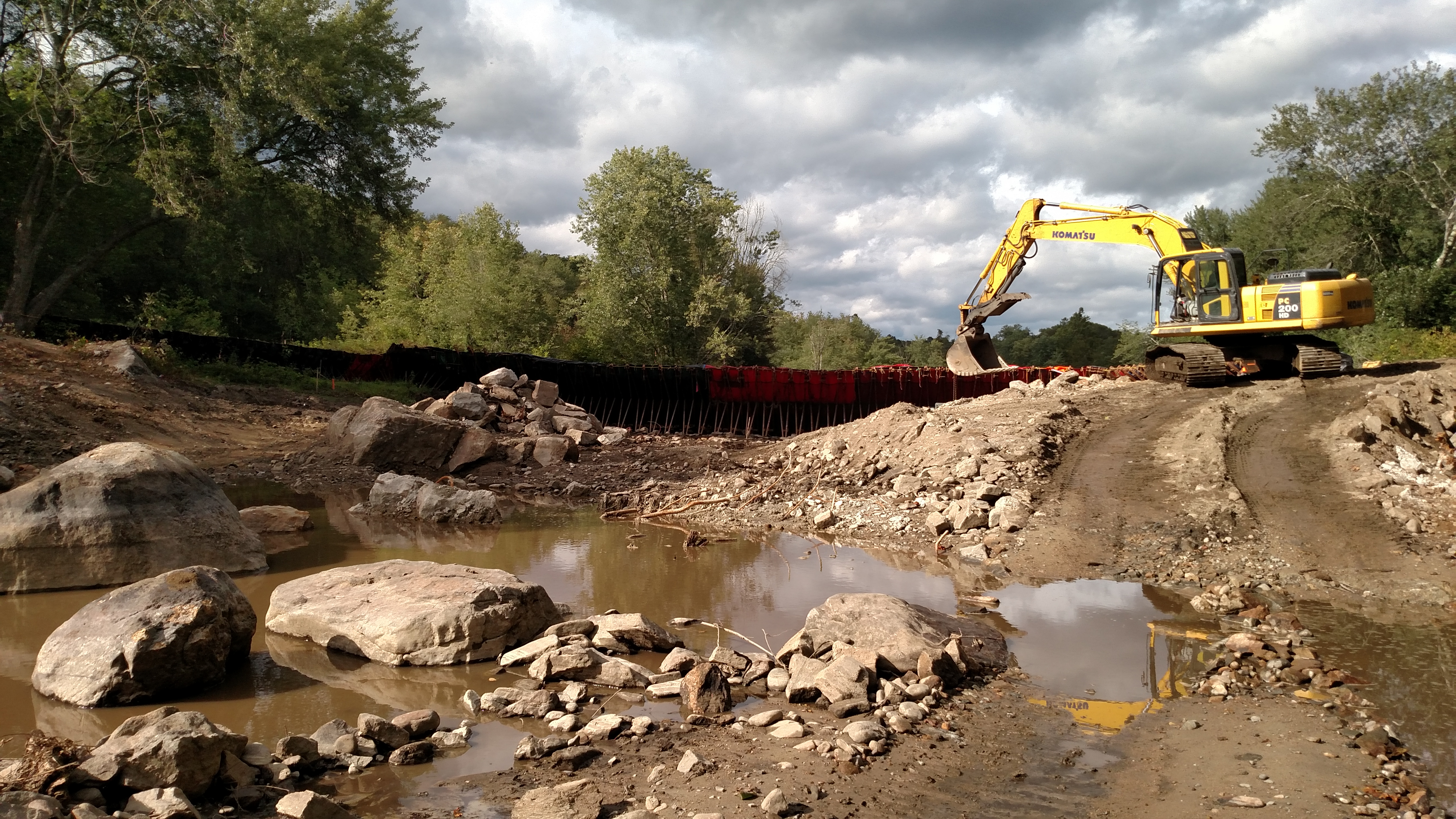
The removal of the White Rock Dam from the Pawcatuck River in Westerly in 2015.

This is a list of dams in Rhode Island that have been removed as physical impediments to free-flowing rivers or streams.

== Completed removals ==
Dam	Height	Year removed	Location	Watercourse	Watershed
Shady Lea Mill Pond Dam		2018	North Kingstown; 41.5336°N 71.4637°W	Mattatuxet River	Pettaquamscutt River
Pawtuxet Falls Dam	5 ft (1.5 m)	2011	Cranston and Warwick; 41.7644°N 71.3909°W	Pawtuxet River	Pawtuxet River
Jackson Pond Dam	20 ft (6.1 m)	1979	Hope; 41.7342°N 71.5539°W	North Branch Pawtuxet River	Pawtuxet River
Dyerville Dam		2009	Providence; 41.8277°N 71.4625°W	Woonasquatucket River	Providence River
Paragon Dam		2010	Providence; 41.8183°N 71.4421°W	Woonasquatucket River	Providence River
Bradford Dam	6 ft (1.8 m)	2017	Ashaway; 41.4076°N 71.7494°W	Pawcatuck River	Pawcatuck River
Lower Shannock Falls Dam		2010	Richmond and Charlestown; 41.4473°N 71.6433°W	Pawcatuck River	Pawcatuck River
White Rock Dam	6 ft (1.8 m)	2015	Westerly; 41.4059°N 71.8434°W	Pawcatuck River	Pawcatuck River

== See also ==
- List of dam removals in Massachusetts
- List of dam removals in Connecticut
