= Waterman Reservoir =

Reservoir in Rhode Island, U.S.

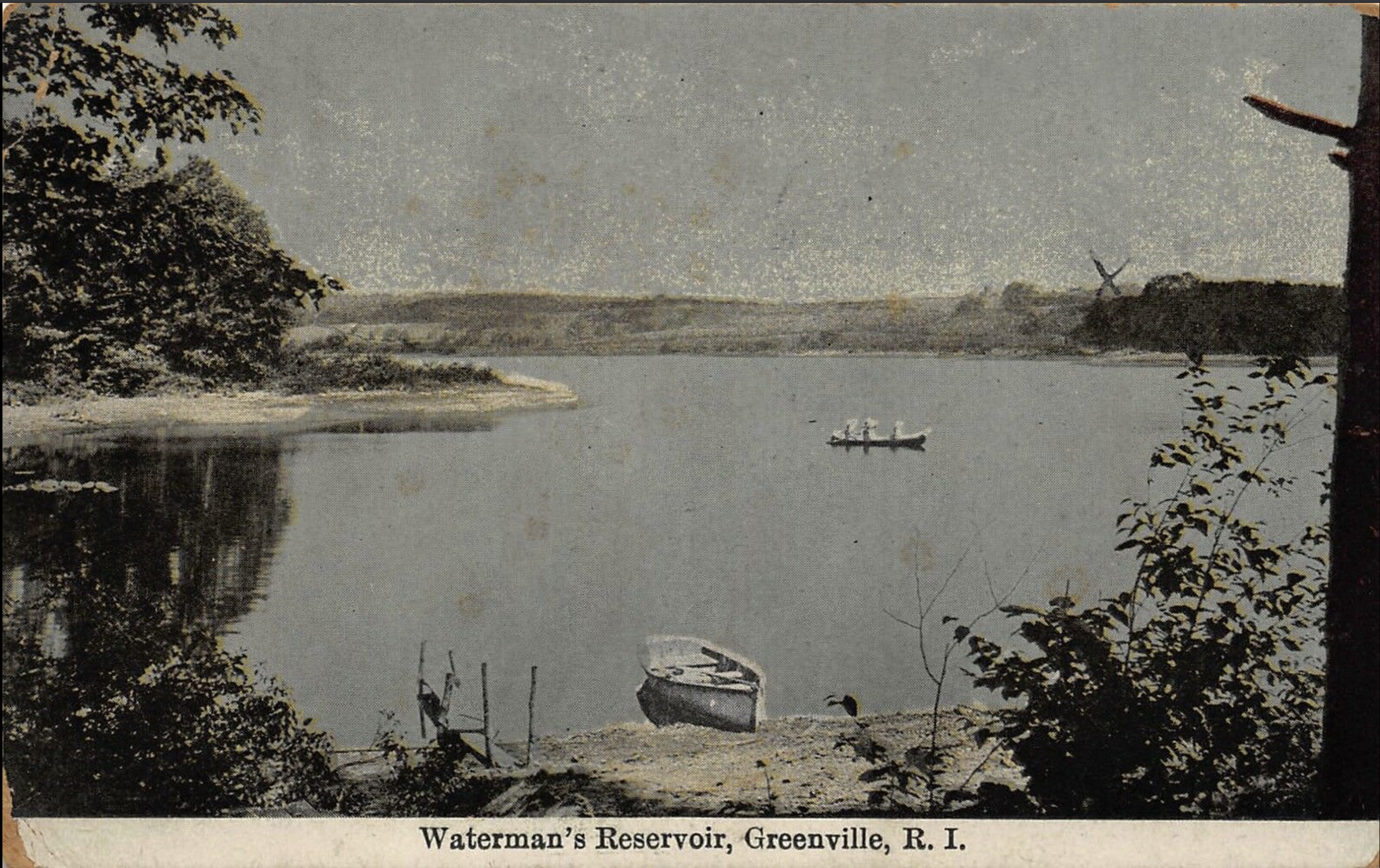

- Location within Rhode Island
- Location: Glocester, Providence County, Rhode Island
- Coordinates: 41°52′45″N 71°34′55″W
- Type: Artificial lake
- Basin countries: United States
- Surface area: 318 acres (129 ha)
- Average depth: 9 ft (2.7 m)
- Max. depth: 12 ft (4 m)
- Surface elevation: 330 ft (100 m)

Waterman Reservoir (also known as Waterman's Reservoir) is a large lake along Putnam Pike in Glocester and Greenville in Providence County, Rhode Island.

The Waterman Reservoir was created in 1838 on the site of a swamp and is 318 acres (129 ha) when full with an average depth of nine feet (2.7 m). It was named after Resolved Waterman, an early eighteenth century Greenville resident and landowner. Prior to the creation of the reservoir, the area was swampy, so a dam was constructed to create the reservoir and at the same time a causeway (now part of the Putnam Pike) was built so travelers no longer had to go around the swamp using Austin Avenue, which prior to the 1930s was known as (Old) Killingly Road.

== See also ==
- List of lakes in Rhode Island
