= Great Salt Pond Archeological District =

Historic district in Rhode Island, United States

- U.S. National Register of Historic Places
- U.S. Historic district
- Nearest city: New Shoreham, Rhode Island
- MPS: Indian Use of Block Island, 500 BC–AD 1676 MPS
- NRHP reference No.: 90000107
- Added to NRHP: February 15, 1990

The Great Salt Pond Archeological District is a historic district in New Shoreham, Rhode Island. The district was added to the National Register of Historic Places in 1990.

The Great Salt Pond, Rhode Island, is a round and almost entirely enclosed body of water separating the north and south regions of Block Island. The pond has a small channel on its north west shore connecting it with Block Island Sound. The opening is artificial and was dug out in 1895 to make a harbor in the south part of the pond.

The shores of the pond have a long history of human use, as the area was one of the primary areas of residence by Native Americans both before and after contact with Europeans. Evidence of occupation dates as far back as the Middle Woodland Period, and includes the site of a palisaded fortification.

== Salt Pond village site ==
In 1987, while conducting a survey for a development company, archaeologists from Rhode Island College discovered the remains of an Indian village dating from 1100 to 1300 CE on a site northeast of Point Judith Pond, adjacent to the land where the Salt Pond Shopping Center was subsequently built. The archaeological site has since been purchased by the state of Rhode Island, is known as the Salt Pond site or Salt Pond Preserve, and is designated in the Rhode Island Historical Preservation & Heritage Commission inventory of recorded archaeological sites as site RI 110. Excavations revealed the remains of a coastal village from the Late Woodland period, inhabited by about 100 people for about four years, sometime in the tenth or eleventh centuries CE. Evidence of houses and other structures was found, as well as food storage pits, and evidence of maize farming. The find is important, because no other Native American coastal village has ever been found in the Northeastern United States. A documentary film about the site was sponsored by the Rhode Island Department of Transportation, with support from the Federal Highway Administration, and aired on Rhode Island PBS in November 2015.

Further archaeological excavation on the site quickly revealed that it was one of two villages on the Atlantic Coast to be found in such complete condition. The other pre-Columbian village (Otan in Narragansett Algonquin) is in Virginia. It has a high concentration of permanent structures.

Preliminary surveys of the Narragansett tract, known as RI 110, have revealed a village with perhaps as many 22 structures, as well as three known human burial sites. There is also evidence of granaries, ceremonial areas and storage pits that may shed new light on the importance of maize agriculture to woodland tribes.

Historians and archeologists knew that maize was cultivated by Algonquin tribes, but there has never been physical evidence before the discovery of this site. The tribe's method of grinding the kernels into a powder was not conducive to preservation. In the first week of excavation, 78 kernels of corn were found at this site, the first time that cultivation of maize could be confirmed this far north on the Atlantic Coast.

The current citizens of the Narragansett Indian Tribe have contributed through oral history to accounts about the ancient people who inhabited this site. They were members of the Turtle Clan, and the settlement was a conduit for trade in medicines. They used the surrounding pond and its many islands for hunting camps, resource collection, fishing, shellfish, burial sites, and herbal collections for medicine and ceremony.

== See also ==
- National Register of Historic Places listings in Washington County, Rhode Island
