= Millers River (Rhode Island) =

River in eastern Rhode Island, United States

Coordinates: 41.9332°N 71.3894°W

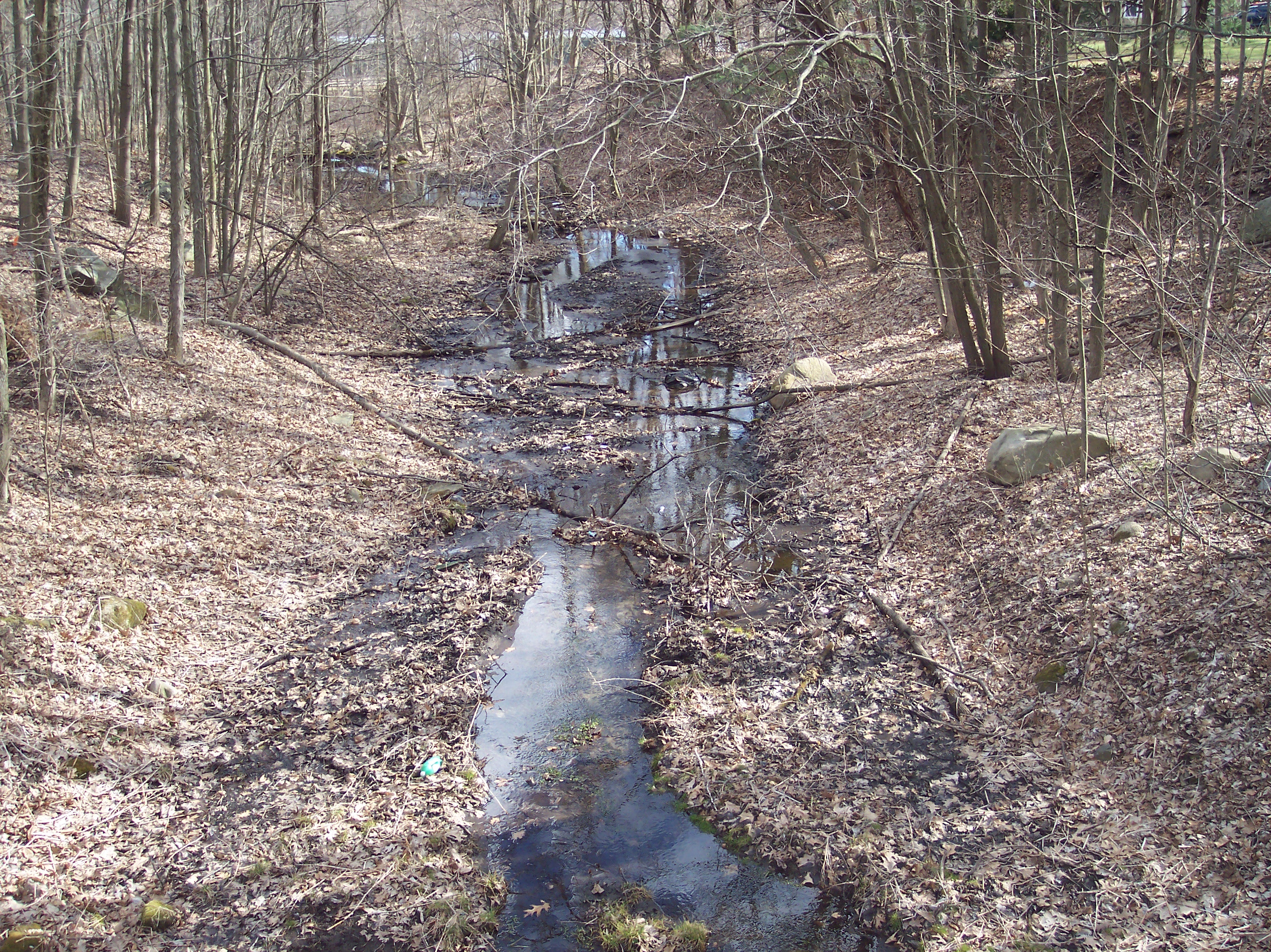
The Millers River near its headwaters in Cumberland, Rhode Island.

The Millers River is a river in the eastern section of the U.S. state of Rhode Island. It flows approximately 3 km (2 mi). There are no dams along the river's length.

== Course ==
The river rises from an unnamed pond, now known as Friars' Cirque, Ea. along Bear Hill Road in Cumberland and flows due south to its confluence with Abbott Run at Robin Hollow Pond.

== Crossings ==
Below is a list of all crossings over the Millers River. The list starts at the headwaters and goes downstream.

- Cumberland
  - Bear Hill Road
  - Oakledge Road
  - Curran Road

== Tributaries ==
The Millers River has no named tributaries, though it has many unnamed streams that also feed it.

== See also ==
- List of rivers in Rhode Island
