= Silver Lake (Washington County, Rhode Island) =

Lake in Washington County, Rhode Island, United States

- Kitts Pond
- Location within Rhode Island Location within the United States
- Location: South Kingstown, Washington County, Rhode Island, US
- Coordinates: 41.434546°N 71.490335°W
- Basin countries: United States
- Surface elevation: 20 ft (6 m)
- Settlements: Wakefield

Silver Lake or Kitts Pond is a lake at Wakefield in Washington County, Rhode Island, United States. It is considered part of the Saugatucket River watershed, although it does not discharge into the Saugatucket River itself.
