= Indian River (Connecticut) =

River in Connecticut, USA

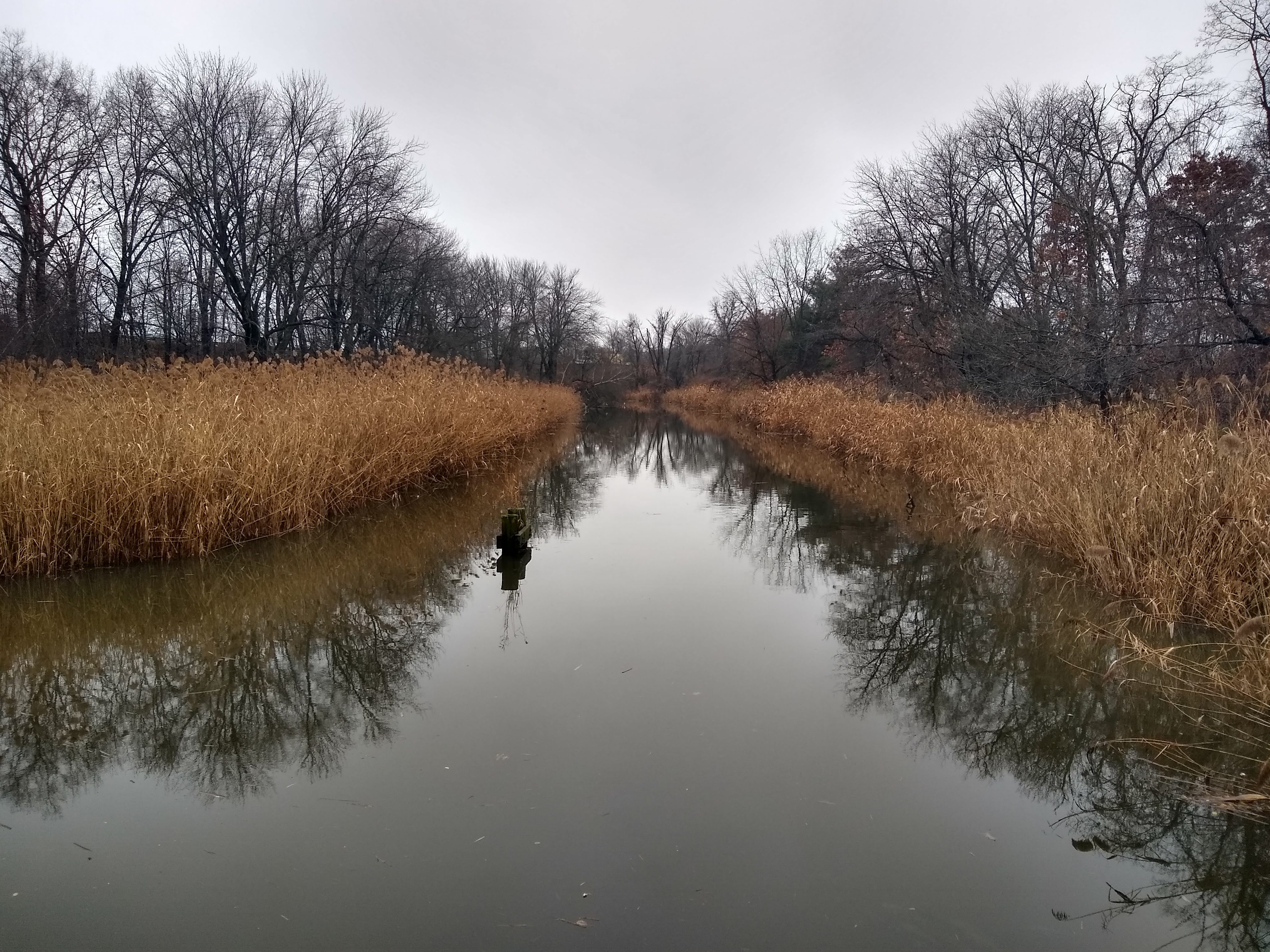
- Indian River in Milford, Connecticut.

Location
- Country: United States
- State: Connecticut
- County: New Haven

Physical characteristics
- Source: Orange, Connecticut
- Mouth: Long Island Sound
  - location: Milford, Connecticut
  - coordinates: 41°13′36″N 73°02′11″W

The Indian River is a stream in New Haven County in the U.S. state of Connecticut. It rises in Orange and flows through Milford before discharging into Long Island Sound at Gulf Pond.

Bodies of water along the stream include Clark Pond and Roses Mill Pond in Milford and Indian Lake bordering Milford and Orange. Stubbly Plain Brook and Silver Brook are tributaries. Fish supported by the stream include the American eel and alewife. A fish ladder helps fish reach spawning grounds at Clark's Pond.

== See also ==
- List of rivers of Connecticut
