= White Pond =

- Location within New York
- Location: Putnam County, New York
- Coordinates: 41.501°N 73.723°W
- Type: lake
- Surface area: 150 acres (61 ha)

White Pond is a lake in Putnam County, in the U.S. state of New York. The pond has a surface area of 150 acres (61 ha).

White Pond was named after the local White family.
