= Quicksand Pond =

Pond in Little Compton, Rhode Island

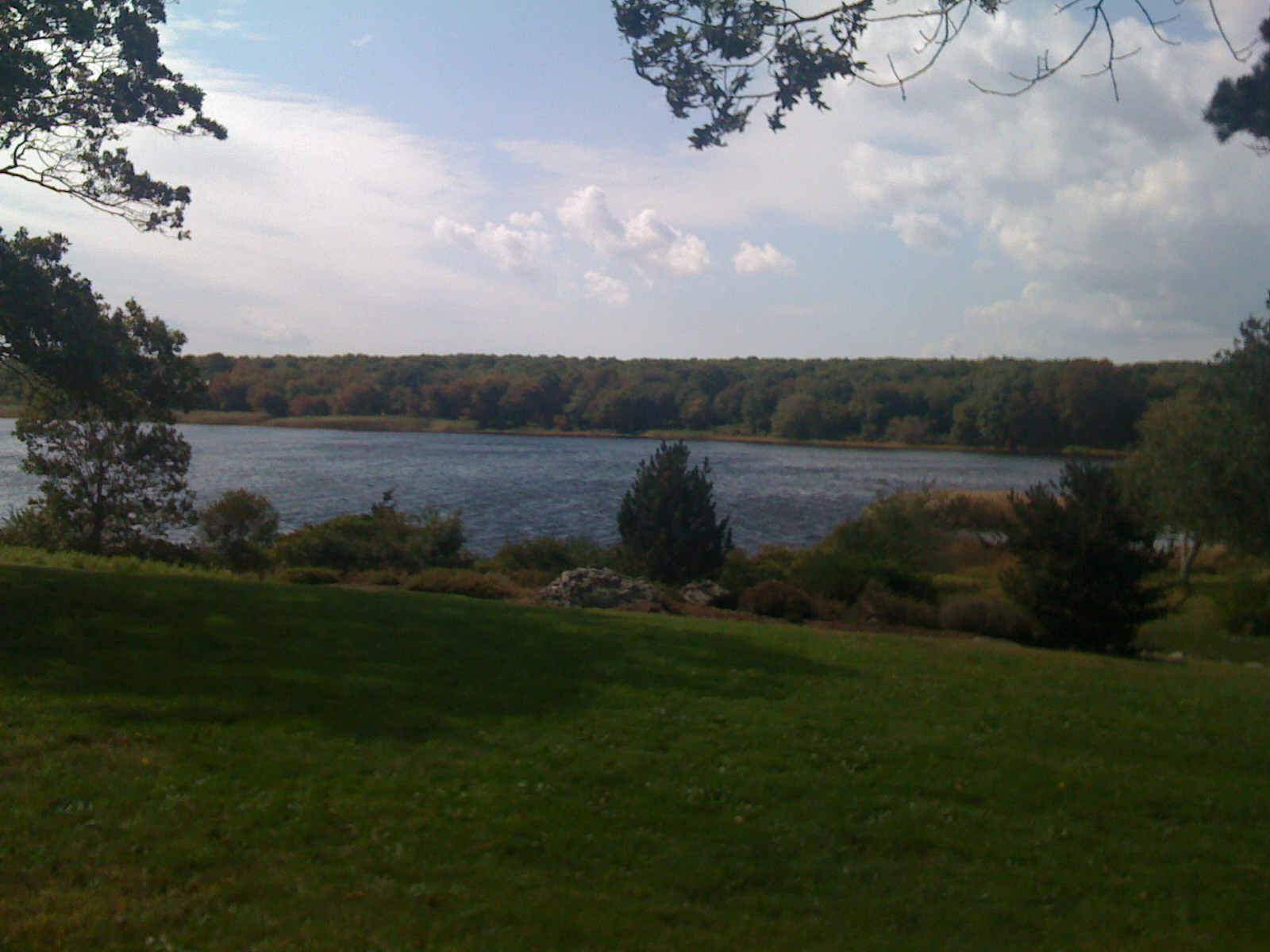
- The pond in 2009

- Location within Rhode Island Location within the United States
- Location: Little Compton, Rhode Island
- Coordinates: 41°30′23″N 71°07′48″W
- Lake type: Pond
- Primary inflows: Simmons Pond, Cold Brook
- Primary outflows: ephemeral outlet to the Rhode Island Sound
- Basin countries: United States
- Max. length: 1.5 mi (2.4 km)
- Max. width: 0.75 mi (1.21 km)
- Surface area: 390 acres (158 ha)
- Shore length^{1}: 4.3 mi (7 km)
- Surface elevation: 0 ft (0 m)
- Frozen: in winter
- Islands: 1
- ^{1} Shore length is not a well-defined measure.

Quicksand Pond is a pond in Little Compton, Rhode Island.

It is a major winter flounder spawning area, has Rare Species Habitat and Significant Natural Communities designation, and is part of a proposed natural greenway corridor. Quicksand Pond is also entirely surrounded by critical habitats, and there are a number of protected areas adjacent to Quicksand Pond. It is part of the Southeastern Coastal Watershed Basin.

It is part of one of the most scenic and undisturbed coastal areas in Rhode Island, and its protection is of high priority. Approximately half of the shorelines on Quicksand Pond are undeveloped, the remainder are developed as private residences.

== Birding ==
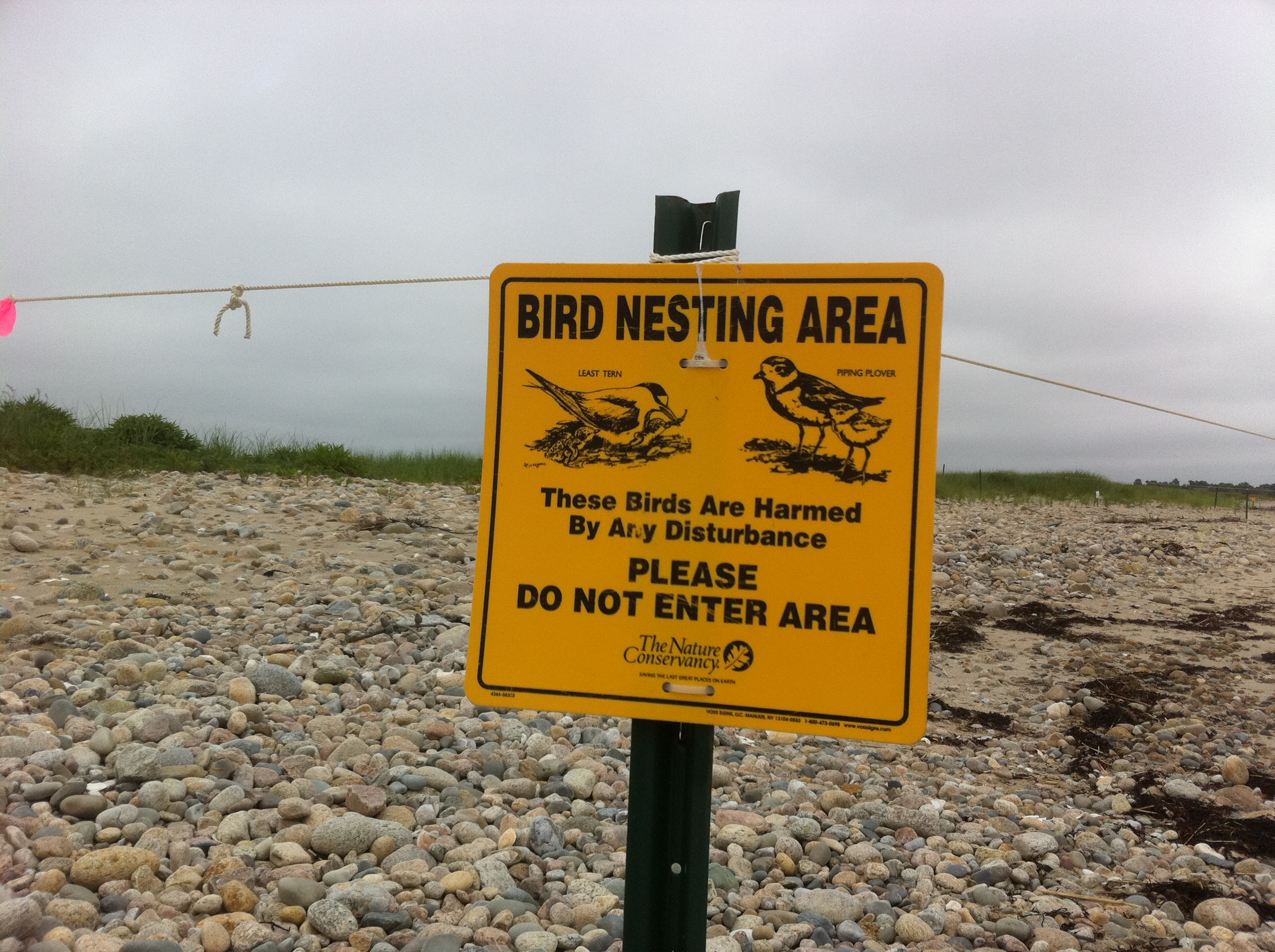
Piping plover and least tern nesting area sign at Quicksand Pond

Large, often exposed, mudflats are responsible for the large number of shorebirds that gather on Quicksand Pond during the spring and fall migrations. When the breachway that usually separates Quicksand Pond from Rhode Island Sound has recently opened, large tracts of fresh wet mud will attract most of the shorebird species in Rhode Island. Quicksand Pond was named number one of the Top Five Must-See Migrations for Rhode Island.

There are a number of birds that spend time at Quicksand Pond. On September 2, 1882, a Symphemia semipalmata was seen on Quicksand Pond. There are swans in Quicksand Pond. The Quicksand Pond area provides an excellent breeding habitat for the least tern, a rare shorebird, which arrives in May. Other shorebirds, including sanderlings, great and snowy egrets, dunlin, greater and lesser yellowlegs rest on the mudflats and the shoreline. A black rail is a rare sight at Quicksand Pond.

The barrier beach habitat of Quicksand Pond is a potential suitable nesting site for the American oystercatcher. saltmarsh sharp-tailed sparrows have also been seen. Waterfowl residents and migrants include Canada geese, canvasbacks, American black ducks and scaups. Quicksand Pond has been called one of the most significant migratory waterfowl concentration sites of New England. There are also historical records of sea-beach pigweed and sandplain gerardia.

=== Piping plover ===
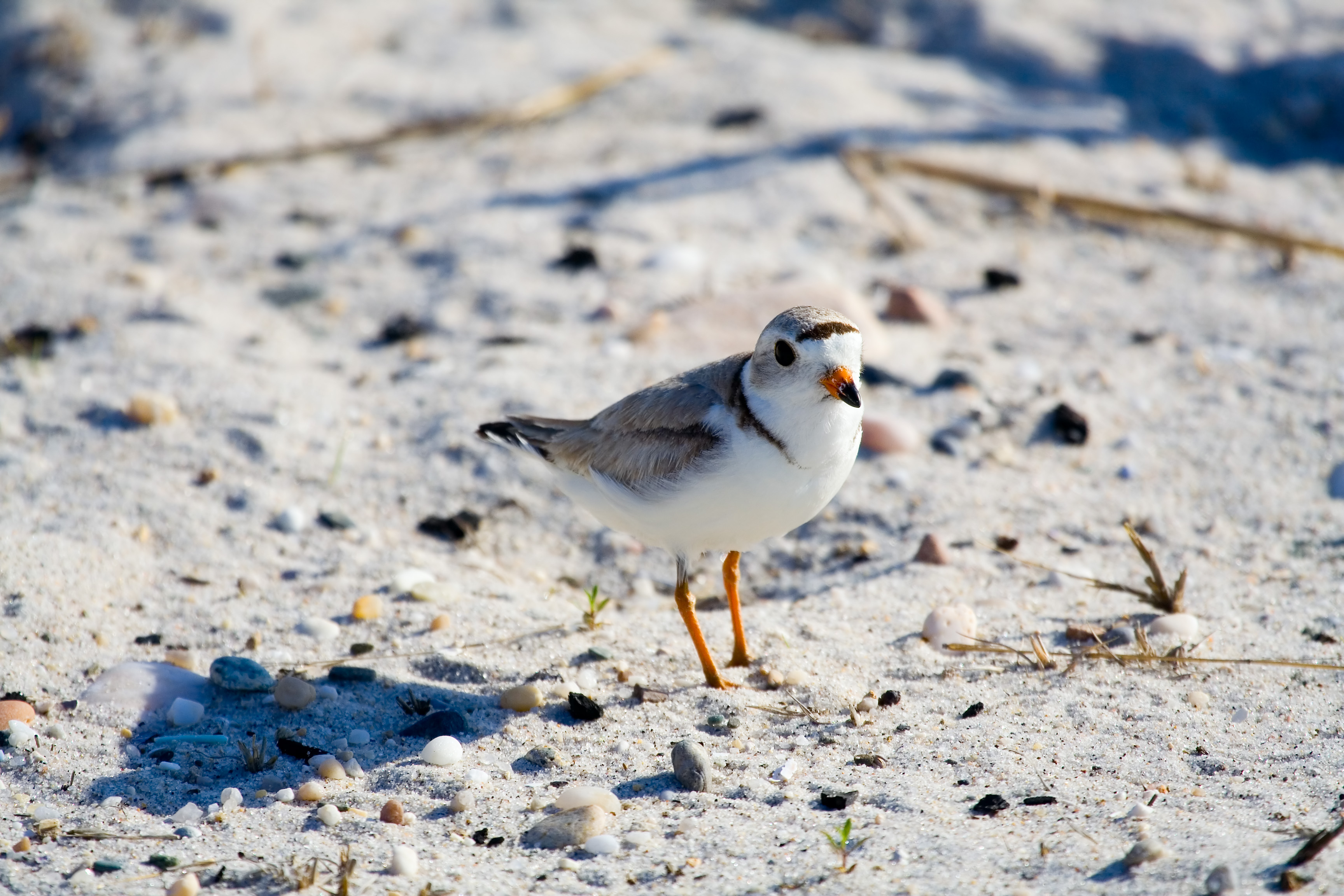
Piping plover

The piping plover, Rhode Island's rarest shorebird, comes to Quicksand Pond each April. The plovers arrive from the Gulf Coast and Bahamas.

Quicksand Pond is one of only five known breeding sites in Rhode Island for the piping plover. It contains one of the largest population of this species in Rhode Island, and has fledged an average of 11.3 young per year over the last 6 years.

== Goosewing Beach ==
Goosewing Beach is a 1.4 kilometres (0.87 mi) long cobbly barrier beach at the southern end of Quicksand Pond. Its dunes are dominated by beachgrass and seaside goldenrod.

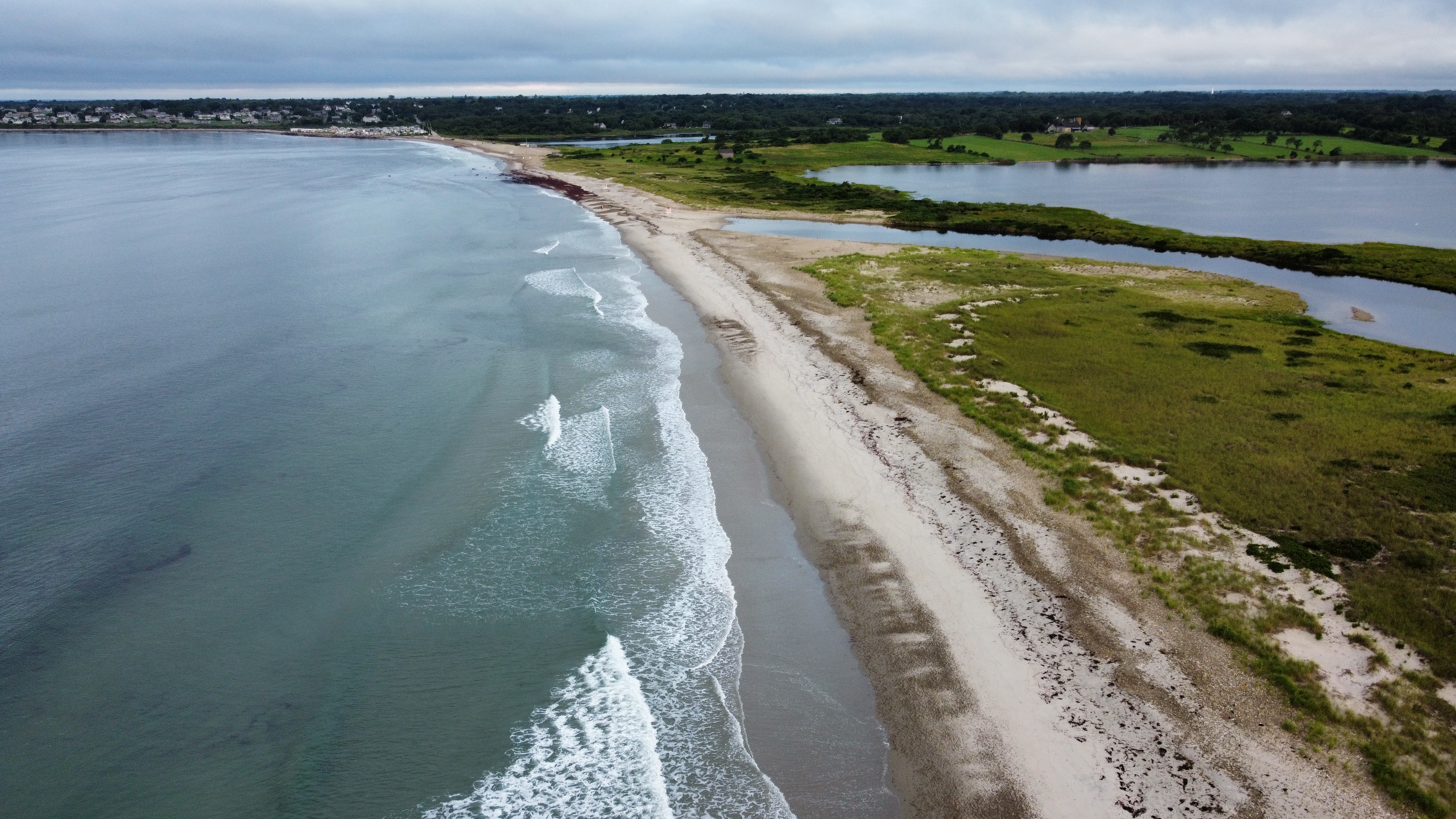
Goosewing Beach from a drone, with Quicksand Pond on the right and Tunipus Pond in the background

The Goosewing Beach Preserve, a 75 acres (300,000 m^{2}) preserve consisting of shore, ponds and dunes created 12,000 years ago by retreating glaciers, is considered one of Rhode Island's most scenic places. It is overseen by The Nature Conservancy.

Working with the Little Compton Agricultural Conservancy Trust and the Rhode Island Department of Environmental Management, the Goosewing Beach Preserve was purchased in 1989 by The Nature Conservancy and its partners. Conservancy staff have actively managed breeding populations of piping plover and least tern since then.

Goosewing Beach Preserve was listed as one world's best eco-friendly beaches by CNN, as a “Don’t Miss" by the Boston Globe, and as one of the 500 places to see before they disappear by Frommer's.

=== The Benjamin Family Environmental Center ===
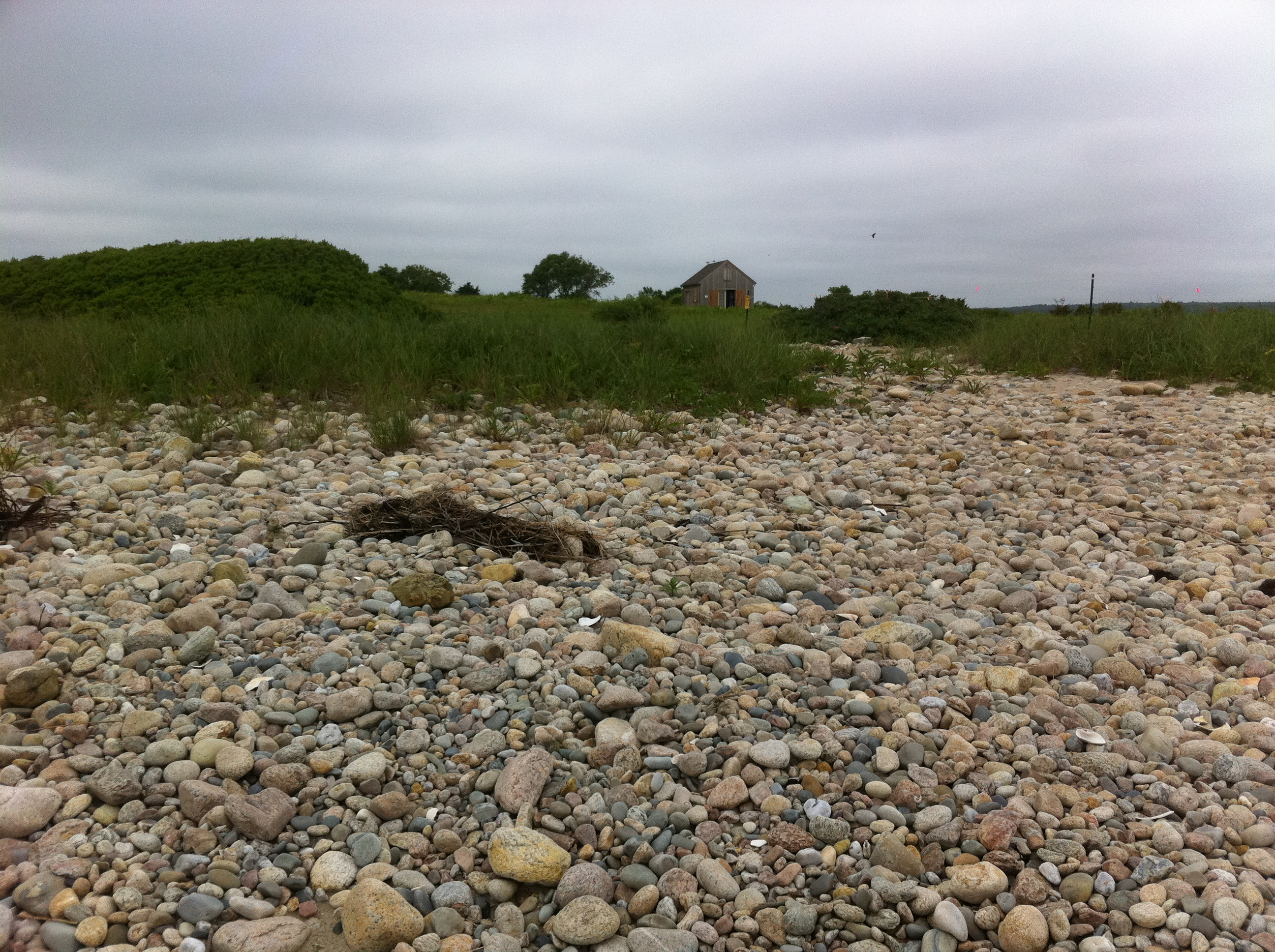
The Benjamin Family Environmental Center at the Goosewing Beach Preserve

The Nature Conservancy of Rhode Island opened The Benjamin Family Environmental Center on July 11, 2010. The Benjamin Family Environmental Center has programs and exhibits about the many types of habitats that make up the Quicksand Pond and Goosewing Beach Preserve areas.

The Nature Conservancy hires a Plover Warden and a Goosewing Beach Preserve Manager during nesting season (mid-April to early-September) to monitor and protect the species and to help educate beach-goers about the sensitive wildlife that inhabit the area.

A study at Goosewing beached provided evidence that mudflats are preferred brood-rearing habitat for piping plovers.

== The Gut ==
On the east side of the pond, there is a section called "The Gut".

== Fishing ==
Fish species include winter flounder, perch, American eel, soft-shelled clam, hard-shelled clam or quahog, and American oyster. Herring have been caught in Quicksand Pond.

=== Shellfishing ===
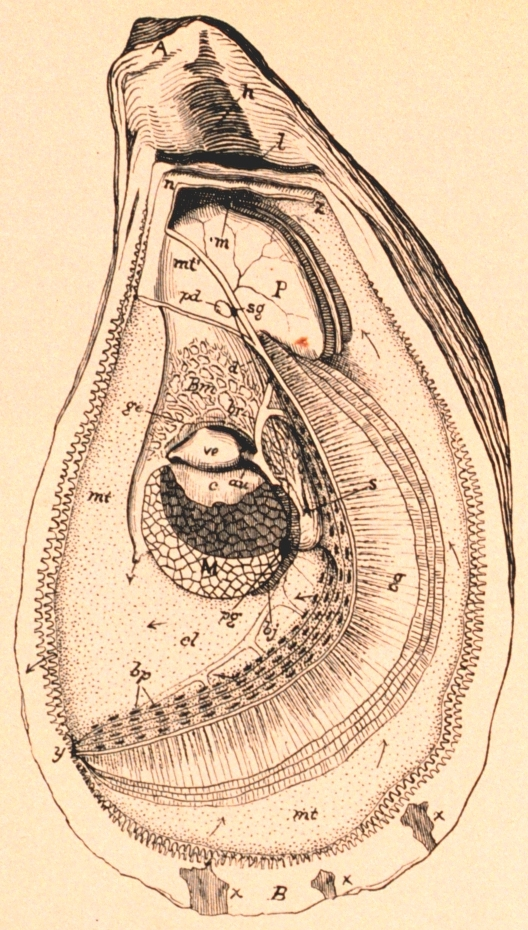
Drawing of oyster anatomy

In June 1853, the General Assembly of the state of Rhode Island and Providence Plantations, amended the "An Act for the preservation of Oysters and other Shell Fish within this State" as follows:

Quicksand Pond, in the town of Little Compton, shall be deemed and taken to be a free and common Oyster fishery in the waters of this State, and as such shall be subject to all the provisions of the act hereby amended.

In 1965, "[l]ittle change was noted in the supply of wild oysters from" Quicksand Pond. In 1968, the Shellfish survey of Quicksand Pond, Little Compton, R.I. was published.

==== Norovirus scare ====
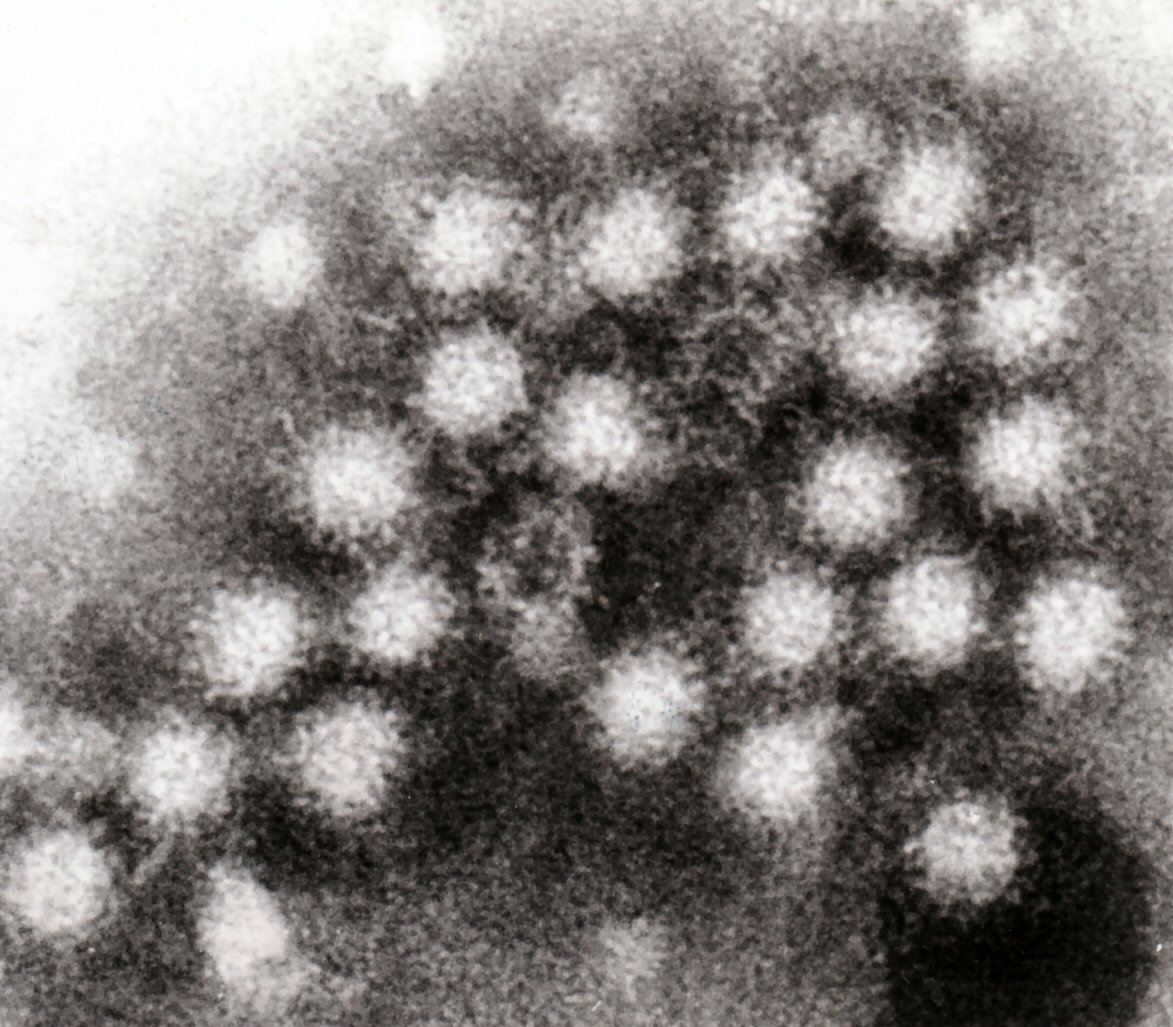
Transmission electron micrograph of Norovirus particles in faeces

On May 17, 2007, the FDA reported signs of norovirus in oysters distributed by Bridgeport Seafood in Tiverton, Rhode Island. The Rhode Island Department of Health investigation determined the oysters were collected by a single fisherman from Quicksand Pond. As the Health Department continued to investigate the Quicksand Pond case, it found no evidence to support the initial FDA alarm. There were no reports of anyone getting sick, and further testing failed to show any significant signs of bacteria from human waste in the pond. 50 bushels of oysters were embargoed and destroyed. Quicksand Pond is currently listed as Un-assessed – Shellfishing Prohibited.

== Artistic inspiration ==
Quicksand Pond has inspired at least two pieces of music: one is "Quicksand Pond" by Noreen Inglesi.
