= Lake Bel Air =

Lake in Providence County, Rhode Island, United States

- Location within Rhode Island Location within the United States
- Location: Providence County, Rhode Island
- Coordinates: 41.955376°N 71.582564°W
- Surface elevation: 94 metres (308 ft)

Lake Bel Air is a lake in the town of North Smithfield, in Providence County, Rhode Island.
