= Scantic River State Park =

State park in Hartford County, Connecticut

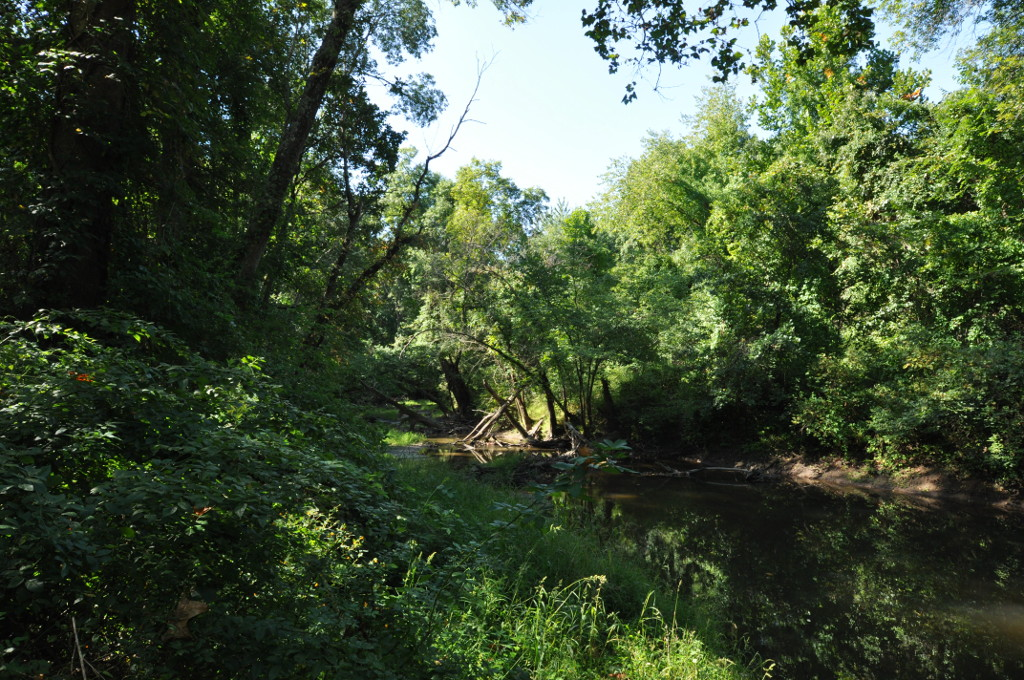
- Scantic River at the Melrose Road park access point in East Windsor

- Location within Connecticut Location within the United States
- Interactive map of Scantic River State Park
- Location: East Windsor, Enfield, and Somers, Connecticut, United States
- Coordinates: 41°59′01″N 72°31′37″W
- Area: 784 acres (317 ha)
- Elevation: 128 ft (39 m)
- Established: 1967
- Administrator: Connecticut Department of Energy and Environmental Protection
- Website: Official website
- Connecticut state parks

Scantic River State Park is a public recreation area consisting of several separated parcels totaling 784 acres (317 ha) along the Scantic River in the towns of Enfield, East Windsor, and Somers, Connecticut. The state park is suitable for hiking, fishing, and hunting and is managed by the Connecticut Department of Energy and Environmental Protection.

== History ==
The park was first planned in 1967 with the state legislature approving the plans the following year. A master plan was made public in 1989, after which the first state purchases of land for the park began. The state intended to purchase 2,215 acres (896 ha); as of 2024, 784 acres (317 ha) had been acquired.

== Hunting ==
Three parcels are open to hunting: the Powder Hollow area, a 167-acre (68 ha) parcel located in the Hazardville section of Enfield; an area of 180 acres (73 ha) located between Scitico Road and Route 190 around the Enfield/Somers townline; and the Harrington Lot, which covers 239 acres (97 ha) and is located primarily in East Windsor between Melrose Road and Route 140.
