= Butterfly Pond =

Lake in Rhode Island, United States

- Aldrich Brook
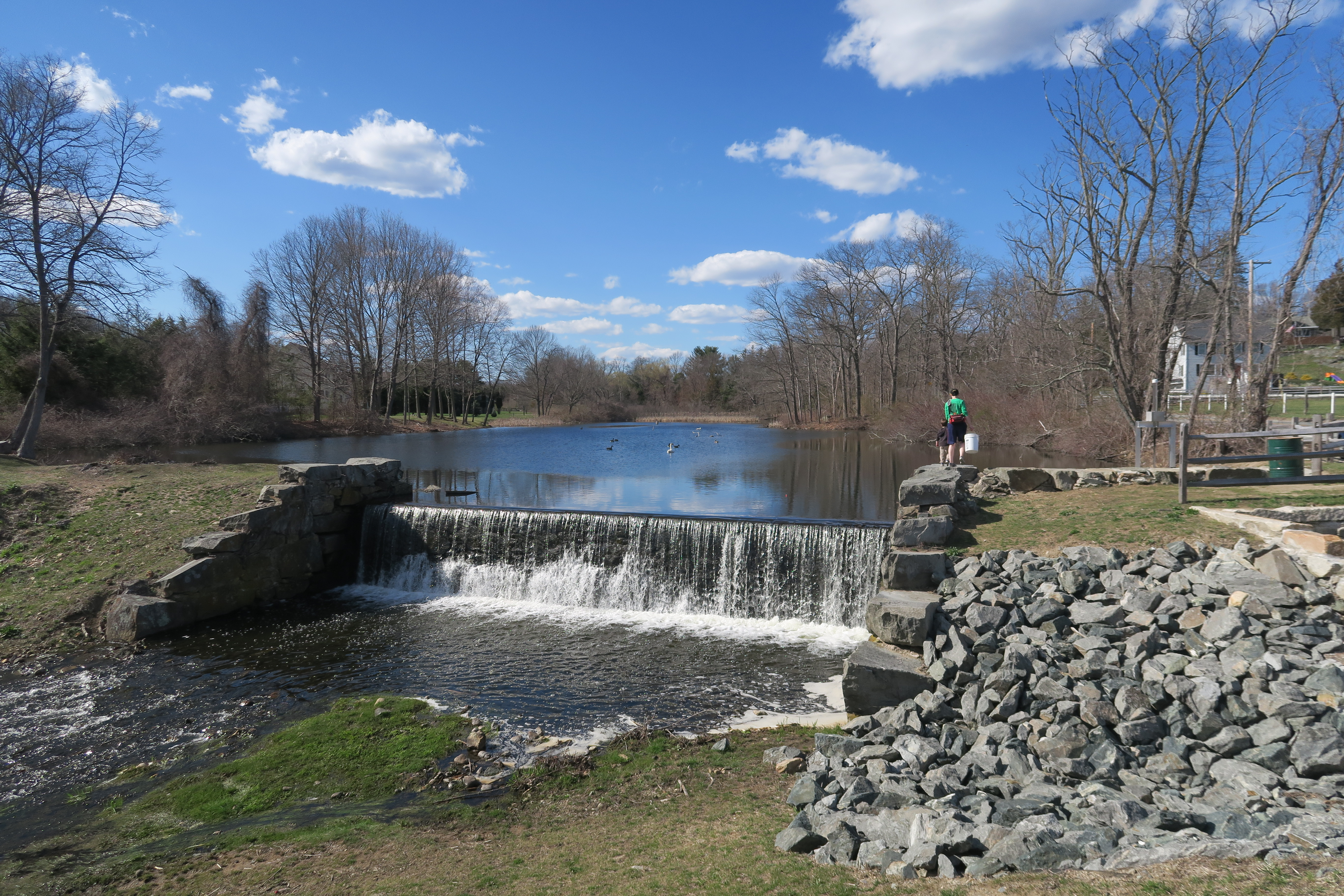
- Butterfly Pond

- Location within Rhode Island Location within the United States
- Location: Providence County, Rhode Island
- Coordinates: 41°54′26″N 71°25′56″W
- Type: pond
- Basin countries: United States
- Surface elevation: 112 ft (34 m)

Butterfly Pond, also known as Aldrich Brook, is a body of water in the town of Lincoln, in Providence County, Rhode Island.
