= Lake Mishnock =

Lake in Rhode Island, United States

- Location within Rhode Island Location within the United States
- Location: Kent County, Rhode Island, United States
- Coordinates: 41.653711°N 71.589785°W
- Basin countries: United States
- Surface elevation: 76 metres (249 ft)

Lake Mishnock is a residential recreational lake in West Greenwich, Kent County, Rhode Island. It lies immediately north of I-95.
