= Burlingame Reservoir =

- Location within Rhode Island
- Location: Glocester, Providence County, Rhode Island
- Coordinates: 41°54′51″N 71°44′32″W
- Type: reservoir
- Basin countries: United States
- Surface elevation: 594 ft (181 m)

Burlingame Reservoir is a body of water in Glocester, Providence County, Rhode Island, United States, and is part of the Durfee Hill Management Area.
