= Roosevelt Lake (Rhode Island) =

Lake in Providence, Rhode Island, United States

- Location within Rhode Island Location within the United States
- Location: Providence, Rhode Island, United States
- Coordinates: 41.784267°N 71.416168°W
- Basin countries: United States
- Surface elevation: 8 m (26 ft)

Roosevelt Lake is a lake in the southern part of the city of Providence, Rhode Island, United States.
