= Hazardville, Connecticut =

Census-designated place in Connecticut, United States

- Census-designated place
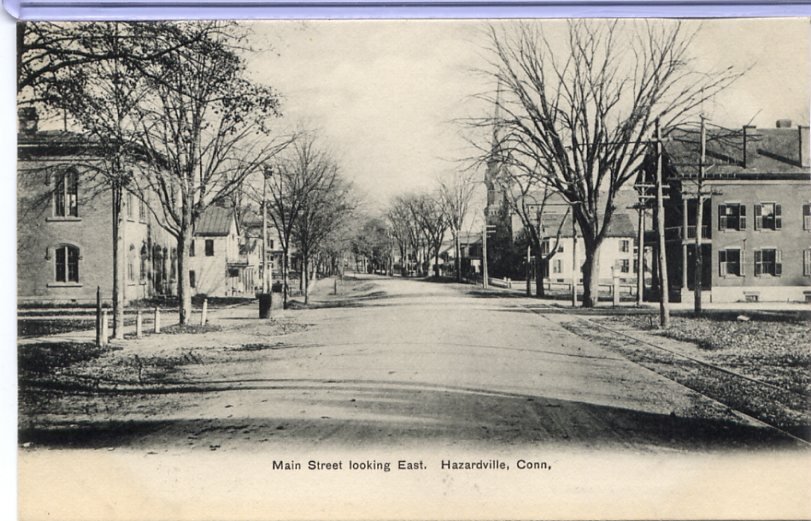
- Main Street in Hazardville, circa 1906

- Location within Connecticut Location within the United States
- Coordinates: 41°59′14″N 72°32′41″W
- Country: United States
- State: Connecticut
- County: Hartford
- Town: Enfield

Area
  - Total: 3.3 sq mi (8.5 km^{2})
  - Land: 3.3 sq mi (8.5 km^{2})
  - Water: 0 sq mi (0.0 km^{2})
- Elevation: 180 ft (55 m)

Population (2010)
  - Total: 4,599
  - Density: 1,400/sq mi (540/km^{2})
- Time zone: UTC-5 (Eastern)
  - Summer (DST): UTC-4 (Eastern)
- ZIP code: 06082
- Area code: 860
- FIPS code: 09-37770
- GNIS feature ID: 2377824

Hazardville is a section of the town of Enfield, Connecticut, United States, in Hartford County. It is a census-designated place (CDP) that had a population of 6,870 as of the 2020 census.

== History ==
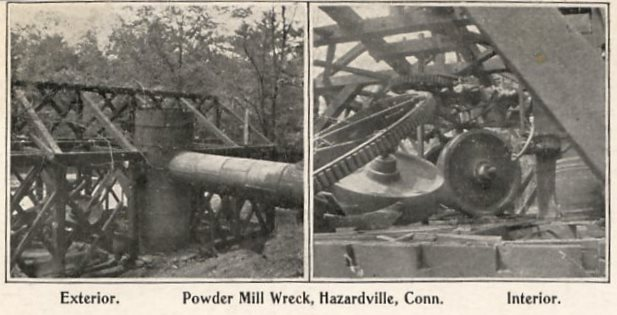
Powder mill wreckage, c. 1906

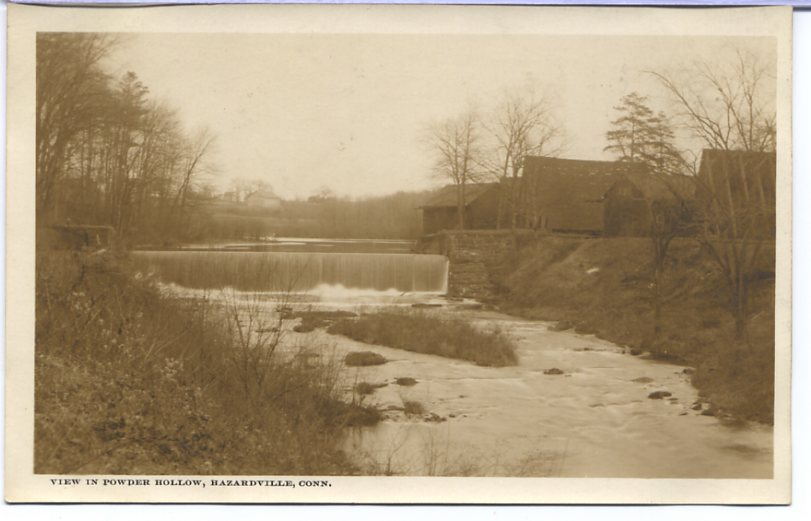
Powder Hollow, c. 1910

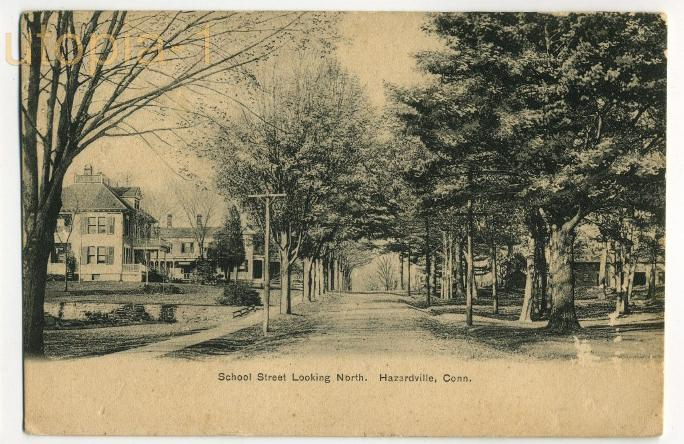
School Street, looking north, c. 1910

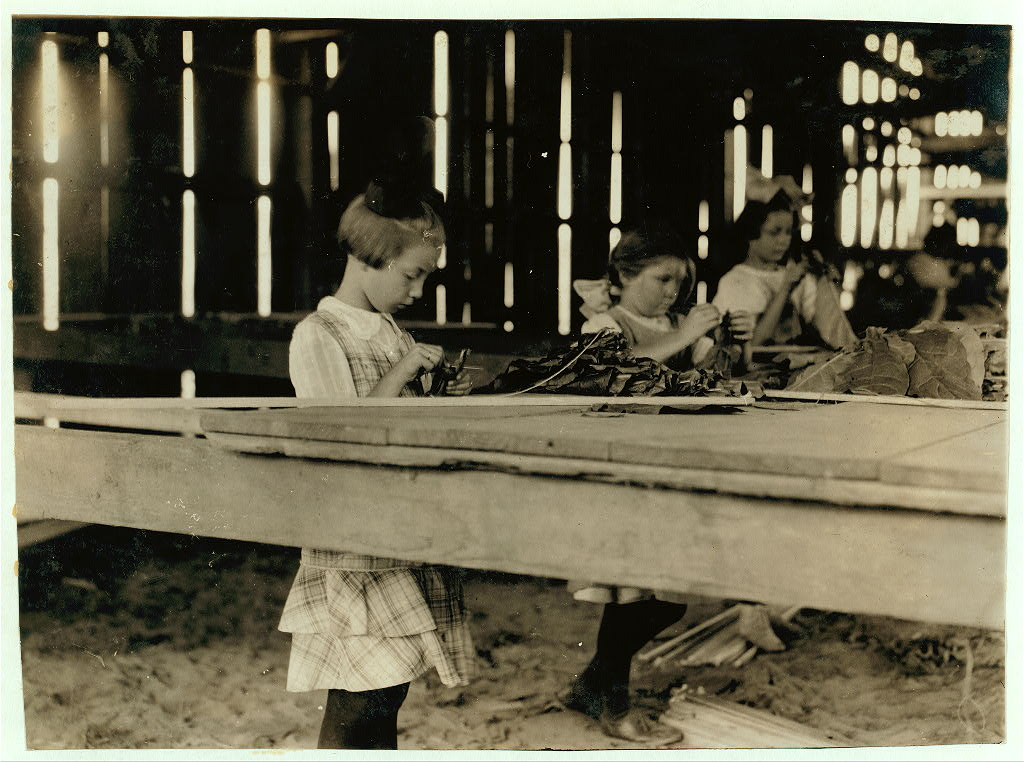
Child laborers in a tobacco shed at Hawthorn Farm in Hazardville, 1917. Photo by Lewis Hine.

Hazardville originated as an industrial village centered around the manufacture of gunpowder using water power from the Scantic River. The first small black powder mill was established in 1835 by Allen Loomis in an area then known as Powder Hollow. This became the Hazard Powder Company.

Hazardville takes its name from Colonel Augustus George Hazard.

=== Historic district ===
A 1,075-acre (4.35 km^{2}) area in and near Hazardville was listed on the National Register of Historic Places in 1980 as the Hazardville Historic District. The district is an irregularly shaped area that surrounds two interior areas that are not historical and are not included in the district. The district is focused on resources associated with the powder works, and includes industrial archaeological resources on either side of the Scantic River.

== Geography ==
The Hazardville CDP includes, in addition to the original Hazardville village, newer suburban developments east of the Central New England Railroad line to the Somers town line. According to the United States Census Bureau, the CDP has a total area of 3.3 square miles (8.5 km^{2}), all land.

One parcel of the Scantic River State Park is in the Powder Hollow portion of Hazardville.

== Demographics ==
=== 2020 census ===
As of the 2020 census, Hazardville had a population of 6,870. The median age was 43.0 years. 14.8% of residents were under the age of 18 and 18.5% of residents were 65 years of age or older. For every 100 females there were 120.3 males, and for every 100 females age 18 and over there were 121.8 males age 18 and over.

99.6% of residents lived in urban areas, while 0.4% lived in rural areas.

There were 2,632 households in Hazardville, of which 22.3% had children under the age of 18 living in them. Of all households, 43.0% were married-couple households, 18.7% were households with a male householder and no spouse or partner present, and 30.1% were households with a female householder and no spouse or partner present. About 32.6% of all households were made up of individuals and 15.9% had someone living alone who was 65 years of age or older.

There were 2,751 housing units, of which 4.3% were vacant. The homeowner vacancy rate was 1.2% and the rental vacancy rate was 5.0%.

Racial composition as of the 2020 census
Race	Number	Percent
White	5,443	79.2%
Black or African American	575	8.4%
American Indian and Alaska Native	8	0.1%
Asian	129	1.9%
Native Hawaiian and Other Pacific Islander	3	0.0%
Some other race	356	5.2%
Two or more races	356	5.2%
Hispanic or Latino (of any race)	593	8.6%

=== 2000 census ===
As of the census of 2000, there were 4,900 people, 1,832 households, and 1,337 families residing in the CDP. The population density was 575.0 people/km^{2} (1,489 people/mi^{2}). There were 1,876 housing units at an average density of 220.2 units/km^{2} (570 units/mi^{2}). The racial makeup of the CDP was 95.45% White, 1.41% African American, 0.22% Native American, 1.41% Asian, 0.02% Pacific Islander, 0.45% from other races, and 1.04% from two or more races. 1.41% of the population were Hispanic or Latino of any race.

There were 1,832 households, out of which 32.4% had children under the age of 18 living with them, 59.4% were married couples living together, 9.1% had a female householder with no husband present, and 27.0% were non-families. 22.3% of all households were made up of individuals, and 10.6% had someone living alone who was 65 years of age or older. The average household size was 2.61 and the average family size was 3.07.

In the CDP, the population was spread out, with 24.3% under the age of 18, 5.4% from 18 to 24, 30.4% from 25 to 44, 21.8% from 45 to 64, and 18.1% who were 65 years of age or older. The median age was 40 years. For every 100 females, there were 94.5 males. For every 100 females age 18 and over, there were 93.2 males.

The median income for a household in the CDP was $54,596, and the median income for a family was $61,183. Males had a median income of $40,606 versus $28,806 for females. The per capita income for the CDP was $22,293. 3.7% of the population and 2.1% of families were below the poverty line. 2.1% of those under the age of 18 and 2.1% of those 65 and older were living below the poverty line.
