= Miscoe Lake =

- Location within Massachusetts Location within the United States
- Location: Providence County, Rhode Island / Norfolk County, Massachusetts, United States
- Coordinates: 42°00′28″N 71°25′03″W
- Type: reservoir
- Basin countries: United States
- Max. length: 0.8 mi (1.3 km)
- Surface area: 49 acres (20 ha)
- Water volume: 226 acre⋅ft (279,000 m^{3}) Normal
- Surface elevation: 71 m (233 ft)

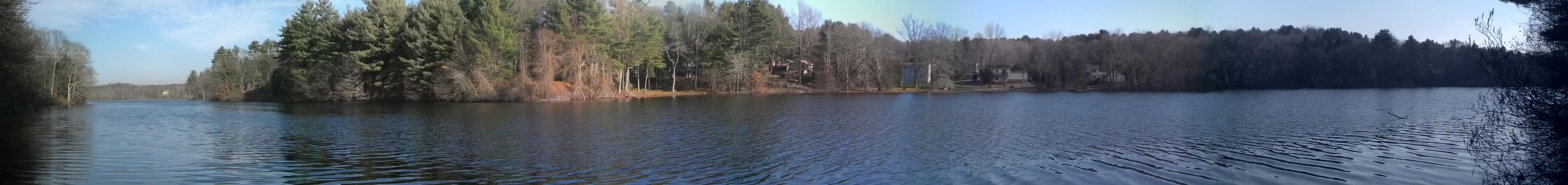
Panoramic image of Miscoe Lake in 2012

Miscoe Lake is a reservoir in Cumberland, Providence County, Rhode Island. It is about 0.8 miles (1.3 km) long and the northern tip of the lake lies in Wrentham, Norfolk County, Massachusetts. At normal levels it has a surface area of 49 acres (20 ha). It has also been known as Grants Mills Pond and Miso Meadow Pond.

Located at the southern part of the lake is historical Grant's Mill. It resides on Miscoe Lake Dam, also known as Grants Mill Pond Dam, which was built in 1937. The dam's height is 14 feet (4.3 m) with a length of 75 feet (23 m), and maximum discharge is 70 cubic feet (2.0 m^{3}) per second. Its capacity is 244 acre-feet (301,000 m^{3}) with normal storage of 226 acre-feet (279,000 m^{3}). The dam drains an area of 3 square miles (7.8 km^{2}).

== Wildlife ==
The lake is home to many wildlife species, including beavers, swans, herons, cormorants, turtles, and is a temporary habitat for Canada geese. Fish species include Largemouth bass, Chain pickerel, and Bluegill.
