= Diamond Hill Reservoir =

- Pawtucket Upper Reservoir
- Location within Rhode Island
- Location: Cumberland, Providence County, Rhode Island
- Coordinates: 41°59′23″N 71°23′55″W
- Type: Reservoir
- Basin countries: United States
- Built: 1971
- Surface area: 400 acres (160 ha)
- Water volume: 683,000,000 cu ft (19,340,000 m^{3})
- Surface elevation: 200 ft (60 m)

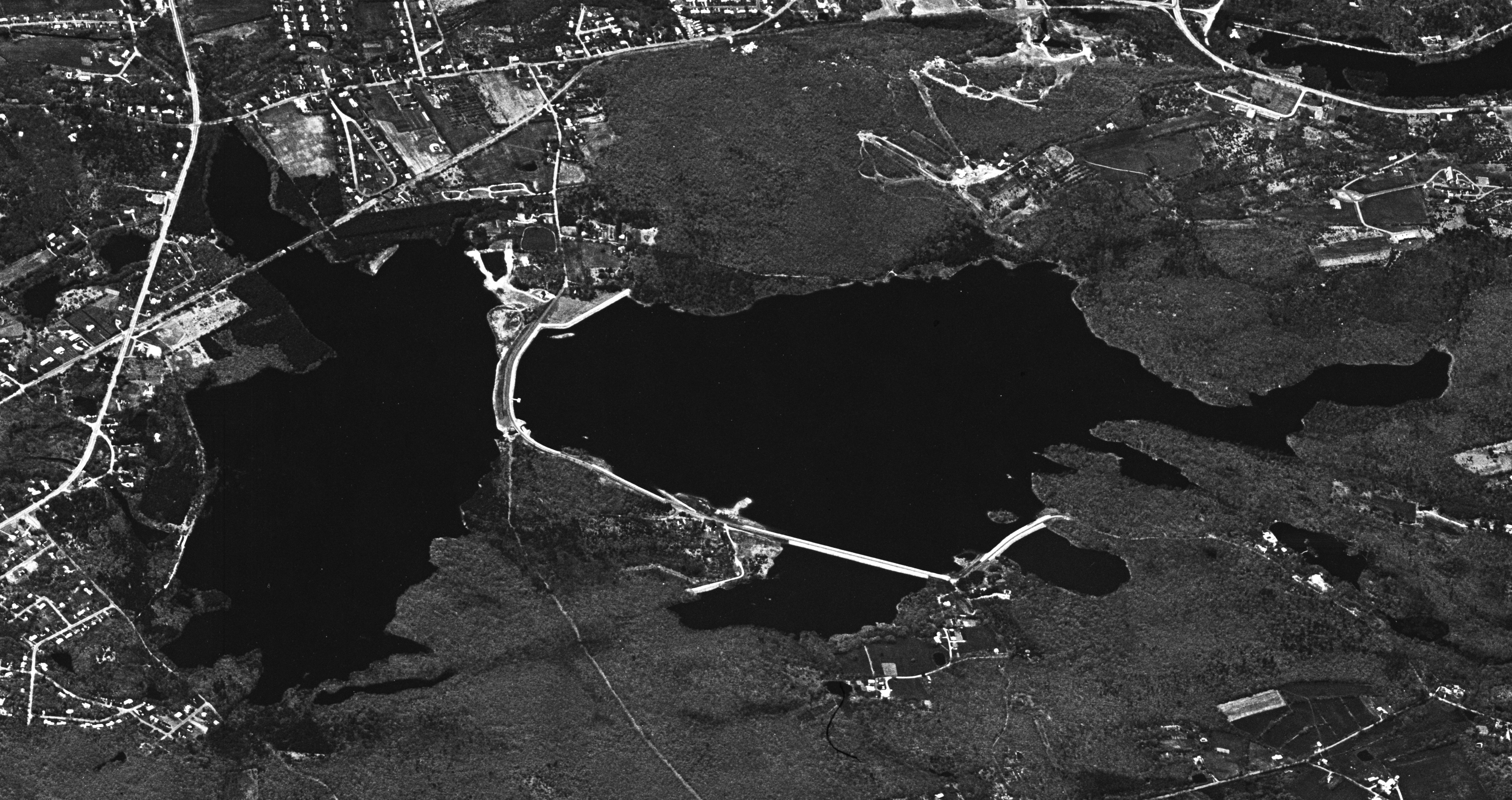
Oblique view of Arnold Mills Reservoir (left) and Diamond Hill Reservoir (right) in 1974

Diamond Hill Reservoir (also known as the Pawtucket Upper Reservoir) is a reservoir in Cumberland, Providence County, Rhode Island near Diamond Hill.

The earthen Diamond Hill Reservoir Dam was constructed in 1971 with a height of 80 feet (24 m), and a length of 2,000 feet (610 m) at its crest. It impounds the Abbott Run waterway for municipal drinking water. Both dam and reservoir are owned and operated by the city of Pawtucket's Water Supply Board.

The reservoir it creates has a normal surface area of 390 acres (160 ha), a maximum capacity of 15,680 acre-feet (19.34 million cubic metres), and a normal storage of 11,000 acre⋅ft (14 million m^{3}). Immediately adjacent to the south is the Arnold Mills Reservoir.
