= Trustom Pond =

Closed lagoon in South Kingstown, Rhode Island

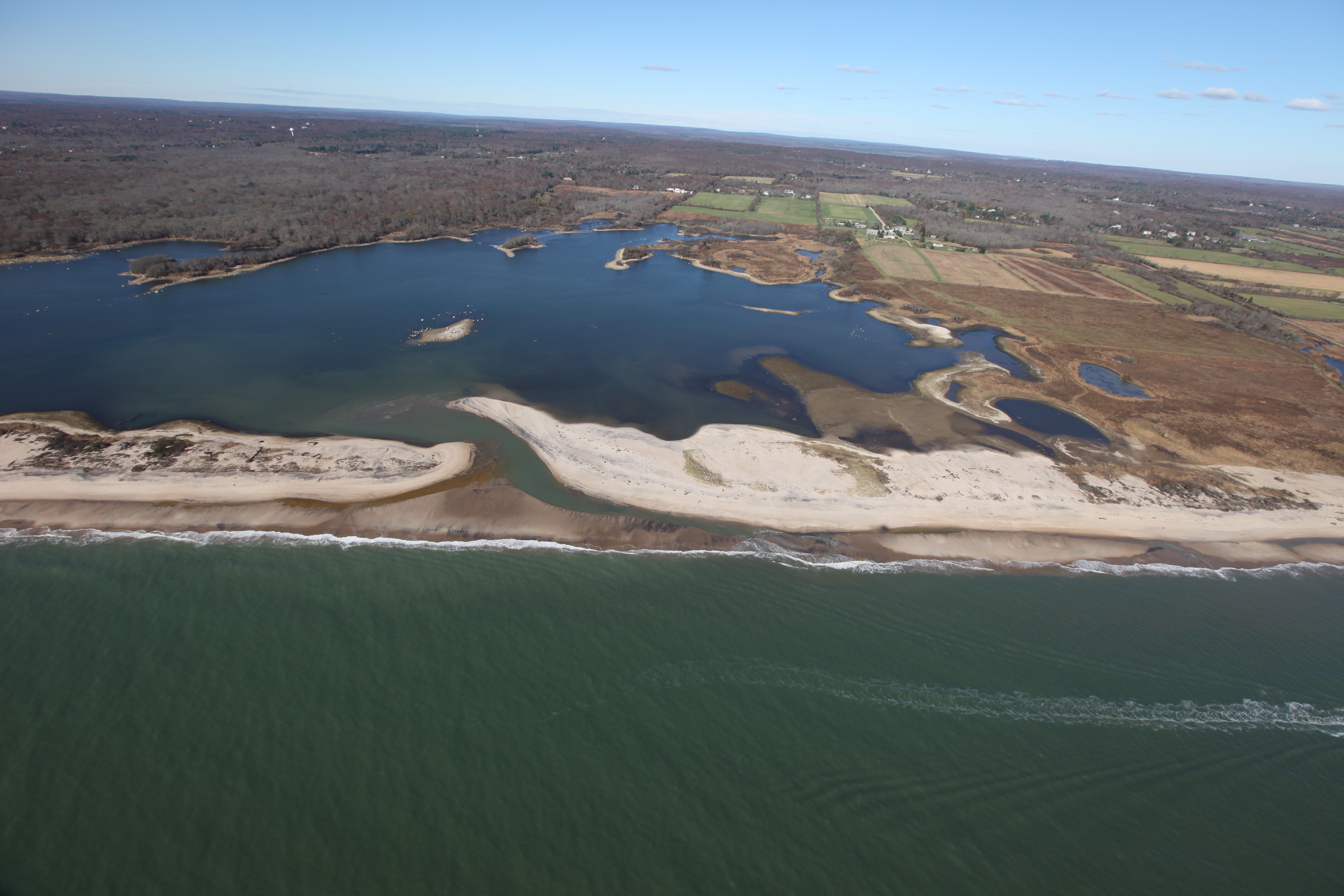
- Aerial view of the pond

- Location within Rhode Island
- Location: South Kingstown Washington County, Rhode Island
- Coordinates: 41°22′17″N 71°34′57″W
- Type: saline
- Primary inflows: precipitation, groundwater
- Catchment area: 794 acres (321 ha)
- Basin countries: United States
- Surface area: 180 acres (73 ha)
- Average depth: 1.3 ft (0.40 m)
- Surface elevation: 0 ft (0 m)
- Website: www.fws.gov/refuge/trustom_pond/

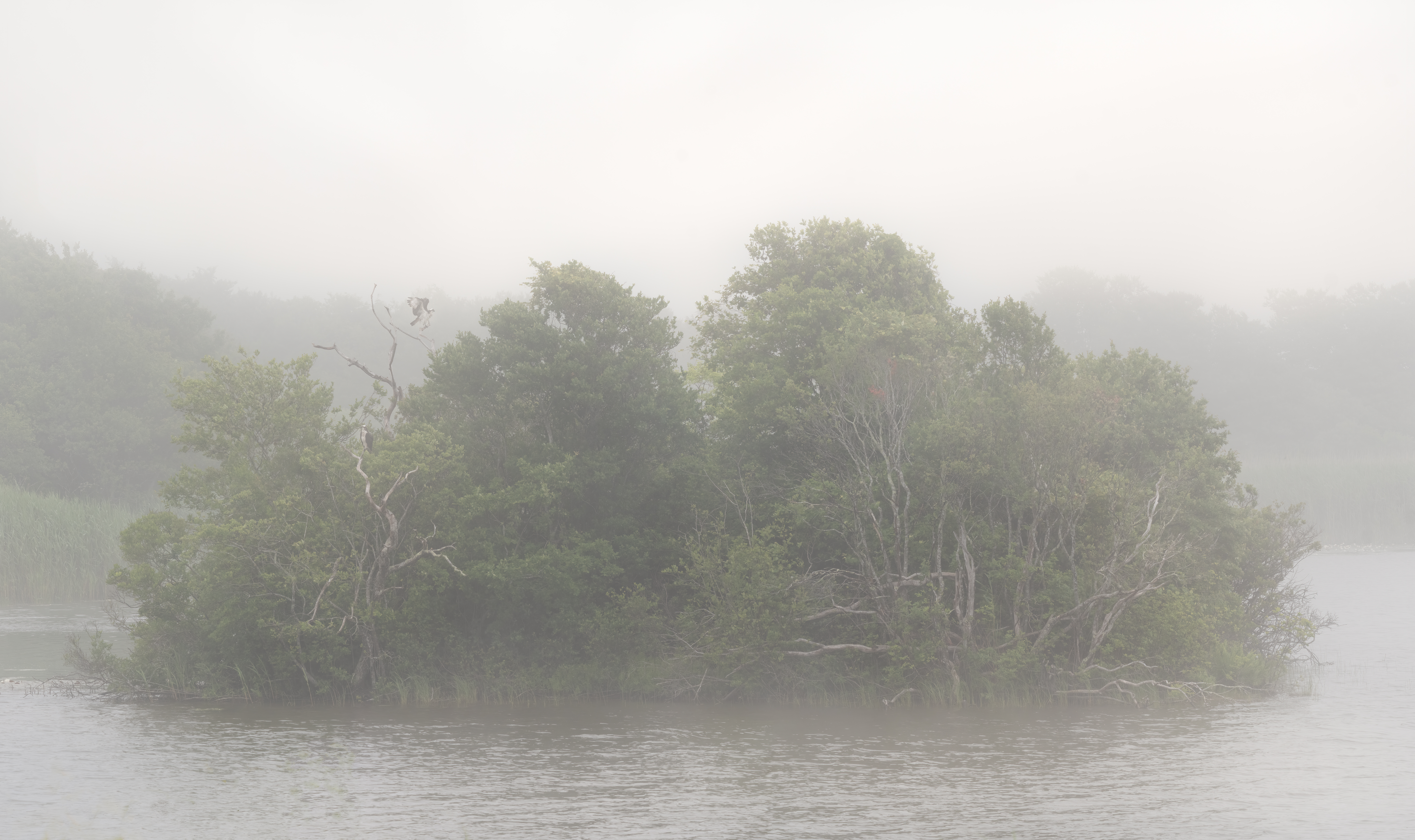
Island in Trustom Pond with ospreys perched on a foggy morning

Trustom Pond is a closed lagoon in South Kingstown, Washington County, Rhode Island, United States. It is one of nine coastal lagoons (referred to as "salt ponds" by locals) in southern Rhode Island. It has a surface area of 800 acres (320 ha), and is the only undeveloped salt pond in the state. The pond averages 1.3 feet (0.40 m) deep, and has a salinity level of 5 parts per thousand. It is non-tidal, except when breached by storms. The water directly receives about 219,844,022 US gallons (832,200 m^{3}) of precipitation per year, with an estimated 796,215 US gallons (3,014 m^{3}) in daily groundwater flow. No streams flow into the pond, though a nearby stream "captures water that otherwise would have flowed to Trustom Pond".

Trustom Pond National Wildlife Refuge is a National Wildlife Refuge, inhabited by an estimated 300 species of birds, as well as some 40 species of mammals and 20 species of reptiles and amphibians. As such, it is a popular bird-watching destination. The piping plover inhabits the site. In 1974, 365 acres (148 ha) of land were donated to the U.S. Fish and Wildlife Service; subsequent donations and purchases raised the protected area to 787 acres (318 ha). In 2010, the wildlife refuge received approximately 70,000 visitors. Trustom Pond NWR includes 3 miles (4.8 km) of nature trails. Habitat areas within Trustom Pond NWR include fields, shrubland, woodland, freshwater pond, saltwater ponds, beaches, and sand dunes. Wildlife managers create breachways to the Block Island Sound, lowering water levels and creating mudflats which become feeding areas for waders.

== See also ==
- List of lakes in Rhode Island
- Geography of Rhode Island
