= Point Judith Pond =

Pond in Rhode Island, U.S.

- Location within Rhode Island
- Location: Washington County, Rhode Island, United States
- Coordinates: 41°23′59″N 71°30′23″W
- Basin countries: United States
- Max. length: 4 mi (6.4 km)
- Max. width: 1 mi (1.6 km)

Point Judith Pond is a shallow, four-mile (6 km)-long salt body of water lying behind the barrier beaches and sand dunes that form Point Judith Harbor, which lies immediately west of Point Judith in Narragansett, Rhode Island at the southwestern tip of Narragansett Bay. Located about 14 miles (23 km) southwest of Newport Harbor, Point Judith Pond forms a partial border between the communities of Narragansett and South Kingstown, and is connected to Point Judith Harbor by a narrow waterway that cuts through the beaches and sandy shoreline. This waterway is used by a large fishing fleet and local and transient recreational craft. The harbor handles a large amount of passenger traffic, primarily during the summer. Year-round ferry service is available between Point Judith and Block Island.

Original work in Point Judith Harbor dates back to 1905. Work in the present project, completed in 1950 (except where noted), consists of:

- A 6,970-foot (2,120 m)-long main stone breakwater in Point Judith Harbor, situated about 0.5-mile (0.80 km) from shore. This breakwater, constructed roughly in a "V" shape, and the two others mentioned below were built in 1914.
- A 2,240-foot (680 m)-long stone breakwater extending southwesterly from Point Judith. Between the breakwaters there is a gap of about 1,200 feet (370 m), which allows boating craft to enter the harbor.
- A 3,640-foot (1,110 m)-long stone breakwater extending southerly from the entrance to Point Judith Pond. Between this breakwater and the main breakwater there is a gap of about 1,500 feet (460 m).
- A 15-foot (4.6 m)-deep channel, 150 feet (46 m) wide, that runs along the east side of the west breakwater and extends past the entrance to Point Judith Pond and the state-built jetties at the Port of Galilee. The channel ends on the west side of the pond at a point 100 feet (30 m) north of the State Pier in Jerusalem.
- A 15-foot (4.6 m)-deep channel, 200 feet (61 m) wide, that branches off from the aforementioned channel at a point past the state built jetties and extends up the east side of Point Judith Pond. When originally constructed in 1950, the channel ended about 100 feet (30 m) north of the State Pier in Galilee. In 1977, the channel was lengthened by 1,400 feet (430 m) and widened to dimensions varying between 150–640 feet. This most recent work was completed as a small project under Section 107 of the Continuing Authorities Program.
- A 10-foot (3.0 m)-deep anchorage, 5 acres (20,000 m^{2}) in area, located on the pond's westerly side, immediately inside the pond's entrance.
- A 4.5-mile (7.2 km)-long channel, six feet deep and 100 feet (30 m) wide, starting at a point 100 feet (30 m) north of the State Pier in Jerusalem and running generally along the west side of the pond, ending in the Wakefield village of South Kingstown.
- A six-foot-deep anchorage, 5 acres (20,000 m^{2}) in area, at the end of the 4.5-mile (7.2 km)-long channel in Wakefield. The removal of two shoals to a depth of 18 feet (5.5 m). One shoal was removed from the 10-foot (3.0 m)-deep anchorage area, and the second from the east side of the Point Judith Pond entrance. This work was completed in 1921.
- Various works to help trap and retain sand at the entrance to the pond.
