= Scantic River =

River in Massachusetts and Connecticut, United States

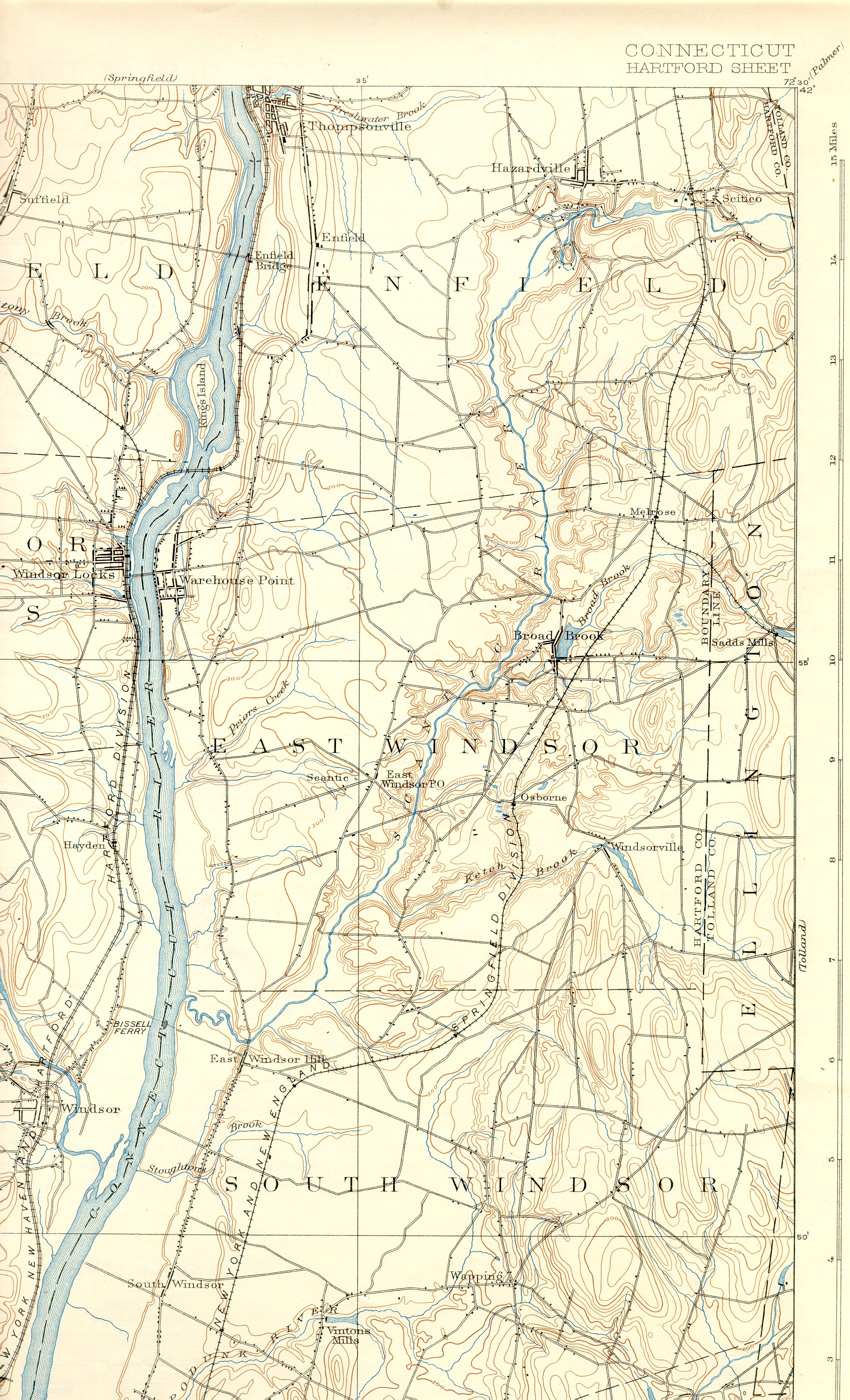
The lower Scantic River and environs, depicted on an 1892 topographic map.

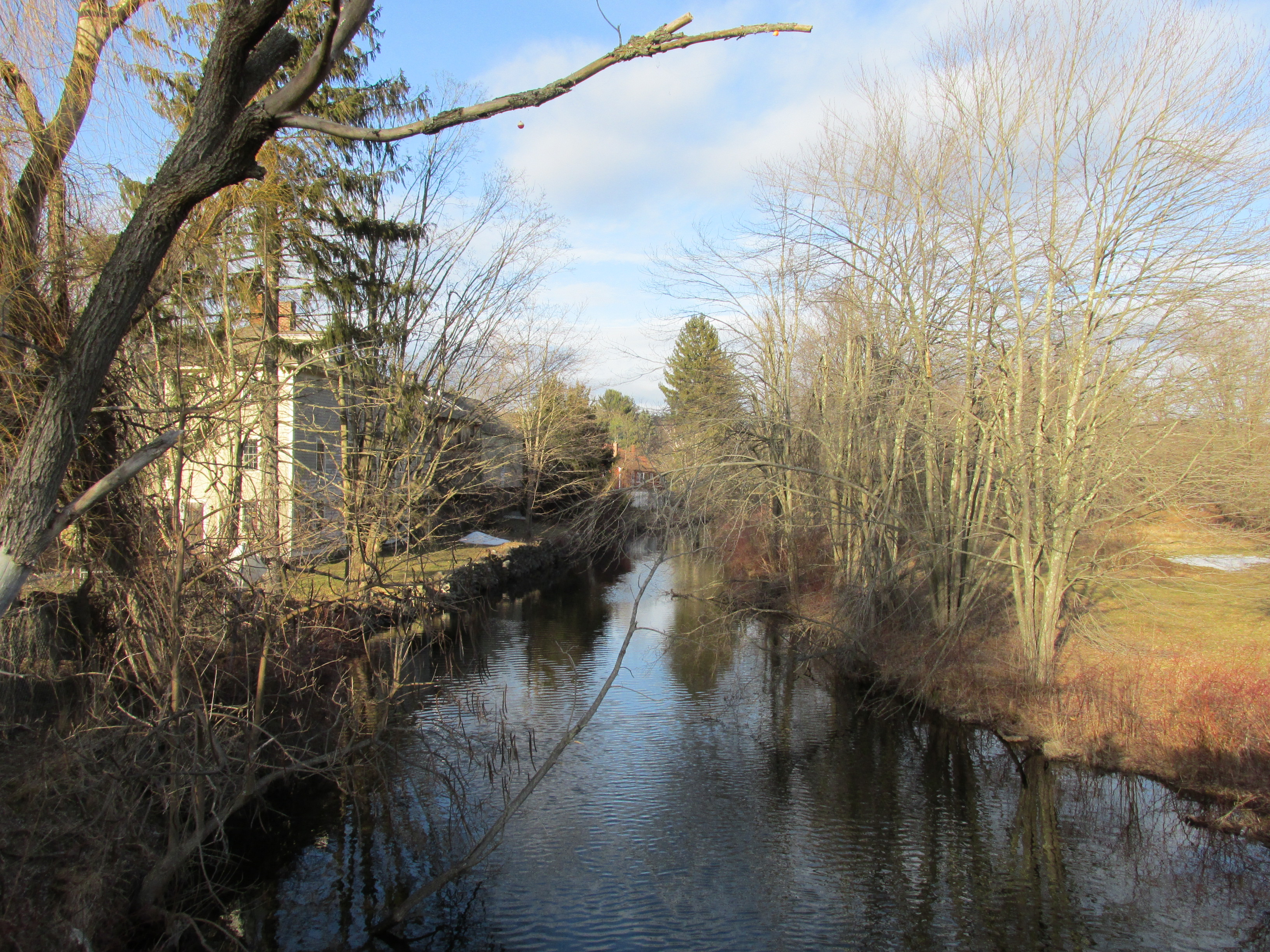
In Hampden, Massachusetts

The Scantic River (pronounced SKAN-tik) is a river that flows through the states of Massachusetts and Connecticut. It is a tributary to the Connecticut River.

The Scantic River's tributaries rise in the towns of Hampden, Wilbraham, East Longmeadow and Monson in Massachusetts, and in Stafford and Somers, Connecticut, forming the river in the town of Hampden, Massachusetts southeast of Springfield. The Scantic flows southwest for 40.6 miles (65.3 km) through the towns and communities of Hampden, Massachusetts; Somers, Somersville, Scitico, Hazardville, Enfield, East Windsor, Broad Brook, Scantic, South Windsor, and East Windsor Hill, Connecticut, until joining the Connecticut River (41.8678°N 72.6165°W) near the East Windsor Hill community, part of South Windsor.

There are two areas named after the river. One is a small community, part of East Windsor. The other is in the southeast section of Hampden, near the corner of Scantic Road and Rock-A-Dundee Road.

Among things named after the river are several roads, the Scantic River Valley YMCA, the Scantic River Artists, the Scantic River Watershed Assn., and many others.

== See also ==
- List of rivers of Connecticut
