= Pittsburgh (disambiguation) =

Pittsburgh is the second largest city in Pennsylvania, U.S.

Pittsburgh may also refer to:

== Places ==
=== Pennsylvania ===
- East Pittsburgh, Pennsylvania, a borough in Allegheny County, Pennsylvania
- Pittsburgh Coalfield
- Pittsburgh Field Club
- Pittsburgh International Airport
- Pittsburgh Landmarks (disambiguation)
- Pittsburgh metropolitan area, for the region encompassing the city
- University of Pittsburgh

=== Other places ===
- Birmingham, Alabama, nicknamed the "Pittsburgh of the South"
- Pittsburgh, Atlanta, Georgia, US
- Pittsburgh, Kingston, Ontario, Canada
- Pittsburgh Channel, Ontario, Canada
- Pittsburgh Historic District (disambiguation)

== Sports ==
- Pittsburgh Americans, an American Football League (1936–1937)
- Pittsburgh Associates
- Pittsburgh Condors, an American Basketball Association team from 1967–1972
- Pittsburgh drug trials, the first drug crisis in Major League Baseball
- Pittsburgh Hardhats (disambiguation)
- Pittsburgh Hornets, an American minor-league hockey team from 1936–1967
- Pittsburgh Keystones (disambiguation)
- Pittsburgh Marathon
- Pittsburgh Maulers (disambiguation)
- Pittsburgh Panthers, the athletic program of the University of Pittsburgh
- Pittsburgh Penguins, a National Hockey League team
- Pittsburgh Phantoms (disambiguation)
- Pittsburgh Pirates, a Major League Baseball team
- Pittsburgh Pirates (disambiguation)
- Pittsburgh Power, an Arena Football League
- Pittsburgh Stars, championship football team in the original NFL (1900–02)
- Pittsburgh Steelers, National Football League
- Pittsburgh Vintage Grand Prix, a motor sports car race
- Pittsburgh Riverhounds, USL Championship soccer team

== Arts and entertainment ==
- Pittsburgh (1942 film), with Marlene Dietrich, Randolph Scott, and John Wayne
- Pittsburgh (2006 film), a film starring Jeff Goldblum
- "Pittsburgh" (Weeds), an episode of the TV series Weeds
- "Pittsburgh, Pennsylvania" (song), a 1952 popular song written by Bob Merrill
- "Pittsburgh Town" or "Pittsburgh", a 1941 folk song written by Woody Guthrie and recorded by Pete Seeger
- Pittsburgh (album), by Ahmad Jamal
- Pittsburgh Landscape, a 1954 abstract sculpture by David Smith

== Naval vessels ==
- USS Pittsburgh (1861), an ironclad gunboat
- USS Pittsburgh (CA-4), originally USS Pennsylvania (ACR-4), an armored cruiser
- USS Pittsburgh (CA-72), a Baltimore-class heavy cruiser
- USS Pittsburgh (SSN-720), a Los Angeles-class submarine

== People ==
- Pittsburgh crime family
- Pittsburgh Slim, rap artist
- "Pittsburgh Phil" (Harry Strauss; 1909–1941), mobster and member of Murder Inc.
- "Pittsburgh Phil" (George E. Smith; 1862–1905), gambler

== Transportation ==
- Pittsburgh Line, a line of the Norfolk Southern Railway
- Pittsburgh Pike, an early toll road
- Pittsburgh Railways
- Pittsburgh Subdivision, a railroad line

== Other uses ==
- Pittsburgh (Hasidic dynasty), founded in Pittsburgh
- 2009 G20 Pittsburgh summit, a meeting of the G20 countries in Pittsburgh, Pennsylvania
- Miss Pittsburgh, an early airmail plane
- Pittsburgh Tools, a line of tools made and sold by Harbor Freight Tools

== See also ==
- Pittsburgh shooting (disambiguation)
- Pittsburgh station (disambiguation)
- Diocese of Pittsburgh (disambiguation)
- Metropolis of Pittsburgh (disambiguation)
- 484 Pittsburghia, an asteroid
- Pitsburg, Ohio
- Pitt (disambiguation)
- Pittsburg (disambiguation)
- West Pittsburg (disambiguation)
