= Plattsburgh (disambiguation) =

Plattsburgh is a city in the U.S. state of New York.

Plattsburgh may also refer to:

- Plattsburgh (town), New York, adjacent to the city
- Plattsburgh, Ohio, an unincorporated community in the U.S.
- "Plattsburgh camps" (1915–1916), privately organized camps for military training
- Battle of Plattsburgh (1814), a battle during the War of 1812
- State University of New York at Plattsburgh, a public university

== See also ==
- Plattsburg (disambiguation)
- Pittsburgh (disambiguation)
- Pittsburg (disambiguation)
