= Ohio State Route 370 =

State highway in Greene County, Ohio, US

State Route 370

Route information
- Maintained by ODOT
- Length: 1.21 mi (1.95 km)
- Existed: 1934–present

Major junctions
- South end: John Bryan State Park near Yellow Springs
- North end: SR 343 near Yellow Springs

Location
- Country: United States
- State: Ohio
- Counties: Greene

Highway system
- Ohio State Highway System; Interstate; US; State; Scenic
← SR 369	→ SR 371

State Route 370 (SR 370) is 1.21-mile (1.95 km) long north–south state highway in the western part of the U.S. state of Ohio. The highway runs from its southern terminus at the main entrance to John Bryan State Park nearly two miles (3.2 km) southeast of Yellow Springs to its northern terminus at SR 343 about 0.75 miles (1.21 km) east of Yellow Springs.

SR 370 was established in the middle of the 1930s. A spur route, it connects John Bryan State Park to the state highway system. This two-lane highway is located in the northern portion of Greene County.

== Route description ==
The entire 1.21-mile (1.95 km) length of SR 370 exists within the boundaries of Miami Township in northern Greene County. The highway begins at the main entrance to John Bryan State Park nearly 2 miles (3.2 km) southeast of Yellow Springs. As it travels to the north, SR 370 passes amidst a blend of open fields and woods, with a number of houses appearing alongside the highway. It arrives at its northern terminus where it intersects SR 343.

According to a 2008 survey by the Ohio Department of Transportation, an average of 250 passenger vehicles and 10 commercial vehicles travel the length of SR 370 on a daily basis. This route is not included as a part of the National Highway System.

== History ==
SR 370 was established in 1934. Throughout its history, SR 370 has served as a spur route off of SR 343 that provides access to John Bryan State Park. When it was first designated, the entirety of the route was a gravel roadway. The highway was paved by 1941. Since that time, the route has not experienced any changes of major significance.

== Major intersections ==
The entire route is in Miami Township, Greene County.

mi	km	Destinations	Notes
0.00	0.00	John Bryan State Park	Southern terminus at main entrance to state park
1.21	1.95	SR 343 / Meredith Road – Yellow Springs, Clifton	Northern terminus
1.000 mi = 1.609 km; 1.000 km = 0.621 mi
