= Plattsburg =

Plattsburg may refer to:

- Plattsburg, Indiana, U.S.
- Plattsburg, Missouri, U.S.
- USS Plattsburg (ID-1645), a United States Navy auxiliary cruiser

== See also ==
- Plattsburgh (disambiguation)
- Pittsburg (disambiguation)
- Pittsburgh (disambiguation)
