= Pittsburg, Georgia =

Pittsburg, Georgia refers to three places in the state of Georgia in the United States:

- Pittsburgh, Georgia (Fulton County)
- Pittsburg, Georgia (DeKalb County)
- Pittsburg, Georgia (Walker County)
