= Ohio State Route 343 =

State highway in Ohio, US

State Route 343

Route information
- Maintained by ODOT
- Length: 3.37 mi (5.42 km)
- Existed: 1933–present

Major junctions
- West end: US 68 in Yellow Springs
- East end: SR 72 in Clifton

Location
- Country: United States
- State: Ohio
- Counties: Greene, Clark

Highway system
- Ohio State Highway System; Interstate; US; State; Scenic
← SR 342	→ SR 344

State Route 343 (SR 343) is a short east-west state route in west-central Ohio. The western terminus of SR 343 is at U.S. Route 68 (US 68) in Yellow Springs, and its eastern terminus is at SR 72 in Clifton.

== Route description ==
SR 343 commences from a signalized intersection with US 68 in Yellow Springs. SR 343 generally traverses a rural backdrop through Miami Township, Greene County with a mix of woods and open fields, and the occasional house along the way. About one mile (1.6 km) east of US 68, SR 343 meets SR 370, the primary access route to John Bryan State Park, at its northern terminus. SR 343 continues east, then starts to trend southeasterly, brushing the northeastern portion of John Bryan State Park just prior to entering Clifton. Upon crossing into Clifton, SR 343 briefly ducks into Clark County, but re-enters Greene County, as it turns easterly, following North Street through the village prior to coming to an end at a T-intersection with SR 72.

== History ==
SR 343 came into existence in 1933 along the routing that it currently occupies. No significant changes have taken place to SR 343 since its designation.

== Major intersections ==
County	Location	mi	km	Destinations	Notes
Greene	Yellow Springs	0.00	0.00	US 68 (Xenia Avenue) / Cemetery Street	
Greene	Miami Township	1.01	1.63	SR 370 south / Meredith Road – John Bryan State Park	Northern terminus of SR 370
Clark	No major junctions				
Greene	Clifton	3.34	5.38	SR 72 (Main Street)	
1.000 mi = 1.609 km; 1.000 km = 0.621 mi
