= Song of America =

Song of America may refer to:

- MS Song of America, a cruise ship, now MS Celestyal Olympia
- Song of America (album), an album of songs related to the history of America
