= Herbert B. Tschudy =

- Born: Herbert Bolivar Judy; December 28, 1874; Plattsburgh, Ohio, U.S.
- Died: April 15, 1946 (aged 71); New York City, U.S.
- Education: University of Illinois; Art Students League New York
- Known for: Landscape painting
- Spouse: Gertrude E. Ridenour (m. 1903; died 1936)

Herbert Bolivar Tschudy (né Judy; December 28, 1874 – April 15, 1946) colloquially Herb Tschudy was an American landscape painter, artist and writer who served as curator of painting and sculpture of the Brooklyn Museum from 1923 to 1937.

Tschudy attended Antioch College and later graduated from the University of Illinois in architecture. Following a short stint as an art drawing instructor, he completed additional studies in Springfield, Ohio, ultimately moving to New York City, where he graduated from the Art Students League of New York in 1898. In the 1890s, he changed his last name to Tschudy, adopting the more genteel sounding -y spelling favored by internationally connected families (despite the original spelling of his family name being Tschudi).
