= Ertel Run =

Stream in Ohio, U.S.

Coordinates: 39°16′45″N 84°15′30″W

Ertel Run is a stream in the U.S. state of Ohio. It is a tributary to the Little Miami River.

Ertel Run was named after an early settler. A variant spelling was "Ertle Run".
