= David Littler =

David Littler may refer to:

- David Littler, British member of the Houghton Weavers
- David Littler, former British member of The Spitfire Boys
- David T. Littler (1836–1902), American politician and lawyer
