= Name of Pittsburgh =

Name of the city of Pittsburgh, Pennsylvania

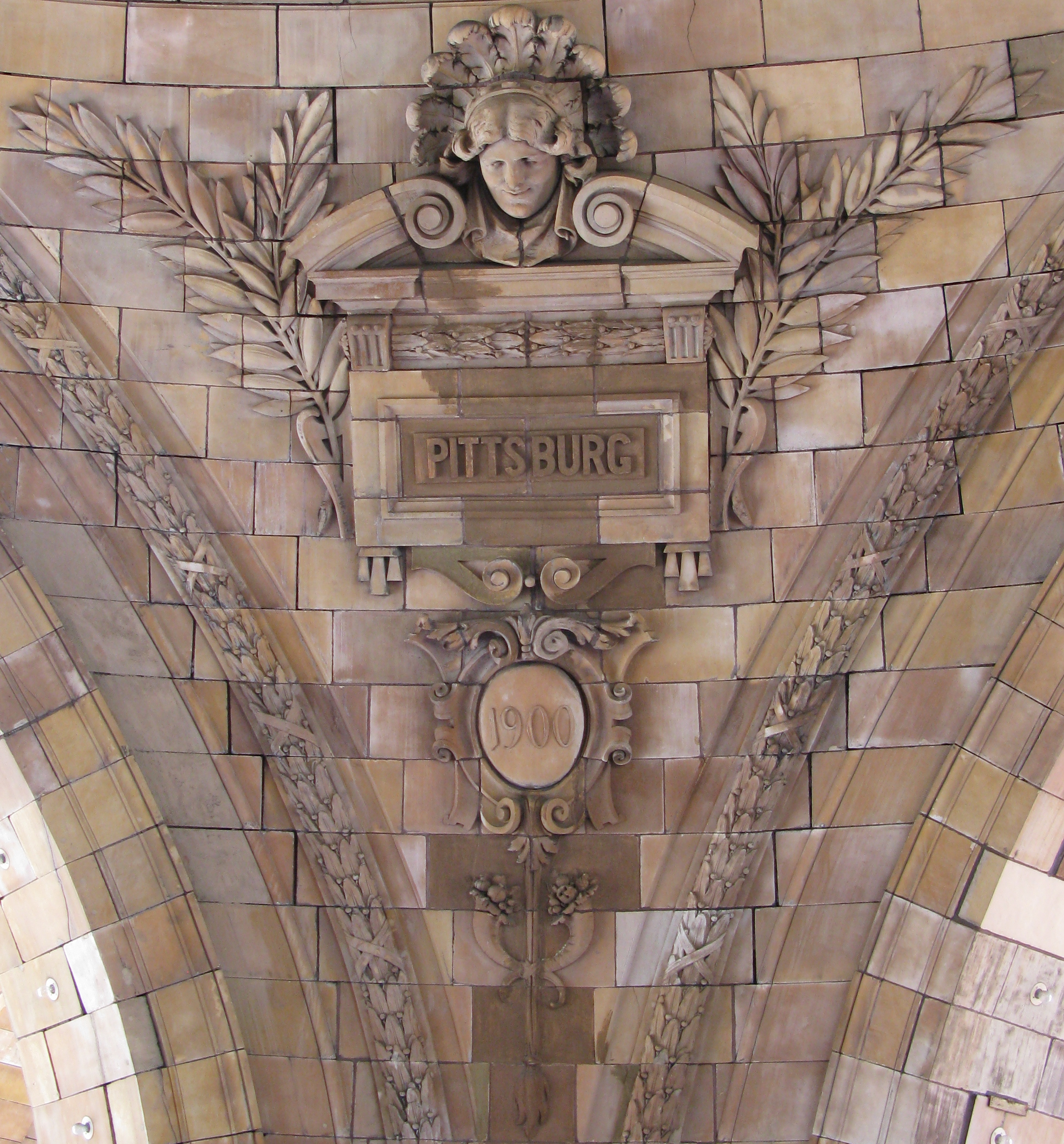
Inside of the rotunda of Union Station in Pittsburgh showing the city's name as commonly spelled in 1900.

The name of the city of Pittsburgh, Pennsylvania, has a complicated history. Pittsburgh is one of the few U.S. cities or towns to be spelled with an h at the end of a burg suffix, although the spelling Pittsburg was acceptable for many years and was even held as standard by the federal government (but not the city government) from 1891 to 1911.

== Etymology ==
Pittsburgh was named in honor of William Pitt, 1st Earl of Chatham, often referred to as William Pitt the Elder to distinguish him from his son William Pitt the Younger.

The word burgh is a variant of borough, which originally meant "fort" or "castle" but later came to mean "town", especially one with a municipal charter. (Note: See Etymology of Burgh for more details.)

== History and spellings ==
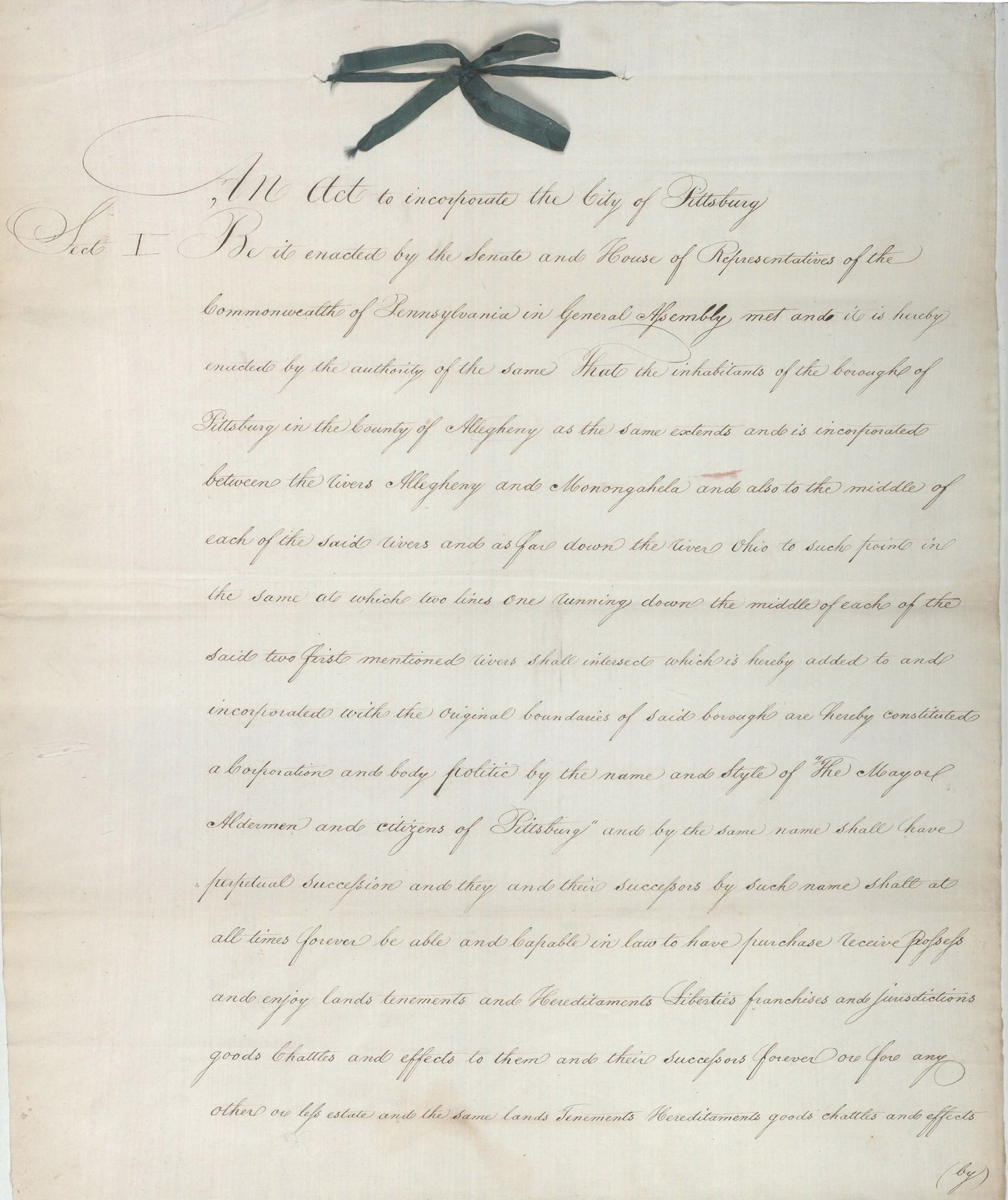
Pittsburgh is spelled without the h in its 1816 city charter.

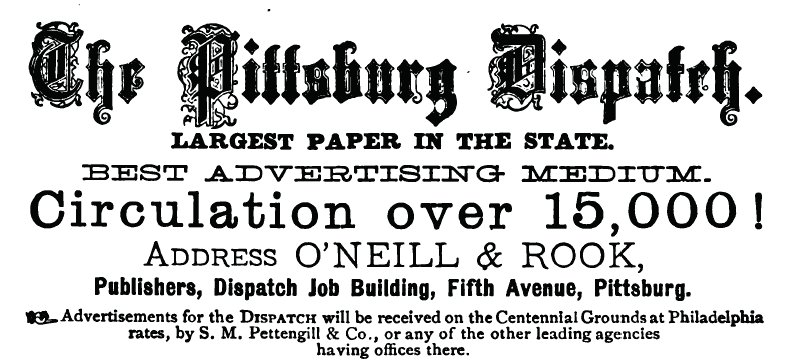
Advertisement for The Pittsburg Dispatch from 1876. The newspaper used the Pittsburg spelling from its second year (1847) to its end of publication in 1923.

Pittsburgh was named when British forces captured Fort Duquesne in the Forbes Expedition of the French and Indian War. The earliest known references to the new name of the settlement are in letters sent by General John Forbes, dated 26 and 27 November 1758, reporting the capture of the fort. In copies of and quotes from those letters in later sources, the name of Pittsburgh is spelled with and without the h, and sometimes with an o before the u. (Note: The form of the name appearing in a letter sent by Forbes to Lieutenant-Governor William Denny, dated 26 November 1758, is given in discrepant sources as Pittsbourg, Pitts-Bourgh, Pitts-Bourg, Pittsburgh, and Pittsburg. The name appearing in other letters has been transcribed as Pittsbourg (Forbes to Generals Abercromby and Amherst, 26 November 1758), and Pittsbourgh (Forbes to William Pitt, 27 November 1758).) As a Scotsman, General Forbes probably pronounced the name /ˈpɪtsbərə/ PITS-bər-ə, similar to the pronunciation of "Edinburgh" as a Scotsman would say it: /ˈɛdɪnbərə/ ED-in-bər-ə. The name appeared in print at least as early as 14 December 1758, when the Pennsylvania Gazette published a letter written by a member of Forbes's army from "Pittsburgh (formerly Fort Duquesne)".

For a long time, there was little regard for uniformity in the spelling of Pittsburgh's name. Early municipal documents and city directories generally spelled the name with a final h, but the letter is notably omitted in the city charter enacted by the state legislature in 1816. The variance in spelling persisted through the 19th century. In 1890, some local newspapers were using the final h and some were not.

Relative frequency of Pittsburgh (blue) vs. Pittsburg (red) word forms in English-language books over time, according to Google Ngram Viewer data. Usage of Pittsburg has practically disappeared except in errors or in reference to places other than the Pennsylvania city.

The name of the city was normally spelled without an h in German (including Pennsylvania Dutch), in which geographical names ending in -burg and -berg (and never followed by an h) are very common.

=== Federal board decisions ===
In 1890, the United States Board on Geographic Names was created to establish uniform place name usage throughout the various departments and agencies of the U.S. government. To guide its standardization efforts, the Board adopted thirteen general principles, one of which was that the final -h should be dropped from place names ending in -burgh. The Board compiled a report of place name "decisions" in 1891 in which Pittsburgh's name for federal government purposes was rendered Pittsburg. (Note: Because the Board lacked the immediate means to publish and distribute its decisions (see pp. 9–10 of the report), its report was not actually printed in volume and distributed until 1892. The actual finalized decisions and recommendations do date to 1891, however.)

In support of its decision favoring the Pittsburg spelling, the Board referenced the 1816 city charter. The full decision and rationale from the Board follows:

Pittsburg. Pennsylvania.
The city was chartered in 1816, its name being spelled without the h, and its official form is still Pittsburg. The h appears to have been added by the Post-Office Department, and through that action local usage appears to have become divided. While the majority of local newspapers print it without the h, certain others use the final h.

The Board's decisions were compulsory upon all federal government agencies, including the Post Office. Outside the federal government, the decisions, while highly influential, were not officially binding. The Pittsburgh city government continued to use the spelling with the h, as did such local institutions as the Pittsburgh Gazette, the Pittsburgh Stock Exchange and the University of Pittsburgh. In 1908, a Pittsburgh Chamber of Commerce committee, after conducting a review of historical documents, endorsed Pittsburgh as the proper way to spell the city's name and looked toward getting that spelling federally recognized. Responding to mounting pressure and, in the end, political pressure from senator George T. Oliver, the names board reversed itself and added an h to its spelling of the city on July 19, 1911. The letter sent to Senator Oliver to announce this decision, dated July 20, stated:

Hon. George T. Oliver, United States Senate:

Sir: At a special meeting of the United States Geographic Board held on July 19, 1911, the previous decision with regard to the spelling of Pittsburgh without a final H was reconsidered and the form given below was adopted:

Pittsburgh, a city in Pennsylvania (not Pittsburg).

Very respectfully,
C. S. SLOAN,

Secretary.

With the spelling controversy largely settled, the h-less form of the city's name headed toward extinction. There were some holdouts: the city's largest-circulation newspaper, The Pittsburg Press, adhered to the shorter spelling until 1921; The Pittsburg Dispatch and The Pittsburg Leader did so until ceasing publication in 1923.

Many cities across the United States named after the city of Pittsburgh, such as Pittsburg, Kansas, Pittsburg, California, and West Pittsburg, Pennsylvania, continue to use the Pittsburg spelling in their names. Other independent municipalities, such as the borough of East Pittsburgh, Pennsylvania, reflect the modern spelling.

=== Baseball card ===
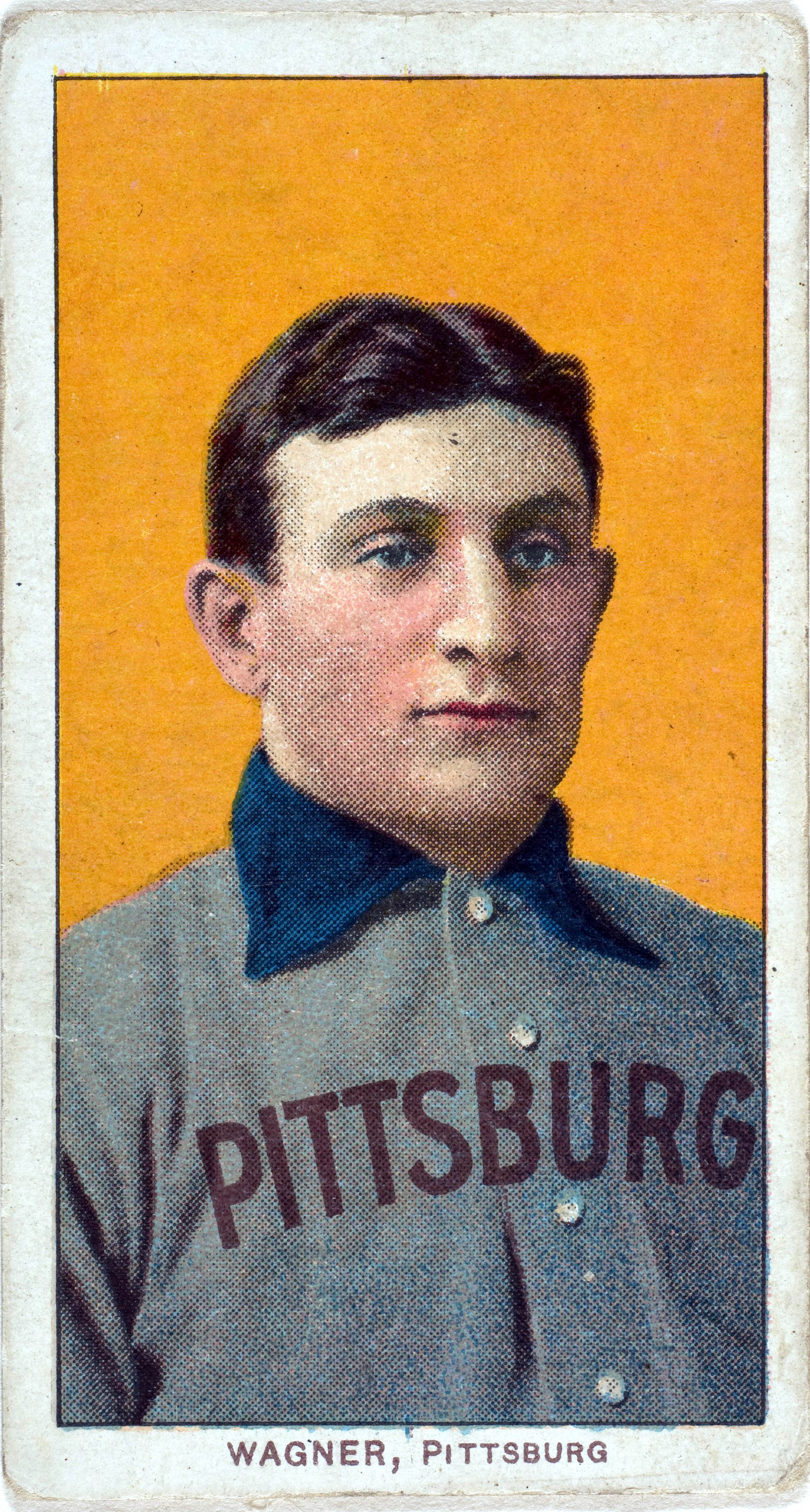
The T-206 Honus Wagner baseball card from 1909

Perhaps the most familiar reference to the Pittsburg spelling is on the renowned 1909 T-206 baseball card of Pittsburgh Pirates legend Honus Wagner. Its scarcity, even at the time, combined with Wagner's reputation as one of the greatest players in baseball history, made it the most valuable sports card of all time, with one pristine specimen yielding $6.61 million (equivalent to $7.85 million in 2025) at auction. It has been characterized as the "Holy Grail" of baseball cards. The city name displayed across Wagner's jersey on the card was an artistic addition that did not actually appear on the Pirates' uniforms of the time. The portrait of Wagner makes it appear as if there could be an H on the end, cut off by the border of the picture, but this notion is countered by the appearance of "PITTSBURG" in the underlying caption and on other Pirate portraits from the T-206 card set.

=== The -h in Pittsburgh culture ===
The presence of the -h at the end of the word Pittsburgh is occasionally recognized in Pittsburgh culture. "Da 'Burgh" or "Da Burgh" is an affectionate local nickname for the city. PGH is a common three-letter abbreviation for the city name, for example as the Amtrak code for Union Station (although the IATA airport code for Pittsburgh International Airport is PIT). The first City Connect jersey of the Pittsburgh Pirates features PGH written across the chest. The abbreviation is part of the call sign of WPGH-TV, the area's network affiliate of Fox. Pittsburgh Water and Sewer Authority's brand of bottled water, PGH_{2}O, is a portmanteau of PGH and the chemical formula for water, H_{2}O.

Conversely, in homage to the city's history, the "Pittsburg Plunge" at Kennywood amusement park retains the alternate spelling without the h.

== See also ==
- Alburgh, Vermont, a town whose name was changed from Alburgh to Alburg in the 19th century, apparently by influence of the same 1891 decision that applied to the spelling of Pittsburgh. The Alburgh spelling was restored in 2006.
- Newburgh, New York, another early U.S. city with a trailing h.
- Plattsburgh, New York, another early U.S. city with a trailing h, located in the northeastern corner of the state.
- Pittsburg (disambiguation), other places with the h-less spelling
