= Song of America (album) =

Compilation album by Various artists
- Released: September 18, 2007
- Genre: Folk
- Label: Split Rock / 31 Tigers
- Producers: David Macias, Bob Olhsson, Ed Pettersen

Professional ratings
Review scores
Source	Rating
Allmusic	4/5 stars
Uncut	4/5 stars

Song of America is a 3-disc, compilation album comprising 50 songs related to the history of America. Released on September 18, 2007 under Split Rock Records/Thirty One Tigers, the music collection was conceived by former U.S. Attorney General Janet Reno and musician Ed Pettersen (who is married to Reno's niece).

== Track listing ==
Disc 1

1. "Lakota Dream Song", performed by Earl Bullhead – 3:08
2. "Once More Our God Vouchsafe to Shine", performed by Julie Lee – 3:07
3. "Let Us Break Bread Together", performed by The Blind Boys of Alabama – 3:49
4. "God Save the King", performed by John Wesley Harding – 3:49
5. "Young Ladies in Town", performed by Elizabeth Foster – 3:01
6. "The Old Woman Taught Wisdom", performed by Malcom Holcombe – 6:30
7. "The Liberty Song", performed by Ed Pettersen – 4:59
8. "Yankee Doodle", performed by Harper Simon – 3:29
9. "Jefferson & Liberty", performed by The Wilders – 2:10
10. "Hail Columbia", performed by Steven Kowalczyk-Santoro – 2:56
11. "The Star Spangled Banner", performed by Take 6 – 2:04
12. "Sometimes I Feel Like a Motherless Child", performed by Beth Nielsen Chapman – 5:09
13. "Peg & Awl", performed by Freedy Johnston – 4:34
14. "Sweet Betsy From Pike", performed by BR549 – 4:23
15. "Trail of Tears", performed by Will & Jehnean – 4:35
16. "Declaration of Sentiments", performed by Minton Sparks/Pat Flynn – 4:34
17. "Go Down Moses", performed by Fisk Jubilee Singers – 3:44
18. "Dixie's Land", performed by The Mavericks, featuring Thad Cockrell – 6:13

Disc 2

1. "John Brown's Body", performed by Marah – 2:40
2. "Battle Hymn of the Republic", performed by Joanna Smith – 5:15
3. "Johnny I Hardly Knew Ye", performed by Janis Ian – 2:09
4. "Thousands Are Sailing to Amerikay", performed by Tim O'Brien – 4:24
5. "The Farmer is the Man", performed by Otis Gibbs – 3:03
6. "Home On the Range", performed by Joni Harms – 4:30
7. "Stars and Stripes Forever", performed by Jake Shimabukuro – 2:28
8. "Sleep, My Child (Schlof Mayn Kind)", performed by Judith Edelman and Neilson Hubbard – 4:47
9. "Over There", performed by Jen Chapin – 2:31
10. "How You Gonna Keep 'Em Down On the Farm", performed by Andrew Bird – 5:04
11. "Lift Every Voice and Sing", performed by Karen Parks – 5:11
12. "Happy Days Are Here Again", performed by Danielson – 3:05
13. "Brother Can You Spare a Dime?", performed by Andy Bey – 6:30
14. "Seven Cent Cotton and Forty Cent Meat", performed by Jim Lauderdale – 2:11
15. "Deportee (Plane Wreck at Los Gatos)", performed by Old Crow Medicine Show – 4:56
16. "Rosie the Riveter", performed by Suzy Bogguss – 2:31
17. "Reuben James", performed by Folk Family Robinson – 4:04

Disc 3

1. "The Great Atomic Power", performed by Elizabeth Cook and The Grascals – 2:45
2. "Little Boxes", performed by Devendra Banhart – 4:08
3. "The Times They Are a-Changin'", performed by The Del McCoury Band – 3:49
4. "Apache Tears", performed by Scott Kempner – 3:42
5. "Get Together", performed by Kim Richey – 4:01
6. "Say It Loud - I'm Black and I'm Proud", performed by The Dynamites with Charles Walker – 4:32
7. "Ohio", performed by Ben Taylor – 2:40
8. "What's Going On", performed by Anthony David – 5:02
9. "I Am Woman", performed by Martha Wainwright – 3:27
10. "Youngstown", performed by Matthew Ryan – 4:14
11. "Wave," performed by Gary Heffern and Chris Eckman – 4:35
12. "The Message", performed by Shortee – 6:34
13. "Streets of Philadelphia", performed by Bettye LaVette – 3:49
14. "Where Were You When the World Stopped Turning", performed by The Wrights – 5:30
15. "This Land is Your Land", performed by John Mellencamp – 4:10

== Personnel ==
- Peter Abbott – Percussion, backing vocalist
- Brad Albetta – producer, instrumentation
- Jack Ashford – vibraphone
- Bob Babbitt – bass
- Mike Bailey – drums
- Devendra Banhart – acoustic guitar, vocals
- Kevin Barker – acoustic guitar, electric guitar
- Will Barrow – piano
- Alan Bartram – bass
- Tom Bee – producer
- Andy Bey – piano, vocals
- David Bielanko – arranger
- Serge Bielanko – guitar, arranger, backing vocalist
- Andrew Bird – violin, arranger, electric guitar, vocals, whistle (human)
- Leo Black – guitar, arranger, producer, horn arrangements
- Suzy Bogguss – vocals
- Jimmy Bowland – horn, saxophone
- BR549 – arranger
- Earl Bullhead – arranger, vocals
- Andy Cabic – backing vocalist
- Jason Carter – fiddle
- Vincent Chancey – French horn
- Jen Chapin – vocals, producer
- Beth Nielsen Chapman – arranger, vocals, producer, gut string guitar, bazouki
- Ernest Chapman – steel guitar, backing vocalist
- Alvin Chea – vocals
- Larry Ciancia – drums
- Vinnie Ciesielski – horn
- Thad Cockrell – arranger, vocals
- Elizabeth Cook – vocals, producer
- Stephan Crump – bass, producer
- Anthony David – acoustic guitar, vocals, backing vocalist
- Scott Davis – assistant engineer
- Mickey Dawes – drums
- Paul Deakin – arranger, drums
- Cedric Dent – vocals
- Tyrone Dickerson – organ
- Chris Eckman – producer, engineer, performer, choir arrangement
- Judith Edelman – acoustic guitar, arranger, vocals
- Terry Eldredge – acoustic guitar, vocals
- Betse Ellis – fiddle, arranger, producer
- Rich Feaster – engineer, mixing
- Curtis Fields – tenor (vocal)
- Pat Flynn – guitar, arranger
- Elizabeth Foster – arranger
- Brian Fulk – engineer
- Critter Fuqua – vocals, button accordion
- Noah Georgeson – backing vocalist
- Otis Gibbs – acoustic guitar, arranger, vocals
- Steve Gluzband – trumpet
- Janja Gomboc – choir, chorus
- Ranger Doug Green – vocals
- Ed Greene – percussion, drums
- Paul Hammond – mastering
- John Wesley Harding – arranger, vocals
- Joni Harms – arranger, vocals
- Otto Hauser – drums, backing vocalist
- David R. Hayden – tenor (vocal)
- Kevin Hayes – guitjo
- Gary Heffern – vocals, assistant project coordinator
- Don Herron – banjo, fiddle, mandolin, backing vocalist
- Donnie Herron – fiddle
- Alan Hill – keyboards
- Will Hill – Native American flute, cultural advisor, language consultant, spoken word
- Malcolm Holcombe – acoustic guitar, vocals
- Ericson Holt – keyboards
- Neilson Hubbard – bass, arranger, glockenspiel, keyboards, backing vocalist, producer
- Scotty Huff – acoustic guitar
- Carter William Humphrey – engineer
- David Hungate – bass
- Andy Hunt – backing vocalist, mixing, Ngawang Chopel
- Shirley Hutchins – administration
- Kenny Hutson – guitar, mandolin
- Janis Ian – arranger, vocals, producer
- Jack Irwin – engineer
- Morgan Jahnig – bass (upright)
- Erick Jaskowiak – engineer
- Freedy Johnston – guitar, arranger, vocals, backing vocalist
- Herb Jordan – producer
- Nick Kane – electric guitar
- Scott Kempner – bass, guitar, vocals
- Joel Kibble – vocals
- Mark Kibble – vocals, engineer
- Craig King – piano, arranger
- Jason Kourkounis – arranger, drums
- Dave Kowalski – engineer
- Viktor Krauss – bass
- Paul T. Kwami – musical direction
- Jim Lauderdale – banjo, vocals
- Bettye LaVette – vocals
- Julie Lee – vocals, baritone ukulele
- David Leonard – mixing
- Kimberly Levitan – design
- David Macias – compilation producer
- Paul Mahern – engineer
- Joe Martino – assistant engineer
- Catherine Styron Marx – keyboards
- Rogers Masson – mixing
- Jimmy Mattingly – fiddle
- Josiah Mazzaschi – engineer
- Mac McAnally – producer
- Del McCoury – guitar, vocals, producer
- Rob McCoury – banjo
- Ronnie McCoury – mandolin, producer
- Country Joe McDonald – vocals, penny whistle
- Jerry Dale McFadden – keyboards
- Claude V. McKnight III – vocals
- Eamon McLoughlin – strings
- Chuck Mead – guitar, vocals
- John Mellencamp – guitar, vocals, producer
- Mark "Guitar" Miller – bass
- Rob Mitchell – drums
- John Mock – tin whistle
- Patrick Murphy – engineer
- Tim O'Brien – fiddle, guitar, arranger, vocals
- Bob Olhsson – engineer, mastering, mixing, compilation producer
- Karen Parks – vocals
- Chris "Chris P" "PowerTool" Patterson – percussion
- Marcelo Pennell – engineer, mixing
- Dave Peterson – drums
- Ed Pettersen – bass, guitar, percussion, piano, arranger, keyboards, theremin, vocals, backing vocalist, producer, engineer, liner notes, mixing, compilation producer
- Walker Pettibone – drums
- Dirk Powell – engineer
- Valerie Pringle – backing vocalist
- Jonathan Quarmby – Hammond organ, producer, mixing
- Lorne Rall – bass
- Andy Reis – guitar, electric guitar
- Robert Reynolds – bass, arranger
- Kim Richey – acoustic guitar, vocals, backing vocalist
- Peter Robbins – engineer, mixing
- Todd Robbins – engineer, mixing
- Danny Roberts – mandolin
- Rich Robinson – guitar, vocals
- Stan Robinson – vocals
- Marcus Rojas – tuba
- Michael Rubin – producer
- Matthew Ryan – keyboards, vocals
- Aaron Sands – bass
- Pat Sansone – acoustic guitar, piano, engineer
- Tamara Saviano – project manager
- David Saw – guitar
- Ketcham Secor – vocals, bajo sexto
- Danny Seward – backing vocalist
- Ike Sheldon – guitar
- Jake Shimabukuro – arranger, ukulele
- Scott Shipley – multiple instruments
- Harper Simon – bass, guitar, arranger, vocals, producer
- Paul Sinclair – mastering
- Elin K. Smith – vocals
- Mindy Smith – backing vocalist
- Minton Sparks – arranger, vocals
- Garrison Starr – backing vocalist
- David Talbot – banjo
- Christopher Thomas – bass
- David Thomas – vocals
- Wesley Trigg – tenor (vocal)
- Ted Velykis – arranger, bass guitar
- Wanda Vick – banjo, fiddle, mandolin
- Philip Wade – mandolin
- Martha Wainwright – vocals, backing vocalist
- Charles E. Walker – vocals
- M. Warren – arranger
- Willie Watson – guitar, vocals
- Kenzie Wetz – fiddle, vocals, backing vocalist
- Willy Will – producer, engineer
- Mark Wilson IV – bass
- Adam Wright – guitar, vocals
- Kirk Yoquelet – percussion, drums
- Kate York – backing vocalist
