= Glen Helen Nature Preserve =

Nature reserve in Ohio, United States

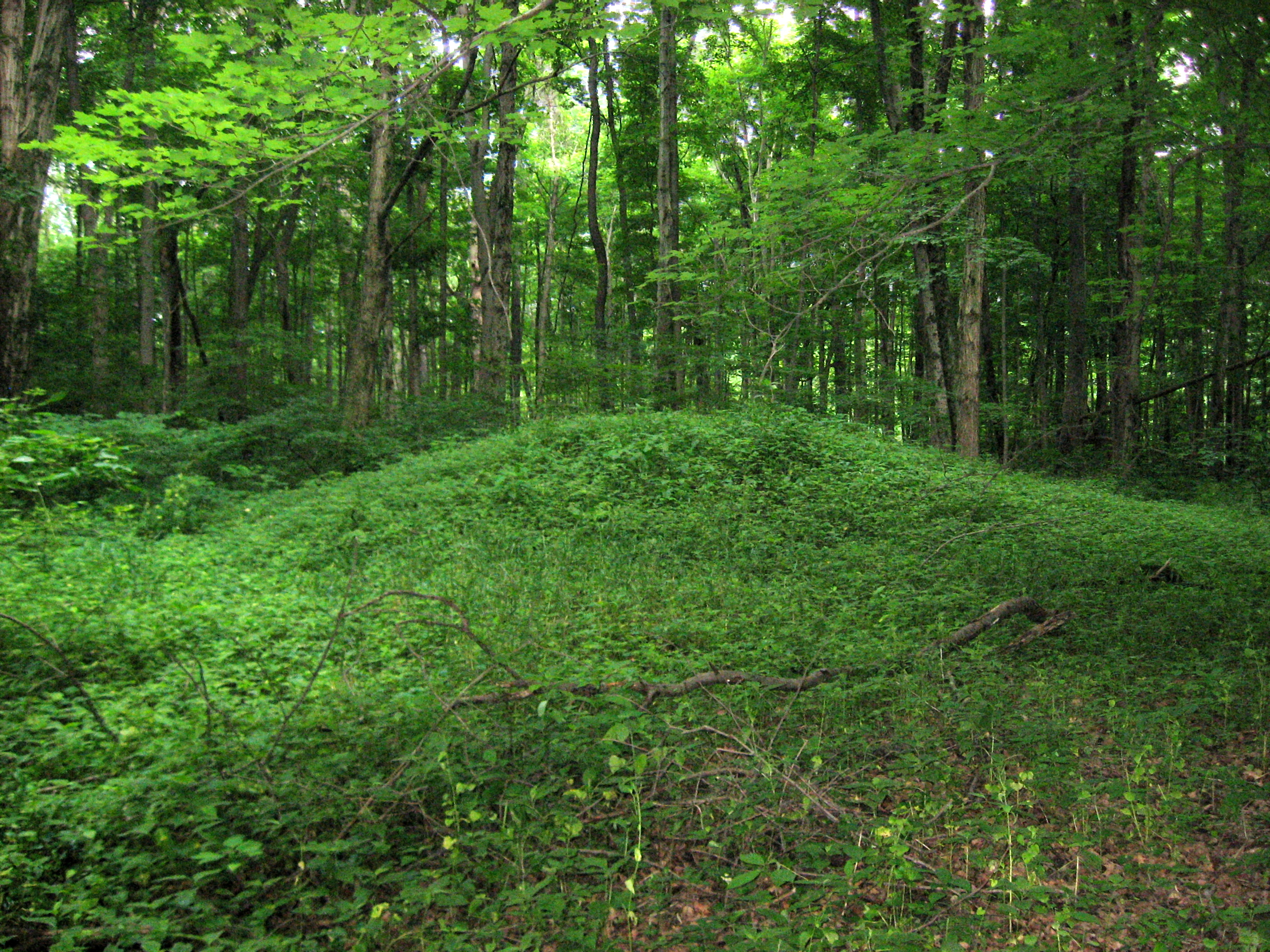
- A Native American burial mound located in the Glen, just uphill from the Yellow Spring

- Location within Ohio Location within the United States
- Location: Greene County, Ohio
- Nearest city: Yellow Springs
- Coordinates: 39°47′55″N 83°53′00″W
- Area: 1,004 acres (406 ha)
- Established: 1929
- Owner: Glen Helen Association
- Website: glenhelenassociation.org

U.S. National Natural Landmark
- Designated: 1965

The Glen Helen Nature Preserve is a nature reserve immediately east of Yellow Springs, Ohio, United States. The initial 700-acre parcel was given to Antioch College by Hugh Taylor Birch in memory of his daughter Helen Birch Bartlett in 1929, and is the largest private nature preserve in the region.

== About ==
The Glen is immediately adjacent to the main Antioch College campus (which itself contains restored natural areas managed by The Glen) and stretches in land area for 1,147 acres (464 ha). Together with the 752 acres (304 ha) of the John Bryan State Park and the 268 acres (108 ha) of the Clifton Gorge State Nature Preserve, the area comprises a river corridor of over 2,100 contiguous acres that has been rated "exceptional" by the Ohio Department of Natural Resources for its cleanliness and biodiversity. The preserve was designated a National Natural Landmark in 1965.

The patches of land now included in Glen Helen previously had a number of different uses. While some were always natural, other areas were farmed, some grazed, and some extensively logged. The oldest trees in the Glen might be 400 years old, but there are many newer areas of forest 90 years old or younger. The Glen is actively managed to weed out non-native invasive species of plants like bush honeysuckle and Japanese stiltgrass; about 30 to 40 acres a year of honeysuckle are cleared. Those areas are then planted with native species like baby spicebushes, sumac, goldenrod, and sedge, which helps return the land to its original state and keeps the invasive species at bay.

The Glen features more than twenty miles of publicly accessible trails and includes 2.5 miles of the National Scenic Little Miami River, regionally significant stands of old-growth forest, a distinct rock column known as Pompeii's Pillar, ecologically reclaimed farm land, the Orators Mound (a Adena burial mound), and the Yellow Spring, for which the town is named.

The preserve was a learning laboratory for Antioch College, supporting academic offerings as well as faculty and student research, and also offering a wide variety of public programs and outreach to the wider Miami Valley region.

The Glen had a long-time "friends" organization known as the Glen Helen Association ("GHA"). The roots of the GHA came about in 1960, with ultimately-successful efforts to save the Glen from a proposed highway bypass and then a sewer line. The GHA became an official nonprofit organization in 1979, with the continuing mission of helping to support Glen Helen.

Antioch College closed Glen Helen to the public on March 25, 2020, in connection with the COVID-19 outbreak. The Antioch College Board of Trustees stated in May 2020 that the college had no plans to reopen the preserve, since it could no longer afford to support the operation. Antioch held talks with GHA, and on June 10 an agreement in principle was announced transferring the Glen to GHA for about $2.5 million, payable by an upfront payment of $500,000, annual payments of $50,000 for 10 years, and a "balloon" payment of $1.5 million at the end of the 10 years. The transfer of ownership was complete on September 4, 2020. While GHA got funding for the upfront payment from existing proceeds in a term endowment fund, it began major fundraising to rehire staff, reopen the Glen, restart educational programs, replenish the Glen's endowments, and address deferred maintenance on buildings and grounds. Fundraising of $4.25 million toward these goals was achieved in late February 2024.

== Facilities ==
The Glen Helen Raptor Center rehabilitates injured birds with the goal of releasing them back to the wild, and also offers education about raptors and their role in Ohio ecosystems.

The Vernet Ecological Center, named for Sergius Vernet who invented the wax thermostatic element, is located on the western edge of The Glen and houses an auditorium, complete with a stage, video projection and sound system, that seats up to 140 (or 80 with tables); a patio; a Nature Shop; offices; and, the Atrium Gallery which exhibits contemporary art by local and regional artists. The building, with its unique curved limestone walls and vertical lines of rough-hewn yellow pine, was built in 1973, but was rededicated in late 2012 after significant upgrades including an energy-efficient geothermal heating and cooling system and an insulated cork floor.

The Trailside Museum was built in 1952 by Antioch College students, and was substantially renovated when reopened in the summer of 2024 after having been shuttered since 2020. It has traditionally been the weekend welcome center for Glen Helen, and features hands-on displays and exhibits.

The Glen Helen Outdoor Education Center (OEC) can be found in the northeast corner of the Glen Helen Nature Preserve. The OEC hosts school and other organizational groups and has developed programs to develop their appreciation of the natural world and an awareness of environmental problems along with the ecological principles that influence them. The physical facilities include the Outdoor Education Center Lodge which has a Cafeteria-style dining room suitable for up to 120 people, and three Dormitories each sleeping 36–40.

Camp Greene, a former Girl Scout Camp which added about 30 acres to The Glen in 2015, offers a 1920s era lodge which can accommodate up to 200 people, as well as dormitory facilities.

Birch Manor is a 1931 Georgian-style mansion designed by architect William Shilling. It was home to Hugh Taylor Birch, the benefactor who two years previous had donated the initial 700 acres for the preserve, and Birch lived there seasonally for a decade before dying at age 94. As originally built the house had 11 rooms, nine bathrooms, eight fireplaces, and a garage with servant's quarters. However, when Antioch College President James Dixon lived there, he added additional rooms, bringing the total up to 18. The space is suitable for up to 150 people outdoors or 110 people indoors.

The Grinnell Mill Bed & Breakfast was originally constructed in 1813 as a water-powered grist mill. This accommodation is located on the banks of the Little Miami River.

Many of the Glen Helen facilities, including the Vernet Ecological Center, the Outdoor Education Center Lodge and Dormitories, Camp Green, Birch Manor, the Grinnell Mill, and even a meadow, are rentable event venues available for special functions.

The Riding Centre, a therapeutic equestrian facility, is physically located on land leased from Glen Helen, but is operated separately.
