= California, Cincinnati =

Coordinates: 39°03′55″N 84°25′24″W

California
- Neighborhood of Cincinnati
- Flag

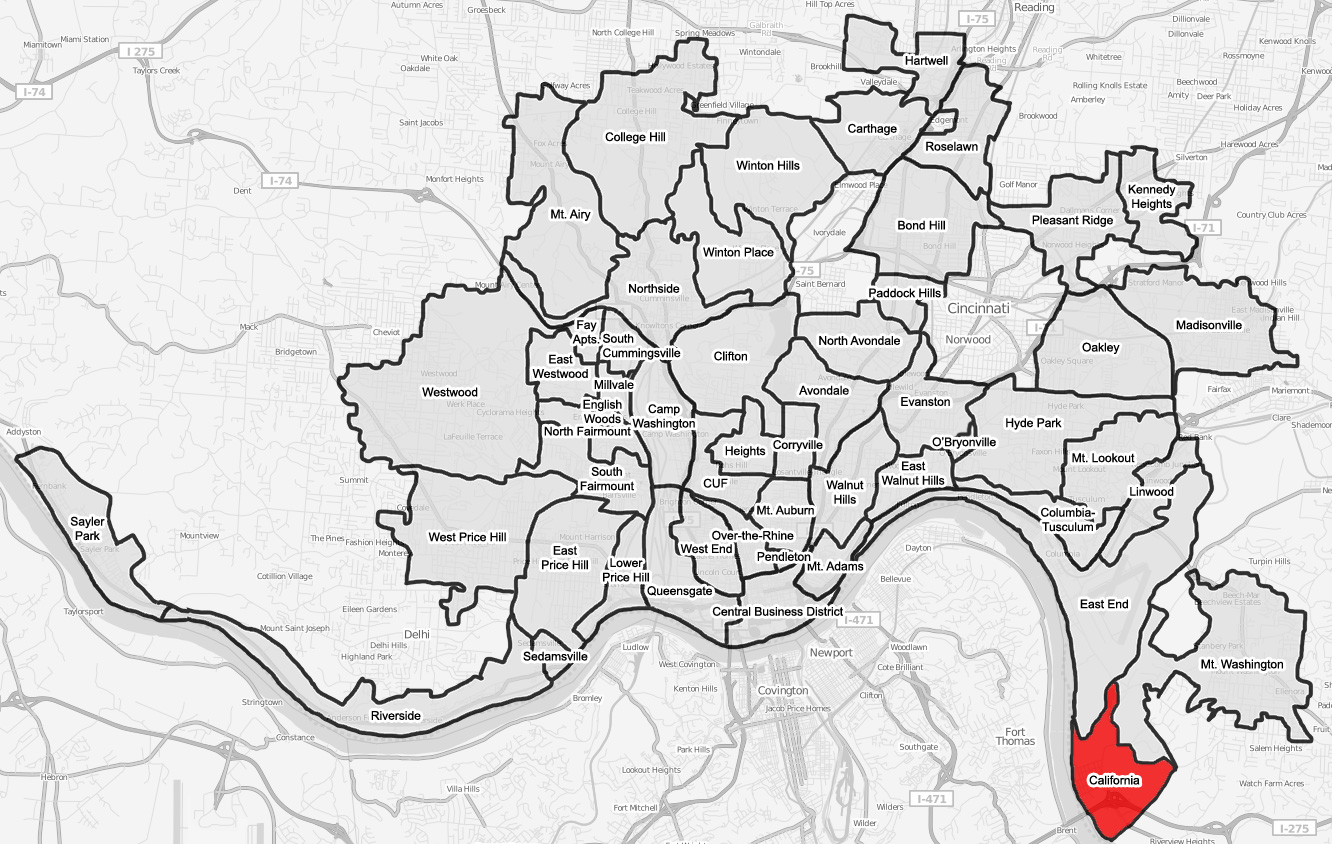
- California (red) within Cincinnati
- Country: United States
- State: Ohio
- City: Cincinnati

Population (2020)
  - Total: 944
- ZIP code: 45230

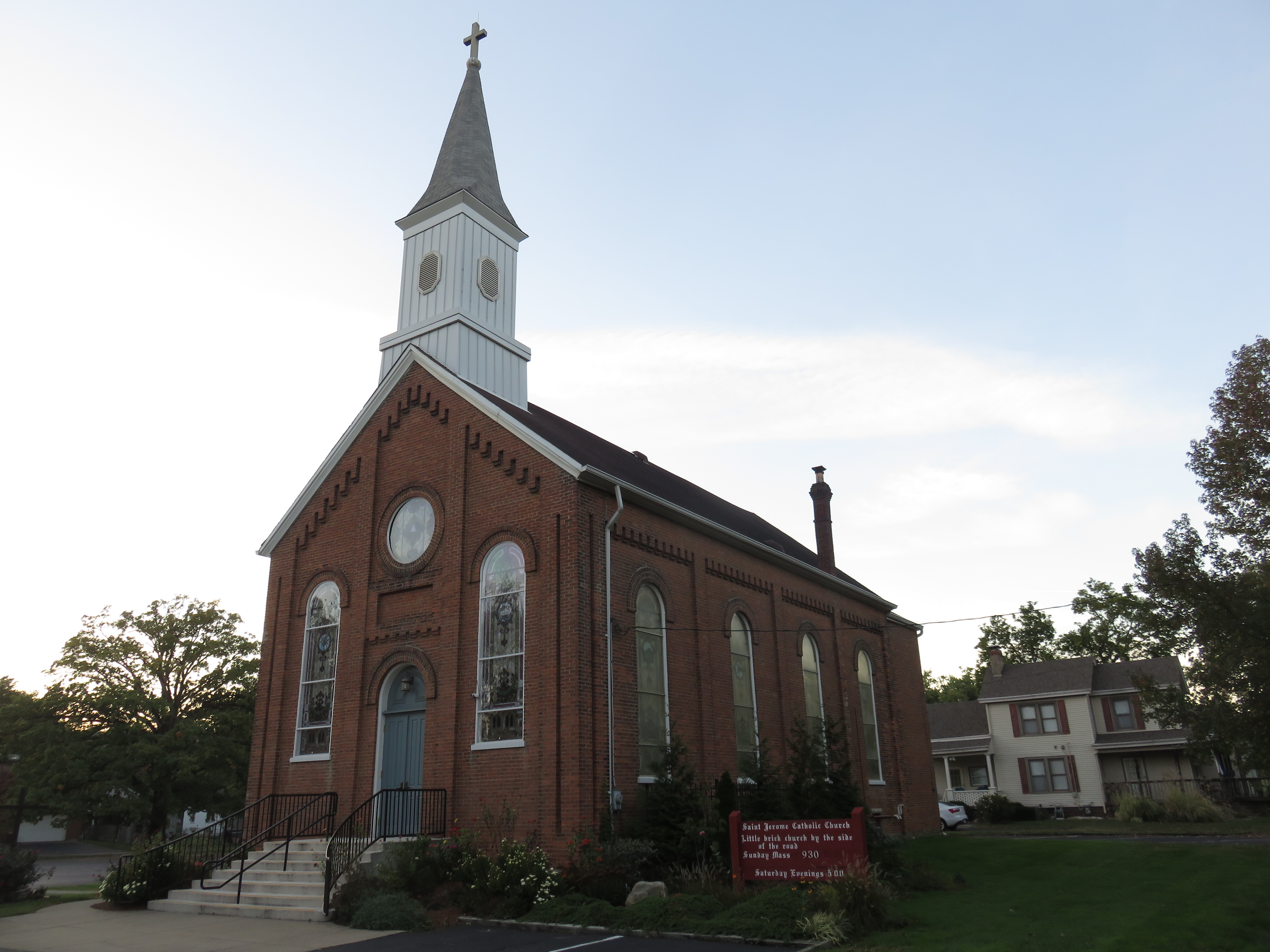
St. Jerome Church in California, Cincinnati

California, Cincinnati is one of the 52 neighborhoods of Cincinnati, Ohio. Located at the confluence of the Little Miami River and Ohio River, it is the southeastern-most neighborhood in the city. California borders the Cincinnati neighborhoods of Mt. Washington and the East End, as well as Anderson Township. The population was 944 at the 2020 census.

== History ==
The community was named after the state of California. California was annexed by the city of Cincinnati in 1909.

== Demographics ==
As of the census of 2020, there were 944 people living in the neighborhood. There were 452 housing units. The racial makeup of the neighborhood was 89.6% White, 2.0% Black or African American, 0.0% Native American, 1.4% Asian, 0.0% Pacific Islander, 0.1% from some other race, and 6.9% from two or more races. 2.1% of the population were Hispanic or Latino of any race.

There were 323 households, out of which 63.8% were families. 33.7% of all households were made up of individuals.

15.1% of the neighborhood's population were under the age of 18, 68.7% were 18 to 64, and 16.2% were 65 years of age or older. 41.4% of the population was male and 58.6% was female.

According to the U.S. Census American Community Survey, for the period 2016-2020 the estimated median annual income for a household in the neighborhood was $112,875. About 0.0% of family households were living below the poverty line. About 48.6% had a bachelor's degree or higher.

== Landmarks ==
California is adjacent to several major recreation and entertainment venues located just outside the neighborhood in Anderson Township, including the Riverbend Music Center, Belterra Park Gaming & Entertainment Center, and the historic Coney Island site. Within the neighborhood itself, California Woods Nature Preserve provides acres of protected forest and hiking trails.

== Notable person ==
- Brice Disque, business executive and soldier
