= Ohio State Route 369 =

State highway in Clark County, Ohio, US

State Route 369

Route information
- Maintained by ODOT
- Length: 1.45 mi (2.33 km)
- Existed: 1934–present

Major junctions
- South end: SR 4 near Enon
- North end: US 40 near Donnelsville

Location
- Country: United States
- State: Ohio
- Counties: Clark

Highway system
- Ohio State Highway System; Interstate; US; State; Scenic
← SR 368	→ SR 370

State Route 369 (SR 369) is a short, two-lane north–south state highway in the western portion of the U.S. state of Ohio. The southern terminus of SR 369 is at an interchange with SR 4 approximately two and a half miles (4.0 km) northeast of Enon. Its northern terminus is at U.S. Route 40 (US 40) nearly one and a half miles (2.4 km) east of Donnelsville. SR 369 was created in the mid-1930s. In addition to serving as a connector between SR 4 and US 40 southwest of Springfield, it provides access to a county park named in honor of George Rogers Clark.

== Route description ==
All of SR 369 is situated within Bethel Township in the southwestern quadrant of Clark County. The route starts at an interchange with SR 4 approximately two and a half miles (4.0 km) northeast of Enon. SR 369 serves as a continuation of Lower Valley Pike, which enters the interchange from the North of SR 4, the west side of SR 369 abuts a residential subdivision, while the east side of the route straddles the western portion of the county–maintained George Rogers Clark Park. As the highway proceeds north of the park boundary, both sides of the highway are lined with houses, leading up to the point where it comes to an end at US 40 nearly one and a half miles (2.4 km) east of Donnelsville. Continuing to the north of the U.S. route following the terminus of SR 369 is Tecumseh Road.

SR 369 is maintained by the Ohio Department of Transportation (ODOT). As a part of its duties in maintaining this highway, ODOT tracks the volume of traffic using it by a metric called the average annual daily traffic (AADT). This measurement determines the amount of traffic utilizing a particular stretch of the roadway on a typical day of the year. A 2008 AADT report shows that the busiest stretch of SR 369 is the portion in the vicinity of the SR 4 interchange, at the Lower Valley Pike transition, where typically 2,900 passenger vehicles and 220 commercial vehicles use the highway on a daily basis. The AADT along the portion of SR 369 between SR 4 and US 40 was determined to be 1,580 passenger vehicles and 120 commercial vehicles. SR 369 is not included within the National Highway System.

== History ==
SR 369 was first designated in 1934. Originally, the route was a spur route off of US 40 that served George Rogers Clark Park. In 1959, with the relocation of SR 4 onto a new freeway alignment along the north side of the Mad River through this vicinity, the southern terminus of SR 369 was reconfigured such that the highway met the new freeway at an interchange at the south end of the park.

== Major intersections ==
The entire route is in Bethel Township, Clark County.

mi	km	Destinations	Notes
0.00	0.00	SR 4 – Dayton, Springfield	Southern terminus at four-ramp partial cloverleaf interchange
1.45	2.33	US 40 (National Road) / North Tecumseh Road	Northern terminus
1.000 mi = 1.609 km; 1.000 km = 0.621 mi
