= American Industrial Ballads =

Studio album by Pete Seeger
- Released: 1956
- Genre: Folk
- Length: 49:25
- Label: Folkways Records
- Producer: Moses Asch

Alternative Cover
- The 1992 reissue album cover.

American Industrial Ballads is a studio album by American folk singer Pete Seeger. It was released in 1956 by Folkways Records. It was reissued in 1992 by Smithsonian Folkways.

== Album ==
Seeger sings songs of struggle which emerged from the coal mines, textile mills and acres of farmland, and spoke of issues important to the American laborer. There are twenty-four songs, written about the unprecedented industrialization of the 19th century, including "Peg and Awl", "The Farmer is the Man", and "Winnsboro Cotton Mill Blues". Irwin Silber's notes provide a history of labor folk song and its role in American popular music. The cover design for the 1992 reissue was done by Carol Hardy.

== Critical reception ==
Professional ratings
Review scores
Source	Rating
AllMusic	4.5/5 stars

Writing for Allmusic William Ruhlman wrote "Seeger presents the songs straightforwardly with only occasional flourishes, intent on getting the meanings across." He continued, "Taken together, they chronicle a century and a half of the efforts of farmers, textile workers, and miners, primarily, to get what they deserve from increasingly rich and powerful captains of industry."

== Track listing ==
No.	Title	Lyrics	Music	Length
1.	"Peg and Awl"	Traditional	Traditional	2:29
2.	"The Blind Fiddler"	Traditional	Traditional	1:17
3.	"Buffalo Skinners"	Traditional	Traditional	2:44
4.	"Eight-Hour Day"	Traditional	Traditional	1:00
5.	"Hard Times in the Mill"	Traditional	Traditional	2:16
6.	"Roll Down the Line"	Traditional	Traditional	3:15
7.	"A Hayseed Like Me"	Traditional	Traditional	1:16
8.	"The Farmer is the Man (Who Feeds Us All)"	Traditional	Traditional	1:43
9.	"Come All You Hardy Miners"	Traditional	Traditional	2:00
10.	"He Lies in the American Land"	Andrew Kovaly	Andrew Kovaly	2:01
11.	"Casey Jones"	Traditional	Traditional	2:20
12.	"Let Them Wear Their Watches Fine"	Traditional	Traditional	3:41
13.	"Cotton Mill Colic"	Traditional	Traditional	1:41
14.	"Seven Cent Cotton and Forty Cent Meat"	Traditional	Traditional	1:58
15.	"Mill Mother's Lament"	Traditional	Traditional	1:37
16.	"Fare Ye Well, Old Ely Branch"	Traditional	Traditional	2:11
17.	"Beans, Bacon, and Gravy"	Traditional	Traditional	2:56
18.	"The Death of Harry Simms"	Traditional	Traditional	2:14
19.	"Winnsboro Cotton Mill Blues"	Traditional	Traditional	1:09
20.	"The Ballad of Barney Graham"	Traditional	Traditional	1:48
21.	"My Children are Seven in Number"	Eleanor Kellogg	Traditional	3:59
22.	"Raggedy"	John Handcox	A. P. Bland	2:32
23.	"Pittsburgh Town"	Woody Guthrie	Traditional	1:30
24.	"Sixty Percent"	Les Rice	Les Rice	1:00
