= California Woods Nature Preserve =

Municipal park in Cincinnati, Ohio

Coordinates: 39°4′36″N 84°25′7″W

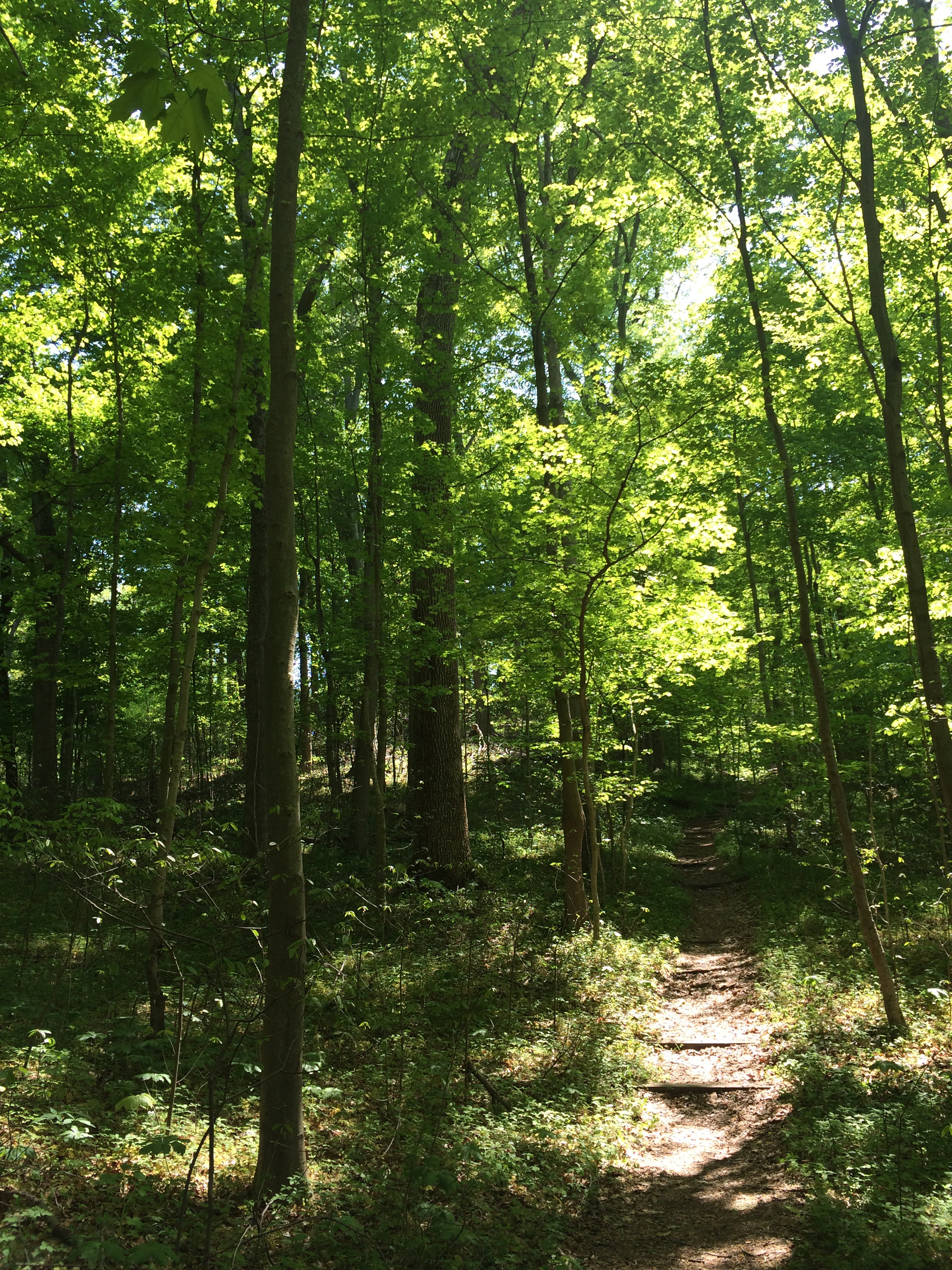
Image of trail steps at California Woods (Cincinnati, Ohio)

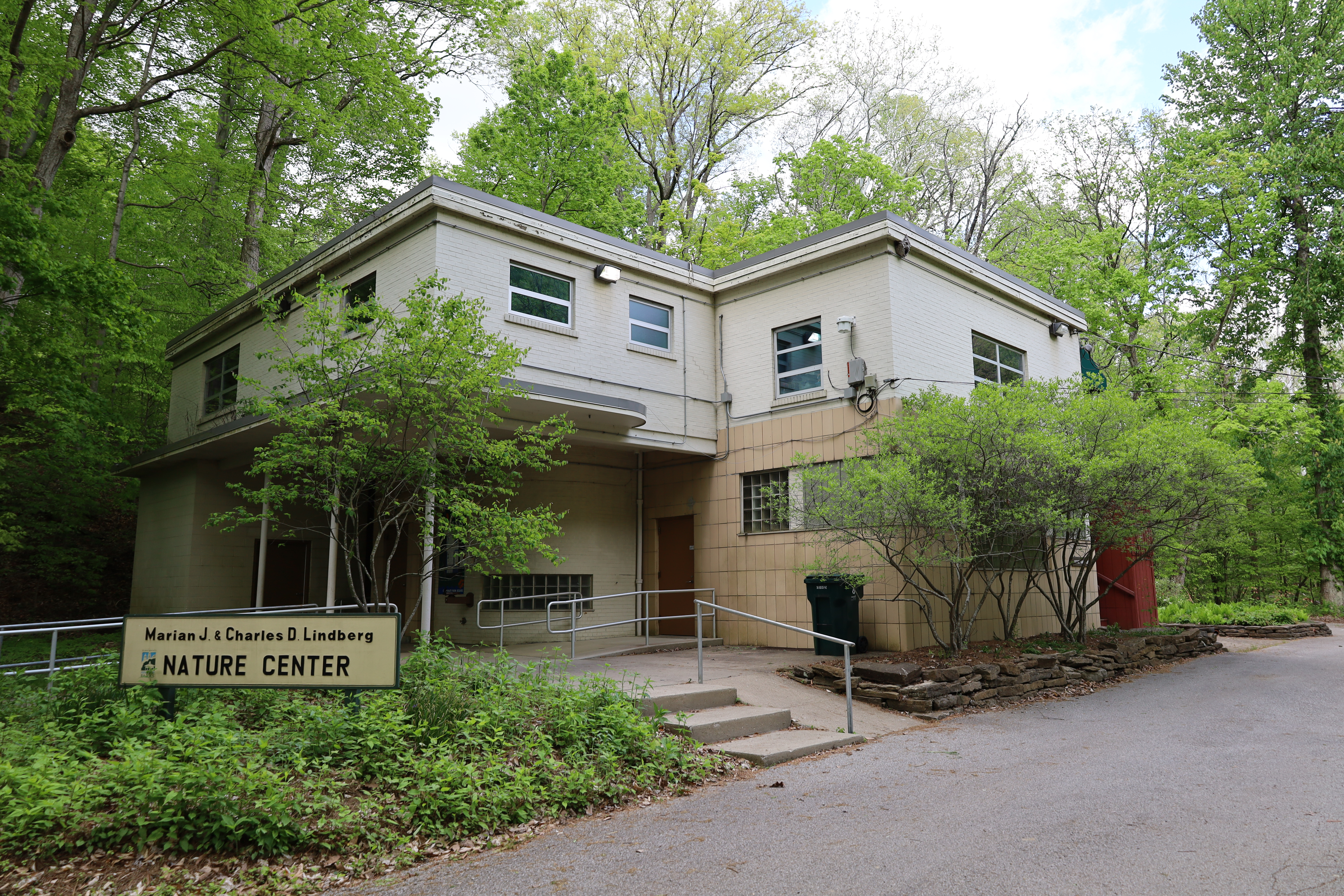
Lindburg Nature Center in California Woods in 2023

California Woods is a City of Cincinnati municipal park situated in the neighborhood of California. The park consists of 151 acres of forest and has over 50 species of trees. The park is mostly wooded with hiking trails. It has one small building functioning as a nature center, primarily for school and other scheduled visitor groups. The building was constructed in 1938.
