= Eleven Cent Cotton and Forty Cent Meat =

Eleven Cent Cotton and Forty Cent Meat (sometimes Seven Cent Cotton and Forty Cent Meat, or other price combinations) is a traditional American song of the late 1920s, first published in 1928 by Bob Miller and Emma Dermer. The song details the economic situation as the Great Depression approached, when the price of cotton fell so low that farming became increasingly unviable economically and inflation had sent the prices of basic necessities skyrocketing.

== Recordings ==
Two time Grammy-winning Americana/country/bluegrass singer artist Jim Lauderdale provided a version of this song for Janet Reno's compilation of traditional American songs entitled Song of America.

American folk singer Pete Seeger recorded a version of this song, which was released on his 1956 album American Industrial Ballads.

David “Stringbean” Akeman recorded the song on his 1962 album Rare Old Time Banjo Pickin’ and Singin, under the title “20 Cent Cotton & 90 Cent Meat."

Grammy-winning Country Music Hall of Fame member Porter Wagoner recorded a version in 2007 on his final album Wagonmaster.

Michael Cleveland included the song on his 2019 album Tall Fiddler. Like David Akeman's version, the prices in the song have been increased to 20 cents for cotton and 90 cents for meat.
