= Metropolis of Pittsburgh =

Metropolis of Pittsburgh may refer to:

- Metropolis of Pittsburgh (Ruthenian Greek Catholic Church), an Eastern Catholic metropolitan territory sui juris
- Greek Orthodox Metropolis of Pittsburgh, an Eastern Orthodox ecclesiastical jurisdiction

== See also ==
- Metropolis (disambiguation)
- Pittsburgh (disambiguation)
