= Orators Mound =

Archaeological site in Ohio, United States

- U.S. National Register of Historic Places
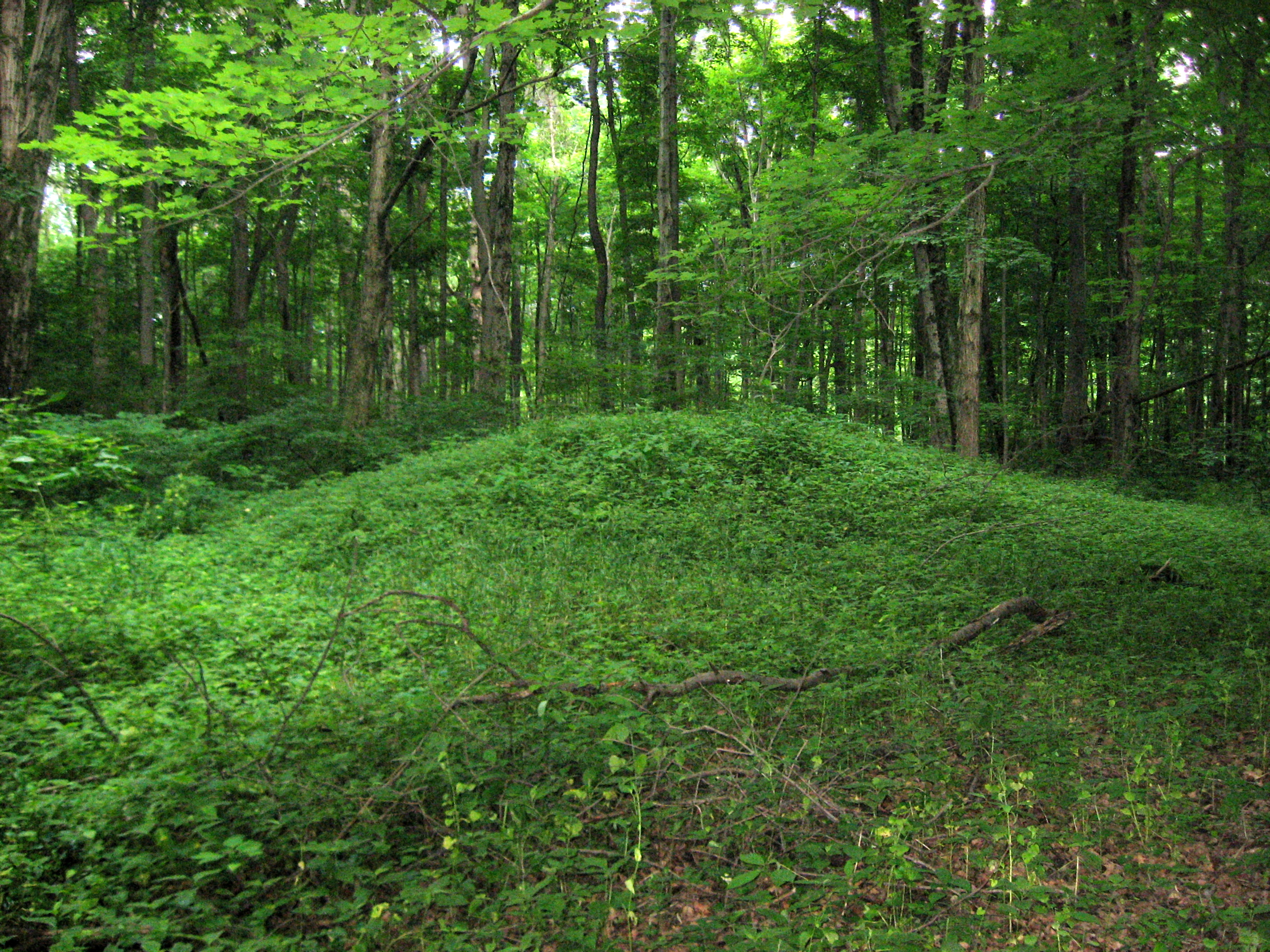
- View of the mound from a nearby trail

- Location within Ohio Location within the United States
- Location: Near Yellow Spring, east of the village of Yellow Springs, Ohio
- Coordinates: 39°48′16″N 83°52′55″W
- Area: 1 acre (0.40 ha)
- NRHP reference No.: 74001507
- Added to NRHP: July 15, 1974

The Orators Mound is a Native American mound in the western part of the U.S. state of Ohio. Although its cultural affiliation is disputed, it is an important archaeological site.

== Geographic context and early history ==
In 1908, forty-one different earthworks were known in Greene County. One of these is located atop the cliffs near a large natural spring called the "Yellow Spring", close to the village of Yellow Springs. Because of its location near the spring, it was plainly known throughout much of prehistory. During the 1840 election campaign, the mound served as an orator's platform for Daniel Webster and Henry Clay, who spoke before a great audience on the same summer afternoon. Until it was excavated in 1953, the mound was built of stone and measured 15 metres (49 ft) in diameter and 1.6 metres (5 ft 3 in) high, although its size may have grown since white settlement of the region, since locals are known to have added earth to the mound to resist erosion. Today, the mound is located within the Glen Helen Nature Preserve, a National Natural Landmark.

== Excavations ==
The earliest known excavation of the mound took place in 1953 and 1954, under the supervision of a man known as Frank Van Wort; little of this excavation is known, because Van Wort published no reports of his work nor wrote any surviving unpublished reports. It appeared that he tried to dig through the middle of the mound but missed slightly to the northern side. A more systematic excavation was conducted in 1971 by Antioch College students under the supervision of archaeologist Wolfgang Marschall; under his work, Van Wort's work was exposed, and approximately one-third of the entire mound was excavated. Their work revealed the presence of a burial chamber at the heart of the mound.

Archaeologists have failed to come to a conclusion on the archaeological culture that built the mound. Van Wort found five skeletons within the mound — two men and three infants — that he interpreted as being from the Adena culture, as well as Adena-style projectile points. Conversely, Marschall's team recovered detailed information about skeletons, grave goods, their relationships with each other, and the general stratigraphy of the mound, and their work concluded that the mound was produced by later Hopewellian peoples. Seven skeletons from this excavation, along with various artifacts and records of the excavation, were placed in the Dayton Museum of Natural History.

== Preservation ==
The mound's location within Glen Helen puts it in the bounds of a nature reserve and a National Natural Landmark. It was given further protection in 1974, at which time it was listed on the National Register of Historic Places; it is currently one of six archaeological sites on the Register in Greene County. The mound's continued preservation was threatened in 2008, as maintenance funding and labor was ended when Antioch College closed for lack of funds, but multiple grants obtained in 2010 included money for upgrading the trail by which the mound is accessed.
