= Mathers Mill, Ohio =

Unincorporated community in Ohio, U.S.

Coordinates: 39.4641°N 84.1006°W

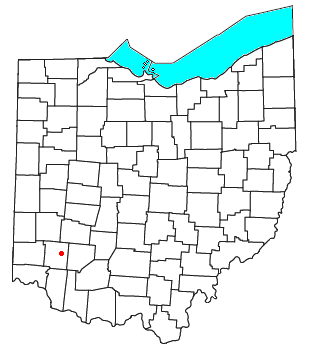
Location of Mathers Mill, Ohio

Mathers Mill, alternately called Mathers Mills or Mather's Mills, is an unincorporated community in Warren County, Ohio, United States. It is approximately five miles east of Lebanon, and two miles south of Oregonia in eastern Turtlecreek Township. The area is served by the Oregonia post office, and Lebanon phone exchange and school district. Wilmington Road crosses the Little Miami River and intersects Corwin Road in this area. The bridge is known as the Mathers Mill bridge and the steep hill up out of the valley is sometimes referred to as Mathers Mill Hill.

The area is named for a mill once owned by Richard Mather, which no longer exists. The settlement was a stop for the Little Miami Railroad. Mathers Mill is now a public access point with parking for the Little Miami Bike Trail, and canoe and fishing access point to the Little Miami River.
