= Pittsburg =

Pittsburg may refer to:

== Places ==
=== United States ===
Cities, towns, townships and counties

- Pittsburg, California
- Pittsburg, Florida
- Pittsburg, Kansas, Crawford County
- Pittsburg, New Hampshire
- Pittsburg, Oklahoma
- Pittsburg, Texas
- Pittsburg County, Oklahoma
- Pittsburg Township, Mitchell County, Kansas
- Former spelling of Pittsburgh, Pennsylvania
- South Pittsburg, Tennessee

Unincorporated communities, former towns, and other places

- Pittsburg, Alabama
- Pittsburg Point, Arizona, a village that predates and was absorbed by Lake Havasu City, Arizona
- Pittsburg, Arkansas
- Bay Point, California, until 1993 named West Pittsburg
- Pittsburg, Colorado
- Pittsburg, DeKalb County, Georgia
- Pittsburg, Walker County, Georgia
- Pittsburg, Fayette County, Illinois
- Pittsburg, Illinois, in Williamson County
- Pittsburg, Indiana, an unincorporated community
- Hymera, Indiana, originally named Pittsburg
- Pittsburg, Montgomery County, Iowa
- Pittsburg, Van Buren County, Iowa
- Pittsburg, Kentucky
- Pittsburg, Michigan
- Pittsburg, Mississippi
- Pittsburg, Missouri
- Pittsburg, Nebraska, a former town
- Pittsburg, Nevada, a ghost town
- Pittsburg, North Carolina
- Pitsburg, Ohio
- Pittsburg, Oregon
- Pittsburg, Lancaster County, Pennsylvania
- Pittsburg, South Carolina
- Pittsburg Landing, Tennessee
- Pittsburg Landing, Idaho
- West Pittsburg, Pennsylvania

=== Canada ===
- Pittsburg Island, Ontario, an island of Ontario

== Transportation ==
- Antioch–Pittsburg station, Antioch, California, United States
- Pittsburg/Bay Point station, Pittsburg, California
- Pittsburg Center station, Pittsburg, California
- West Pittsburg station, former train station and proposed museum in West Pittsburg, Pennsylvania

== Other uses ==
- Pittsburg (Hasidic dynasty) founded in Pittsburgh, PA, U.S.
- Pittsburg State University, a public university located in Pittsburg, Kansas

== See also ==
- West Pittsburg (disambiguation)
- Pittsboro (disambiguation)
- Pittsburgh, the city in Pennsylvania
- Pittsburgh (disambiguation)
