= Clifton Gorge State Nature Preserve =

State Nature Reserve in Ohio, US

Coordinates: 39.794°N 83.834°W

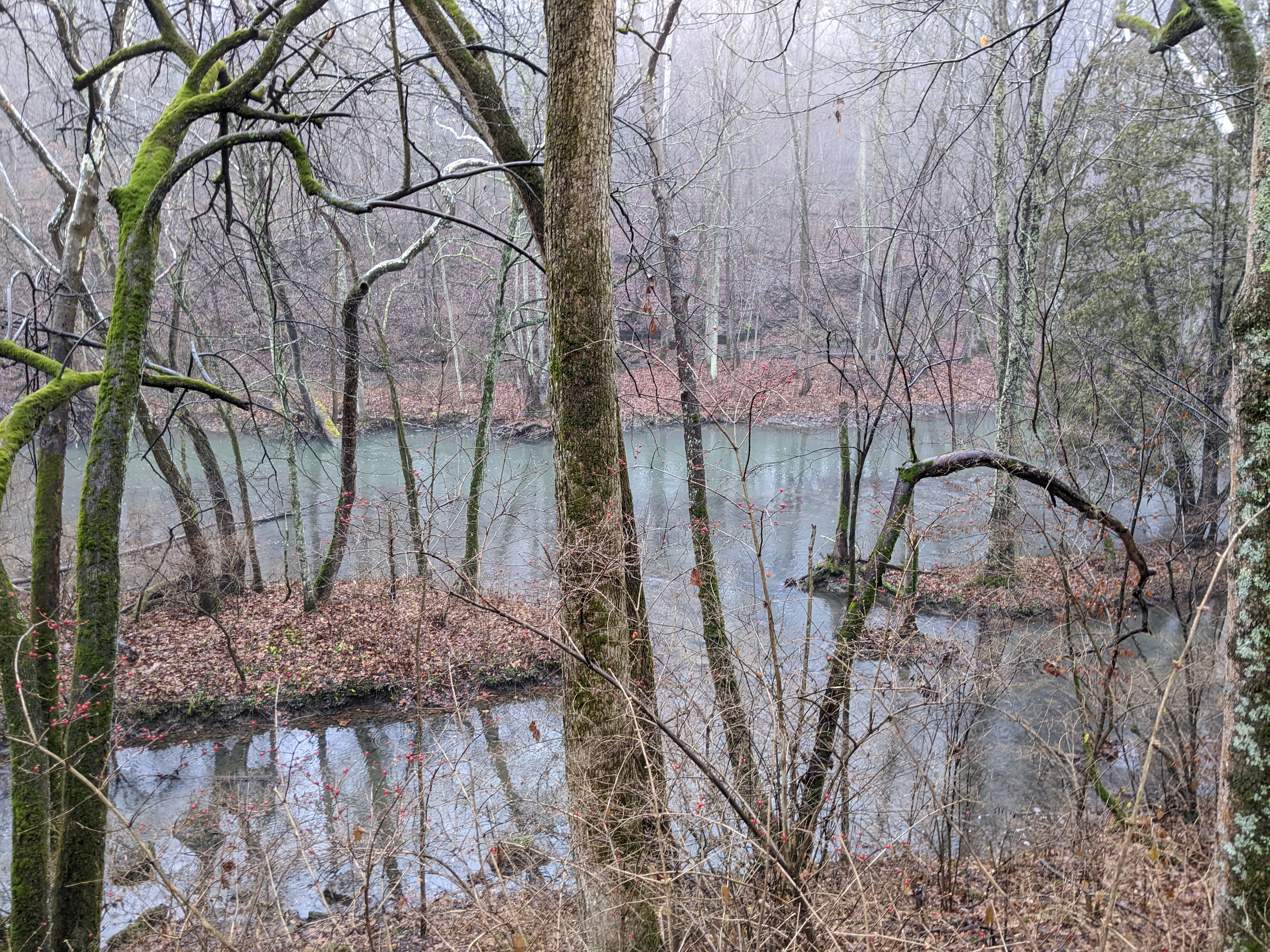
The Little Miami River passing through Clifton Gorge State Nature Preserve on December 18, 2021

Clifton Gorge State Nature Preserve, in Greene County, Ohio, is located three miles east of Yellow Springs, Ohio, and immediately southwest of Clifton, Ohio. The preserve constitutes 268 acres of gorges along two miles of the Little Miami River.

== History ==
Geologically, the canyon was cut into dolomite and shale bedrock dating to the Silurian Period some 400 million years ago. It was created by meltwater from glaciers about 15,000 years ago. The Little Miami River rushing through the narrow canyon created a water power source in the nineteenth century for grist mills, cotton mills, paper factories, and breweries. But by the late 1800s, most of the industrial activity ended when water power ceased to be an economical source of energy. Eight acres of the area was declared a National Natural Landmark in 1967, and the upper gorge became a state nature preserve in 1973.

== Facilities ==
The preserve has a Nature Center, and three miles of trails for hiking and biking. It also adjoins the 752-acre John Bryan State Park, which offers additional trails as well as boating, fishing, camping, and other amenities. That park, in turn, adjoins the 1,147 acre Glen Helen Nature Preserve, which has its own 15-mile network of footpaths, and which includes the famous Yellow Spring that gave the nearby town its name.

In June 2025, Governor Mike and First Lady Fran DeWine opened an exploration center, the first of its kind in an Ohio state nature preserve. The center features four aquariums with native fish and turtles, mussels from the Little Miami River with an interactive display, and exhibits on human history like former area mills. The center also includes a replica of a slump block cave.
