= Pittsburgh station =

Pittsburgh station may refer to several stations in Pittsburgh, Pennsylvania:

- Union Station (Pittsburgh) or Penn Station (opened 1903), currently the only operating intercity train station in Pittsburgh

== Former stations ==
- Baltimore and Ohio Station (Pittsburgh) (1887–1955), currently occupied by Interstate 376 and the Smithfield Street Bridge
- Grant Street Station or B&O Pittsburgh Terminal (1957–1989), site now occupied by PNC and First Avenue station (PAAC)
- Pittsburgh & Lake Erie Railroad Station (opened 1898), now a restaurant in Station Square
- Wabash Pittsburgh Terminal (1904–1946), site now occupied by Gateway Center (Pittsburgh)

== See also ==
- Pittsburg (disambiguation)#Transportation
