= Little Miami River =

River in the United States of America

Little Miami National Scenic River
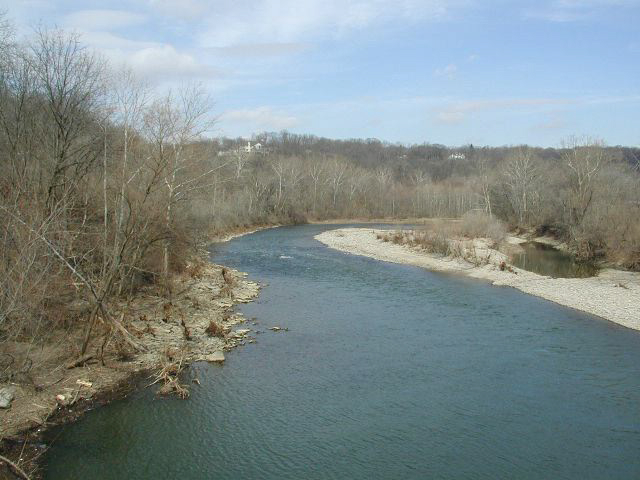
- Little Miami River at Milford, Ohio

Location
- Country: United States

Physical characteristics
- Source
  - coordinates: 39°49′39″N 83°34′36″W; S of Plattsburgh; Clark County, Ohio
  - elevation: 1,151 ft (351 m)
- Mouth
  - coordinates: 39°04′41″N 84°25′59″W with the Ohio River at California, Cincinnati; Hamilton County, Ohio
  - elevation: 446 ft (136 m)
- Length: 111 mi (179 km)
- Basin size: 1,757 mi^{2} (4,550 km^{2})
- Discharge
  - average: 1,280 cu ft/s (36 m^{3}/s)

National Wild and Scenic River
- Type: Scenic, Recreational
- Designated: August 20, 1973

The Little Miami River (Shawnee: Cakimiyamithiipi) is a Class I tributary of the Ohio River that flows 111 miles (179 km) through five counties in southwestern Ohio in the United States. The Little Miami joins the Ohio River east of Cincinnati. It forms parts of the borders between Hamilton and Clermont counties and between Hamilton and Warren counties. The Little Miami River is one of 156 American rivers designated by the U.S. Congress or the Secretary of the Interior as a National Wild and Scenic River and lends its name to the adjacent Little Miami Scenic Trail.

== Hydrography ==
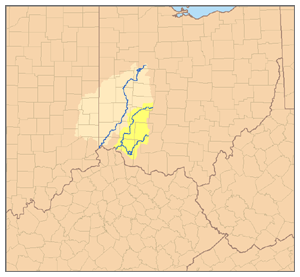
Watersheds of the Great Miami River (beige) and Little Miami River (yellow)

The Little Miami River is a tributary of the Ohio River. It is part of a watershed that drains a 1,757 square miles (4,550 km^{2}) area in 11 southwestern Ohio counties: Clark, Montgomery, Madison, Greene, Warren, Butler, Clinton, Clermont, Brown, Hamilton, and Highland. The river discharges on average 1,737 cubic feet per second (49.2 m^{3}/s) into the Ohio River. An average of 1,280 cubic feet per second (36 m^{3}/s) flow through the river proper; after heavy rains, the river flow may rise to 84,100 cubic feet per second (2,380 m^{3}/s).

Tributaries of the Little Miami include Beaver Creek, Sugar Creek, the East Fork Little Miami, North Fork, Todd's Fork, Duck Creek, Caesar Creek, Massie Creek, and Turtle Creek. Yellow Springs Creek, fed in part by its tributary Birch Creek, join the Little Miami within the boundary of the Glen Helen Nature Preserve. The river's main tributary, the East Fork of the Little Miami, was dammed in 1977 by the United States Army Corps of Engineers to create Harsha Lake, located in East Fork State Park. Similarly, in 1973, the Army Corps dammed Caesar Creek to create Caesar Creek Lake, located in Caesar Creek State Park.

The river's headwaters, considered part of the North Fork, are located about 5 miles (8.0 km) from South Charleston in Clark County, near Plattsburgh. The river empties into the Ohio River at California, a neighborhood of Cincinnati in Hamilton County. Between the headwaters and the mouth, there is a 705-foot (215 m) decrease in elevation.

== History ==
The Little Miami River is named for the Miami, an Algonquian-speaking Native American people who lived in the region during the early days of white settlement. Historically, the river formed the eastern boundary of the Symmes Purchase and the western boundary of the Virginia Military District.

In 1967 The Ohio University Development Planning Institute (Athens, Ohio) published "The Little Miami of Ohio; A Study of a Wild and Scenic River". This 56-page booklet, illustrated with maps and black and white photographs, first presented the idea of a corridor of parks and natural areas along the river.

In June 1967 Dayton newspaper editor Glenn Thompson would bring together educator Arthur Morgan, business leader Charles Sawyer, and outdoor enthusiast Corwin Fred to form Little Miami Incorporated, dedicated to the preservation of the Little Miami River. Mr. Thompson was the editor of the Dayton Journal-Herald in the late 1950s, and a strong advocate for the preservation of green space in the Miami Valley. The members of the newly formed Little Miami Incorporated would convince Ohio Congressman Clarence Brown to ask for inclusion of the Little Miami in the final list of 27 rivers to be studied for a proposed Scenic Rivers Bill.

The 1968 Wild and Scenic River Act designated portions of the Little Miami National Scenic River as Ohio's first National Wild and Scenic River. On April 23 of following year, the Little Miami State Scenic River from Milford to the headwaters became Ohio's first State Scenic River, due to legislation that predated the national act by a few months. The remainder of the river was added to the State Scenic River in 1971.

Hydropower of the Little Miami River was developed into the largest privately owned ammunition manufacturing center between New England and the Mississippi River. Company towns for the Miami Powder Company and Peters Cartridge Company were built at Goes Station and Kings Mills, respectively. The portion of Peters Cartridge Company factory on the opposite side of the river from Kings Mills in Hamilton Township, which closed in 1944 and is now owned by DuPont, was declared a Superfund site in 1996. Since then, studies by the Ohio Environmental Protection Agency have established that the site no longer poses an environmental hazard to the nearby river. Even so, the site was listed as a Superfund National Priorities List (NPL) site by the Environmental Protection Agency in April 2012 for copper, lead and mercury soil contamination. In September 2018, 15 acres of the 71-acre site was removed for the NPL after successful cleanup goals were achieved.

== Ecology ==
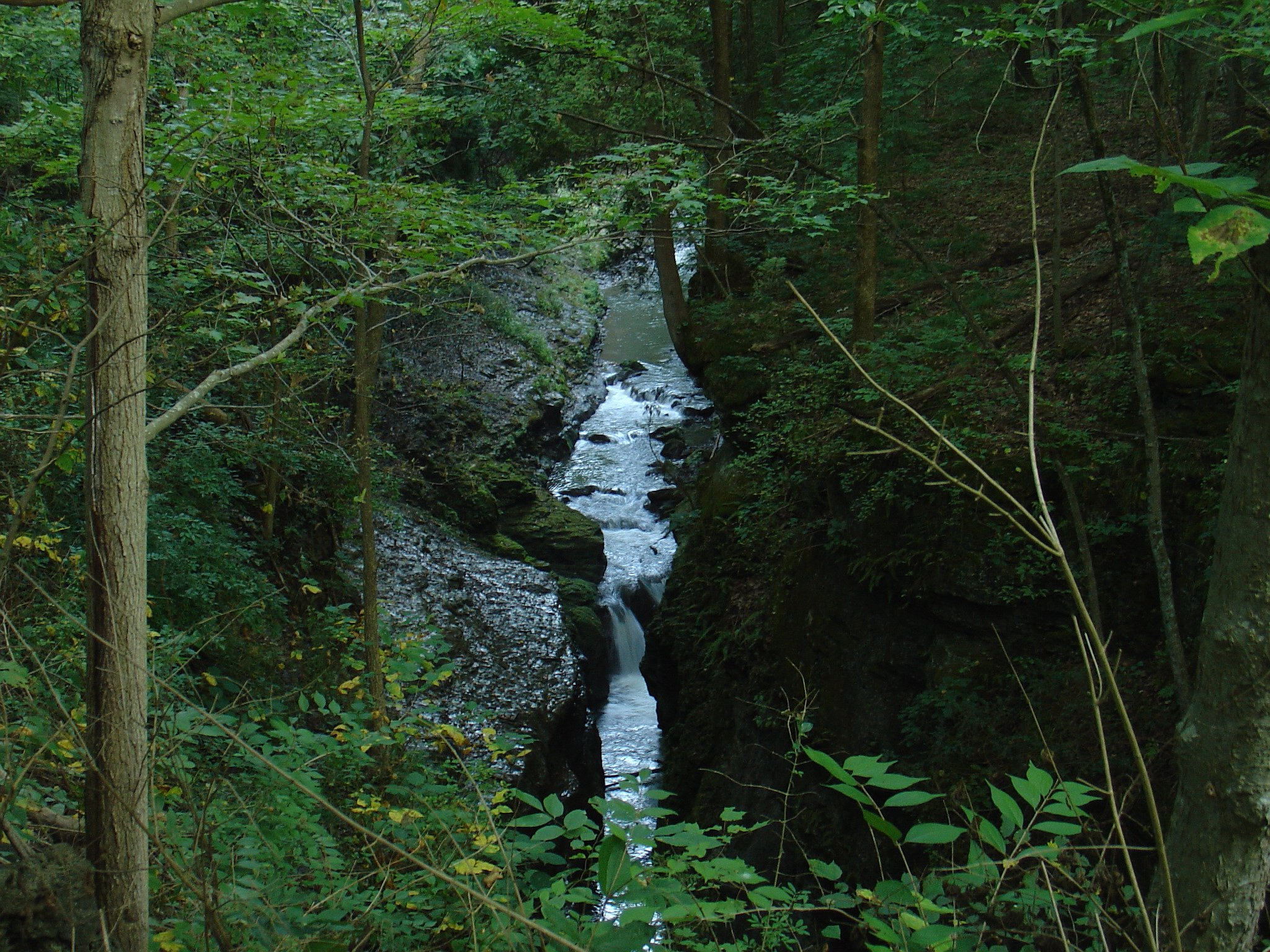
The Little Miami River passing through Clifton Gorge in John Bryan State Park, Greene County

The Little Miami River is home to at least 87 species of fish, as well as many species of turtles, frogs, water snakes, birds, mammals and invertebrates. The river contains 36 species of mussels, including two threatened species, one of which is endangered. Ohio considers five of the species to be endangered. Recently, zebra mussels and Asiatic clams have crowded out native species.

The river is protected by a number of nature preserves owned by Little Miami Inc., as well as by state and local parks (see below).

== Recreation ==
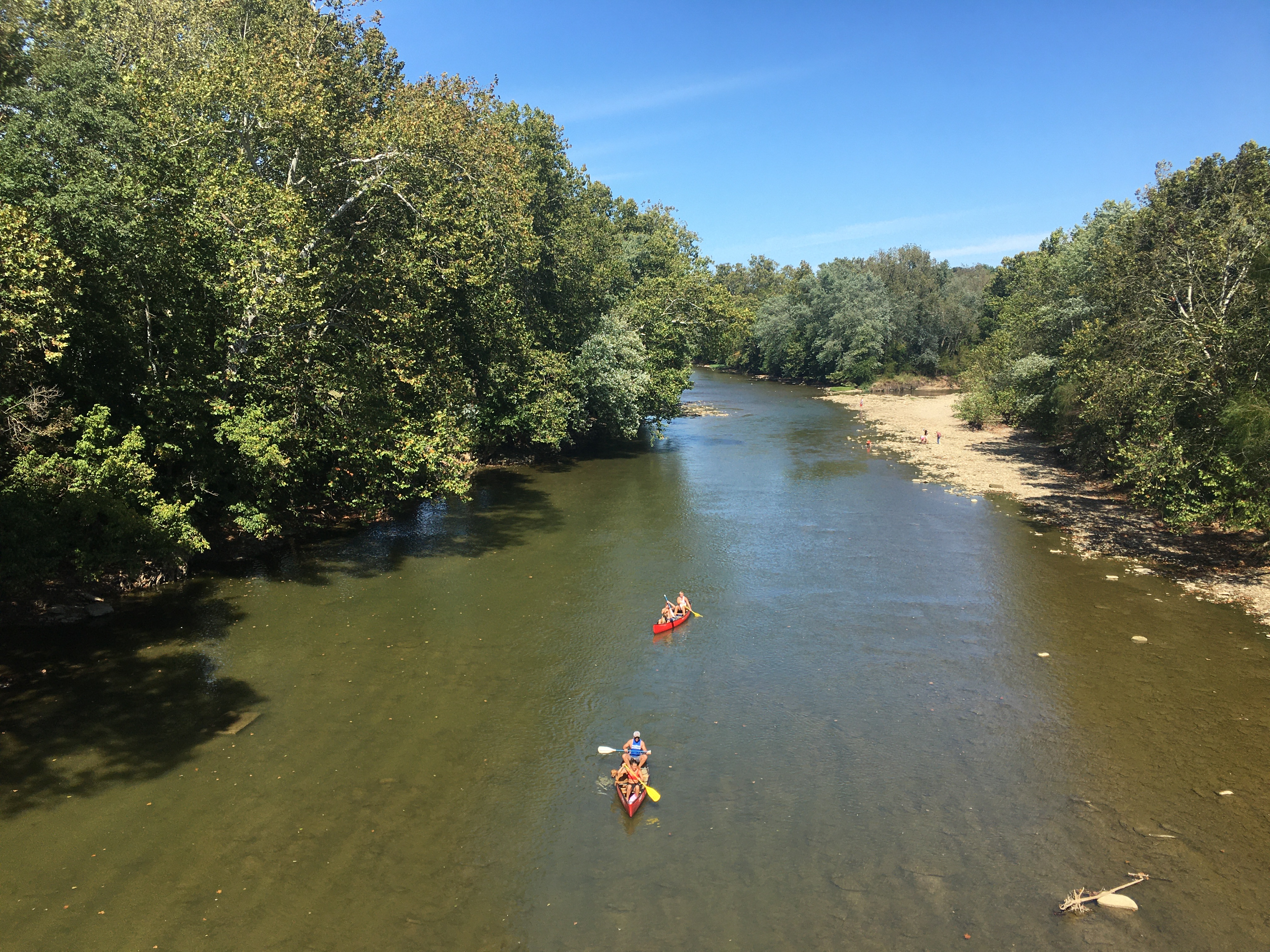
The Little Miami River near downtown Loveland, Ohio.

The Little Miami River is a National Scenic River. A series of state and county parks and bike trails have been built along the river, primarily the Little Miami Scenic Trail, which is concurrent with the Buckeye Trail and Little Miami Scenic State Park. Most of these trails have been built along the abandoned rail grades that run along the river (see Rail trail). The Ohio to Erie Trail project, under construction, aims to link these trails to other trails statewide to create a single bike trail from Lake Erie to the Ohio River.

The Little Miami is also popular among canoers and anglers. There are several canoe liveries along its course and the smallmouth bass fishing in the river is among the best in the state. For a river its size and considering that it drains mainly agricultural land, the water quality of the Little Miami River is excellent. Visitors may see a variety of wildlife including several varieties of turtles, mallards, and other ducks, Canada geese and blue herons.

== Places and point of interest ==
The following places, towns, and points of interest are located on the Little Miami starting at the headwaters in Clark County and proceeding down the river to its mouth on the Ohio River.

- Clark County – Headwaters of river
- Greene County, Ohio
  - Clifton and Clifton Mill
  - John Bryan State Park and Clifton Gorge State Nature Preserve
  - Yellow Springs and Glen Helen Nature Preserve
  - Beavercreek Township
  - Sugarcreek Township
  - Bellbrook
  - Spring Valley
- Warren County
  - Waynesville
  - Corwin
  - Caesar Creek Gorge – mouth of Caesar Creak leading to Caesar Creek Gorge and Lake.
  - Oregonia
  - Mathers Mill – canoe livery, public access
  - Jeremiah Morrow Bridge – Interstate 71 bridge crossing over the river valley
  - Fort Ancient – canoe livery, public access
  - Morrow – canoe livery, mouth of Todds Fork tributary
  - South Lebanon
  - Kings Mills – historic Peters Cartridge factory
  - Mason – theme park Kings Island
  - Fosters – historic settlement & public access
- Clermont County east side of river, Hamilton County west side of river
  - Chateau LaRoche Museum, also known as Loveland Castle (Hamilton County)
  - Loveland – canoe livery (Hamilton and Clermont County)
  - Lake Isabella, Ohio – (Hamilton County Park)
  - Milford – (Clermont County)
- Hamilton County
  - Terrace Park
  - Mariemont
  - Cincinnati
  - Lunken Field – Cincinnati Municipal Airport is along the bank of the river
  - Ohio River – mouth of the Little Miami River

== See also ==
- Great Miami River
- List of rivers of Ohio
- Little Miami Railroad
- Little Miami Scenic Trail
