= Pittsburgh Pirates (disambiguation) =

The Pittsburgh Pirates are a Major League Baseball team.

Pittsburgh Pirates may also refer to:

- Pittsburgh Pirates (NBL), a professional basketball team 1937–1945
- Pittsburgh Pirates (NHL), a professional ice hockey team 1925–1930
- Pittsburgh Pirates (WPHL), a professional ice hockey team 1907–1908
- Pittsburgh Steelers, a professional American football team, known as the Pirates 1933–1940

Pittsburg Pirates may refer to:

- Pittsburg Pirates (minor league), an early-20th century minor league baseball team from Pittsburg, Kansas
- Pittsburg High School (California)
- Pittsburg High School (Texas)
