= Judith Edelman =

American architect

- Born: Judith Hochberg; September 23, 1923; Brooklyn, New York
- Died: October 4, 2014 (aged 91)
- Education: Connecticut College; New York University; Columbia University
- Occupation: Architect
- Spouse: Harold Edelman
- Practice: Huson Jackson; Edelman Sultan Knox Wood/Architects
- Projects: Phelps House; 9G Cooperative Apartments

Judith Deena Edelman (September 23, 1923 – October 4, 2014) was an American architect. She designed a variety of projects in New York with her firm Edelman Sultan Knox Wood/Architects. A feminist, she was an advocate for the advancement of women in architecture and led the American Institute of Architects' first task force on women.

== Early life ==
Edelman was born Judith Hochberg in Brooklyn in 1923. Her parents were migrants from Eastern Europe. She was interested in architecture from a young age after visiting an architectural office as a high school student. She attended Connecticut College, New York University and Columbia University, finishing her Bachelor of Architecture at Columbia in 1946.

== Career ==
During Edelman's time in Columbia University, her class had several women (due to World War II) who were never given respect to by the architecture professors. Her and a few classmates were not content with the curriculum, and succeeding spoke up for it to be more challenging. After graduating from Columbia, Edelman struggled to find work and was told by numerous employers that they would not hire women. She worked briefly designing mental hospitals before she was hired by the Greenwich Village-based architect Huson Jackson. In 1960, she co-founded Edelman and Salzman Architects (later known as Edelman Sultan Knox Wood/Architects) with her husband, Harold Edelman, and Stanley Salzman.

Edelman was a frequent campaigner for the advancement of women architects and insisted that women should become involved in the American Institute of Architects (AIA) although it was "an exclusive gentleman's club". She was the first woman to be elected to the executive committee of the AIA's New York chapter in 1972. In 1972, she founded the Alliance of Women in Architecture, an organization to promote the advancement of women architects. The next year, she was a co-author of "Status of Women in the Architectural Profession", a resolution for the AIA that encouraged the institute to adapt to the "climate of change" brought about by the feminist movement of the time. At the AIA national convention in 1974, she gave a presentation about the fact that only 1.2 percent of American registered architects were women, claiming that the only industries with a smaller proportion of women were coal mining and steel work. After the presentation, she was recruited to lead the AIA's first task force on women, and came to be called "Dragon Lady" at AIA headquarters. She was the inspiration for Gloria and Esther Goldreich's 1974 children's book titled What Can She Be? An Architect.

With the firm she started, Edelman worked on a variety of projects in New York City, including many affordable housing projects. One such was Phelps House, a housing complex with a community center for the elderly, completed in 1983. In the 1960s she worked on a design to convert nine brownstone houses on the Upper West Side into a single building while preserving their facades; the building is now 9G Cooperative Apartments. Her designs won awards from the AIA, the Municipal Art Society and the City Club of New York, and she and her husband won the Andrew J. Thomas Pioneer in Housing award from the AIA's New York chapter in 1990.

== Personal life ==
She married Harold Edelman in 1947. They had two sons, Marc and Joshua and eight grandchildren. She died of a heart attack on October 4, 2014.
