= Pittsburgh Town =

Song performed by Pete Seeger

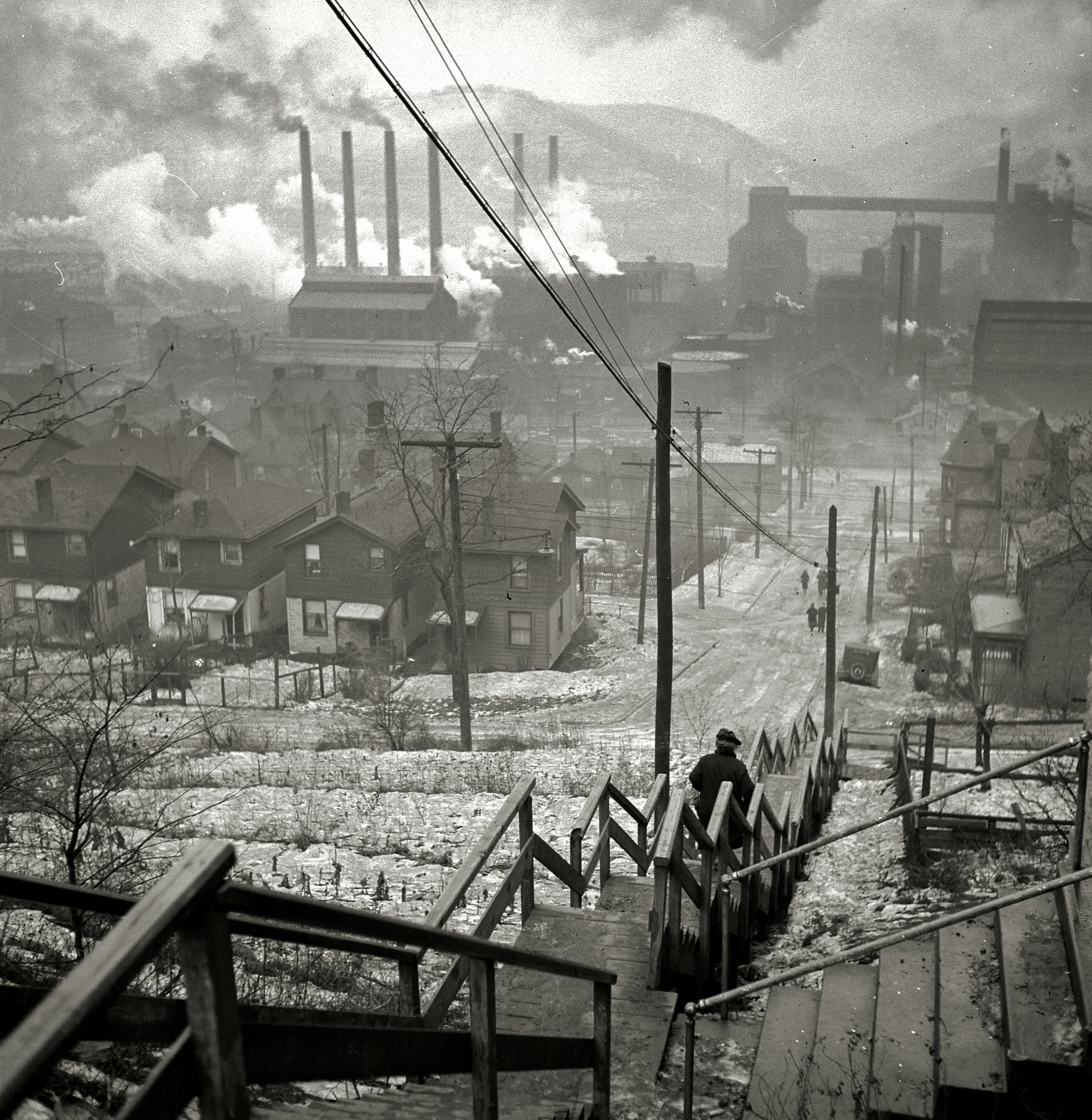
Pittsburgh's steel mills in 1940

"Pittsburgh Town", sometimes titled as "Pittsburgh" or "Pittsburgh is a Great Old Town", is a folk song written by Woody Guthrie to a traditional tune, and originally recorded by Pete Seeger. The song was written during a Pittsburgh, Pennsylvania stop on an Almanac Singers' tour; both Seeger and Guthrie were members of the band at this time. The song speaks of the labor and environmental problems that the city was facing in 1941, when the song was written. In the time since, environmental legislation has reduced the pollution problem that plagued Pittsburgh; because of this, the song's mentions of pollution in Pittsburgh have been sometimes been replaced with verses extolling the city.

== Creation ==
There are several stories behind the origin of the song. Several historians trace "Pittsburgh Town" to the Almanac Singers' 1941 national tour. According to the liner notes of Pete Seeger's American Industrial Ballads, originally released in 1956, on July 7, 1941, the group recorded fourteen songs for a small record label in New Jersey. The $250 that they were paid was used to purchase a 1932 Buick in which they traveled on their subsequent tour. While stopped in Pittsburgh, Pennsylvania, the group decided to play for steel workers who were in the process of unionizing. They played two nights of concerts in a steel patch, spending the night there in a cockroach-infested hotel. During the second concert, Woody Guthrie impulsively started to improvise lyrics to the tune of the folk song "Crawdad Hole". The song's entire body came out of this jam session. Millard Lampell continued improving and created the second verse of the song from that point.

The liner notes of Seeger's Songs of Struggle and Protest, 1930–50 tell a different story of the song's creation; they state that Guthrie wrote the song while airborne on a flight into Pittsburgh. While looking out the window at the smoky skies, he quickly jotted down the lyrics.

== Lyrics and themes ==
Pittsburgh town is a smoky ol' town
Solid iron from McKeesport down

The song's verses alternate between ones that speak of the environmental problems of Pittsburgh and ones that speak of its labor problems.

The first verse refers to Pittsburgh as a "smoky ol' town", and the third complains that the speaker does nothing more than "cough and choke" because of the steel industry's output. The smoke was an ever-present part of life in Pittsburgh at the time of the song's writing; steel mills on the banks of the city's three rivers made the sky glow red and continually released smoke. Modern environmentalist reviewers of the song believe that the pollution-oriented verses show that the song was written to protest the environmental conditions in which workers were forced to live.

The second and fourth verses focus on the labor disputes that the city was experiencing at the time. The second verse uses a pun on the name of Jones and Laughlin Steel to ask what the company stole from its workers ("What did Jones and Laughlin steal?"), while the fourth and final verse ends with the statement that all of the mill workers are "joining up with the CIO."

== Recordings and adaptations ==
The song has been covered by several artists and community groups. Pete Seeger Released a studio version on his 1956 album American Industrial Ballads and a live version of the song on his 1964 album Songs of Struggle and Protest, 1930–50. Both versions by Seeger feature him singing and playing the banjo without any additional accompaniment. In the live version, the crowd's clapping and singing along can be heard. Folk bands in the Pittsburgh area, such as the NewLanders, have both recorded and performed Seeger's version of the song.

Composer Paul Hindemith's Pittsburgh Symphony, written in 1958 for the 200th anniversary of the city's founding, quotes the melody of Pittsburgh Town, named "Pittsburgh Is a Great Old Town" by the composer, in the final movement. Gunther Schuller described the use of the tune in the symphony in his review as "the ultimate in paucity of imagination and tastelessness." However, Stephen Luttmann felt that Schuller's criticism misses the point of why Hindemith decided to include the motif.

In 1959, Vivien Richman released an adaptation of the song on her album Vivien Richman Sings Folk Songs of West Pennsylvania; her version of the song includes several additional verses about the landscape and geography of the region. The song has also been covered by students at Pittsburgh Public Schools, using verses that are less political than the original Guthrie composition and closer to the Richman version than the Seeger version. The change in verses was partly because by the middle of the 1950s, enforcement of the Smoke Control Ordinance of 1941 cleaned up the air. Lyrics about the smokiness of the town were replaced with the line "Pittsburgh Town is a Great Old Town."
