= Pittsburgh Maulers =

Pittsburgh Maulers may refer to:

- Pittsburgh Maulers (1984), United States Football League team
- Pittsburgh Maulers (2022), United States Football League team
