= Pittsboro =

Pittsboro may refer to a place in the United States:

- Pittsboro, Indiana
- Pittsboro, Mississippi
- Pittsboro, North Carolina
