= Pittsburgh Hardhats =

Pittsburgh Hardhats can refer to:

- Pittsburgh Hardhats (softball) - a defunct professional softball team
- Pittsburgh Hardhats (basketball) - a defunct professional basketball team
