= Pittsburgh Landmarks =

Pittsburgh landmarks can refer to either of two types of Pittsburgh landmark designations:

- City of Pittsburgh Designated Landmarks, a designation by the city government for properties within the city limits of Pittsburgh.
- Pittsburgh History & Landmarks Foundation (PHLF) Historic Landmarks, a historic plaque designation that encompasses all of Allegheny County, as well as surrounding counties, and is administered by a private foundation.

In addition, it may refer to:

- National Register of Historic Places listings in Pittsburgh, Pennsylvania
- National Register of Historic Places listings in Allegheny County, Pennsylvania
- List of Pennsylvania state historical markers in Allegheny County
