= David T. Littler =

American politician

David Talbot Littler (February 7, 1836–June 23, 1902) was an American lawyer and politician.

Littler was born in Clifton, Ohio. In 1857, he moved to Lincoln, Illinois and worked as a carpenter. He studied law and was admitted to the Illinois bar in 1860. He served as a justice of the peace and as a master-in-chancery. Littler also served as a collector of internal revenue for the United States government. In 1868, Littler moved to Springfield, Illinois and continued to practice law. Stephen T. Logan was his brother-in-law. Littler served in the Illinois House of Representatives from 1883 to 1885 and from 1887 to 1889. Littler then served in the Illinois Senate from 1895 to 1899. Littler was a Republican. Littler died in Springfield, Illinois, from a long illness.
