= John Bryan State Park =

Park in Ohio, United States

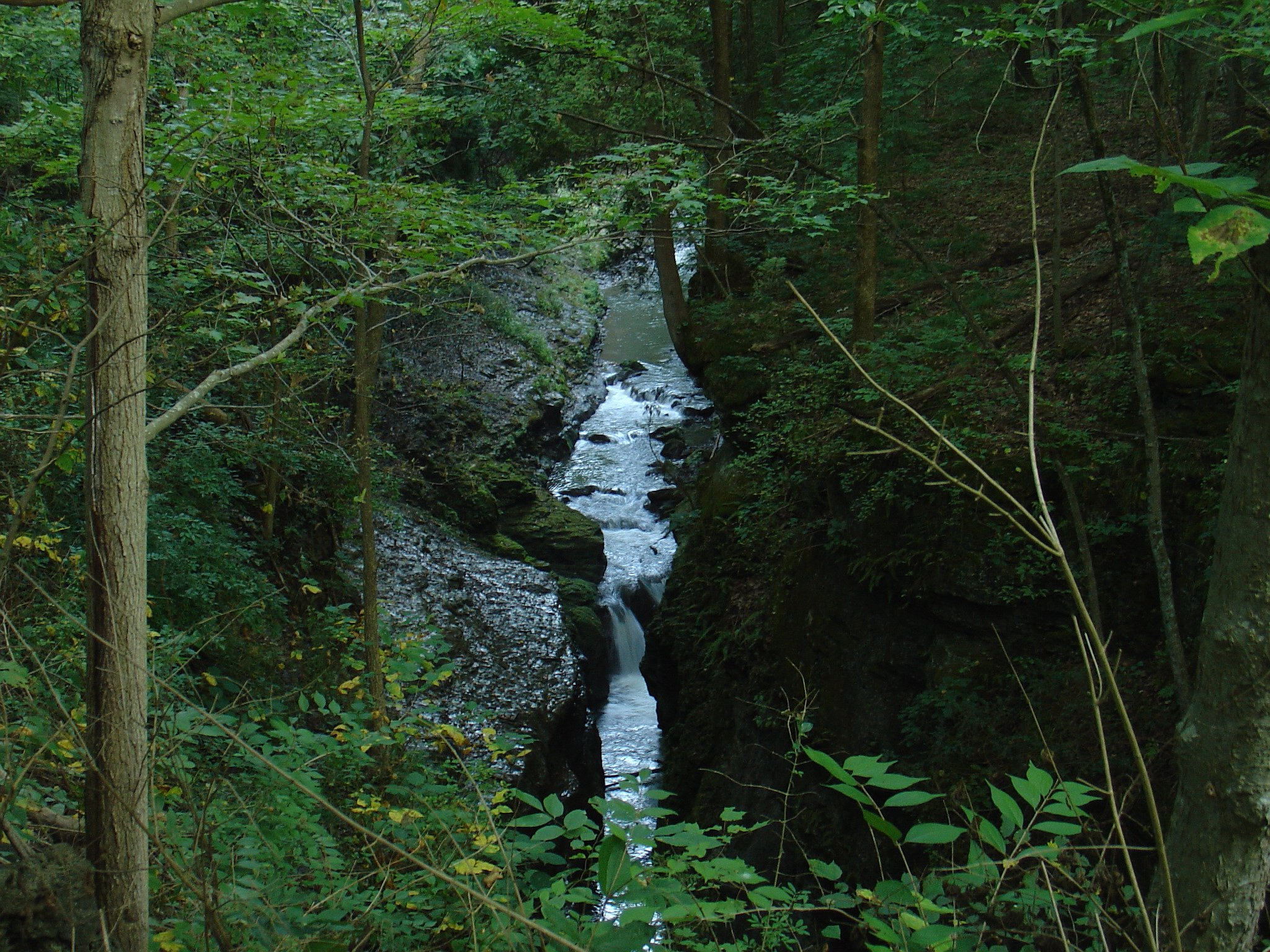
- Clifton Gorge at John Bryan State Park

- Location within Ohio Location within the United States
- Location: Greene County, Ohio, United States
- Coordinates: 39°47′28″N 83°51′16″W
- Area: 752 acres (304 ha)
- Elevation: 1,017 ft (310 m)
- Established: 1951
- Administrator: Ohio Department of Natural Resources
- Designation: Ohio state park
- Website: John Bryan State Park

John Bryan State Park, in Greene County, Ohio, is a 752-acre (304 ha) state park. It surrounds Clifton Gorge, a deep chasm of the Little Miami River, between Yellow Springs and Clifton. The park contains a campground, and hiking and biking trails. The park adjoins Clifton Gorge and Glen Helen nature preserves.

== History ==
The Cincinnati–Pittsburgh stagecoach road served the area, and several settlers established water-powered industries in the gorge. The town of Clifton prospered from the textile mill, gristmills, and sawmills there.

By the late 19th century, most of the industrial activity in the area had ceased. Water was no longer an economical source of power, and many mills were abandoned. One of the grist mills, the Clifton Mill, built in 1802 in the village of Clifton, is still in operation.

In 1896, John Bryan, a businessman, purchased 335 acres (136 ha) along the Clifton Gorge area and called the land "Riverside Farm". This part of the Little Miami River was a vital, economical source of power for the early settlers in the 19th century. In 1918, he bequeathed Riverside Farm to the state of Ohio, "to be cultivated by the state as a forestry, botanic and wildlife reserve park and experiment station", which would bear his name. In May 1925, John Bryan's land became one of the state's first forest parks. In 1949, John Bryan State Park was transferred to the newly created Division of Parks and Recreation, part of the Ohio Department of Natural Resources. John Bryan State Park and the adjoining Clifton Gorge State Nature Preserve overlook the Little Miami River gorge, which the United States Department of the Interior designated a National Natural Landmark.
