= Pittsburgh Phantoms =

PIttsburgh Phantoms may refer to:

- Pittsburgh Phantoms (NPSL) - a professional soccer team which played in 1967.
- Pittsburgh Phantoms (RHI) - a professional roller hockey team which played in 1994.
- Pittsburgh Phantoms (ABA) - a professional basketball team which played in 2009-10.
