= Pittsburgh Channel =

- Location in Southern Ontario
- Location: District Municipality of Muskoka, Ontario
- Coordinates: 45°00′22″N 79°56′16″W
- Part of: Lake Huron
- Primary inflows: Inner Bay
- Primary outflows: Moreaus Bay
- Basin countries: Canada
- Surface elevation: 176 m (577 ft)

The Pittsburgh Channel is strait in the municipality of Georgian Bay, District Municipality of Muskoka in Central Ontario, Canada. It is in the Great Lakes Basin and is part of the Go Home River inlet system off Georgian Bay on Lake Huron.

== Course ==
The channel provides an alternate route from the Go Home River mouth to Georgian Bay, instead of the more direct southwest route from Inner Bay through Go Home Bay and the Bushby Inlet to Outer Bay. Instead, the Pittsburgh Channel exits Inner Bay northwest and leads to Moreaus Bay, which in turn flows through North Go Home Bay to Outer Bay.
