= Pittsburgh Keystones =

The Pittsburgh Keystones may refer to:

- Pittsburgh Keystones (baseball) - Negro National League team of 1922
- Pittsburgh Keystones (ice hockey) - Western Pennsylvania Hockey League team of the turn of the 20th century
