= Pittsburg, Walker County, Georgia =

Unincorporated community in Georgia, U.S.

Coordinates: 34.85944°N 85.43333°W

Pittsburg, Georgia is a mostly deserted unincorporated community in Walker County, Georgia, United States. It should not be confused with the modern-day city of Pittsburg, DeKalb County, Georgia. The historic settlement of Pittsburg has a Latitude of 34.85944 and a Longitude of -85.43333. It was named after the industrial heritage of Pittsburgh, Pennsylvania.
