= Pittsburgh Historic District =

Pittsburgh Historic District may refer to:

- Pittsburgh Central Downtown Historic District, Pittsburgh, Pennsylvania, listed on the NRHP in Pennsylvania
- Pittsburgh Historic District (Atlanta, Georgia), listed on the NRHP in Fulton County, Georgia
