= Pittsburgh shooting =

Pittsburgh shooting may refer to:

- 2009 shooting of Pittsburgh police officers, in which three officers were killed
- 2018 Pittsburgh synagogue shooting, in which eleven people were killed
- 2023 Pittsburgh standoff and shooting

== See also ==
- Mass shootings in Pennsylvania
