= Clifton, Ohio =

- Village
- Street in Clifton

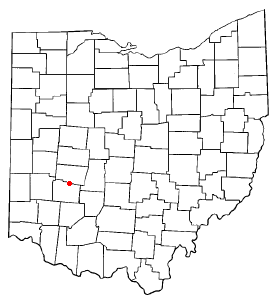
- Location of Clifton, Ohio

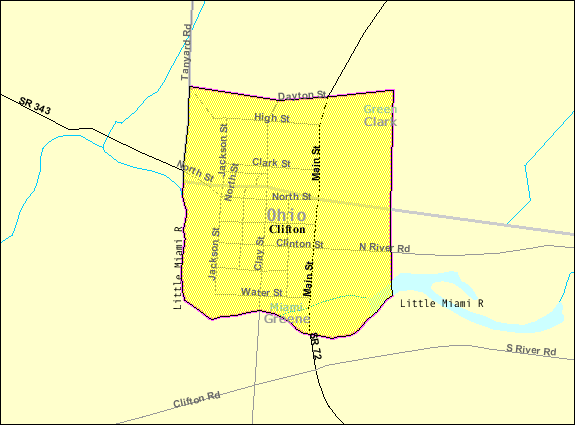
- Detailed map of Clifton
- Coordinates: 39°47′50″N 83°49′33″W
- Country: United States
- State: Ohio
- Counties: Greene, Clark

Area
  - Total: 0.17 sq mi (0.44 km^{2})
  - Land: 0.17 sq mi (0.44 km^{2})
  - Water: 0.0039 sq mi (0.01 km^{2})
- Elevation: 1,004 ft (306 m)

Population (2020)
  - Total: 131
  - Estimate (2023): 136
  - Density: 773.7/sq mi (298.74/km^{2})
- Time zone: UTC-5 (Eastern (EST))
  - Summer (DST): UTC-4 (EDT)
- ZIP code: 45316
- Area codes: 937, 326
- FIPS code: 39-16056
- GNIS feature ID: 2397648
- Website: https://villageofclifton.com/

Clifton is a village in Clark and Greene counties in the U.S. state of Ohio. The Greene County portion of Clifton is part of the Dayton Metropolitan Statistical Area, while the Clark County portion is part of the Springfield Metropolitan Statistical Area. The population was 131 at the 2020 census. The village is located about 24 miles east of central Dayton.

Clifton is home to the Clifton Mill Covered Bridge. The village is also home to the historic 1893 Clifton Opera House.

== History ==
As early as 1827, the area was referred to as Patterson's Mills. Clifton was platted in 1840, and named for the nearby cliffs on the Little Miami River. A post office called Clifton has been in operation since 1832.

== Geography ==
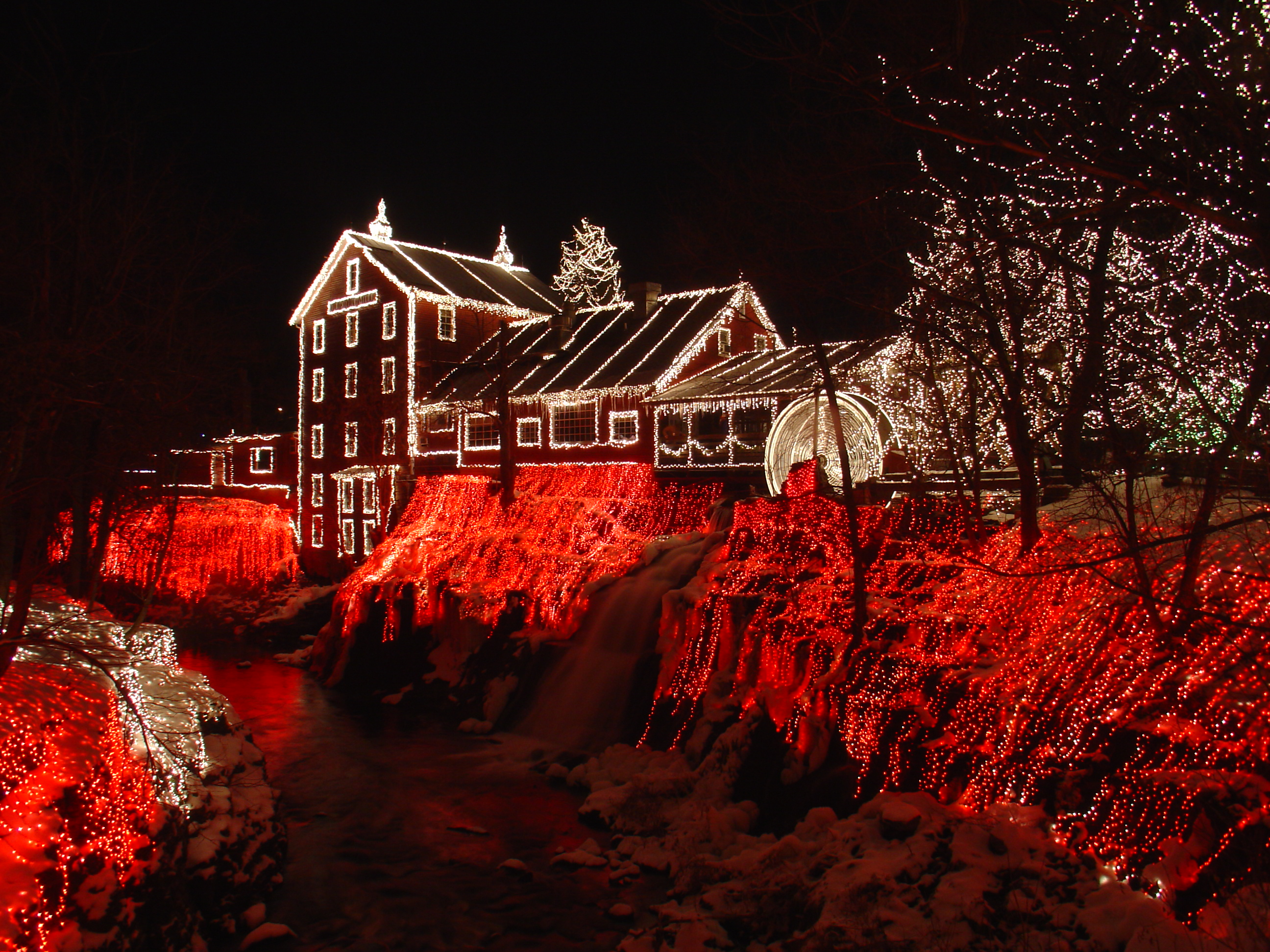
Clifton Mill is a popular draw at Christmas time

Clifton is the eastern terminus of Ohio State Route 343, and both the Little Miami River and the Clifton Gorge State Nature Preserve sit to the village's south and west.

According to the United States Census Bureau, the village has a total area of 0.19 square miles (0.49 km^{2}), of which, 0.18 square miles (0.47 km^{2}) is land and 0.01 square miles (0.03 km^{2}) is water.

== Demographics ==
Historical population
Census	Pop.	Note	%±
1850	258		—
1860	284		10.1%
1870	253		−10.9%
1880	310		22.5%
1890	270		−12.9%
1900	262		−3.0%
1910	239		−8.8%
1920	214		−10.5%
1930	190		−11.2%
1940	187		−1.6%
1950	220		17.6%
1960	230		4.5%
1970	216		−6.1%
1980	182		−15.7%
1990	165		−9.3%
2000	179		8.5%
2010	152		−15.1%
2020	131		−13.8%
2023 (est.)	136	▲	3.8%
U.S. Decennial Census

=== 2010 census ===
As of the census of 2010, there were 152 people, 64 households, and 39 families living in the village. The population density was 844.4 inhabitants per square mile (326.0/km^{2}). There were 80 housing units at an average density of 444.4 per square mile (171.6/km^{2}). The racial makeup of the village was 92.1% White, 2.6% African American, 1.3% Asian, and 3.9% from two or more races. Hispanic or Latino of any race were 3.9% of the population.

There were 64 households, of which 26.6% had children under the age of 18 living with them, 43.8% were married couples living together, 6.3% had a female householder with no husband present, 10.9% had a male householder with no wife present, and 39.1% were non-families. 34.4% of all households were made up of individuals, and 9.4% had someone living alone who was 65 years of age or older. The average household size was 2.38 and the average family size was 3.05.

The median age in the village was 45.5 years. 22.4% of residents were under the age of 18; 7.1% were between the ages of 18 and 24; 19% were from 25 to 44; 37.6% were from 45 to 64; and 13.8% were 65 years of age or older. The gender makeup of the village was 46.1% male and 53.9% female.

=== 2000 census ===
As of the census of 2000, there were 179 people, 71 households, and 51 families living in the village. The population density was 1,011.8 inhabitants per square mile (390.7/km^{2}). There were 80 housing units at an average density of 452.2 per square mile (174.6/km^{2}). The racial makeup of the village was 88.83% White, 1.68% African American, 1.12% Native American, and 8.38% from two or more races.

There were 71 households, out of which 29.6% had children under the age of 18 living with them, 56.3% were married couples living together, 11.3% had a female householder with no husband present, and 26.8% were non-families. 25.4% of all households were made up of individuals, and 7.0% had someone living alone who was 65 years of age or older. The average household size was 2.52 and the average family size was 2.96.

In the village, the population was spread out, with 26.8% under the age of 18, 4.5% from 18 to 24, 24.0% from 25 to 44, 26.3% from 45 to 64, and 18.4% who were 65 years of age or older. The median age was 42 years. For every 100 females there were 101.1 males. For every 100 females age 18 and over, there were 111.3 males.

The median income for a household in the village was $42,679, and the median income for a family was $43,750. Males had a median income of $43,750 versus $33,125 for females. The per capita income for the village was $24,073. About 7.1% of families and 5.4% of the population were below the poverty line, including 12.8% of those under the age of eighteen and none of those 65 or over.

== Notable people ==
- Isaac K. Funk, cofounder of Funk & Wagnalls
- Woody Hayes, American football coach, College Football Hall of Fame inductee
- David T. Littler, lawyer, Illinois state legislator
