= Plattsburgh, Ohio =

Unincorporated community in Ohio, U.S.

Coordinates: 39°53′46″N 83°36′42″W

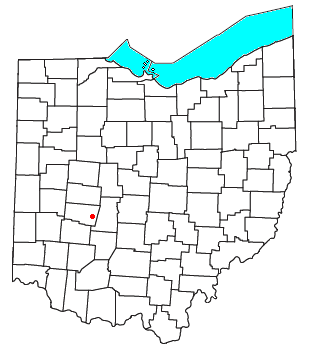
Location of Plattsburgh, Ohio

Plattsburgh (also spelled "Plattsburg") is an unincorporated community in central Harmony Township, Clark County, Ohio, United States. It is located along State Route 54 near the headwaters of the North Fork Little Miami River.

Plattsburgh is part of the Springfield, Ohio Metropolitan Statistical Area.

== History ==
Plattsburgh was platted in 1852. A post office was established at Plattsburgh in 1867, and remained in operation until 1968.
