= West Pittsburg =

West Pittsburg may refer to:

- West Pittsburg, former name of Bay Point, California
- West Pittsburg, Pennsylvania
  - West Pittsburg station
