= Pittsburg, DeKalb County, Georgia =

Unincorporated community in Georgia, U.S.

Coordinates: 33°52′50″N 84°13′10″W

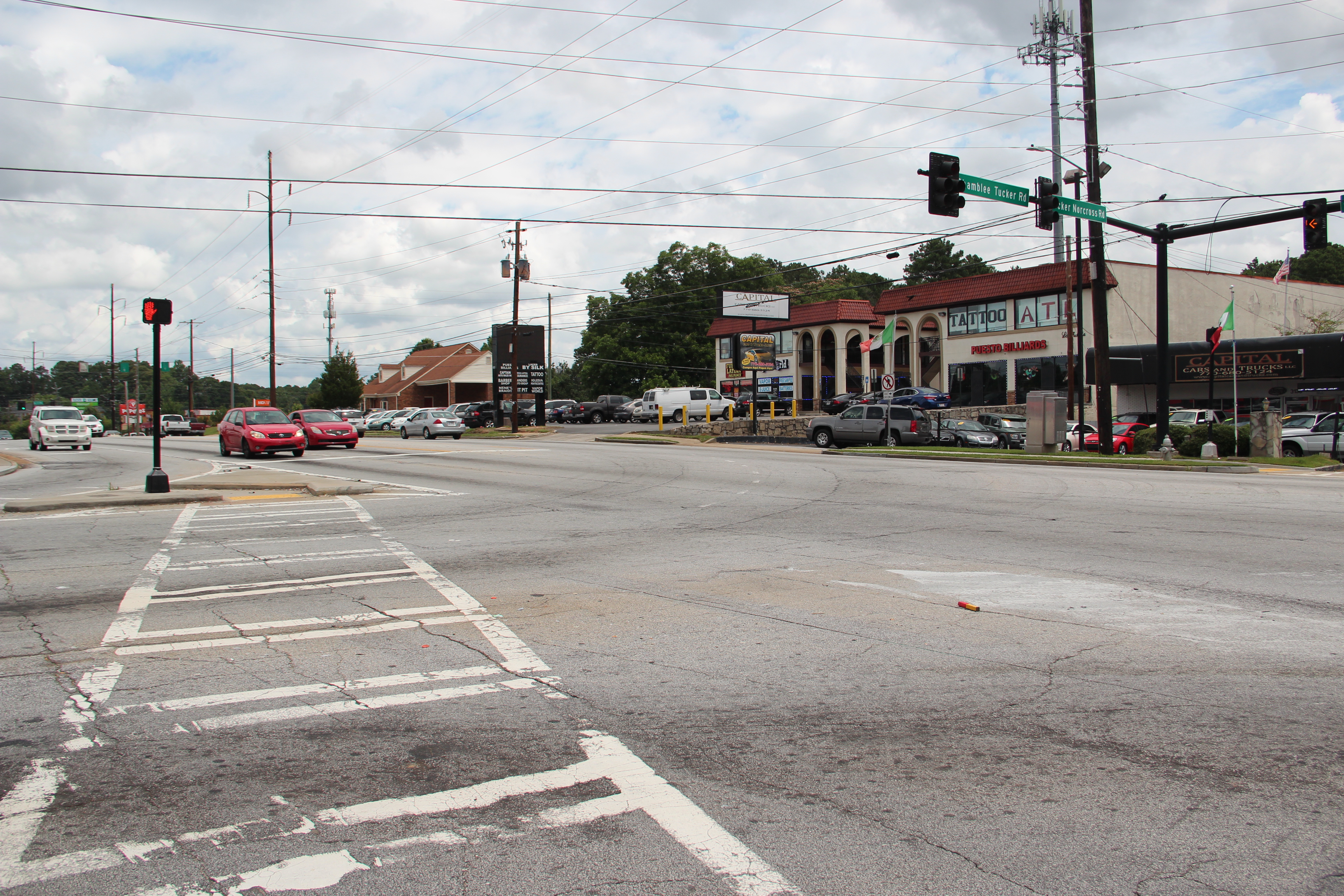
An intersection in Pittsburg

Pittsburg is an unincorporated community in DeKalb County, Georgia, United States. It was named after Newton J. Pitts, the original owner of a small, concrete block country store at the intersection of Tucker-Norcross Road and Chamblee-Tucker Road, now known as the community of Pittsburg. It has a latitude of 33.88056 and a longitude of -84.21944, with an elevation of 1,060 feet (320 m). It also is on the Eastern Continental Divide, between the Atlantic Ocean, and the Gulf Of Mexico. The Divide takes a turn north here, towards Norcross GA.
