= List of company towns in the United States =

This is a list of company towns in the United States.

Towns listed in bold are still considered company towns today; other entries are former company towns. See the Category:Company towns in the United States for an unannotated list of articles.

== Listed by state ==
=== Alabama ===
- Acipco, Alabama, formerly owned by American Cast Iron Pipe Company
- Aldrich, Alabama, formerly owned by Montevallo Coal Mining Company
- Bayview, Alabama, formerly owned by Tennessee Coal, Iron and Railroad Co.
- Bemiston, Alabama, formerly owned by the Bemis Brothers Bag Company
- Chickasaw, Alabama, formerly owned by Gulf Shipbuilding Corporation
- Docena, Alabama, formerly owned by Tennessee Coal, Iron and Railroad Co.
- Edgewater, Alabama, formerly owned by Tennessee Coal, Iron and Railroad Co.
- Fairfield, Alabama, (1910) originally "Corey", formerly owned by Tennessee Coal, Iron and Railroad Co.
- Kaulton, Alabama, owned by Kaul Lumber Co.
- Margaret, Alabama established by Alabama Fuel and Iron Company
- West Blocton, Alabama, formerly owned by Cahaba Coal Mining Company
- Woodward, Alabama, formerly owned by Woodward Iron Company, later acquired by US Steel

=== Arizona ===
- Ajo, Arizona, owned by Phelps Dodge
- **Bagdad, Arizona**, owned by Freeport McMoRan (formerly Phelps Dodge)
- Clarkdale, Arizona, built, named for, and formerly owned by Senator William A. Clark's United Verde Copper Company
- Goodyear, Arizona, founded by and named after the Goodyear Tire and Rubber Company
- Kearny, Arizona, built by Kennecott Mining Company in 1958
- Litchfield Park, Arizona, built by and named after Goodyear CEO Paul W. Litchfield
- **Morenci, Arizona**, owned by Freeport McMoRan (formerly Phelps Dodge)
- San Manuel, Arizona, built for Magma Copper (later BHP)

=== Arkansas ===
- Bauxite, Arkansas, operated as a company town based on the aluminum industry until Alcoa ceased services in 1969.
- Blakely, Arkansas, founded by Dierks Lumber and Coal Company
- Bonanza, Arkansas, structured into a company town by Central Coal & Coke Company
- Burdette, Arkansas, established by the Three States Lumber Company in the early 1900s
- Crossett, Arkansas, constructed by Crossett Lumber Company
- Forester, Arkansas, founded in 1930 as a sawmill company town owned by Caddo River Lumber Company
- Graysonia, Arkansas, built by the Arkadelphia Lumber Company then incorporated with elected town officials to form a "company owned town".
- Huttig, Arkansas, built by the Frost-Johnson Timber Company
- Mountain Pine, Arkansas, founded by Dierks Lumber and Coal Company
- Okay, Arkansas, founded by Ideal Cement Company, which produced the OK brand.
- Trumann, Arkansas, developed by Poinsett Lumber Company, later to become the Singer Company, from decades of short-term lumber villages and camps.
- Wilson, Arkansas, started by The Wilson Company, initially a lumber company before transitioning to farming the cleared land.

=== California ===
- Betteravia, California, built by Union Sugar Company
- **Boron, California**, originally built by Pacific Coast Borax Company (now Rio Tinto Borax Mine)
- Chester, California, associated with The Collins Companies
- Cowell, California, built by Cowell Portland Cement
- Crannell, California, built by Little River Redwood Company
- Eagle Mountain, California, built by Kaiser Steel
- Fort Bragg, California, is a decommissioned United States Army post with residential development and California Western Railroad service overseen by the Union Lumber Company, later Georgia-Pacific
- Graeagle, California, owned by Fruit Growers Supply Company, an affiliate of Sunkist
- Guasti, California, established by the Italian Vineyard Company
- Hercules, California, built by the Hercules Powder Company
- Hilt, California, owned by Northern California Lumber Co., then purchased by the Fruit Growers Supply Company, an affiliate of Sunkist
- Irvine, California, built by The Irvine Company and incorporated in 1971; the largest planned community in the world, but technically not a company town.
- Kirkwood, California, Owned by Vail Resorts
- Korbel, Humboldt County, California, built by Humboldt Lumber Mill Company
- McCloud, California, built by McCloud River Railroad Lumber Company.
- Metropolitan, California, built by Metropolitan Redwood Lumber Company
- Nipton, California, owned by Spiegelworld
- Nortonville, California, owned by the Black Diamond Coal Mining Company
- Pino Grande, California, built by El Dorado Lumber Company
- Rockport, California, built by Cottoneva Lumber Company
- Ryan, California, built by the Pacific Coast Borax Company
- Samoa, California, built by Vance Lumber Company
- Scotia, California, largely owned by the Pacific Lumber Company (PALCO)
- Selby, California, owned by American Smelting and Refining Company.
- Spreckels, California, formerly owned by Spreckels Sugar Company
- Tormey, California, owned by American Smelting and Refining Company.
- **Trona, California**, formerly owned by American Potash and Chemical
- Usal, California, built by Usal Redwood Company
- Weed, California, named for sawmill owner Abner Weed
- Westwood, California, built by the Red River Lumber Company, sold in 1944 to Fruit Growers Supply Company, an affiliate of Sunkist
- Wheeler, California, built by lumber company

=== Colorado ===
- Climax, Colorado, built by the Climax Molybdenum Company, The residential houses were all transported to the West Park subdivision of Leadville, Colorado, before 1965, leaving only the mining buildings standing.
- Durango, Colorado, organized in 1880 by the Denver and Rio Grande Railroad
- Gilman, Colorado, built around (and eventually abandoned due to) the New Jersey Zinc Company's Eagle mine
- Ludlow, Colorado, was dominated by Colorado Fuel and Iron
- Portland, Fremont County, Colorado, built by the Ideal Cement Company

=== Connecticut ===
- Hazardville, Connecticut, industrial village centered around the Hazard Powder Company powder mill
- Collinsville, Connecticut, industrial village centered around the Collins Axe Company Manufacture of Machetes and Hand Axes

=== Florida ===
- **Lake Buena Vista**, **Bay Lake**, and the **Reedy Creek Improvement District** located within Walt Disney World Resort, which is owned by The Walt Disney Company
- Ybor City, built by Vicente Martinez Ybor for his cigar manufacturing businesses; now one of Tampa's top night spots

=== Hawaii ===
- Paia, Hawaii, developed by the Hawaiian Commercial & Sugar Co.
- Puʻunene, Hawaii, developed by the Hawaiian Commercial & Sugar Co.
- Pahala, Hawaii, developed by C. Brewer & Company, later Ka'u Sugar Company, after consolidation with Hutchinson Sugar Plantation Company in Na'alehu.
- Na'alehu, Hawaii, developed by Hutchinson Sugar Plantation In an effort spearheaded by Manager J. Beaty to "cityfy" the smaller plantation camps into one consolidated town.

=== Idaho ===
- Cobalt, Idaho, owned by the Howe Sound Mining Company (see Holden Village, Washington)
- Conda, Idaho (Anaconda Copper Mining Co.)
- Elk River, Idaho
- Headquarters, Idaho (Potlatch Lumber Company)
- Leadore, Idaho
- Potlatch, Idaho (Potlatch Lumber Company)

=== Illinois ===
- Granite City, Illinois, built by St. Louis Stamping Company, a steel company known for its "Granite ware" in which cooking utensils were made to look like granite
- Hegewisch, Chicago, founded by Adolph Hegewisch (President of the United States Rolling Stock Company) to emulate the company town of Pullman.
- Leclaire, Illinois, founded by N. O. Nelson (the owner of the Nelson Manufacturing Company) and named in honor of Edme-Jean Leclaire.
- Pullman, Chicago, once an independent city within Illinois, owned by the Pullman Sleeping Car Co.
- Naplate, built and formerly owned by the National Plate Glass Co.
- Steger, Illinois, built and formerly owned by Steger and Sons Piano.

=== Indiana ===
- Aetna, built by the Aetna Powder Company
- Gary, Indiana, built and formerly owned by U.S. Steel
- Marktown, built for the Mark Manufacturing Company in East Chicago
- Sunnyside, built and formerly owned by Inland Steel in East Chicago

=== Iowa ===
- Buxton, a camp of the Consolidation Coal Company, abandoned.
- Cleveland, a camp of the Whitebreast Coal and Mining Company, outside Lucas, abandoned.
- Everist, a camp of the Mammoth Vein Coal Company (later, the Empire Coal Company), abandoned.
- Muchakinock, a coal camp of the Consolidation Coal Company, abandoned.
- Newton, where the well-known Maytag company closed down in 2006.
- Numa and its abandoned suburb Martinstown, former home of the Numa Block Coal Company.
- Severs, south of Colfax camp of the Colfax Consolidated Coal Company, abandoned.
- Stone City, a town built by local limestone quarry businesses. Today an unincorporated community.

=== Kentucky ===
- Barthell, built by the Stearns Coal and Lumber Company in 1902.
- Benham, built and formerly owned by International Harvester.
- Blackey, built and formerly owned by Blackey Coal Company.
- Blue Heron, ghost town built by Stearns Coal and Lumber Company.
- David, built and formerly owned by Princess Elkhorn Coal Company.
- Fleming-Neon, built and formerly owned by Elkhorn Coal Corporation.
- Highsplint, built and formerly owned by High Splint Coal Company.
- Jenkins, built and formerly owned by Consolidation Coal Company.
- Lynch, built and formerly owned by U.S. Steel.
- Midway, built and laid out by Lexington and Ohio Railroad in 1830.
- Seco, built and formerly owned by South Eastern Coal Company.
- Stearns, built by Stearns Coal and Lumber Company.
- Stone, built and formerly owned by Pond Creek Coal Company. It was also owned by Fordson Coal Company and Eastern Coal Company.
- Thealka, built and formerly owned by North East Coal Company.
- Van Lear, built and formerly owned by Consolidation Coal Company.
- Wayland, built and formerly owned by Elk Horn Coal Company.
- Wheelwright, built and formerly owned by Elk Horn Coal Company.

=== Louisiana ===
- Bogalusa, Louisiana, started by Great Southern Lumber Company
- Cinclare, Louisiana, started by Harry L. Laws & Company
- Elizabeth, Louisiana started by Industrial Lumber Company
- Fisher, Louisiana, started by Louisiana Long Leaf Lumber Company
- Fullerton, Louisiana, started by the Gulf Lumber Company
- Garden City, Louisiana, started by Albert Hanson Lumber Company
- Glenmora, Louisiana started by Louisiana Sawmill Company Ltd.
- Kinder, Louisiana started by Peavy Byrnes Lumber Company
- Long Leaf, Louisiana started by Crowell and Spencer Lumber Company
- Pawnee, Louisiana
- Stables, Louisiana, started by the Gulf Lumber Company

=== Maine ===
- Chisholm, Maine, built by the Otis Falls Pulp & Paper Company
- Hastings, Maine, built by the Hastings Lumber Company
- Katahdin Iron Works, built by Piscataquis Iron Works Company
- Millinocket, Maine, 20th century residential development for the Great Northern Paper Company mill
- Milo, Maine, includes residential developments for employees of Bangor and Aroostook Railroad's Derby shops
- Newhall, Maine, residences for employees of Oriental Powder Company
- Rumford, Maine, includes residential developments by paper mill owner Hugh J. Chisholm
- Westbrook, Maine, 20th century economy dominated by S. D. Warren Paper Mill

=== Massachusetts ===
- Hopedale, Massachusetts, former home of the Draper Corporation, textile machine manufacturer.
- North Dighton, Massachusetts, former textile mill town, greatly expanded during the 1910s–1920s.
- Southbridge, Massachusetts, former mill town, known for the home of American Optical Company.
- Whitinsville, Massachusetts, former home of Whitin Machine Works, textile machine manufacturer.

=== Michigan ===
- Alberta, Michigan, started by Henry Ford
- Gwinn, Michigan, owned by Cleveland Cliffs Iron, nicknamed the "Model Town", because CCI intended its layout to be a model for all of their other company towns
- Hermansville, Michigan, started by the Wisconsin Land & Lumber Company

=== Minnesota ===
- Akeley, Minnesota, developed by T. B. Walker and named for his business partner, Healy C. Akeley
- Babbitt, Minnesota and Silver Bay, Minnesota, developed by Reserve Mining Co.
- Elcor, Minnesota, developed by Pickands Mather & Company
- Hoyt Lakes, Minnesota, developed by Erie Mining Co.
- Morgan Park, Duluth, Minnesota, built by U.S. Steel and named for J.P. Morgan
- Splitrock, Minnesota, developed by the Split Rock Lumber Company

=== Mississippi ===
- Bankston, Mississippi, ghost town, former location of Bankston Textile Mill
- Electric Mills, Mississippi, started by Sumter Lumber Company
- Fernwood, Mississippi, started by Fernwood Lumber Company

=== Missouri ===
- Deering, Missouri, established by Deering Harvester Company or its successor International Harvester Company and later acquired by Wisconsin Lumber Company, which eventually ceased operations and divested it
- Grandin, Missouri, established by Missouri Lumber and Mining Company
- Leadwood, Missouri, developed by St. Joe Lead
- Trenton, Missouri, Ruskin College acquired all the businesses in the hopes of building a utopian society

=== Montana ===
- Colstrip, Montana, a coal strip mining town formerly owned by Montana Power Company
- Trident, Montana, a former Portland cement company town owned by Holcim

=== Nevada ===
- Boulder City, Nevada, built and formerly owned by the United States Bureau of Reclamation
- Empire, Nevada, owned by USG Corporation
- McGill, Nevada, owned by Kennecott Copper Corporation
- Ruth, Nevada, owned by Kennecott Copper Corporation
- Weed Heights, Nevada, owned by Anaconda Copper Company

=== New Hampshire ===
- Berlin, New Hampshire, residential development for wood products manufacturing by Berlin Mills Company
- Harrisville, New Hampshire, historic textile mill village; National Historic Landmark

=== New Jersey ===
- Haskell, New Jersey, named for Laflin & Rand company president Jonathan Haskell
- Helmetta, New Jersey, built by snuff manufacturer, George Washington Helme of the Helme Tobacco Company and named after his daughter, Etta
- Manville, New Jersey, the largest tract of land was the Johns Manville Corporation
- Maurer, Perth Amboy built by brick manufacturer after the Civil War and later absorbed into Perth Amboy
- Roebling, New Jersey, a factory village within the limits of Florence, New Jersey; the town was owned by the Roebling Steel Corporation run by the descendants of John A. Roebling

=== New Mexico ===
- Madrid, New Mexico, residential development for miners of the Albuquerque and Cerrillos Coal Company
- Playas, New Mexico, built by Phelps Dodge Corporation

=== New York ===
- Cohoes, New York, formerly owned by Harmony Mills
- Endicott, New York planned and incorporated by Endicott Johnson Corporation
- Johnson City, New York renamed by and after George F. Johnson of the Endicott Johnson Corporation
- Oneida, New York, incorporated 1848 by the Oneida Community which later became Oneida Limited
- Steinway Village, the part of New York City in Astoria, Queens used by employees of Steinway & Sons

=== North Carolina ===
- Bunn, North Carolina, a former company town previously owned by the Montgomery Lumber Company
- Bynum, North Carolina, formerly owned by J.M. Odell Manufacturing Company (town purchased by the county in the 1970s)
- Canton, North Carolina, a company town built-up by the Champion International Paper Company
- Kannapolis, North Carolina, owned by the Cannon Mills Company
- Saxapahaw, North Carolina, formerly owned by Sellers Manufacturing Company

=== Ohio ===
- Glenwillow, Ohio, built by the Austin Powder Company
- Goes Station, Ohio, built by the Miami Powder Company
- Kings Mills, Ohio, built by the Great Western Powder Company and Peters Cartridge Company
- McDonald, Ohio, built and formerly owned by the Carnegie Steel Company (later U.S. Steel)
- Rossford, Ohio, founded by the Edward Ford Plate Glass Company (later Libbey-Owens-Ford)

=== Oklahoma ===
- Broken Bow, Oklahoma
- Wright City, Oklahoma, built by the Choctaw Lumber Company

=== Oregon ===
- Algoma, Oregon, supported by the Algoma Lumber Company
- Bradwood, Oregon
- Brookings, Oregon, built by John E. Brookings and sold to California & Oregon Lumber Company
- Dee, Oregon
- Gilchrist, Oregon
- Grand Ronde, Oregon
- Hines, Oregon
- Kinzua, Oregon
- Maxville, Oregon
- Mowich, Oregon
- Neverstill, Oregon
- Olney, Oregon
- Orenco, Oregon, Oregon Nursery Company
- Perry, Oregon
- Pine Ridge, Oregon
- Pondosa, Oregon
- Powers, Oregon
- Shevlin, Oregon
- Southport, Oregon, owned by the Black Diamond Coal Mining Company
- Starkey, Oregon
- Valsetz, Oregon
- Vanport, Oregon
- Vaughn, Oregon
- Wauna, Oregon
- Wendling, Oregon
- Westfir, Oregon
- Wheeler, Tillamook County, Oregon
- Wilark, Oregon

=== Pennsylvania ===
- Aliquippa, Pennsylvania, former home of the Jones & Laughlin Steel Company
- Ambridge, Pennsylvania, formed in 1905 by the American Bridge Company
- Braddock, Pennsylvania, dominated by Carnegie Steel Company and later by U.S. Steel
- Buck Run, Pennsylvania, built by James B. Neale between 1902 and 1943 for his anthracite coal miners and their families. By 1925, his company town boasted of a school, an infirmary, a community recreation facility, a company store and several churches in addition to homes for the miners with running water, electricity and steam heat. The Buck Run colliery was located outside of Pottsville, in Schuylkill County.
- Ford City, Pennsylvania, organized in 1887 by PPG Industries
- **Hershey, Pennsylvania**, built by Hershey Chocolate Corporation
- Kistler, Pennsylvania, built by the Mount Union Refractories Company in 1918, designed by John Nolen
- Lake Trade, Pennsylvania, a now defunct coal mining town in Venango Township, Northern Butler County
- Lawrence Park Township, Pennsylvania, built by General Electric Company in 1919
- Natrona, Pennsylvania, built by the Pennsylvania Salt Manufacturing Company in the 1850s with later additions
- Peale, Pennsylvania (1883–1912)
- Saxonburg, Pennsylvania, founded by John A. Roebling and other German immigrants it was the site of his first wire works in the United States (see also Roebling, New Jersey)
- Claghorn, Vintondale, and Wehrum, Pennsylvania, built by the Lackawanna Coal Company
- Tacony, Philadelphia, built by Henry Disston for workers at his saw factory
- Wilmerding, Pennsylvania, a borough formed by the Westinghouse Air Brake Company
- Vandergrift, Pennsylvania, established by George McCurtry, President of Apollo Iron and Steel Company
- Woolrich, Pennsylvania, the home of Woolrich, Inc.

=== Rhode Island ===
- Slatersville, Rhode Island, historic former mill village

=== South Carolina ===
- Newry, South Carolina
- Piedmont, South Carolina

=== South Dakota ===
- East Sioux Falls, South Dakota, an old quarrying town east of Sioux Falls, owned by the East Sioux Falls Quarry Company.

=== Tennessee ===
- Alcoa, Tennessee, formerly owned by Alcoa and still economically dominated by the company
- Bemis, Tennessee, built by the Bemis Bag Company for mill workers; now a history district in Jackson
- Coalmont, Tennessee, operated by the Sewanee Coal, Coke and Land Company
- Norris, Tennessee, built and formerly owned by the Tennessee Valley Authority
- Oak Ridge, Tennessee, built in secret by the United States government for the Manhattan Project; controlled by the federal government until 1959
- Old Hickory, Tennessee, built to house DuPont employees; now a suburb of Nashville

=== Texas ===
- Camden, Texas, owned by the W.T. Carter & Brother Lumber Company and its successors
- Lake Jackson, Texas, developed as a company town for workers of the Dow Chemical Company
- **Starbase, Texas**, developed by SpaceX
- Sugar Land, Texas, once owned and run by the Imperial Sugar Company, transformed into an upscale suburb of Houston
- Thurber, Texas, owned by a coal-mining subsidiary of the Texas and Pacific Railway. It was the site of a large brick factory, using the mine's low grade coal

=== Utah ===
- Bacchus, Utah, Hercules Powder Company, now a ghost town
- Bingham Canyon, Utah
- Bryce Canyon City, Utah, built and owned by Ruby's Inn and the Syrett family, owners of Ruby's Inn

=== Vermont ===
- Proctor, Vermont, once owned by the Vermont Marble Company; the town of Proctor was under the control of Senator Redfield Proctor

=== Virginia ===
- Bacova, Virginia, created by the Tidewater Lumber Company. The name Bacova was selected by the company as shorthand for Bath County, Va.
- Bassett, Virginia, dominated by Bassett Furniture company, still housing the company's headquarters
- Fries, Virginia, created by the Washington Mill.
- Saltville, Virginia, dominated by Mathieson Alkali Works and its successors through the Olin Corporation
- Stanleytown, Virginia was dominated by Stanley Furniture

=== Washington ===
- Alpine, Washington, owned by Alpine Lumber Company
- Barneton, Washington, owned by Kent Lumber Company, bought in 1911 by Seattle City Light, razed in 1924
- Black Diamond, Washington, owned by the Black Diamond Coal Mining Company, sold to the Pacific Coast Company in 1904
- Bodie, Washington, and its related Bodie Mine controlled by the Northern Gold Company
- Bordeaux, Washington, logging town abandoned in the 1940s after depleting local resources
- Coulee Dam, Washington, originally two adjacent company towns created in 1933 to support the construction of Grand Coulee Dam – Mason City, owned by lead construction contractor Consolidated Builders Inc., and Engineers' Town, owned by the U.S. Bureau of Reclamation. CBI transferred control of Mason City to Reclamation in 1942. Reclamation then combined Engineers' Town and Mason City into Coulee Dam in 1948, began selling the town to its inhabitants in 1957, and completed the divestiture in 1959, when Coulee Dam officially incorporated as a town.
- Diablo, Washington is a running settlement in unincorporated Whatcom County, it was created by Seattle City Light in 1930
- Dupont, Washington, provided housing to workers at a dynamite factory on the waterfront operated by E. I. du Pont de Nemours and Company.
- Holden, Washington, built by the Howe Sound Mining Company, which also owned Britannia Beach; once the most productive copper mine in the U.S., the mine closed in 1957 and it and the townsite were sold to a unit of the Lutheran church for $1 in the 1950s; now run as a Christian retreat center
- Hooper, Washington, owned by the McGregor Land and Livestock Company
- Longview, Washington, established in 1921 by the Long-Bell Lumber Company and led by Robert A. Long the lumber baron from Kansas.
- Newhalem, Washington, owned by Seattle City Light, as is nearby Diablo
- Port Gamble, Washington, still owned by Pope & Talbot but the lumber mill has not operated since the mid-1990s
- Richland, Washington, run by the Army Corps of Engineers during and after WWII to house Hanford Site workers
- Roche Harbor, Washington, formerly supporting lime kilns owned by Tacoma and Roche Harbor Lime Company
- Ruston, Washington, established by industrialist William Rust; the town's primary industry was an ASARCO copper smelting plant
- Snoqualmie Falls, Washington, established by Weyerhaeuser. It was abandoned on an unknown date.

=== West Virginia ===
- Cass, West Virginia, founded in 1901 for West Virginia Pulp and Paper Company logging the nearby mountains
- Coalwood, West Virginia, formerly owned by the Olga Coal Company
- Gary, West Virginia, formerly owned by U.S. Steel
- Grant Town, West Virginia, built by the Federal Coal and Coke Company, which built and operated the Federal No. 1 Mine.
- Kay Moor or Kaymoor, West Virginia, owned by the Low Moor Iron Company

=== Wisconsin ===
- Fosterville, Wisconsin, was built by John J. Foster of the Vilas County Lumber Company. Now it is named Presque Isle, Wisconsin
- Goodman, Wisconsin, built by Goodman Lumber Co.
- Kohler, Wisconsin, built by the Kohler Company
- Laona, Wisconsin, built by the William D. Connor's Connor Company
- Winegar, Wisconsin, Fosterville renamed by William S. Winegar of the Vilas County Lumber Company in 1910. Now named Presque Isle, Wisconsin

=== Wyoming ===
- Bairoil, Wyoming became a company town supported by Amoco
- Jeffrey City, Wyoming was built in 1957 to house employees of nearby Western Nuclear uranium mining and milling operations. Other uranium mining companies built housing adjacent to the town to take advantage of its location and infrastructure. The townsite was sold off in an auction in the 1990s.
- Gas Hills, Wyoming was composed of several mining companies' towns, the largest of which was owned by Lucky Mc Uranium.
- Shirley Basin, Wyoming was another uranium mining company town owned by Utah Construction and Mining's uranium operations.
- Sinclair, Wyoming supported by Sinclair Oil.
- Table Rock, Wyoming was built in the 1970s to support the nearby Colorado Interstate Gas processing plant.
- Wright, Wyoming was built by ARCO in the 1970s to support its Black Thunder Coal Mine. Wright incorporated in 1985
