= Federal Explosives Act of 1917 =

US Federal Statutory Law

- Long title: An Act to prohibit the manufacture, distribution, storage, use, and possession in time of war of explosives, providing regulations for the safe manufacture, distribution, storage, use, and possession of the same, and for other purposes.
- Nicknames: Explosives Act of 1917
- Enacted by: the 65th United States Congress
- Effective: November 14, 1917

Citations
- Public law: Pub. L. 65–68
- Statutes at Large: 40 Stat. 385

Codification
- Titles amended: 50 U.S.C.: War and National Defense
- U.S.C. sections created: 50 U.S.C. ch. 8 § 121 et seq.

Legislative history
- Introduced in the House as H.R. 3932 by Martin D. Foster (D–IL) on May 1, 1917; Passed the House on May 31, 1917 (Passed); Passed the Senate on July 17, 1917 (Passed); Reported by the joint conference committee on September 15, 1917; agreed to by the House on September 29, 1917 (Agreed) and by the Senate on September 29, 1917 (Agreed); Signed into law by President Woodrow Wilson on October 6, 1917

Federal Explosives Act of 1917 is a United States federal statutory law citing an incriminating act for the distribution, manufacture, possession, storage, and use of explosive material during the time of war. The Act of Congress authorizes the federal regulation of the distribution, manufacture, possession, storage, and use of incendiary material during wartime.

The Act was passed by the 65th United States Congress and enacted into law by President Woodrow Wilson on October 6, 1917.

== Provisions of 1917 Act ==
The United States Bureau of Mines governs the federal regulations for restrictive protocols with regards to explosive materials.

- Combustible ingredients are held or purchased in minimal quantities
- Data and formulation processes prohibited from disclosure
- Explosive inspectors authorized by U.S. Bureau of Mines
- Explosive possession is prohibited for unlicensed entities
- Federal licensing applies for blasting agents at mines and quarries
- Federal licensing is subject to discretionary refusal
- Revocation is authorized for a federal explosive license

Federal Explosive License Classifications

Exporter license
Foreman license
Importer license
Manufacturer license
Purchaser license
Technical license (Analyst, Educator, Inventor, Investigator)
Vendor license

== Presidential Proclamation of 1917 ==
In accordance with the Trading with the Enemy Act of 1917, President Woodrow Wilson issued Presidential Proclamation 1364 on April 6, 1917. The presidential statement proclaimed national security protections regarding domestic alien enemies petitioning for aggressive terrorist tactics against the United States.

== Precious Metal Regulation of 1918 ==
The Sundry Civil Expenses Appropriations Act of 1918 applied the unlicensed enforcement prohibitions of the federal explosive act for iridium, palladium, platinum, and precious metal compounds.

== Amendment and Cancellation of 1917 Act ==
The Federal Explosives Act Amendment of 1941 appended the 1917 public law revitalizing the federal scope for the perils of World War II. On July 25, 1947, President Harry S. Truman signed a Senate Joint Resolution ceasing provisions of the Federal Explosives Act with the cessation of the European theatre of World War II and Pacific War.

== Repeal of 1917 Act ==
The 1917 Act was repealed by the enactment of Organized Crime Control Act on October 15, 1970.

== B.S.A. Blasting Caps Awareness Program ==
In 1947, the Boy Scouts of America and Institute of Makers of Explosives established a safety awareness program for the disposal and identification of electric and non-electric blasting caps.

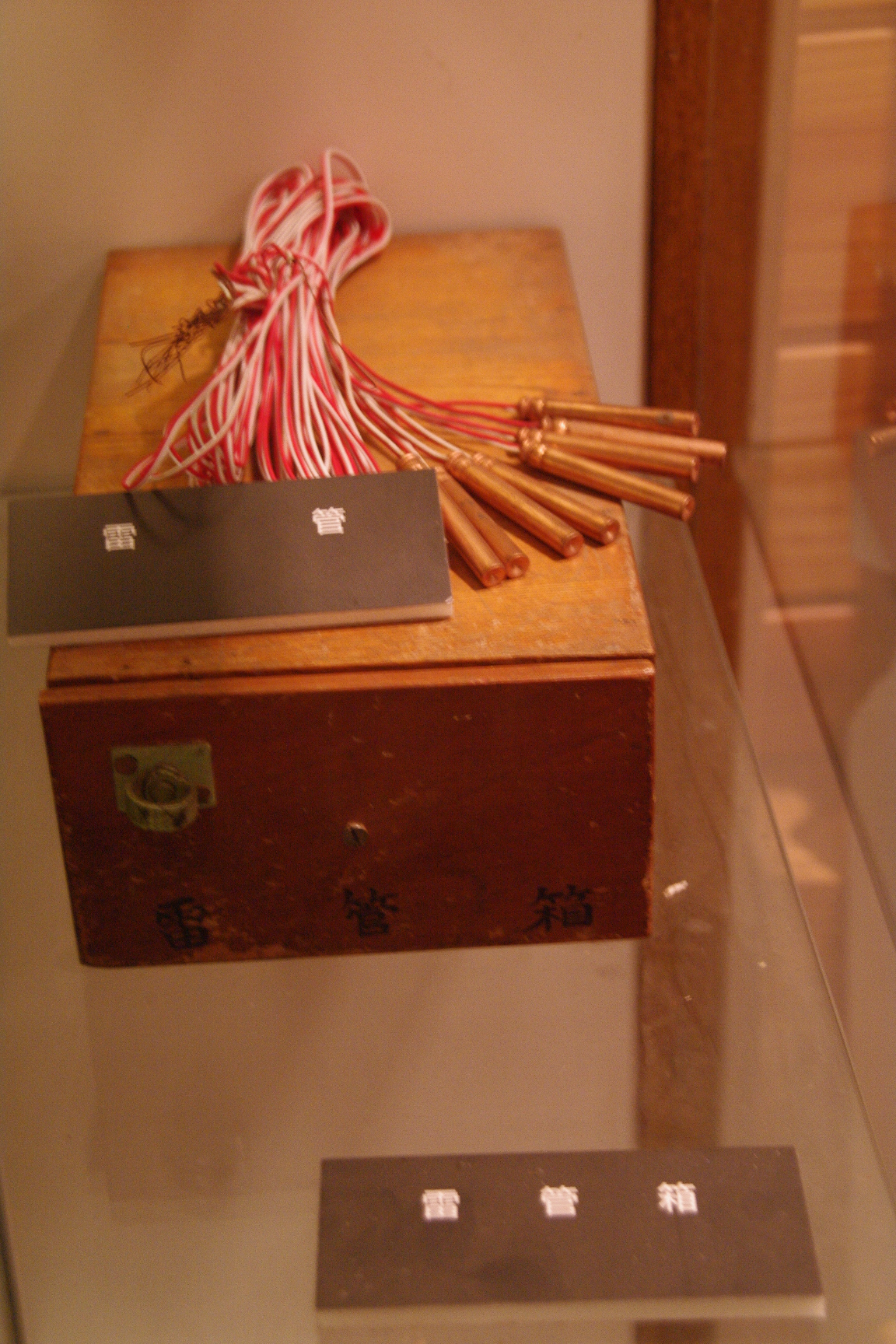
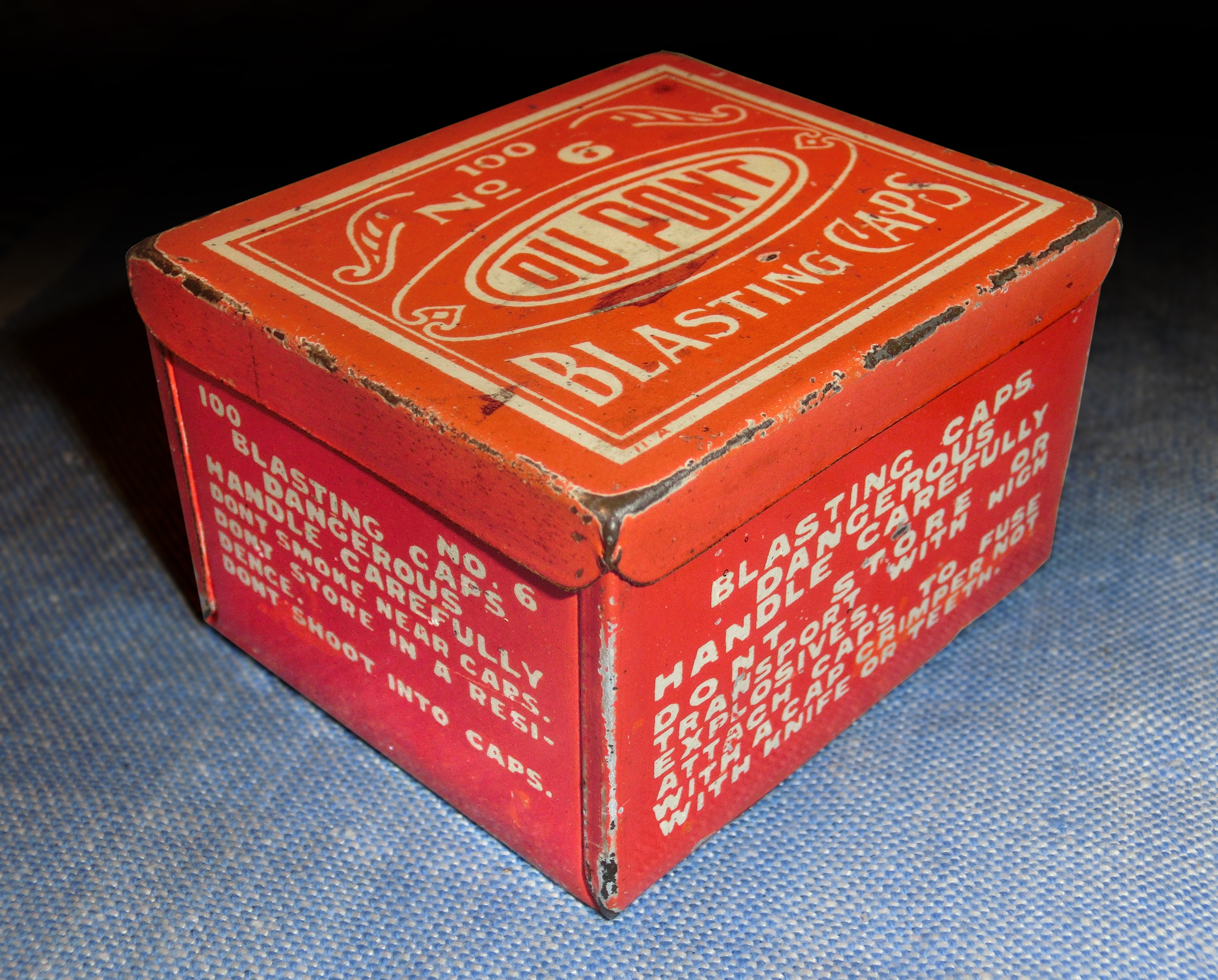
Illustrations of Blasting Caps
- "I'm A Blasting Cap". Boys' Life. Boy Scouts of America. May 1951. p. 30.
- "Don't Touch Blasting Caps". Boys' Life. Boy Scouts of America. May 1953. p. 54.
- "Blasting Caps Are Dangerous! - Leave Them Alone!". Boys' Life. Boy Scouts of America. July 1958. p. 35-C6.
- "Blasting Cap Safety Bookmark". Boys' Life. Boy Scouts of America. February 1969. p. 54.
- "Blasting Cap Safety Bookmark". Boys' Life. Boy Scouts of America. June 1969. p. 64.
- "Blasting Cap Safety Bookmark". Boys' Life. Boy Scouts of America. September 1969. p. 65.
- "Blasting Cap Safety Bookmark". Boys' Life. Boy Scouts of America. October 1969. p. 68.
- "Scouts in Action - Dynamite Blasting Caps". Boys' Life. Boy Scouts of America. February 1975. pp. 46–47.

== See also ==
American entry into World War I	TNT
Dynamite	1919 United States anarchist bombings
Federal Mines Safety Act of 1910	Preparedness Day Bombing
Gunpowder	Preparedness Movement
Niter	Progressive Era
Nitroglycerin	Saltpetre
Time bomb	Wall Street bombing

Industrial Explosions of 1917

Ashton-under-Lyne munitions explosion	Gillespie Company Shell Loading Explosion
Black Tom explosion	Halifax Explosion
Eddystone explosion	Silvertown explosion

Propellant Powder Mills of 18th & 19th Century America

American Powder Mills	Giant Powder Company
Austin Powder Company	Great Western Powder Works
California Powder Works	Hazard Powder Company
Confederate Powder Works	Laflin & Rand Powder Company
Eleutherian Mills	Miami Powder Company
Equitable Powder Company	Oriental Powder Company
Frankford Powder-Mill	Schaghticoke Powder Company

19th Century Scientists of Combustible Chemistry & Materials

Frederick Abel	Joseph LeConte
William Bickford	Alfred Nobel
James Dewar	Christian Friedrich Schönbein
Lammot du Pont I	Ascanio Sobrero
Edward Charles Howard	Julius Wilbrand

Anti-Radicalism Reforms of 19th & 20th Century America

Immigration Act of 1882	Immigration Act of 1917
Immigration Act of 1891	Immigration Act of 1918
Immigration Act of 1903	Immigration Act of 1921
Immigration Act of 1907	Immigration Act of 1924

Film Depictions of Anarchists' Movements in United States

J. Edgar (2011)	Richard Jewell (2019)
No God, No Master (2012)	Manhunt: Unabomber (2017) & Deadly Games (2020)
Patriots Day (2016)	Ted K (2021)

== Historical Archive ==
- Sikes, James; Avery, John; Bowdoin, James (March 12, 1777). "Three Documents Regarding the Manufacturing of Saltpeter". Internet Archive. Massachusetts Bay Colony: Springfield, Massachusetts.
- "GUNPOWDER AND ITS MANUFACTURE.; Where and How it is Made The Materials Where Found A New Discovery in Cannon Powder". The New York Times. New York, N.Y. August 10, 1861.
- Leconte, Joseph (1862). "Saltpeter Instructions for the Manufacture of Saltpetre". Internet Archive. Columbia, S.C.: Charles P. Pelham, State Printer. OCLC 14698867.
- Guttmann, Oscar (1895). The Manufacture of Explosives: A Theoretical and Practical Treatise on the History, the Physical and Chemical Properties, and the Manufacture of Explosives. Vol. 1. Whittaker and Co. – via Internet Archive.
- Guttmann, Oscar (1895). The Manufacture of Explosives: A Theoretical and Practical Treatise on the History, the Physical and Chemical Properties, and the Manufacture of Explosives. Vol. 2. Whittaker and Co. – via Internet Archive.

== Reading Bibliography ==
- "Farming with Dynamite: An Improvement in Farming That Is Proving Greater Than Irrigation". Internet Archive. E.I. du Pont de Nemours & Co. 1911.
- "The Use of Explosives for Agricultural and Other Purposes". Internet Archive. Institute of Makers of Explosives. 1917.
- "DuPont Blasters' Handbook". Internet Archive. E.I. du Pont de Nemours & Co. 1918.
- "General Information and Rulings for the Enforcement of the Law Regulating Explosives and Their Ingredients" [Public no. 68, 65th Congress; H.R. 3932]. Hathitrust Digital Library. Washington, D.C.: U.S. Government Printing Office. 1918. OCLC 2414892.
- Williams, William B. (1919). "History of the Manufacture of Explosives for the Great War, 1917-1918". Internet Archive. United States Army Ordnance Department.
- "DuPont Blasters' Handbook". Internet Archive. E.I. du Pont de Nemours & Co. 1922.
- Roberts, Jr., Harry; Greensfelder, Nelson Sutro (1923). "The Explosives Engineer". Hathitrust Digital Library. Wilmington, Delaware: Hercules Powder Company. OCLC 1568662.
- Van Gelder, Arthur Pine; Schlatter, Hugo (1927). History of the Explosives Industry in America. New York: Columbia University Press. LCCN 72005051. OCLC 1688246.
- "Safety in the Handling and Use of Explosives". Internet Archive. Institute of Makers of Explosives. 1940.
- Wilkinson, Norman B. (1984). Lammot du Pont and the American Explosives Industry, 1850-1884. Charlottesville, VA: University of Virginia Press. ISBN 978-0813910123. OCLC 933801959.
- "National Park Service Handbook for the Transportation, and Use of Explosives". NPS Park History. National Park Service. 1999.
- Hopler, Robert B. (2001). Explosives 100 Years Ago, More or Less: The Book. Cleveland, OH: International Society for Explosive Engineers. ISBN 978-1892396129. OCLC 47227715.
- "Blasting Caps in the Parks" (PDF). Curatorial Safety. National Park Service. July 2003. Archived from the original (PDF) on January 15, 2012.
- Kelly, Jack (2004). Gunpowder: Alchemy, Bombards, and Pyrotechnics: The History of the Explosive that Changed the World. New York, N.Y.: Basic Books. ISBN 978-0786739004. OCLC 53796866.
- Cressy, David (2013). Saltpeter: The Mother of Gunpowder. England, UK: Oxford University Press. ISBN 978-0199695751. OCLC 909362252.
