= Gunpowder Mills =

A gunpowder mill is a mill where gunpowder is made.

Gunpowder Mills may refer to:

== Europe ==
- Ballincollig Royal Gunpowder Mills in Ireland
- Faversham Royal Gunpowder Mills in England
- Waltham Abbey Royal Gunpowder Mills in England
- Low Wood Gunpowder Works in Furness, England
- Littleton gunpowder works in Somerset, England
- Camilty Gunpowder Mills in West Lothian, Scotland

== USA ==
- California Powder Works in California
- Hazard Powder Company in Connecticut
- Eleutherian Mills in Delaware
- Confederate Powderworks in Georgia
- Oriental Powder Company in Maine
- American Powder Mills in Massachusetts
- Laflin & Rand Powder Company in New York
- Austin Powder Company in Ohio
- Miami Powder Company in Ohio
- Frankford Powder-Mill in Pennsylvania
