= .45-75 Winchester =

Rifle cartridge

.45-75 Winchester Centennial
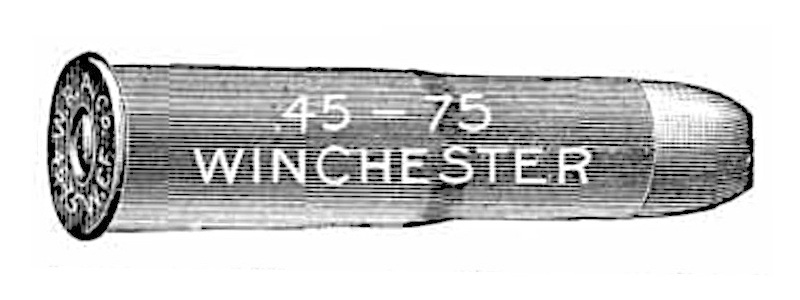
- Type: Rifle
- Place of origin: United States

Production history
- Designed: 1876
- Manufacturer: Winchester Repeating Arms Company
- Produced: 1876–1935

Specifications
- Case type: Rimmed, bottleneck
- Bullet diameter: 11.39 mm (0.448 in)
- Neck diameter: 12.20 mm (0.480 in)
- Shoulder diameter: 13.87 mm (0.546 in)
- Base diameter: 14.24 mm (0.561 in)
- Rim diameter: 15.81 mm (0.622 in)
- Rim thickness: 1.41 mm (0.056 in)
- Case length: 47.86 mm (1.884 in)
- Overall length: 56.52 mm (2.225 in)

Ballistic performance
Bullet mass/type	Velocity	Energy
350 gr (23 g) Lead	1,383 ft/s (422 m/s)	1,485 ft⋅lbf (2,013 J)

The .45-75 Winchester / 11.62x48mmR Centennial is an intermediate centerfire rifle cartridge developed in 1876 for the newly designed Winchester Model 1876 Centennial lever-action rifle. Winchester Repeating Arms Company introduced the rifle and cartridge at the United States Centennial Exposition. The Model 1876 rifle used an enlarged version of the famous Winchester Model 1873 action to offer a lever-action repeating rifle using cartridges suitable for big-game hunting. The cartridge and rifle enjoyed brief popularity with Gilded Age American hunters including Theodore Roosevelt, and was issued to the Canadian North-West Mounted Police and to Texas Rangers.

== Description ==
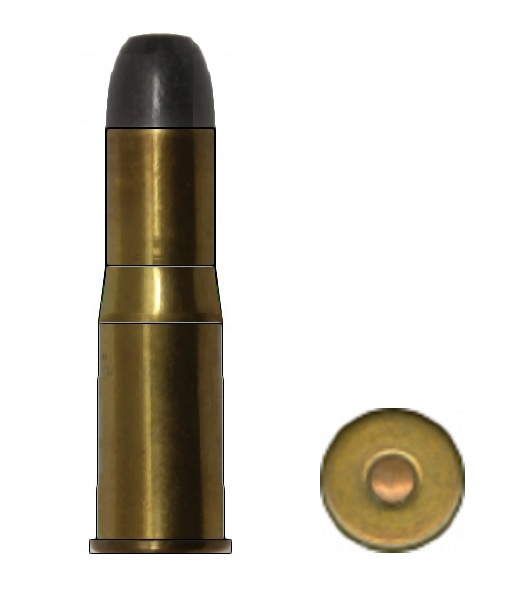
A .45-75 Winchester cartridge

Nomenclature of the era indicated the .45-75 cartridge contained a 0.45-inch (11.43 mm) diameter bullet with 75 grains (4.9 g) of gunpowder. Early Winchester ammunition boxes suggested reloading empty cartridge cases with government musket powder or with American Powder Company Deadshot Fg, Hazard Powder Company Sea Shooting Fg, DuPont Rifle FFg, Oriental Powder Company Western Sporting Fg, Laflin & Rand Orange Rifle Fg, or Austin Powder Company Rifle Powder FFg. Boxes also recommended casting bullets from an alloy of one part tin and sixteen parts lead and lubricating bullets with Japan wax or tallow.

The .45-75 was shorter and fatter than the .45-70 government cartridge. Although the .45-75 was nominally superior to the popular .45-70, the weak toggle-link action with its elevator-style carrier originally designed for handgun cartridges limited the ability of the Model 1876 rifle to safely fire higher pressure loads intended for stronger actions. Within a decade, the Model 1876's advantage of faster loading for subsequent shots was eclipsed by the stronger and smoother Winchester Model 1886 action capable of handling longer cartridges, including the .45-70 with varying lengths for 300 and 500 grain bullets.

The Kennedy lever-action rifle manufactured by Whitney Arms Company was also chambered for the .45-75. The .45-75 and similarly short .40-60 Winchester, .45-60 Winchester, and .50-95 Winchester Express cartridges designed for the Model 1876 rifle faded into obsolescence as 20th-century hunters preferred more powerful smokeless powder loadings of longer cartridges designed for stronger rifles. Winchester production of .45-75 cartridges ended during the Great Depression.

== Dimensions ==
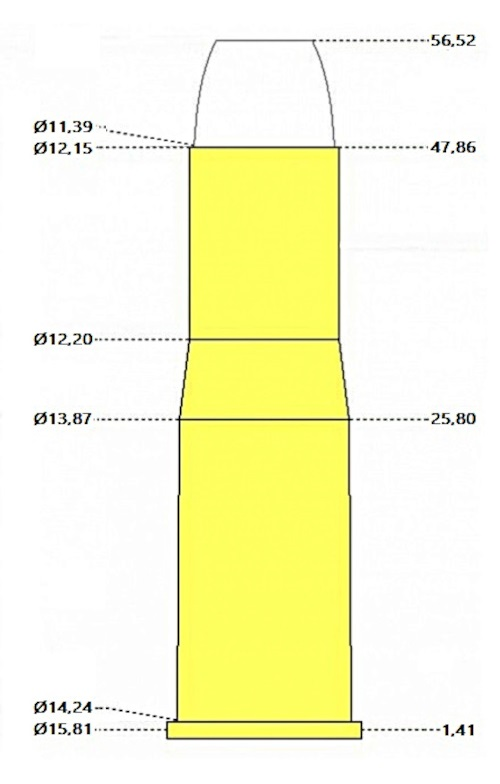

== See also ==
- List of Winchester Center Fire cartridges
- Table of handgun and rifle cartridges
- List of cartridges by caliber
- List of rifle cartridges
- List of rimmed cartridges
- .44-40 Winchester
- .444 Marlin
- .44 Henry
- .450 No 2 Nitro Express
