= Augustus George Hazard =

19th-century Connecticut gunpowder tycoon

Augustus Hazard
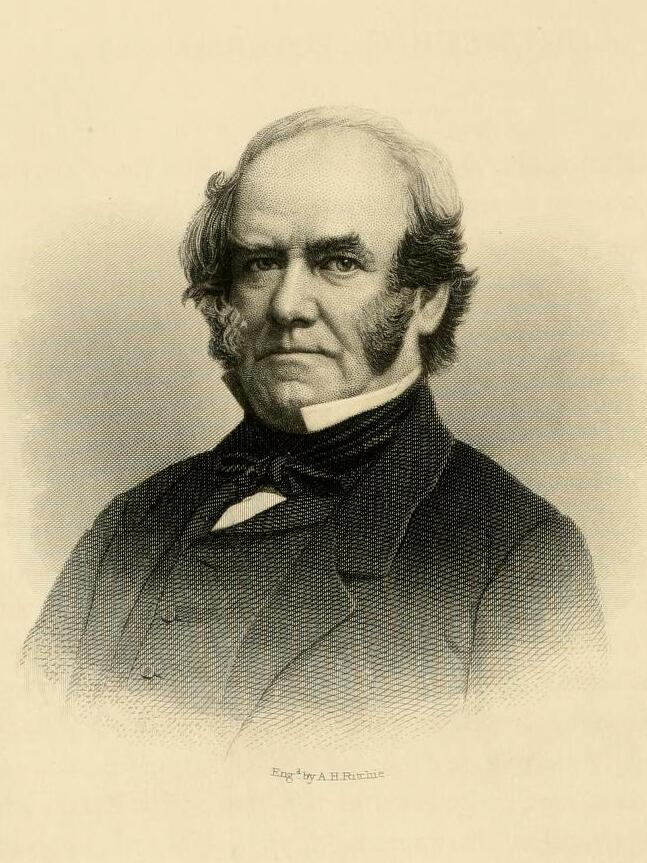

Personal details
- Born: April 4, 1802
- Died: May 7, 1868 (aged 66)

Augustus George Hazard (April 28, 1802 – May 7, 1868) was an American gunpowder manufacturer and the namesake of Hazardville, Connecticut.

Hazard was born in Kingston, Rhode Island, on April 28, 1802, a son of Thomas Sylvester and Silence Knowles Hazard. He is a seventh generation descendant of Thomas Hazard, the progenitor of the Hazard Family, found on the list of early settlers of Rhode Island and the Colony of Rhode Island and Providence Plantations.

His family moved to Connecticut when he was six years old, where he lived and worked on the family farm until the age of 15. As a young man, he worked as a sales merchant in Savannah, Georgia.

Col. Hazard married Salome Goodwin Merrill on July 24, 1821, in Hartford Connecticut, and together they had eight children. In 1827 he relocated to New York City, where he was a commission agent engaged in selling gunpowder and other products. In 1837 he bought 25% of a gunpowder production company established by Allen A. Denslow and three Loomis brothers, Parks, Allen, and Neelands Loomis which had been established two years earlier on the Scantic River in Scitico, near the town of Enfield, Connecticut. He assumed sole ownership of the company in 1843. The business was known thereafter as the Hazard Powder Company, and the village that supported it became known as Hazardville.

Col. Hazard and Salome returned to Connecticut in the 1840s in order to oversee his business and raise their family. He built his mansion on Enfield Street. It was here that many prominent individuals were entertained, including inventor and gunmaker Samuel Colt, eminent statesmen and lawyer Daniel Webster, and the then Secretary of War, under President Franklin Pierce's administration, Jefferson Davis.

The growth of the Hazard Powder Co. from 1845 to 1855 was enormous, but not without personal loss. On April 4, 1855, Col. Hazard's son, Horace, was killed at age 23 in an explosion at the factory.

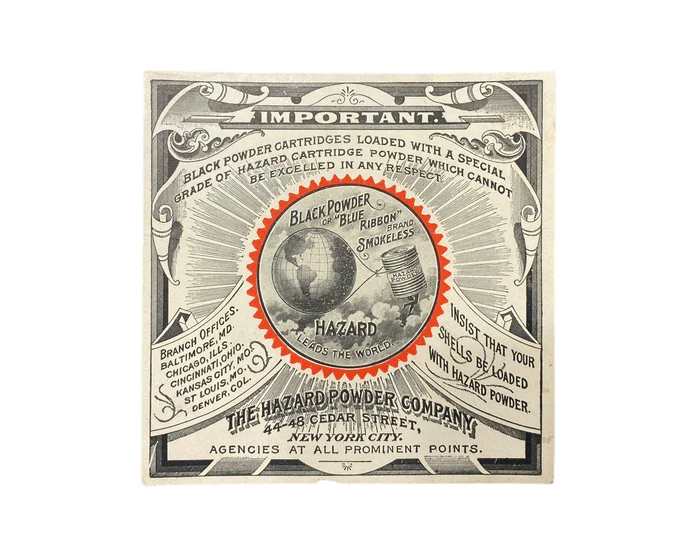
Hazard Powder Company label

Before the American Civil War, when the nation was unified, trade was conducted between northern and southern states. Hazard was a good friend of many illustrious business men in the South, he socialized with then U.S. Secretary of War Jefferson Davis before the conflict, he had developed many business relationships as a paint salesman in Georgia. Apparently he briefly joined the Georgian Militia before the war, earning the title "Colonel", which stuck.

The war with Mexico in 1846, the 1849 California gold rush, and the 1854 Crimean War all brought huge orders for gunpowder of all types. The Hazard Powder Company sold gunpowder to both Britain and Russia, adversaries in the Crimean conflict. In 1849 Paul Greeley, Tudor and Frank Gowdy, and Wells Loomis formed a competing company – the Enfield Powder Company.

On the same evening as the barns of John King, principal owner of the Enfield Powder Company burned to the ground, Albert Olmstead, Esq., of Enfield, a member of the State House of Representatives was called to Chair a meeting of the residents of the west end of Enfield where a motion was made and passed name the carved-out village Hazardville in honor of the Colonel himself. Four years and multiple casualties later, Enfield Powder was absorbed by Hazard Powder.

The Hazard Powder Company survived the depression of 1857 because of strong demand for powder for railroad construction and metal mining in the west, as well as cooperation with du Pont.

By January 1864 Hazard Powder supplied the Union Forces with 12,500 pounds (5,700 kg) of powder daily, nearly a quarter of the Union total. The mill at Hazardville was in operation 24 hours a day and produced a large percentage of the gunpowder used during the Civil War by the Union.

South of the Mason–Dixon line, Confederate Powderworks was the second largest gunpowder factory in the world at that time, producing 3.5 tons per day. Jefferson Davis, the president of the Confederacy assigned George Washington Rains to develop a national gunpowder manufacturing facility in 1831 and gave him carte blanche to do so. More than 2.75 million pounds of first-quality gunpowder (a majority of the powder used by the Confederacy) were produced before its closure in 1865.

By comparison, Union gunpowder manufacture was distributed among many mills, with the larger Hazard Powder Company of Connecticut producing a large portion of the annual production of 8.4 million pounds. Hazard Powder was one of the three largest (with DuPont and Laflin & Rand) among the six companies of the United States Gunpowder Trade Association (popularly known as the " powder trust").

From March 11,1839 to January 13, 1913, 67 employees were killed by explosions. The most disastrous accident on July 23, 1862 caused the deaths of nine men.

Arthur Van Gelder and Hugo Schlatter, in "History of the Explosives Industry in America" (1927), consider Hazard Powder "one of the three great American powder companies in the nineteenth century"

Hazard lived on Enfield Street in Enfield, several miles from the powder mill, and ran the business until his death on May 7, 1868, at Ascot House in New York City.

His eldest daughter Elvira Hazard Bullock married Alexander Hamilton Bullock, the 26th Governor of Massachusetts. Their daughter, Fanny Bullock Workman, was an explorer and mountain climber who set many record in the Himalayas.
