= Miami Powder Company =

Gunpowder manufacturing company

- Company type: Privately held company
- Industry: Weapons
- Founded: 1855
- Founder: Joseph W. King
- Defunct: 1925
- Headquarters: Goes Station, Ohio, United States
- Products: gunpowder

Miami Powder Company operated a gunpowder manufacturing complex on the Little Miami River at Goes Station, Ohio from 1855 to 1925. Willows growing along the banks of the Little Miami River provided the charcoal required for gunpowder. Production was approximately 75 percent rifle powder and 25 percent blasting powder.

== History ==
Brothers by the name of Chapman built a mill pond dam on the Little Miami River about 1825 to power a mill manufacturing scythes. About 1846 Benjamin Carlton and the Austin brothers of the Austin Powder Company formed the Austin & Carlton Powder Company to convert the mill to the manufacture of gunpowder. Joseph W. King purchased the Austin & Carleton powder mill in 1855 and expanded it as the Miami Powder Company including a steam power plant and employee residences for the company town of Goes Station. In 1872 Miami Powder Company formed the United States Gunpowder Trade Association, popularly known as the powder trust, with American Powder Mills, Austin Powder Company, DuPont, Hazard Powder Company, Laflin & Rand Powder Company, and Oriental Powder Company. In 1877 Joseph King built the King's Great Western Powder Company at Kings Mills, Ohio which later became the Peters Cartridge Company.

A boiler explosion on 1 March 1886 ignited 2500 25-pound (11 kg) kegs of powder in a storehouse which disintegrated killing three men, leaving a crater 10 feet (3.0 m) deep and causing an "earthquake" felt in Columbus and Cincinnati. Two men were killed in a 1920 explosion, and the company closed after a 1925 explosion destroyed several buildings.
