= American Powder Mills =

- Company type: Private
- Industry: chemicals
- Founded: 1883
- Founder: American Powder Company
- Defunct: 1929
- Successor: American Cyanamid
- Headquarters: Boston, Massachusetts, United States
- Products: gunpowder

American Powder Mills (1883–1929) was a Massachusetts gunpowder manufacturing complex on the Assabet River. It expanded to include forty buildings along both sides of the river in the towns of Acton, Concord, Maynard, and Sudbury. Press mills, kernelling mills, glazing mills, and storehouses were dispersed over four-hundred acres to minimize damage during explosions. A narrow gauge railway transferred raw materials and products between the buildings.

== History ==
Nathan Pratt purchased a mill pond dam on the Assabet River and converted the former sawmill to a powder mill in 1835. Pratt sold the mill to the American Powder Company in 1864. The mill manufactured 1,000 pounds (450 kg) of gunpowder per day through the American Civil War. In 1872 American Powder Company joined the United States Gunpowder Trade Association, popularly known as the powder trust, with Austin Powder Company, DuPont, Hazard Powder Company, Laflin & Rand Powder Company, Miami Powder Company, and Oriental Powder Company.

American Powder Company reorganized as American Powder Mills in 1883 with business offices in Boston. The facility was sold to American Cyanamid in 1929, with gunpowder production continuing to 1940. In addition to black powder for blasting and other purposes, APM made smokeless gunpowder for shotgun-using hunters under the brand name "Dead Shot."

Newspaper reports record a number of deadly accidents at the facility. The first explosion, in 1836, in the first year of operation, killed four men. Henry David Thoreau's journal records his observations of another explosion killing three men in 1853. Five men were killed in May 1895 explosion. While the plant was manufacturing gunpowder for the Russian Empire during World War I, a September 4, 1915 explosion was heard as far away as Lowell and Boston. The last three explosions in 1940 ended gunpowder production, and the property passed into W. R. Grace and Company ownership.

The Assabet River dam at the original mill pond site is being used to generate hydroelectricity for municipal Concord. The body of water created by the dam goes by the name Ripple Pond, and is located in Acton and Maynard.
