= List of United States Supreme Court cases, volume 97 =

Supreme Court of the United States
- Interactive map of Supreme Court of the United States
- 38°53′26″N 77°00′16″W
- Established: March 4, 1789; 236 years ago
- Location: Washington, D.C.
- Coordinates: 38°53′26″N 77°00′16″W
- Composition method: Presidential nomination with Senate confirmation
- Authorised by: Constitution of the United States, Art. III, § 1
- Judge term length: life tenure, subject to impeachment and removal
- Number of positions: 9 (by statute)
- Website: supremecourt.gov

This is a list of cases reported in volume 97 of United States Reports, decided by the Supreme Court of the United States in 1878 and 1879, and one from 1877.

== Justices of the Supreme Court at the time of 97 U.S. ==
The Supreme Court is established by Article III, Section 1 of the Constitution of the United States, which says: "The judicial Power of the United States, shall be vested in one supreme Court . . .". The size of the Court is not specified; the Constitution leaves it to Congress to set the number of justices. Under the Judiciary Act of 1789 Congress originally fixed the number of justices at six (one chief justice and five associate justices). Since 1789 Congress has varied the size of the Court from six to seven, nine, ten, and back to nine justices (always including one chief justice).

When the cases in 97 U.S. were decided the Court comprised the following nine members:

Portrait	Justice	Office	Home State	Succeeded	Date confirmed by the Senate (Vote)	Tenure on Supreme Court
	Morrison Waite	Chief Justice	Ohio	Salmon P. Chase	January 21, 1874 (63–0)	March 4, 1874 – March 23, 1888 (Died)
	Nathan Clifford	Associate Justice	Maine	Benjamin Robbins Curtis	January 12, 1858 (26–23)	January 21, 1858 – July 25, 1881 (Died)
	Noah Haynes Swayne	Associate Justice	Ohio	John McLean	January 24, 1862 (38–1)	January 27, 1862 – January 24, 1881 (Retired)
	Samuel Freeman Miller	Associate Justice	Iowa	Peter Vivian Daniel	July 16, 1862 (Acclamation)	July 21, 1862 – October 13, 1890 (Died)
	Stephen Johnson Field	Associate Justice	California	newly created seat	March 10, 1863 (Acclamation)	May 10, 1863 – December 1, 1897 (Retired)
	William Strong	Associate Justice	Pennsylvania	Robert Cooper Grier	February 18, 1870 (No vote recorded)	March 14, 1870 – December 14, 1880 (Retired)
	Joseph P. Bradley	Associate Justice	New Jersey	newly created seat	March 21, 1870 (46–9)	March 23, 1870 – January 22, 1892 (Died)
	Ward Hunt	Associate Justice	New York	Samuel Nelson	December 11, 1872 (Acclamation)	January 9, 1873 – January 27, 1882 (Retired)
	John Marshall Harlan	Associate Justice	Kentucky	David Davis	November 29, 1877 (Acclamation)	December 10, 1877 – October 14, 1911 (Died)

== Citation style ==
Under the Judiciary Act of 1789 the federal court structure at the time comprised District Courts, which had general trial jurisdiction; Circuit Courts, which had mixed trial and appellate (from the US District Courts) jurisdiction; and the United States Supreme Court, which had appellate jurisdiction over the federal District and Circuit courts—and for certain issues over state courts. The Supreme Court also had limited original jurisdiction (i.e., in which cases could be filed directly with the Supreme Court without first having been heard by a lower federal or state court). There were one or more federal District Courts and/or Circuit Courts in each state, territory, or other geographical region.

Bluebook citation style is used for case names, citations, and jurisdictions.

- "C.C.D." = United States Circuit Court for the District of . . .
  - e.g.,"C.C.D.N.J." = United States Circuit Court for the District of New Jersey
- "D." = United States District Court for the District of . . .
  - e.g.,"D. Mass." = United States District Court for the District of Massachusetts
- "E." = Eastern; "M." = Middle; "N." = Northern; "S." = Southern; "W." = Western
  - e.g.,"C.C.S.D.N.Y." = United States Circuit Court for the Southern District of New York
  - e.g.,"M.D. Ala." = United States District Court for the Middle District of Alabama
- "Ct. Cl." = United States Court of Claims
- The abbreviation of a state's name alone indicates the highest appellate court in that state's judiciary at the time.
  - e.g.,"Pa." = Supreme Court of Pennsylvania
  - e.g.,"Me." = Supreme Judicial Court of Maine

== List of cases in 97 U.S. ==
Case Name	Page and year	Opinion of the Court	Concurring opinion(s)	Dissenting opinion(s)	Lower Court	Disposition
Troy v. Evans	1 (1878)	Waite	none	none	C.C.M.D. Ala.	dismissed
Milligan and H. Glue Company v. Upton	3 (1878)	Field	none	none	C.C.D. Mass.	affirmed
Rubber-Coated Harness-Trimming Company v. Welling	7 (1878)	Hunt	none	none	C.C.D.N.J.	reversed
Omaha H. Company v. Wade	13 (1878)	Clifford	none	none	C.C.D. Neb.	affirmed
Boston Beer Company v. Massachusetts	25 (1878)	Bradley	none	none	Mass. Super. Ct.	affirmed
Noyes v. Hall	34 (1878)	Clifford	none	none	C.C.N.D. Ill.	affirmed
Young v. United States	39 (1878)	Waite	none	none	Ct. Cl.	affirmed
Shillaber v. Robinson	68 (1878)	Miller	none	none	C.C.E.D.N.Y.	reversed
Grant v. First National Bank	80 (1878)	Bradley	none	none	C.C.N.D. Ill.	affirmed
Bates County v. Winters	83 (1878)	Hunt	none	Clifford	C.C.W.D. Mo.	reversed
Eldridge v. Hill	92 (1878)	Miller	none	none	C.C.W.D. Mich.	reversed
Warren County v. Marcy	96 (1878)	Bradley	none	none	C.C.N.D. Ill.	affirmed
Laflin and Rand Powder Company v. Burkhardt	110 (1878)	Hunt	none	none	C.C.D. Mass.	affirmed
Union Machine Company v. Murphy	120 (1878)	Clifford	none	none	C.C.E.D. Mo.	reversed
City of Elizabeth v. Pavement Company	126 (1878)	Bradley	none	none	C.C.D.N.J.	reversed
Allis v. Insurance Company	144 (1878)	Miller	none	none	C.C.D. Minn.	affirmed
Wallace v. Loomis	146 (1878)	Bradley	none	none	C.C.S.D. Ala.	affirmed
United States v. Norton	164 (1878)	Waite	none	none	Ct. Cl.	affirmed
Godfrey v. Terry	171 (1878)	Miller	Waite	none	C.C.D.S.C.	reversed
Lamborn v. Dickinson County	181 (1878)	Bradley	none	none	C.C.D. Kan.	affirmed
Ashcroft v. Boston and Lowell Railroad Company	189 (1878)	Clifford	none	none	C.C.D. Mass.	affirmed
McMicken v. United States	204 (1878)	Bradley	none	none	D. La.	affirmed
United States v. Watkins	219 (1878)	Bradley	none	none	D. La.	affirmed
Hyndman v. Roots	224 (1878)	Swayne	none	none	C.C.S.D. Ohio	affirmed
United States v. McKee	233 (1878)	Miller	none	none	Ct. Cl.	reversed
Lilienthal's Tobacco v. United States	237 (1878)	Clifford	none	none	C.C.S.D.N.Y.	affirmed
Macon County v. Shores	272 (1877)	Swayne	none	none	C.C.W.D. Mo.	affirmed
Chaboya v. Umbarger	280 (1878)	Miller	none	none	Cal.	affirmed
United States v. City of Memphis	284 (1878)	Strong	none	none	C.C.W.D. Tenn.	affirmed
City of Memphis v. United States	293 (1878)	Strong	none	none	C.C.W.D. Tenn.	affirmed
City of Memphis v. Brown	300 (1878)	Strong	none	none	C.C.W.D. Tenn.	affirmed
Trust Company v. Sedgwick	304 (1878)	Swayne	none	none	C.C.S.D.N.Y.	reversed
The Virginia Ehrman	309 (1878)	Clifford	none	none	C.C.D. Md.	affirmed
Hurley v. Jones	318 (1878)	Waite	none	none	not indicated	reinstatement denied
Herbert v. Butler	319 (1878)	Bradley	none	none	C.C.E.D.N.Y.	affirmed
The City of Hartford	323 (1878)	Clifford	none	none	C.C.S.D.N.Y.	affirmed
Mutual Life Insurance Company v. Harris	331 (1878)	Strong	none	none	C.C.D. Md.	reversed
American Emigrant Company v. Wright County	339 (1878)	Miller	none	none	C.C.D. Iowa	affirmed
Martin v. Marks	345 (1878)	Miller	none	none	La.	affirmed
Marsh v. Seymour	348 (1878)	Clifford	none	none	multiple	affirmed
Stewart v. Salamon	361 (1878)	Waite	none	Clifford	C.C.S.D. Ga.	dismissed
Arthur v. Moller	365 (1878)	Hunt	none	none	C.C.S.D.N.Y.	affirmed
Western Union Telegraph Company v. Davenport	369 (1878)	Field	none	none	C.C.S.D.N.Y.	affirmed
Pickens County v. Bank of Commerce	374 (1878)	Hunt	none	none	C.C.D.S.C.	affirmed
Work v. Leathers	379 (1878)	Swayne	none	none	C.C.D. La.	affirmed
Burgess v. Salmon	381 (1878)	Hunt	none	none	C.C.E.D. Va.	affirmed
Pettigrew v. United States	385 (1878)	Miller	none	none	C.C.W.D. Tenn.	reversed
City of Nauvoo v. Ritter	389 (1878)	Waite	none	none	C.C.S.D. Ill.	affirmed
Erwin v. United States	392 (1878)	Field	none	none	Ct. Cl.	affirmed
Kihlberg v. United States	398 (1878)	Harlan	none	none	Ct. Cl.	affirmed
Four Packages v. United States	404 (1878)	Clifford	none	none	C.C.S.D.N.Y.	affirmed
United States v. Mora	413 (1878)	Bradley	none	none	C.C.S.D.N.Y.	reversed
Kendig v. Dean	423 (1878)	Miller	none	none	C.C.W.D. Tenn.	reversed
Mimmack v. United States	426 (1878)	Clifford	none	none	Ct. Cl.	affirmed
Stoll v. Pepper	438 (1878)	Waite	none	none	C.C.D. Ky.	affirmed
Settlemier v. Sullivan	444 (1879)	Field	none	Bradley	C.C.D. Or.	affirmed
Hill v. National Bank	450 (1878)	Swayne	none	none	Sup. Ct. D.C.	affirmed
Keith v. Clark	454 (1878)	Miller	none	Waite; Bradley; Harlan	Tenn.	reversed
Spofford v. Kirk	484 (1878)	Strong	none	none	Sup. Ct. D.C.	affirmed
Missouri, Kansas and Texas Railway Company v. Kansas Pacific Railway Company	491 (1878)	Field	none	none	Kan.	affirmed
Patterson v. Kentucky	501 (1879)	Harlan	none	none	Ky.	affirmed
Coleman v. Tennessee	509 (1879)	Field	none	Clifford	Tenn.	reversed
Welch v. Cook	541 (1879)	Hunt	none	none	Sup. Ct. D.C.	affirmed
United States v. Claflin	546 (1878)	Strong	none	none	C.C.S.D.N.Y.	affirmed
Chicago and North Western Railway Company v. Sayles	554 (1878)	Bradley	none	none	C.C.N.D. Ill.	reversed
Gray v. Blanchard	564 (1878)	Waite	none	none	C.C.W.D. Mich.	dismissed
Cook v. Pennsylvania	566 (1878)	Miller	none	none	Pa.	reversed
Hosmer v. Wallace	575 (1879)	Field	none	none	Cal.	affirmed
Newcomb v. Wood	581 (1878)	Swayne	none	none	C.C.N.D. Ohio	affirmed
Gaussen v. United States	584 (1878)	Strong	none	none	C.C.D. La.	affirmed
Ford v. Surget	594 (1878)	Harlan	Clifford	none	Miss.	affirmed
Howland v. Blake	624 (1878)	Hunt	none	none	C.C.E.D. Wis.	affirmed
Davie v. Briggs	628 (1878)	Harlan	none	none	C.C.W.D.N.C.	affirmed
Stacey v. Emery	642 (1878)	Hunt	none	none	C.C.M.D. Tenn.	affirmed
Robertson v. Cease	646 (1878)	Harlan	none	none	C.C.W.D. Tex.	reversed
Barney v. Dolph	652 (1878)	Waite	none	none	Or.	affirmed
Fertilizing Company v. Village of Hyde Park	659 (1878)	Swayne	Miller	Strong	Ill.	affirmed
Union Mutual Life Insurance Company v. Lewis	682 (1879)	Harlan	none	none	C.C.E.D. Mo.	reversed
Mattingly v. District of Columbia	687 (1878)	Strong	none	none	Sup. Ct. D.C.	reversed
Ruch v. City of Rock Island	693 (1878)	Swayne	none	none	C.C.N.D. Ill.	affirmed
Memphis and Charleston Railroad Company v. Gaines	697 (1878)	Waite	none	none	Tenn.	affirmed
