= Wamesit Canal-Whipple Mill Industrial Complex =

Historic district in Massachusetts, United States

- U.S. National Register of Historic Places
- U.S. Historic district
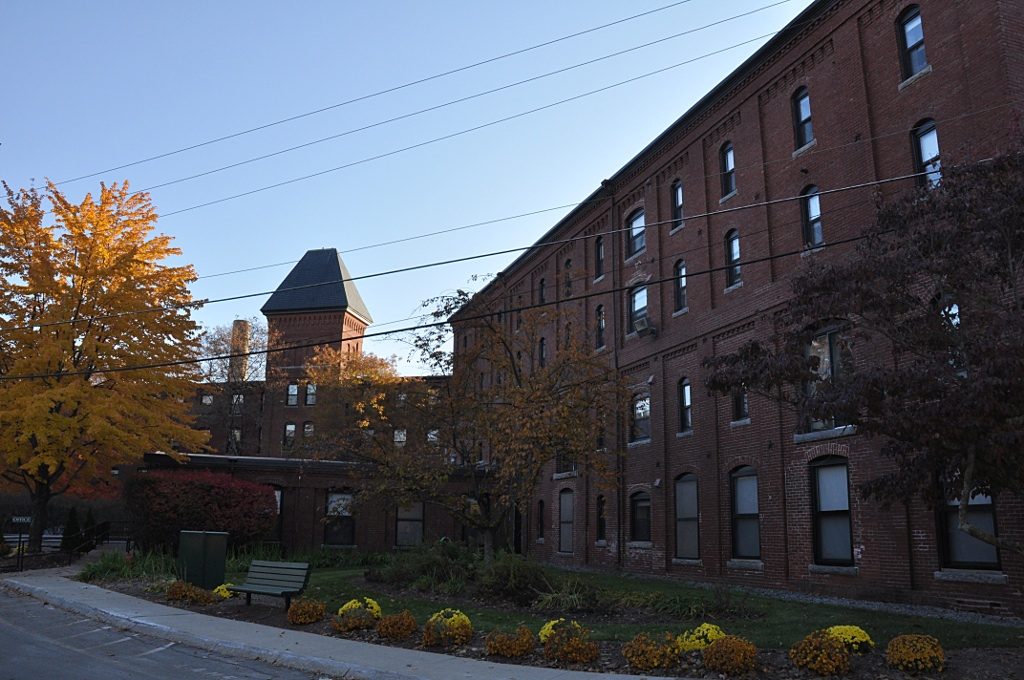

- Location within Massachusetts Location within the United States
- Location: Lowell, Massachusetts
- Coordinates: 42°37′57″N 71°18′3″W
- Built: 1821
- Architect: Loammi Baldwin
- NRHP reference No.: 82001994
- Added to NRHP: August 11, 1982

The Wamesit Canal-Whipple Mill Industrial Complex is a historic mill and canal at 576 Lawrence Street in Lowell, Massachusetts. This industrial area of Lowell, located on the Concord River, underwent a major expansion from a more modest millworks in the mid-19th century by Oliver Whipple, a manufacturer of gunpowder.

== Gunpowder mill ==
Oliver Whipple was a grandson of American Revolutionary War officer James Whipple of Grafton, Massachusetts. Whipple was born in Weathersfield, Vermont, in 1794 and in 1815 he followed the Connecticut River downstream to learn gunpowder manufacturing at the Laflin mill in Southwick, Massachusetts. As the Laflin brothers moved their gunpowder manufacturing operations elsewhere, Whipple moved to east in 1818 to manage a gunpowder mill built by Moses Hale on River Meadow Brook in East Chelmsford upstream of its confluence with the Concord River. River Meadow Brook became known as Hale's Brook. Whipple became Hale's partner after marrying Hale's daughter in 1820. Whipple undertook the construction of a canal along the Concord River to provide power for a number of mills he erected in the area, consulting with engineer Loammi Baldwin Jr. on the matter. Whipple manufactured Boston Gunpowder at the improved mill until 1855 although he began moving gunpowder manufacturing operations to a more remote location on Maine's Cumberland and Oxford Canal in 1833 to minimize risks of accidental explosions and to be closer to supplies of charcoal.

== Preservation ==
The area was further developed in the second half of the 19th century by Benjamin Butler's Wamesit Power Company, which acquired most of Whipple's properties and water rights. Portions of Whipple's gunpowder mill built in the 1820s are among the oldest surviving industrial structures in the city.

The complex was listed on the National Register of Historic Places in 1982.

== See also ==
- National Register of Historic Places listings in Lowell, Massachusetts
