= Mimmack v. United States =

- Supreme Court of the United States

Decided October 1, 1878
- Full case name: Mimmack v. United States
- Citations: 97 U.S. 426 (more)

Holding
- An office become vacant upon the President accepting the officer's resignation. The subsequent revocation of such acceptance does not restore the officer to his office if the initial appointment required the advice and consent of the Senate.

Court membership
- Chief Justice Morrison Waite Associate Justices Nathan Clifford · Noah H. Swayne; Samuel F. Miller · Stephen J. Field; William Strong · Joseph P. Bradley; Ward Hunt · John M. Harlan

Case opinion
- Majority: Clifford, joined by unanimous

Laws applied
- U.S. Const. art. II, § 2, cl. 2

Mimmack v. United States, 97 U.S. 426 (1878), was a decision of the United States Supreme Court concerning the Appointments Clause.
