= United States Gunpowder Trade Association =

American cartel (1872–1912)

The United States Gunpowder Trade Association (also known as the powder trust or the gunpowder trust) was a trade association of major American gunpowder manufacturers which coordinated pricing for gunpowder from 1872 to 1912. The cartel was dissolved through a Supreme Court ruling in 1912, which found it guilty of violating the Sherman Antitrust Act.

Some of the companies that were part of the cartel included Hazard Powder Company, DuPont, Laflin & Rand Powder Company, Delaware Securities Company, Delaware Investment Company, Eastern Dynamite Company, California Investment Company, and Judson Dynamite and Powder Company.
