= Peters Cartridge Company =

Defunct ammo manufacturer in Ohio

- Type: Subsidiary
- Industry: Ammunition; Gunpowder
- Founded: 1887; 139 years ago in Kings Mills, Ohio, United States
- Founder: Gershom Moore Peters
- Defunct: 1944
- Fate: Dissolved
- Parent: King Powder Company
- Peters Cartridge Company
- U.S. National Register of Historic Places
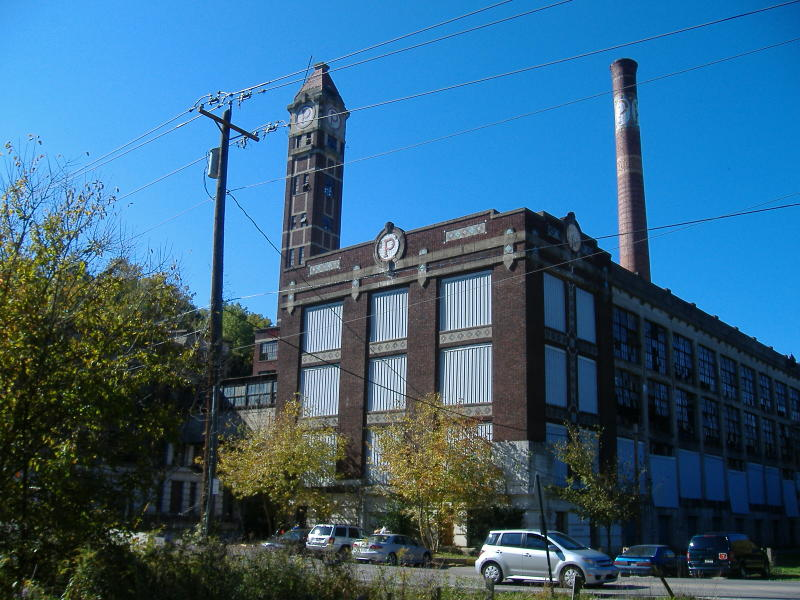
- Peters Cartridge Company

- Location within Ohio Location within the United States
- Location: 1415 Grandin Rd., Kings Mills, Ohio
- Coordinates: 39°21′1″N 84°14′33″W
- Area: 14.2 acres (5.7 ha)
- Built: 1916
- Architect: Schilling VanLeyer & Keough
- Architectural style: Prairie Style
- NRHP reference No.: 85003115
- Added to NRHP: October 10, 1985

The Peters Cartridge Company was a company located along the Little Miami River in Kings Mills, Ohio, which specialized in gunpowder and ammunition production. Founded in 1887 by Gershom Moore Peters, the company supplied military ammunition to various countries during both world wars. Following its demise in 1944, the site was repurposed by Columbia Records and later Seagram, before being abandoned in 1968 and falling into disrepair. Its historic buildings, built in 1916, were added to the National Register of Historic Places in 1985. A brewery and apartment complex themed to the defunct company was constructed on site in 2020, in which many structures were restored and the company's history was placed on display for guests.

== History ==
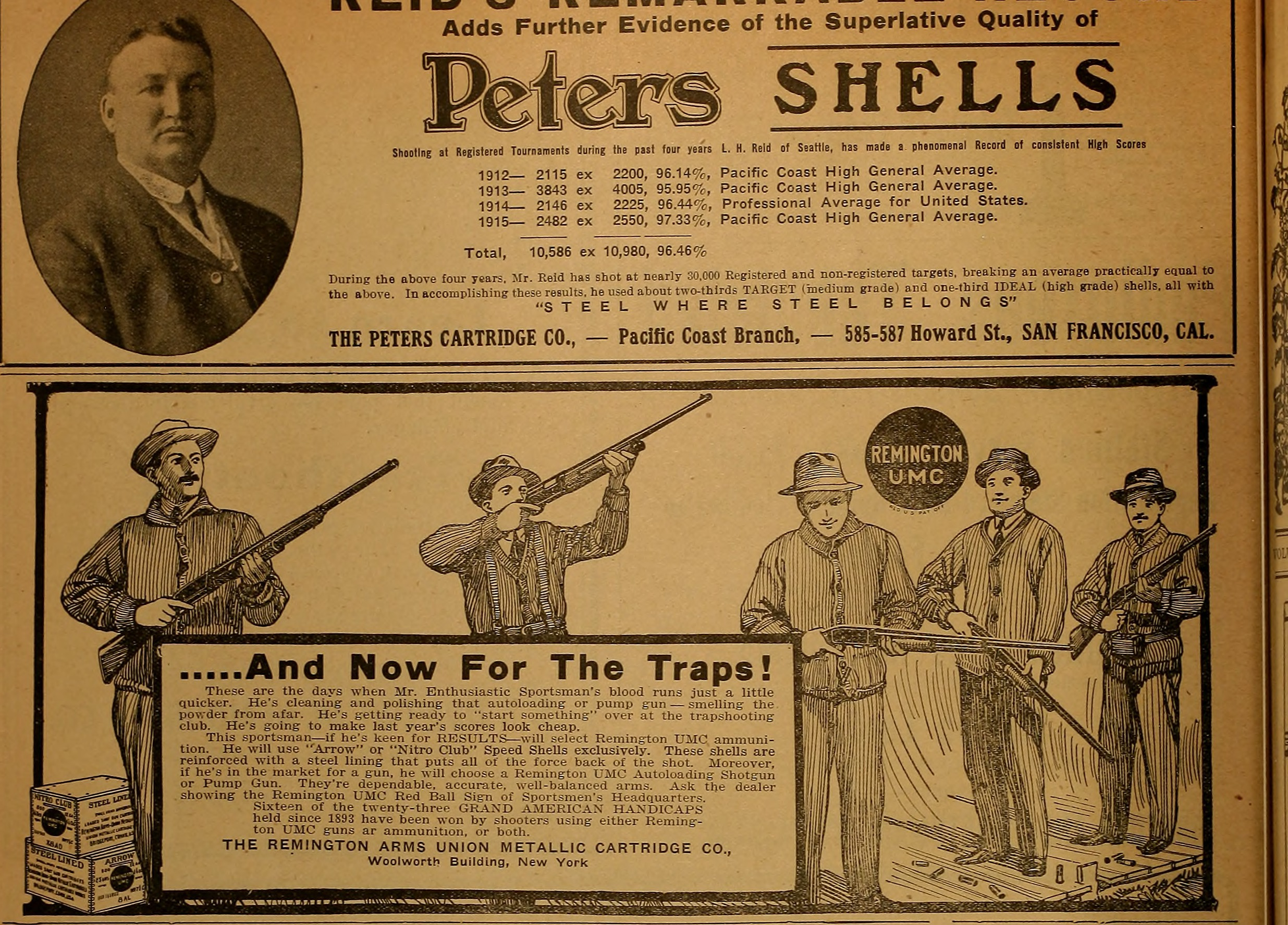
Peters Cartridge advertisement

Joseph Warren King purchased the Austin & Carleton powder mill on the Little Miami River in 1855 and expanded it as the Miami Powder Company including the company town of Goes Station, Ohio. King sold the Miami Powder Company in 1877 to build the Great Western Powder Works with the company town of Kings Mills at a more favorable hydropower location downstream of Goes Station. A wooden dam diverted water into a power canal through the gorge in a narrow valley between steep adjacent hills. Manufacturing facilities were dispersed along the 2-mile (3.2 km) power canal to minimize damage during infrequent explosions. King's son-in-law Gershom Moore Peters began working at the powder mill in 1881 and became president of the powder company when King died in 1885. Peters formed the Peters Cartridge Company at Kings Mills in 1887. Machinery was manufacturing four-thousand cartridges per hour by 1889.

A collision of loaded railway cars being shunted at the powder works on 15 July 1890 triggered an explosion killing twelve people and starting fires destroying the railroad station, the freight house, two Peters Cartridge Company office buildings, the shell factory, the cartridge loading plant, a large warehouse and six employee residences. Wood-frame structures were rebuilt on the opposite side of the river from the old powder works at 1415 Grandin Road, which included a large shot tower completed in 1895. The last wood-frame structures were machine shop building R-3 and shotgun shell loading building R-21 built in 1907. With the approach of World War I the company received large ammunition orders from the Russian Empire and from the United Kingdom of Great Britain and Ireland. Bullet manufacturing building R-6 was built of brick; and money from wartime contracts was used to replace most of the old wooden framed buildings with brick and reinforced concrete structures including the main R-1 building in 1916, the R-17 power house in 1917, metallic cartridge loading building R-2 in 1918, primer assembly building R-9, and the R-23 indoor shooting range and ballistics laboratory in 1919. A taller brick shot tower painted with a large "P" became a local landmark.

Remington Arms purchased the Peters Cartridge Company in 1934. Facilities were expanded during World War II to include the federally owned Kings Mills Ordnance Plant manufacturing military ammunition on an adjacent hill south of the Peters factory complex. Production of military ammunition ended in March 1944, and Remington sold the Kings Mills factory to Columbia Records. Columbia manufactured 78 rpm phonograph records at Kings Mills until 1949. When 45 rpm records became more popular the buildings were subsequently leased to Seagram distillers as warehouse space until 1968, when the site permanently closed. Many of the site's structures, including building R-1 and the brick shot tower, survived into the 21st century. Following its abandonment, the area fell into disrepair and was eventually added to the National Register of Historic Places (NRHP) on October 10, 1985.

=== Redevelopment ===
The United States Environmental Protection Agency (EPA) conducted an investigation between 1994 and 1999 for possible contamination at the site. In 2009, they formally declared the soil contaminated with copper, lead, mercury, boiler ash, and slag, caused by the manufacturing of cartridges. They issued an order calling on DuPont, an American company that owned Remington Arms when the manufacturing took place, to remove the hazardous waste. The site was later designated a Superfund cleanup site when it was added to the EPA's National Priorities List in April 2012. The Superfund designation required that all hazardous waste be removed from the property prior to redevelopment. Cleanup efforts cost $5 million and began in April 2015, taking nearly a month to complete.

A group of local business partners signed a letter of intent in 2017 to renovate the property and open a brewery. Government officials, ranging from the local mayor to members of Congress, spent years acquiring federal approval to remove the Superfund designation. Contractors hired to renovate the property and build the brewery, along with an apartment complex, were eventually able to begin construction in January 2020. The brewery, Cartridge Brewing, opened to the public on October 31, 2020. Its logo and tap handles resemble bullet casings and shotgun shells, respectively, and several beer names carry a military theme. Framed photos honoring the history of the Peters Cartridge Company are on display as well.

== Explosions ==
Explosions happened multiple times in the factory's lifetime. One writer stated, "Later they became of such frequency as to cause little comment, unless they were especially violent."

In 1942, an explosion of unknown origins shattered windows 30 miles away.

== See also ==
- National Register of Historic Places listings in Warren County, Ohio
