= Guasti, California =

Unincorporated community in California, United States

- Unincorporated community
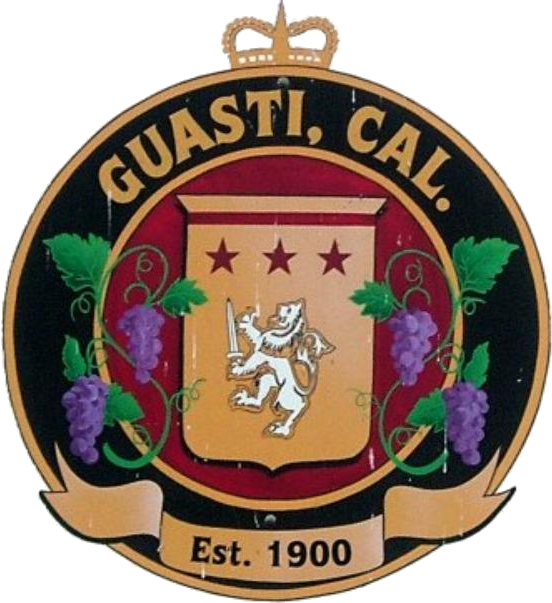
- Seal

- Location within California Location within the United States
- Coordinates: 34°03′54″N 117°35′11″W
- Country: United States
- State: California
- County: San Bernardino
- Elevation: 971 ft (296 m)
- Time zone: UTC-8 (Pacific (PST))
  - Summer (DST): UTC-7 (PDT)
- ZIP code: 91761, 91743
- Area code: 909
- GNIS feature ID: 1660703

Guasti, formerly known as South Cucamonga and Zucker, is a formerly unincorporated community in the Cucamonga Valley region of the Pomona Valley, in southwestern San Bernardino County, California.

== History ==
The area was a former major wine-producing district in the Cucamonga Valley AVA region.

A planter named Tiburcio Tapia received a land grant from the Spanish in 1838, and planted the first domestic grapes of the region there

In 1859, a rancher named John Rains "started a revolution by introducing agriculture on a large scale to replace cattle and sheep raising." His vineyard was purchased by Isaias Hellman in the 1870s, and produced thousands of gallons of port and wine until WWI.

It wasn't until the turn of the century, however, that the area would reach its highest production and development. Secondo Guasti (1859–1927) had arrived in Los Angeles from Italy via Mexico in 1878. He worked in a restaurant, marrying the owner's daughter, and saved enough money to buy a small vineyard in Glendale, CA. Visiting the Cucamonga Valley, he purchased eight square miles and planted a hundred varieties of grapes, which became the foundation for his Italian Vineyard Company.

To accommodate Guasti's workers, a village was established in 1904, featuring a company store, inn, bakery, fire station, hotel, post office, and, at 5000 acres, the world's largest contiguous vineyard. Guasti also built his own 22-mile narrow gauge railroad to service the vineyards and packing houses. One of the latter, "a vast stone building with arched windows and a wooden roof," stands today between the 60 Freeway and Interstate 10. His son, Secondo Guasti Jr, in addition to running the winery, ran the village's tire shops.

By 1917 the Cucamonga-Guasti vineyards spanned over 20,000 acres, Of these, 5,000 acres were being operated by Guasti himself, producing 5 million gallons of wine a year and being advertised as being "The Largest Vineyard in the World."

In 1924, Guasti brought woodworkers and stonemasons from Mexico and Italy to build a church for the village, based on the 17th-century church from his hometown of Asti. It was completed two years later and has been operating since, joining the Diocese of Los Angeles and San Diego in 1935 and the Diocese of San Bernardino in 1978. A bronze bust at the entrance to the church is dedicated to him.

By the 1950s, most of the immigrants and workers in Guasti were no longer Italian but Mexican.

Today, Guasti Wines sells sacramental and altar wines to countries all over the world, through the Joseph Filippi Winery and Vineyards.

The original G. Filippi and Son winery, founded in 1934 by Giovanni Filippi, had grown to over 400 acres by the mid-1960s. Giovanni's grandson Joseph Jr taught for ten years as a professor of Enology and Viticulture as UC Davis. The Filippis have worked to revitalize old vineyards; for instance, in 1967, the Filippi family purchased "California's Oldest Winery," the Thomas Brothers Winery in Rancho Cucamonga. They were also instrumental in getting the Cucamonga Valley recognized as an approved viticulture area, allowing any winery using at least 85% of its grapes from the region to use the valley's name on its label.

A 1973 episode of Columbo was filmed on the north side of the largest stone building.

== Annexation and Development ==
Guasti was annexed into the City of Ontario, California. It is located 3.5 miles (5.6 km) east of downtown Ontario and near the Ontario International Airport.

Guasti is now located in the area of ZIP code 91761, presumably after its annexation into Ontario.

In 2001, the San Diego–based developer Oliver-McMillan purchased 49 acres surrounding the historic Guasti Village and, in cooperation with the city of Ontario and the Ontario Redevelopment Agency, is working to restore historic buildings and develop office buildings, a full service hotel and a walkable entertainment district.
