= Powder mill =

Mill where ingredients of gunpowder are ground and mixed

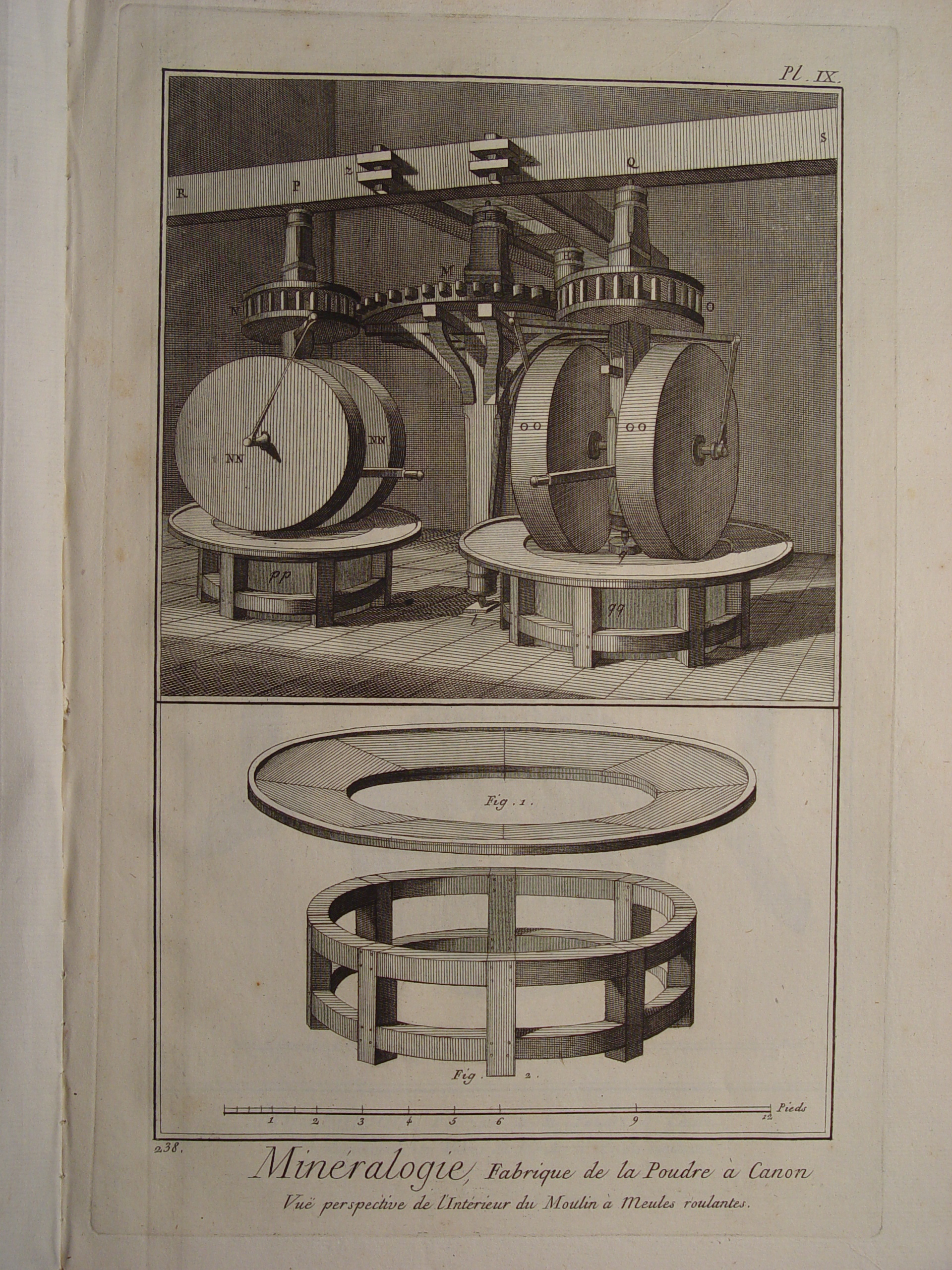
One component of a powder-mill, taken from Encyclopédie, published by Denis Diderot, circa 1770.

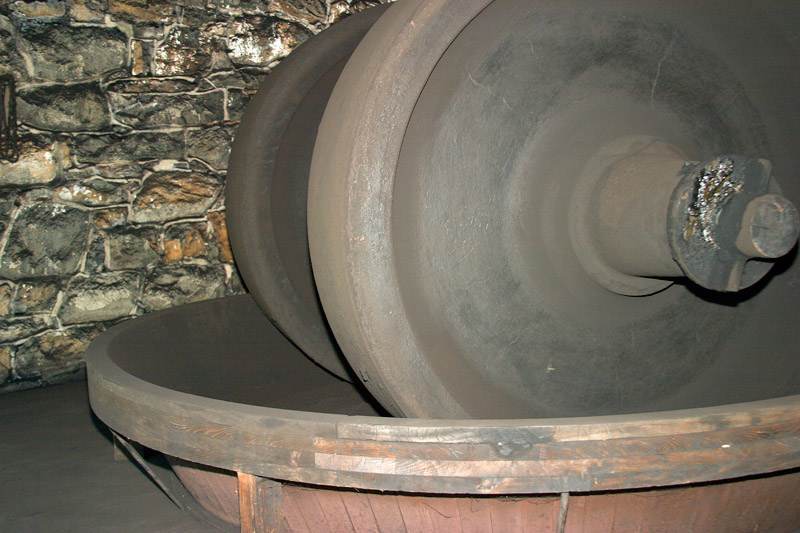
A working example of the drawing above. This is a restored edge-runner mill at Eleutherian Mills.

A powder mill was a mill where gunpowder is made from sulfur, saltpeter and charcoal.

== Milling steps ==
Crude grinding and mixing operations such as the Frankford Powder-Mill of Philadelphia were a cottage industry until the Industrial Revolution brought improved product quality through the following procedures:

- Charcoal was often manufactured nearby from locally available trees, but the heating retorts were typically separated from the other buildings to minimize fire danger. Trees with low value as sources of lumber were debarked, dried, and cut to uniform length to fit into iron retorts with cast iron doors. The retorts were carefully packed to leave as little air space as possible, and the retort doors were closed and sealed with clay to prevent entry of air as the retorts were heated by external fires. Volatile gas generated by the heating process was vented through a small flue at the top of each retort. After the external fires were extinguished, the retorts were allowed to cool before the doors were opened to remove the charcoal.
- High purity sulfur usually required little preparation other than grinding to a powder. Separate grinding mills reduced cool charcoal and sulfur to fine powders.
- Crude saltpeter (KNO_{3}) was dissolved in a pot of boiling water. After boiling, a small amount of floating glue might be added to the hot water to aid skimming off floating impurities. The hot solution was then carefully decanted to avoid suspending insoluble solid impurities settled to the bottom of the pot. The hot decanted liquid was distributed into shallow wooden vats where evaporative cooling would remove excess water. Purified potassium nitrate recrystallized while the cooling solution was gently agitated with broad hoes to prevent formation of large crystals.
- Powdered sulfur and charcoal were combined in appropriate ratios with moist saltpeter crystals, and the moist paste was mixed and compacted by kneading beneath heavy rotating wheels in a press mill.
- The compressed cake was transferred to a corning mill or kernelling mill to be cut into pieces of approximately correct size by bronze- or zinc-toothed wheels.
- Kernelling mill products were sorted by size using leather sieves. Oversize product was returned to the kernelling mill, while undersize product was returned to the press mill.
- Sorted kernels of desired size were dried and mixed with graphite to be tumbled in glazing mill barrels. Graphite coating reduced the tendency of grains to stick together in storage.
- Glazed product was typically packaged in wooden kegs. Filled kegs were transported away from the mill as soon as possible to a powder magazine for wholesale distribution. The potential for destructive energy release from powder magazine accidents required the magazines to be distant from both the powder mill and other places of business or habitation.

== Explosions ==
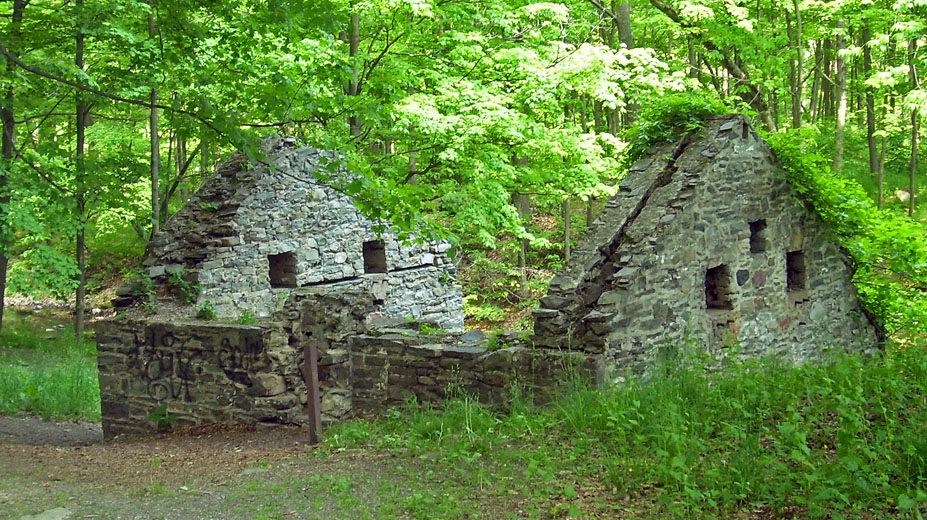
This former Laflin & Rand powder mill building illustrates the protective stone walls on three sides after the weaker wooden back wall and roof have rotted away.

Gunpowder is very easily ignited by static electricity or lightning strikes, and most powder mills experienced occasional accidental explosions. Powder mill explosions typically destroyed an entire building and killed those working in the vicinity of the building. Explosions might throw flaming debris which could ignite other buildings. Successful mills were typically built as an arrangement of separate buildings to minimize the loss from any single building explosion. Buildings were separated by enough distance to minimize the risk of being damaged by an explosion in an adjacent building. Buildings were usually built of stone with one weak wooden wall and roof to direct the force and debris from an accidental explosion toward a river or an open field.

== Power supply ==
Powder mills were originally powered by windmills, water mills or horse mills. Despite later availability of steam engines, the older power sources did not require a fire to generate steam, and avoided the possibility of sparks which might ignite the gunpowder. Some 20th-century powder mills used electric power. Before the availability of safe electrical power, some of the most successful mills were built along rivers where water could be distributed through a power canal to individual buildings and intermediate products could be floated from one building to the next. The power canal offered a supply of firefighting water, and the adjacent river was a relatively safe direction to focus explosion debris. Where water transport was impractical, intermediate products were often transported in wagons pulled by draft animals. The wagons were often built entirely of wood held together with wooden pegs, and draft animals were usually unshod to avoid sparks from steel shoes or nails.

== In the United States ==
The 1810 census reported 208 powder mills in the United States. In 1802, the DuPont family started their industrial enterprises in the United States by building the Eleutherian Mills on the Brandywine Creek in Delaware. Four mills were manufacturing 69 percent of United States gunpowder when gunpowder production peaked during the American Civil War. They were the DuPont mill, the Hazard Powder Company of Hazardville, Connecticut, the Oriental Powder Company of Windham, Maine, and the Laflin Powder Company of Newburgh, New York. The Confederate Powderworks of Augusta, Georgia produced 6,000 tonnes of gunpowder from 1862 to 1865, but was dismantled after the war. The Laflin company merged into the Laflin & Rand Powder Company after the war, and with the other three large northern mills formed the United States Gunpowder Trade Association in 1872 including the American Powder Mills of Maynard, Massachusetts, the Austin Powder Company of Glenwillow, Ohio, and the Miami Powder Company of Goes Station, Ohio. Most smaller mills were unable to compete with this trade association, popularly known as the powder trust; although regionally important mills including the California Powder Works of Santa Cruz, California, the Equitable Powder Company of East Alton, Illinois, and the Great Western Powder Works of Kings Mills, Ohio successfully transitioned to manufacture of smokeless powder cartridges. As smokeless powder and high explosives replaced gunpowder for most purposes, DuPont became the major manufacturer of United States gunpowder until discontinuing production in 1971. Subsequent production for use in pyrotechnics and antique firearms has been undertaken by smaller firms whose operations are often ended by the persistent hazard of accidental explosions.

== Europe ==
Notable European mills include:

- Ballincollig Royal Gunpowder Mills, County Cork, Ireland
- Faversham explosives industry, Faversham, England
- Grenelle Mill - France
- Poudrerie nationale de Vonges, Vonges, Côte-d'Or, France
- Waltham Abbey Royal Gunpowder Mills, Waltham Abbey, Essex, England
