= Italian Vineyard Company =

California vineyard established 1900

The Italian Vineyard Company was a 5,000 acre vineyard established by Secondo Guasti in 1900. The vineyard was located in a town named Zucker in the Cucamonga Valley, and by 1910 the town's name was officially changed to Guasti.

The Italian Vineyard Company eventually became recognized as one of the leaders of the grape growing and wine producing industry in California. By 1917, Guasti had succeeded in creating one of the largest vineyards in the world that produced nearly 5 million gallons of wine per year.

== History ==
Secondo Guasti arrived in Los Angeles, California in 1883, and in just four years he began to produce wines for local Los Angeles restaurants. Eventually, Guasti's love for wine led him to establishing the Guasti Winery, and by the late 1890s Guasti was recognized as one of the key producers of wine in Los Angeles.

According to legend, Guasti arrived to the Cucamonga Valley in the early 20th century and dug twenty-four feet into the earth, uncovered water, and immediately recognized that he found an opportunity to expand his wine business. In 1900, Guasti took a risk and organized a group of investors to purchase eight square miles of land in Cucamonga, California and founded the Italian Vineyard Company. In order to construct and run the vineyard, Guasti, with the help of the Italian consul in Los Angeles, encouraged Italian immigrants to come work for him in Cucamonga Valley. As a result, Guasti created his own town for the newly imported Italian workers that included institutions such as a fire station, school, market, bakery, boarding house, and a doctor's office.

In 1910, Guasti built a mansion in the West Adams district in Los Angeles. Located at 3500 W. Adams Boulevard, the home is Los Angeles Historic-Cultural Monument No. 478. After his death, the family sold the home to choreographer Busby Berkley.
