= Schaghticoke Powder Company =

Former powder mill in New York

Coordinates: 42.89736°N 73.5730735°W

- Type: Private
- Industry: Chemicals
- Genre: Industrial Manufacturing
- Founded: 1813
- Founder: Josiah Masters; Nicholas Masters
- Defunct: 1928
- Fate: Merger
- Successor: DuPont de Nemours & Company
- Headquarters: Schaghticoke, New York, United States
- Number of locations: Valley Falls, New York
- Key people: Josiah Masters; Nicholas Masters
- Products: Gunpowder

Schaghticoke Powder Company was a powder mill located in Rensselaer County, New York in the village of Schaghticoke. The powder mill was founded by Josiah Masters and Nicholas Masters in 1813 for the supply of gunpowder during the War of 1812.

The Schaghticoke Powder Works was located on the south banks of the Hoosick River approximately a half mile southeast of the Schaghticoke village. The powder works was established on one hundred acres and developed with twenty separate buildings processing special grades of gunpowder. The Schaghticoke Powder Works manufactured sixty thousand powder kegs or one million and five thousand pounds of powder per year. By 1893, the Schaghticoke Works mill was recognize as one of the oldest gunpowder mills in the United States manufacturing various propellant grades for eighty years in the Hudson River Valley.

== See also ==
- Daniel D. Tompkins
- History of gunpowder
- Mohicans
