= Kings Mills, Ohio =

- Census-designated place
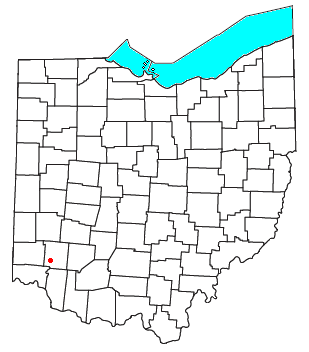
- Location of Kings Mills, Ohio
- Coordinates: 39°21′32″N 84°14′52″W
- Country: United States
- State: Ohio
- County: Warren
- Elevation: 778 ft (237 m)

Population (2020)
  - Total: 1,336
- Time zone: UTC-5 (Eastern (EST))
  - Summer (DST): UTC-4 (EDT)
- ZIP code: 45034
- Area code: 513
- GNIS feature ID: 2612136

Kings Mills is a census-designated place in the northeastern corner of Deerfield Township of Warren County, Ohio, United States, on the western shore of the Little Miami River. The population was 1,336 at the 2020 census.

== History ==
Another town, Gainsboro, was platted on the site of present-day Kings Mills in 1815, but it did not prosper. Kings Mills was established in 1884 as a company town for the King Powder Company, and the Peters Cartridge Company which ceased operations in 1944.

Kings Mills was formerly the home of the College Football Hall of Fame, which moved to South Bend, Indiana in 1995.

== Geography ==
Kings Mills is located along I-71 twenty miles northeast of Cincinnati, less than a mile east of Mason, two miles southwest of South Lebanon, two and one-half miles north of Fosters, and two miles west of Hopkinsville.

The community is in the Mason (513) telephone exchange and is served by the Kings Mills/Kings Island post office (45034).

The Little Miami Scenic Trail, which runs from Milford to Spring Valley, passes by the community on the eastern shore of the Little Miami River in the former Little Miami Railroad right-of-way.

Kings Island amusement park and Great Wolf Lodge indoor water park are immediately south of the community in Mason.

== Education ==
Kings Mills is located in the Kings Local School District.

== Notable people ==
- Leelah Alcorn, transgender girl whose suicide attracted international attention
- Bryan Volpenhein, rower and Olympian
