= Oriental Powder Company =

Oriental Powder Company was a gunpowder manufacturer with mills located on the Presumpscot River in Gorham and Windham, Maine. The company was one of the four largest suppliers to Union forces through the American Civil War.

== History ==
The Presumpscot River dropped 16 feet at Gambo Falls where the river formed the border between the towns of Windham and Gorham. Sebago Lake formed a large natural reservoir upstream of Gambo giving the falls an unusually reliable water supply with comparatively minor flow peaking from storm runoff. Early European settlers built a sawmill powered by the falls. In 1824 the sawmill was converted to a powder mill by Edmund Fowler and Lester Laflin. Their Gorham Powder Company became known among the local population as the Gambo powder mills. Lester Laflin was a grandson of American Revolutionary War gunpowder manufacturer Matthew Laflin. The Laflin family manufactured gunpowder in Massachusetts for several generations. When Lester came east to Maine, his first cousins traveled west to build gunpowder mills in New York and Chicago. Lester, his partner, and their mill foreman drowned on Sebago Lake on 22 June 1827. Following an explosion killing seven employees on 19 July 1828, the Gambo Falls mill was enlarged by Oliver Whipple concurrently with construction of locks for the Cumberland and Oxford Canal. Whipple had been manufacturing gunpowder in Lowell, Massachusetts since 1818. The new canal provided reliable transportation from Portland harbor for sulfur from Sicily and saltpeter from India and from Sebago Lake for charcoal and lumber from forests to the north. Whipple's Gambo mill used the lumber to manufacture kegs holding as much as 25 pounds of powder. Kegs of gunpowder were shipped to Portland in canal boats when possible, but moved in horse-drawn sleighs when the canal was frozen. Canal boats carried about 25 tons, and sometimes sailed all the way to Boston when weather was favorable.

After plant explosions killed one employee each in 1835, 1847, 1849, 1850, and 1851, a major explosion on 12 October 1855 killed seven employees, including Whipple's brother and son, injured five more and destroyed a canal boat and parts of the mill. Manufacture of gunpowder in response to orders avoided the hazard of storing powder inventories until orders were received, but required water power on demand. The canal lock system controlled outflow from Sebago Lake; and, as a shipper interested in the well-being of its customer, canal management was receptive to regulating water releases to meet needs of the powder mill.

== Oriental Powder Company organized ==
Gilbert Grafton Newhall of Salem, Massachusetts, purchased the property in early 1855 to manufacture powder for Crimean War belligerents, and organized Oriental Powder Company to repair the damage and construct new facilities. A charcoal house, saltpeter refinery, wheel mills, press mills, kernelling mills, glazing mills, and storehouses were dispersed along both banks of the river and canal for a mile upstream of Gambo to minimize damage during infrequent explosions. Charcoal was manufactured from dried, debarked alder packed into cast iron retorts. Charcoal was made from willow, poplar or maple when alder was unavailable. Crude saltpeter was dissolved in hot water in kettles holding as much as 600 U.S. gallons (2,300 L). Impurities were skimmed from the surface or settled to the bottom so a hot, saturated solution could be decanted for crystallization. Moist saltpeter crystals were mixed with appropriate amounts of sulfur and charcoal by heavy rotating wheels to form a cake which was then cut unto smaller pieces in bronze- or zinc-toothed kernelling mills. The kernels were sieved into desired sizes and dried prior to being tumbled with graphite which reduced tendency for the finished grains to stick together during storage. Intermediate products were transported between the dispersed production and storage facilities in wooden wheelbarrows constructed with no iron parts and pushed over plank walkways by workmen going barefoot in the summer or wearing shoes without iron nails during colder weather. Newhall gave his name to a small company town of employee residences built near Gambo Falls. Company offices were in Portland, Maine to avoid business disruption by the periodic explosions at the manufacturing facilities.

By 1860, Oriental was one of four companies making 69% of United States gunpowder sales. The larger DuPont and Hazard Powder Company mills each provided approximately one-third of the Union gunpowder supply for the civil war. The fourth major supplier was Lester Laflin's cousins' mill which later evolved into the early smokeless powder manufacturer Laflin & Rand. The DuPont mill was uncomfortably close to the battle line and considered potentially vulnerable to sabotage from southern sympathizers in the slave state of Delaware.

The federal government purchased as much powder as Oriental Powder Company could produce through the war years. Wartime production included large cast hexagonal powder grains for Rodman guns; and an 8-inch (20 cm) Columbiad was installed at Gambo to test this specialized powder. Production increased to 1250 tons per year as accidental explosions killed one employee on 8 July 1861, three on 7 July 1862, and another on 14 November 1863. Demand for gunpowder declined when the civil war ended, but picked up briefly during the Franco-Prussian War and Russo-Turkish War. Oriental Powder Company was ranked 4th (after DuPont, Laflin & Rand, and Hazard) among the six companies of the United States Gunpowder Trade Association popularly known as the powder trust.

== Decline ==
Canal boats were unable to compete with rail service and the canal was unused after the Portland and Ogdensburg Railway reached Gambo Falls (by then called Newhall) in 1871. Oriental Powder Company employees assumed control of the former canal dam at Sebago Lake when the canal locks ceased operations; but water users in Westbrook, Maine, were unsatisfied with timing of water releases. Court action was initiated in January 1877, following a drought. Legal maneuvering continued for several months between Oriental Powder Company and Westbrook water users while water releases were controlled by whichever side mustered a larger number of employees at the dam. Legislation enacted in February 1878 effectively passed control of water releases from Sebago Lake to water users in Westbrook.

As smaller Maine gunpowder mills went out of business following the civil war, Oriental Powder Company acquired the assets of the North Buckfield Powder Mill in 1880, the Warren Powder Mill in 1887, and the Camden Powder Mill in 1892. Machinery was salvaged from these mills, and a subsidiary Oriental Powder Company of Pennsylvania began manufacturing rock blasting powder at Fairchance, Pennsylvania in 1902. As telegraph became available for sales communications, the powder company reduced the risk to manufacturing facilities by building magazines for powder inventories near distant rail distribution centers like Chicago and Salt Lake City.

Local supplies of charcoal and keg staves became more expensive as forest resources were exhausted. The rock blasting powder market for mining and railroad construction fluctuated with financial panics. The Newhall mill ceased operations on 1 June 1893 as smokeless powder and dynamite became preferred for traditional uses of gunpowder. Eastern Dynamite Company was formed in 1895 and began manufacturing dynamite at Newhall. Four employees died in three fatal explosions through the final decade of explosives manufacture. March 19, 1904, was the last of 32 recorded blasts claiming 46 lives along the river. Mill operations after the 1904 explosion were limited to manufacturing wood flour shipped elsewhere for mixing with nitroglycerine to form dynamite. Production of wood flour continued into the 1950s after ownership passed to the Atlas Powder Company in 1912. The civil war Columbiad remained at Newhall until scrapped during World War II.
