= Goes Station, Ohio =

Unincorporated community in Ohio, U.S.

Coordinates: 39°46′00″N 83°55′01″W

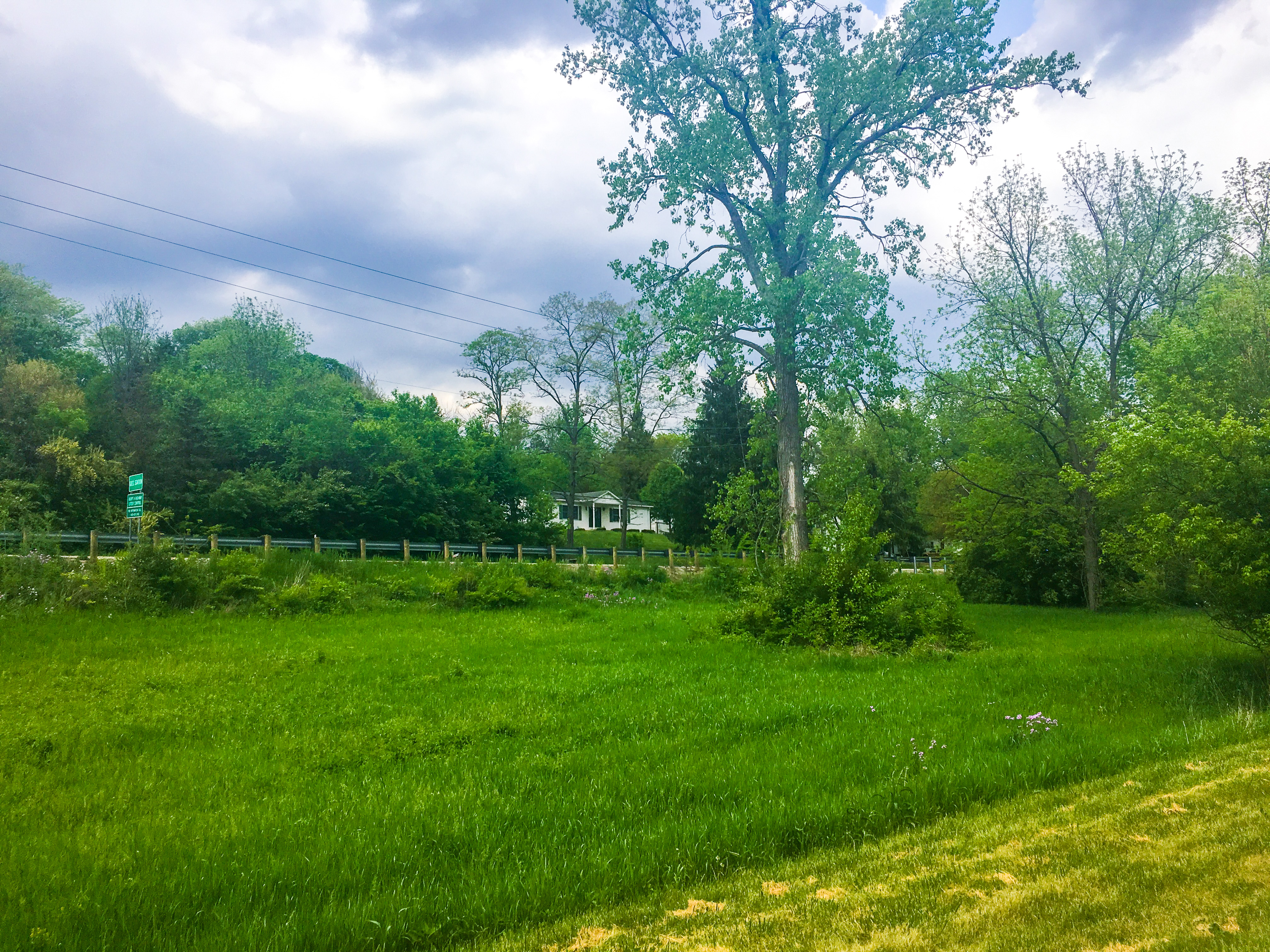
Goes Station as seen from the Little Miami Scenic Trail, May 2018

Goes Station (also known as Goes) is a small unincorporated community in northern Xenia Township, Greene County, Ohio, United States. It sits at the intersection of Snively Road and U.S. Route 68 between Xenia and Yellow Springs.

The community is part of the Dayton Metropolitan Statistical Area.

== History ==
A post office called Goes Station was established in 1872, the name was changed to Goes in 1894, and the post office closed in 1932. Goe was the last name of a local settler. Goes Station was a depot on the Springfield and Xenia Railroad, which was built to serve as the company town of the Miami Powder Company on the Little Miami River.
