= Austin Cartridge Company =

- Company type: Private
- Industry: Weapons
- Founded: 1895
- Founder: Austin Powder Company
- Defunct: 1907
- Successor: Western Cartridge Company
- Headquarters: Glenwillow, Ohio, United States
- Products: Ammunition

Austin Cartridge Company was an Austin Powder Company subsidiary manufacturing cartridge ammunition for small arms. The company made shotgun shells and rimfire cartridges from 1895 until purchased by Western Cartridge Company in 1907.

== History ==
Austin Powder Company was founded in 1833 by brothers Daniel, Alvin, Lorenzo, Henry, and Linus Austin of Wilmington, Vermont. After exploring the market for gunpowder on the western frontier, they built and operated a gunpowder mill at Old Forge on the Cuyahoga River near Akron, Ohio. Early production was largely used as blasting powder for coal mining but some was sold as sporting rifle powder. In 1884 the company became the exclusive supplier of gunpowder for shotgun shells manufactured by Chamberlain Cartridge Company.

Austin Powder Company built the company town of Glenwillow, Ohio in 1892, and established the Austin Cartridge Company there in 1895 manufacturing Crack Shot, Club Sporting, and Champion Ducking shotgun shells. The Union Cap and Chemical Company was formed in 1900 as a joint venture of Austin Cartridge Company and Western Cartridge Company to manufacture blasting caps, primers, and .22 and .32 caliber rimfire cartridges. The Union Cap and Chemical Company trademark was a Maltese cross and a UCC headstamp appeared on the rimfire cartridges. These were the first .22 rimfire cartridges manufactured by Western Cartridge Company. Austin Cartridge Company was sold to Western Cartridge Company in 1907 as Austin Powder Company reorganized to focus on production of blasting explosives. Western Cartridge Company used the Maltese cross trade mark until replacing it with a diamond trade mark during World War I.
