= Hazard Powder Company =

American manufacturer of gunpowder and explosives

The Hazard Powder Company is a former American manufacturer of gunpowder and explosives. It was located in Hazardville within the town of Enfield, Connecticut.

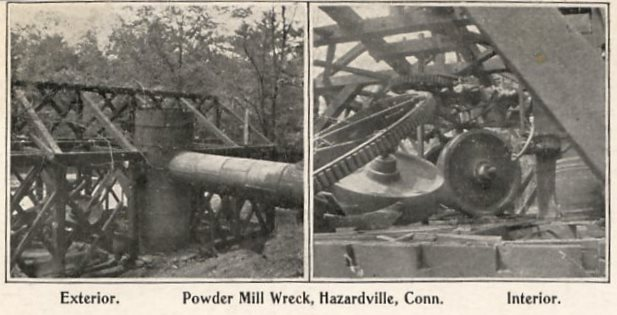
Powder mill wreckage, c. 1906

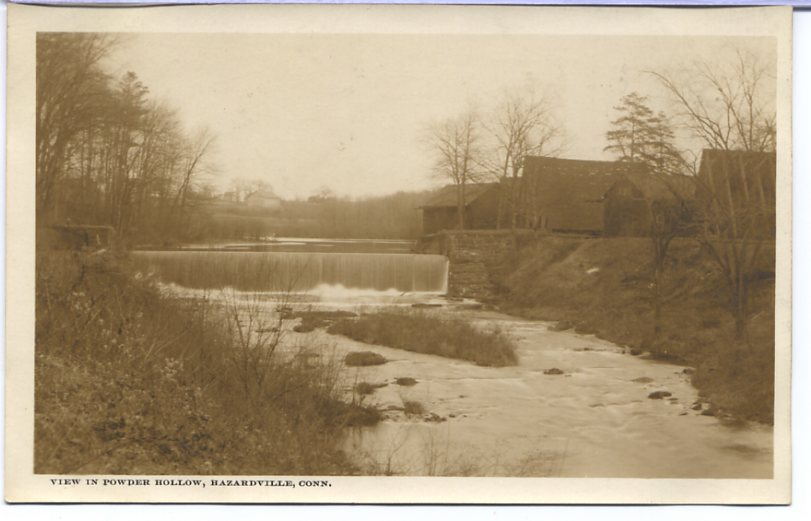
Powder Hollow, c. 1910

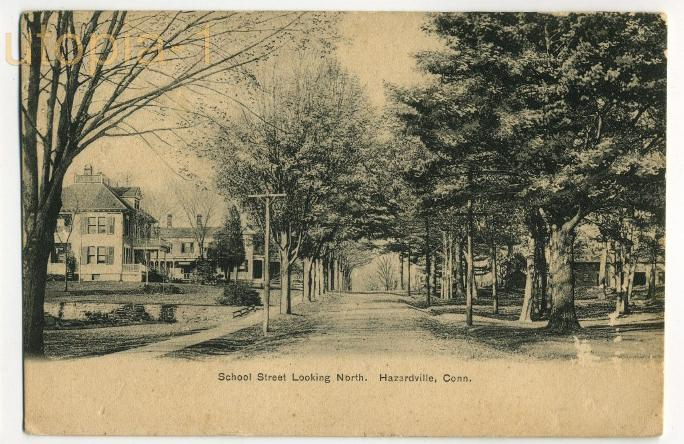
School Street, looking north, c. 1910

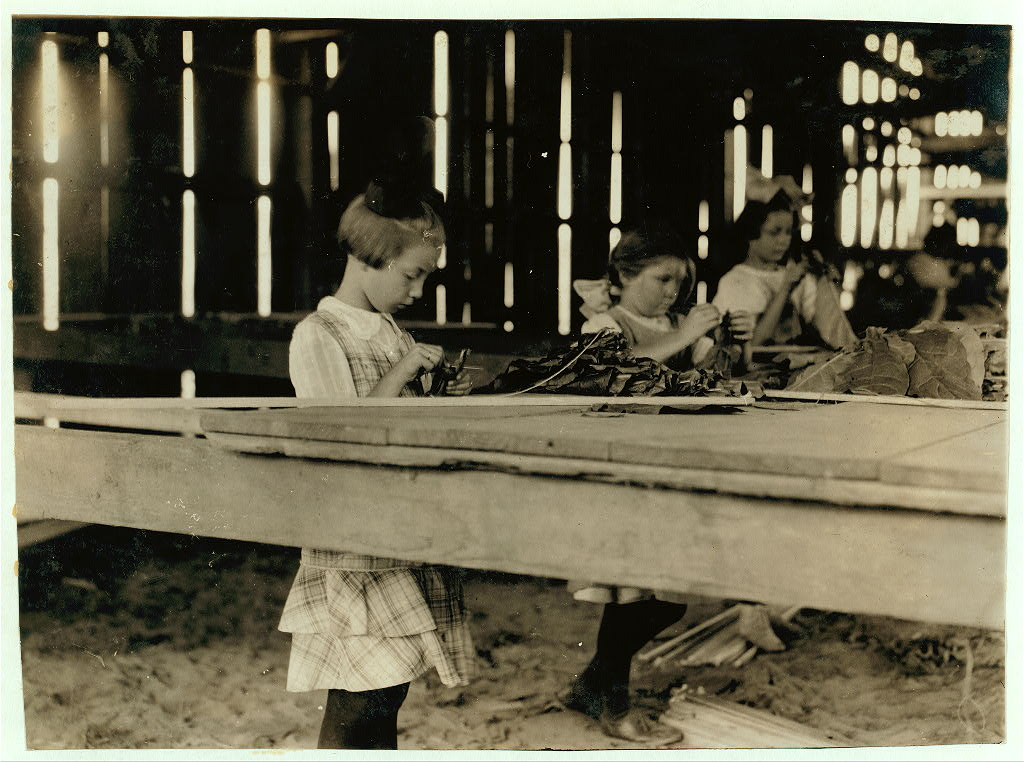
Child laborers in a tobacco shed at Hawthorn Farm in Hazardville, 1917. Photo by Lewis Hine.

== History ==
The company was founded on the Scantic River in 1835 by Allen Loomis in an area then known as Powder Hollow, with the construction of a small gunpowder mill. A company called Loomis, Denslow and Company, named for Loomis and his business partner, was established the following year. The company manufactured powder from saltpeter, sulfur, and charcoal.

Employees lived in a company town named Hazardville, which took its name from Colonel Augustus George Hazard (1802-1868), who bought into the company in 1837 and eventually built it to become a major producer of gunpowder. The company changed its name to Loomis, Hazard & Company in 1837, and became the Hazard Powder Company in 1843 when Hazard bought Loomis' share of the business.

Production increased over the years in response to the needs of the U.S. military for gunpowder during the Mexican–American War, demand for blasting powder during the California Gold Rush of 1849, and the Crimean War, when the Hazard Powder Company supplied both Britain and Russia with gunpowder, shipping a total of 500 tons to Britain. During the American Civil War, the mill was one of the three chief sources of gunpowder for the Union forces, producing up to 12,500 lb (5,700 kg) a day.

At its peak, the Hazard Powder Company operated in 125 buildings occupying hundreds of acres of land. It had 25 water wheels and three steam engines along a mile of Scantic River frontage. There were additional mills in East Hartford and Canton. The business declined after the Civil War. However, Hazardville still had a relatively large population of 1,500 in the 1890s.

Hazard Powder was one of the three largest (with DuPont and Laflin & Rand) among the six companies of the United States Gunpowder Trade Association (popularly known as the powder trust). DuPont gained majority stock control of the company in 1876 after Colonel Hazard died in 1868. The plant became part of Hercules Powder Company when DuPont assets were divided in 1912 under provisions of the Sherman Antitrust Act, and it closed permanently after a major explosion on January 14, 1913, destroyed much of the plant.
