= Laflin & Rand Powder Company =

Gunpowder and early smokeless powder manufacturer

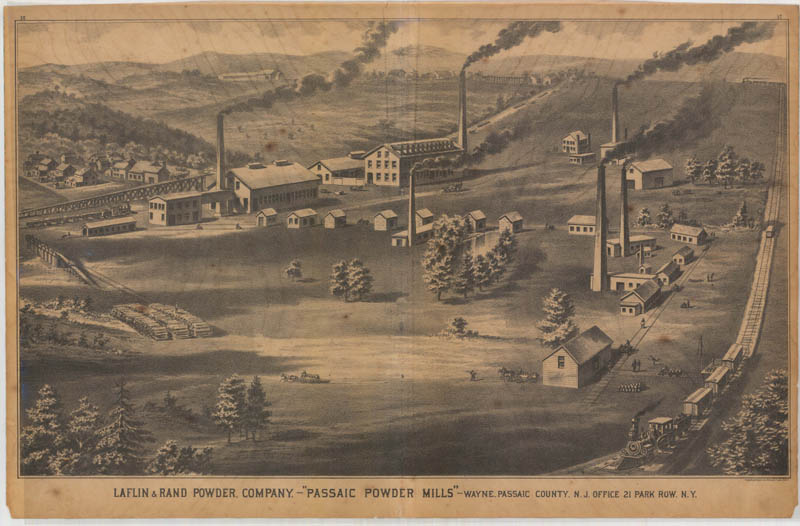
Laflin & Rand's Passaic Powder Mills in Passaic County, New Jersey

Laflin & Rand Powder Company was a gunpowder and early smokeless powder manufacturer notable for producing the smokeless powder used by United States Army infantry rifles from 1896 to 1908, which included the period of development of the M1903 Springfield rifle and .30-06 Springfield cartridge.

== Formation ==
Matthew Laflin manufactured potassium nitrate for the Massachusetts militia during the American Revolutionary War and built a gunpowder mill in Southwick, Massachusetts, after the war. After Laflin's death in 1810, his grandchildren expanded the family business with two mills in New York and one in Wisconsin. These mills produced gunpowder for the Union forces through the American Civil War. Laflin Powder Company was incorporated in 1866 to consolidate operations to compete successfully for the reduced gunpowder demand after the war. Laflin Powder Company further consolidated gunpowder manufacturing around the Orange Mill Historic District near Newburgh, New York, by merging with the competing Smith & Rand Powder Company on 24 August 1869 to form the Laflin & Rand Powder Company of New York City, with Albert Rand as president.

== History ==
In 1872 Laflin & Rand formed the United States Gunpowder Trade Association (popularly known as the powder trust) with DuPont, Hazard Powder Company, and three smaller gunpowder manufacturers. DuPont and Laflin & Rand jointly established the Repauno Chemical Company in 1880, the Hercules Powder Company in 1882, and the Eastern Dynamite Company in 1895. Ignition of gunpowder at the former Rand Company Fairchance, Pennsylvania, powder mill caused a series of seven explosions killing 19 people on 9 September 1905. Decreasing demand for the older powder caused Laflin & Rand to abandon the ruins rather than rebuild.

== Smokeless powder ==
Smokeless powder became a threat to traditional United States gunpowder markets in 1893. Winchester Repeating Arms Company began loading sporting ammunition with smokeless powder manufactured by the Anglo-American Explosives Company; and the United States Army published smokeless powder specifications for the new Krag–Jørgensen service rifle. Laflin & Rand negotiated a license to produce Alfred Nobel's patented Ballistite smokeless powder adopted by many European military forces; but the U.S. Army selected Ruby smokeless powder produced by the newly formed Leonard Smokeless Powder Company. Rather than pay the required royalties to manufacture Ballistite, Laflin & Rand loaned the financially troubled Leonard company $30,000 to reorganize as the American Smokeless Powder Company. U.S. Army Lieutenant Garland Whistler assisted American Smokeless Powder Company factory superintendent Henry Aspinwall in formulating an improved powder. They reduced the nitroglycerine content from 58% to 30%; and the extruded formulation, named W.A. in recognition of their work, was cut into black perforated discs 0.08 inches (2.0 mm) in diameter and 0.045 inches (1.1 mm) thick. W.A. .30 caliber smokeless powder was the standard for United States military service rifles from 1896 until 1908. When the American Smokeless Powder Company plant was destroyed by an explosion in 1898, Laflin & Rand took over the company and rebuilt the plant in Haskell, New Jersey (named for Laflin & Rand president Jonathan Haskell.) The Haskell plant became Laflin & Rand's primary smokeless powder factory producing not only military W.A. powder, but sporting powders including Bullseye pistol powder (introduced in 1898 using small, irregular particles removed by screening runs of larger grained powders), Lightning powder for lever-action sporting rifles (introduced in 1899), and shotgun powders Infallible and Unique (introduced in 1900).

== DuPont control ==
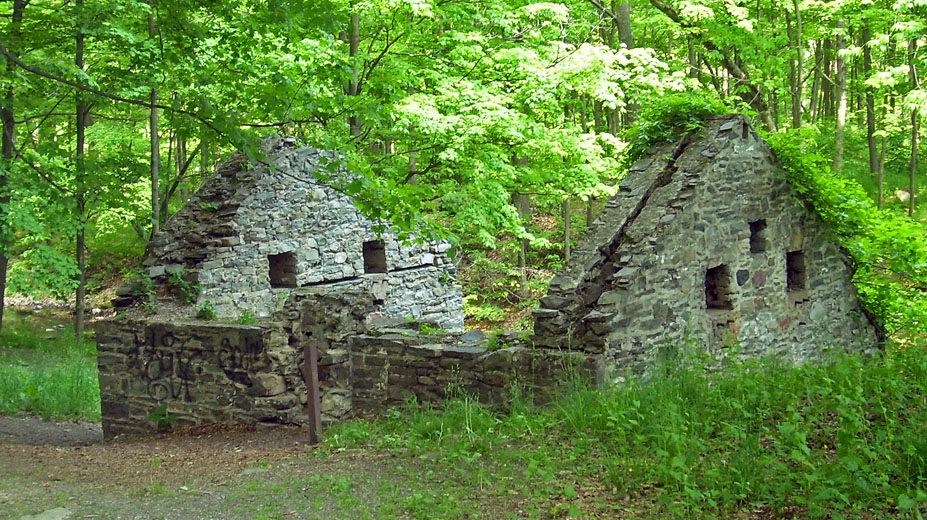
Ruins of several buildings from the Laflin & Rand gunpowder mill in New York.

Laflin & Rand and DuPont together commanded over two-thirds of the United States explosives and gunpowder industry by 1900. In October 1902 DuPont purchased Laflin & Rand and operated the company as a subsidiary until federal antitrust action required divestiture in 1912. On April 1, 1912, there was a large explosion at the New Jersey-operated factory. Fifteen tons of black powder ignited, killing two men at the scene and leveling three buildings. Houses all across northern New Jersey shook as the shock wave hit them. When Laflin & Rand was dissolved, the reorganized Hercules Powder Company received Laflin & Rand patents for smokeless powder and continued manufacture at Kenvil, New Jersey, under the direction of Haskell ballistics laboratory director Bernhart Troxler. The former Laflin & Rand plant at Haskell operated until it was dismantled in 1926. Hercules Powder Company continued to produce Bullseye and Unique powders at other plants until selling the product line to the Alliant Powder Company. Alliant Powder Company continued manufacturing these smokeless powders into the 21st century.
