= David Kiner =

American politician

Member-elect of the Connecticut Senate from the 7th district
- Assuming office January 2027
- Succeeding: John Kissel

Member of the Connecticut House of Representatives from the 59th district
- In office January 2011 – January 2017
- Preceded by: Karen Jarmoc
- Succeeded by: Carol Hall

Personal details
- Born: March 2, 1984 (age 42)
- Party: Democratic
- Spouse: Gina Kiner
- Children: 3
- Education: Eastern Connecticut State University

David William Kiner is an American politician who was a Democratic member of the Connecticut House of Representatives. He represented the 59th district from 2011 to 2017. He was first elected in 2010 and reelected in 2012 and 2014. After serving three terms, he opted not to run for reelection in 2016.

As of April 2026, he is candidate for Connecticut's Senate 7th district in the 2026 election. In May 2026 he secured the Democratic nomination at the district convention. He defeated Republican incumbent John Kissel in the November general election.
