= Connecticut's 59th House of Representatives district =

American legislative district

Connecticut's 59th State House of Representatives district
Representative
Carol Hall; R

Connecticut's 59th House of Representatives district elects one member of the Connecticut House of Representatives. Its current representative is Republican Carol Hall.

The district consists of part of the town of Enfield, Connecticut and East Windsor, Connecticut. Before 2002, the district also contained part of the town of Somers. Prior to 1972, the 59th district included Bozrah, Colchester, Franklin, Lebanon, Lisbon and Sprague. Enfield was part of the 45th and 46th general assembly districts in 1970.

== List of representatives ==
List of Representatives from Connecticut's 59th State House District
Representative	Party	Years	District home	Note
Rubin Cohen	Democratic	1967–1973	Colchester	Seat created
Rosario T. Vella	Republican	1973–1974	Enfield	Lost reelection
Richard D. Cressotti	Democratic	1975–1976	Enfield	Did not seek reelection
William Kiner	Democratic	1977–1992	Enfield	Did not seek reelection
Stephen Jarmoc	Democratic	1993–2006	Enfield	Did not seek reelection
Karen Jarmoc	Democratic	2007–2010	Enfield	Did not seek reelection
David Kiner	Democratic	2011–2016	Enfield	Did not seek reelection
Carol Hall	Republican	2017–	Enfield	Incumbent
Rick Leborious	Democratic	2027 member-elect	Enfield	

== Recent elections ==
State Election 2024: House District 59
Party	Candidate	Votes	%	±%
Republican	Carol Hall	6,199	50.7	
Democratic	Rick LeBorious	6,021	49.3	
Majority		178		
Turnout		12,220		
Republican hold		Swing		

State Election 2022: House District 59
Party	Candidate	Votes	%	±%
Republican	Carol Hall	4,788	53.0	
Democratic	Matt Despard	4,241	47.0	
Majority		547		
Turnout		9,029		
Republican hold		Swing		

State Election 2020: House District 59
Party	Candidate	Votes	%	±%
Republican	Carol Hall	5,870	54.0	
Democratic	Gerald Calnen	5,006	46.0	
Majority		864		
Turnout		10,876		
Republican hold		Swing		

State Election 2018: House District 59
Party	Candidate	Votes	%	±%
Republican	Carol Hall	4,653	54.9	
Democratic	Tony DiPace	3,819	45.1	
Majority		834		
Turnout		8,472		
Republican hold		Swing		

State Election 2016: House District 59
Party	Candidate	Votes	%	±%
Republican	Carol Hall	5,294	54.1	
Democratic	Anthony DiPace	4,495	45.9	
Majority		799		
Turnout		9,789		
Republican gain from Democratic		Swing		

State Election 2014: House District 59
Party	Candidate	Votes	%	±%
Democratic	David Kiner	3,648	53.9	
Republican	Rob Kwasnicki	3,125	46.1	
Majority		523	7.8	
Turnout		6,773		
Democratic hold		Swing		

State Election 2012: House District 59
Party	Candidate	Votes	%	±%
Democratic	David Kiner	5,408	57.6	
Republican	Joe Bosco	3,987	42.4	
Majority		1,421	15.2	
Turnout		9,395		
Democratic hold		Swing		

State Election 2010: House District 59
Party	Candidate	Votes	%	±%
Democratic	David Kiner	4,102	57.2	
Republican	Ken Nelson Jr	3,067	42.8	
Majority		1,035	14.4	
Turnout		7,169		
Democratic hold		Swing		

State Election 2008: House District 59
Party	Candidate	Votes	%	±%
Democratic	Karen Jarmoc	6,753	72.5	+5.1
Republican	William Ballard	2,566	27.5	−3.8
Majority		4,187	44.9	+8.8
Turnout		9,319		
Democratic hold		Swing	+4.5	

State Election 2006: House District 59
Party	Candidate	Votes	%	±%
Democratic	Karen Jarmoc	4,682	67.4	+2.7
Republican	Charles E. Woods, Jr.	2,177	31.3	−2.5
Working Families	Richard G. Sweet	87	1.3	−0.2
Majority		2,505	36.1	+5.0
Turnout		6,946		
Democratic hold		Swing	+2.6	

State Election 2004: House District 59
Party	Candidate	Votes	%	±%
Democratic	Stephen Jarmoc	5,605	64.9	−31.2
Republican	Charles E. Woods, Jr.	2,918	33.8	+33.8
Working Families	Richard G. Sweet	130	1.5	−4.8
Majority		2,687	31.1	−68.9
Turnout		8,653		
Democratic hold		Swing	-32.5	

State Election 2002: House District 59
Party	Candidate	Votes	%	±%
Democratic	Stephen Jarmoc	4,322	93.7	−6.3
Working Families	Richard G. Sweet	289	6.3	+6.3
Majority		4,033	87.5	−12.5
Turnout		4,611		
Democratic hold		Swing	-6.3	

State Election 2000: House District 59
Party	Candidate	Votes	%	±%
Democratic	Stephen Jarmoc	5,138	100.0	+0.0
Majority		5,138	100.0	+0.0
Turnout		5,138		
Democratic hold		Swing	0.0	

State Election 1998: House District 59
Party	Candidate	Votes	%	±%
Democratic	Stephen Jarmoc	3,606	100.0	
Majority		3,606	100.0	
Turnout		3,606		
Democratic hold		Swing		

State Election 1996: House District 59
Party	Candidate	Votes	%	±%
Democratic	Stephen Jarmoc	5,277	100.0	
Majority		5,277	100.0	
Turnout		5,277		
Democratic hold		Swing		

State Election 1994: House District 59
Party	Candidate	Votes	%	±%
Democratic	Stephen Jarmoc	3,943	64.4	
Republican	Nicholas D. Sinsigalli, Jr.	2,176	35.6	
Majority		1,767	28.9	
Turnout		6,119		
Democratic hold		Swing		

State Election 1992: House District 59
Party	Candidate	Votes	%	±%
Democratic	Stephen Jarmoc	4,008	54.6	
Republican	Hal A. Vita, Sr.	3,333	45.4	
Majority		675	9.2	
Turnout		7,341		
Democratic hold		Swing		

State Election 1990: House District 59
Party	Candidate	Votes	%	±%
Democratic	William Kiner	4,836	66.2	
Republican	John Andrew Kissel	2,473	33.8	
Libertarian	Richard W. Loomis	83	1.1	
Majority		2,363	32.3	
Turnout		7,392		
Democratic hold		Swing		

State Election 1988: House District 59
Party	Candidate	Votes	%	±%
Democratic	William Kiner	6,611	70.2	
Republican	Gloria Dery	2,801	29.8	
Majority		3,810	40.5	
Turnout		9,412		
Democratic hold		Swing		

State Election 1986: House District 59
Party	Candidate	Votes	%	±%
Democratic	William Kiner	3,979	91.5	
	Charles A. Fuller, Jr.	369	8.5	
Majority		3,610	83.0	
Turnout		4,348		
Democratic hold		Swing		

State Election 1984: House District 59
Party	Candidate	Votes	%	±%
Democratic	William Kiner	5,302	61.0	
Republican	Sylvia Stanio	3,395	39.0	
Majority		1907	21.9	
Turnout		8,697		
Democratic hold		Swing		

State Election 1982: House District 59
Party	Candidate	Votes	%	±%
Democratic	William Kiner	4,738	72.6	
Republican	D. Carl Scarfo	1,786	27.4	
Majority		2,952	45.2	
Turnout		6,524		
Democratic hold		Swing		

State Election 1980: House District 59
Party	Candidate	Votes	%	±%
Democratic	William Kiner	5,750	71.5	
Republican	Westy T. Jones	2,292	28.5	
Majority		3,458	43.0	
Turnout		8,042		
Democratic hold		Swing		

State Election 1978: House District 59
Party	Candidate	Votes	%	±%
Democratic	William Kiner	3,567	61.0	
Republican	Rosario T. Vella	2,281	39.0	
Majority		1,286	22.0	
Turnout		5,848		
Democratic hold		Swing		

State Election 1976: House District 59
Party	Candidate	Votes	%	±%
Democratic	William Kiner	5,497	66.3	
Republican	William J. Ballard	2,797	33.7	
Majority		2,700	32.6	
Turnout		8,294		
Democratic hold		Swing		

State Election 1974: House District 59
Party	Candidate	Votes	%	±%
Democratic	Richard D. Cressotti	4,012	59.2	
Republican	Rosario T. Vella	2,766	40.8	
Majority		1,246	18.4	
Turnout		6,778		
Democratic hold		Swing		

State Election 1972: House District 59
Party	Candidate	Votes	%	±%
Republican	Rosario T. Vella	4,649	54.4	
Democratic	Stanley Bigos	3,892	45.6	
Majority		757	8.9	
Turnout		8,541		
Republican hold		Swing		
