= Sherwood Manor =

Sherwood Manor may refer to the following in the United States:

- Sherwood Manor, Connecticut, a place
- Sherwood Manor (St. Michaels, Maryland), a historic home
