= Stephen Jarmoc =

American politician (born 1962)

Member of the Connecticut House of Representatives from the 59th district
- In office January 6, 1993 – January 3, 2007
- Preceded by: Bill Kiner
- Succeeded by: Karen Jarmoc

Personal details
- Born: March 20, 1962 (age 64) Enfield, Connecticut, U.S.
- Party: Democratic

Stephen Jarmoc (born March 20, 1962) is an American politician who served in the Connecticut House of Representatives from the 59th district from 1993 to 2007.
