= John Kissel (Connecticut politician) =

American politician

John A. Kissel
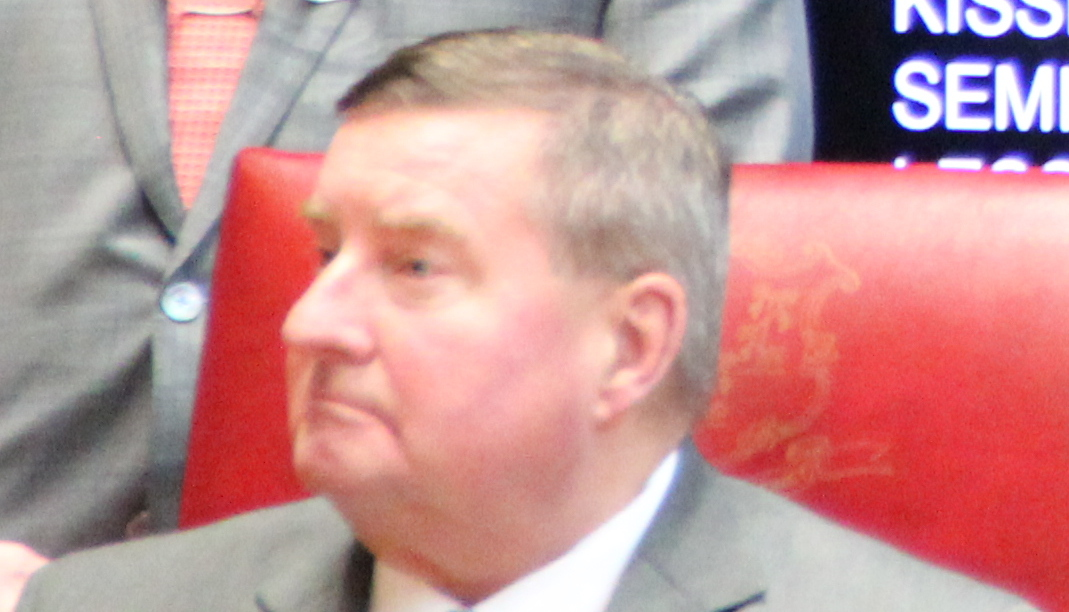
- Kissel in 2023

Member of the Connecticut State Senate from the 7th district
- Incumbent
- Assumed office February 22, 1993
- Preceded by: Con O'Leary

Personal details
- Born: 1959 (age 66–67) Worcester, Massachusetts, U.S.
- Party: Republican
- Education: University of Connecticut (BA, BS); Western New England University School of Law (JD)

John Andrew Kissel is an American politician who has served as a member of the Connecticut State Senate since 1993, representing the 7th district as a Republican.

Kissel, a resident of Enfield, represents East Granby, Enfield, Granby, Somers, Suffield, Windsor, and Windsor Locks in the Connecticut Senate.

Kissel was born Worcester, Massachusetts and raised in Windsor. He is a graduate of the University of Connecticut and the Western New England College School of Law.

In 1992, Kissel ran for the 7th State Senate district against incumbent majority leader Con O'Leary, being defeated 43-57. However, O'Leary resigned from office on January 5, 1993 to seek a job at Central Connecticut State University. In the special election held on February 21, Kissel won with 40.2% of the vote. In the November 2026 general election and after nearly 34 years in the State Senate, Kissel lost reelection to former State Representative David Kiner.

Kissel is currently employed as a corporate attorney for Eversource, an energy company serving much of Connecticut.

== Political positions ==
Kissel is a noted opponent of the legalization of marijuana, and has voted against legislation that would legalize the consumption or production of marijuana in Connecticut.

In May 2021, Kissel was the sole Nay vote on a bill to end prison gerrymandering in Connecticut. Kissel's district contains many of the largest prisons in Connecticut, and thus would need to expand if the bill is ultimately implemented.

== See also ==
- Connecticut Senate

Connecticut State Senate
Preceded by Cornelius O'Leary	Member of the Connecticut Senate from the 7th district 1993–present	Incumbent
