= Southwood Acres, Connecticut =

Census-designated place in Connecticut, United States

- Census-designated place
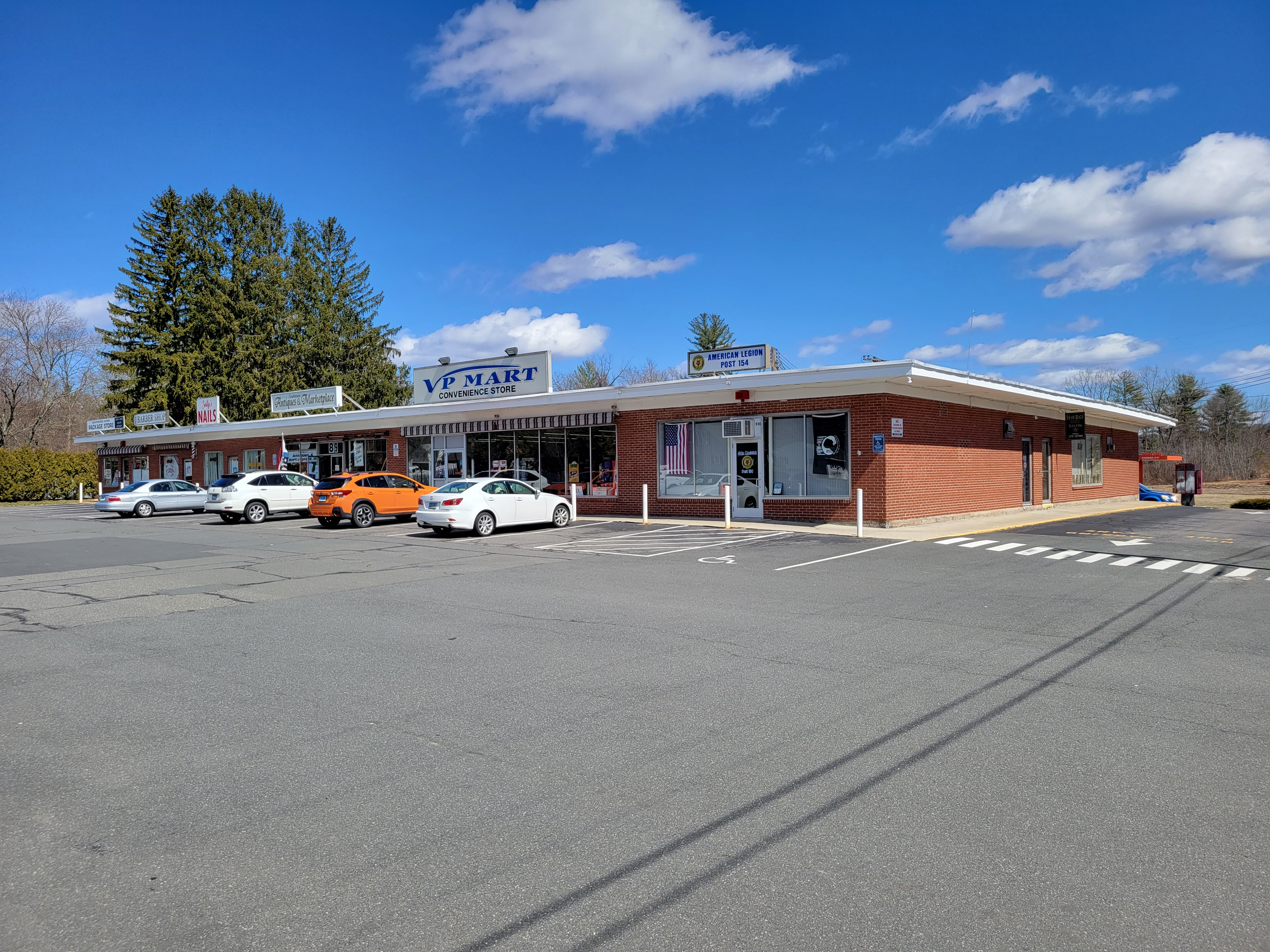
- Raffia Shopping Center

- Location of Southwood Acres in Hartford County; Location of Hartford County in Connecticut

- Location within Connecticut Location within the United States
- Coordinates: 41°57′28″N 72°34′16″W
- Country: United States
- State: Connecticut
- County: Hartford
- Town: Enfield

Area
  - Total: 4.1 sq mi (10.5 km^{2})
  - Land: 4.1 sq mi (10.5 km^{2})
  - Water: 0 sq mi (0 km^{2})
- Elevation: 123 ft (37 m)

Population (2010)
  - Total: 7,657
  - Density: 1,890/sq mi (729/km^{2})
- Time zone: UTC-5 (Eastern)
  - Summer (DST): UTC-4 (Eastern)
- ZIP code: 06082
- Area code: 860
- FIPS code: 09-71460
- GNIS feature ID: 2377864

Southwood Acres is a suburban neighborhood within the town of Enfield in northern Hartford County, Connecticut, United States. The neighborhood is listed as a census-designated place (CDP) by the U.S. Census Bureau and had a population of 7,879 at the 2020 census.

== Geography ==
According to the United States Census Bureau, the CDP has a total area of 4.1 square miles (10.5 km^{2}), all land. Southwood Acres generally refers to the area between Interstate 91 in the west and the Scantic River in the east, and between the East Windsor town line in the south and South Road in the north.

== Demographics ==
=== 2020 census ===
As of the 2020 census, Southwood Acres had a population of 7,879. The median age was 45.6 years. 18.3% of residents were under the age of 18 and 20.6% of residents were 65 years of age or older. For every 100 females there were 92.5 males, and for every 100 females age 18 and over there were 90.7 males age 18 and over.

99.7% of residents lived in urban areas, while 0.3% lived in rural areas.

There were 3,242 households in Southwood Acres, of which 26.1% had children under the age of 18 living in them. Of all households, 53.2% were married-couple households, 14.2% were households with a male householder and no spouse or partner present, and 25.0% were households with a female householder and no spouse or partner present. About 23.6% of all households were made up of individuals and 12.0% had someone living alone who was 65 years of age or older.

There were 3,333 housing units, of which 2.7% were vacant. The homeowner vacancy rate was 0.7% and the rental vacancy rate was 0.9%.

Racial composition as of the 2020 census
Race	Number	Percent
White	6,904	87.6%
Black or African American	183	2.3%
American Indian and Alaska Native	6	0.1%
Asian	135	1.7%
Native Hawaiian and Other Pacific Islander	0	0.0%
Some other race	121	1.5%
Two or more races	530	6.7%
Hispanic or Latino (of any race)	468	5.9%

=== 2000 census ===
As of the census of 2000, there were 8,067 people, 2,988 households, and 2,414 families residing in the CDP. The population density was 1,975.4 inhabitants per square mile (762.7/km^{2}). There were 3,018 housing units at an average density of 739.0 per square mile (285.3/km^{2}). The racial makeup of the CDP was 96.48% White, 0.95% African American, 0.06% Native American, 0.83% Asian, 0.73% from other races, and 0.94% from two or more races. Hispanic or Latino of any race were 1.60% of the population.

There were 2,988 households, out of which 33.8% had children under the age of 18 living with them, 68.9% were married couples living together, 8.9% had a female householder with no husband present, and 19.2% were non-families. 16.2% of all households were made up of individuals, and 7.6% had someone living alone who was 65 years of age or older. The average household size was 2.70 and the average family size was 3.02.

In the CDP, the population was spread out, with 24.6% under the age of 18, 5.4% from 18 to 24, 29.0% from 25 to 44, 26.3% from 45 to 64, and 14.6% who were 65 years of age or older. The median age was 40 years. For every 100 females, there were 94.9 males. For every 100 females age 18 and over, there were 91.6 males.

The median income for a household in the CDP was $60,743, and the median income for a family was $64,930. Males had a median income of $46,530 versus $30,984 for females. The per capita income for the CDP was $23,891. About 1.8% of families and 2.4% of the population were below the poverty line, including 0.6% of those under age 18 and 3.2% of those age 65 or over.
