= Helen Steele =

American composer and pianist

Helen Steele (born June 21, 1894) was an American composer and pianist who is best remembered today for her composition America, Our Heritage, for band and chorus.

Steele was born in Enfield, Connecticut, to Agnes McCane and George Steele. She studied music at Wellesley College and Mount Holyoke, where she earned a B.A. On September 12, 1921, she married Wager Swayne Kelly, a voice teacher who also used the name Wager Harris. He died in 1944.

Steele accompanied tenor Enrique Ruiz on piano on his recitals, and collaborated with him on several compositions. Her composition America, Our Heritage, was performed live on the Ed Sullivan Show on August 17, 1969, and recorded by the Washington D.C. Festival Chorus.

Steele was a member of the American Society of Composers, Authors, and Publishers (ASCAP). Her music was published by Shawnee Press, Inc. Her vocal compositions included:

- America, Our Heritage (band and chorus; arranged by Hawley Ades)
- “Duerme”
- “El Afilador” (The Scissors Grinder; with Enrique Ruiz and Guido Vandt)
- “Lagrimas” (Blue Tears; English text by Guido Vandt; Spanish text and music by Enrique Ruiz; arranged by Helen Steele)
- “Legend of Befana”
- “Let’s Planet”
- “May Our Love Today Live Tomorrow” (text by Guido Vandt; music by Enrique Ruiz and Helen Steele)
