= Enfield Historic District =

Historic district in Connecticut, United States

- U.S. National Register of Historic Places
- U.S. Historic district
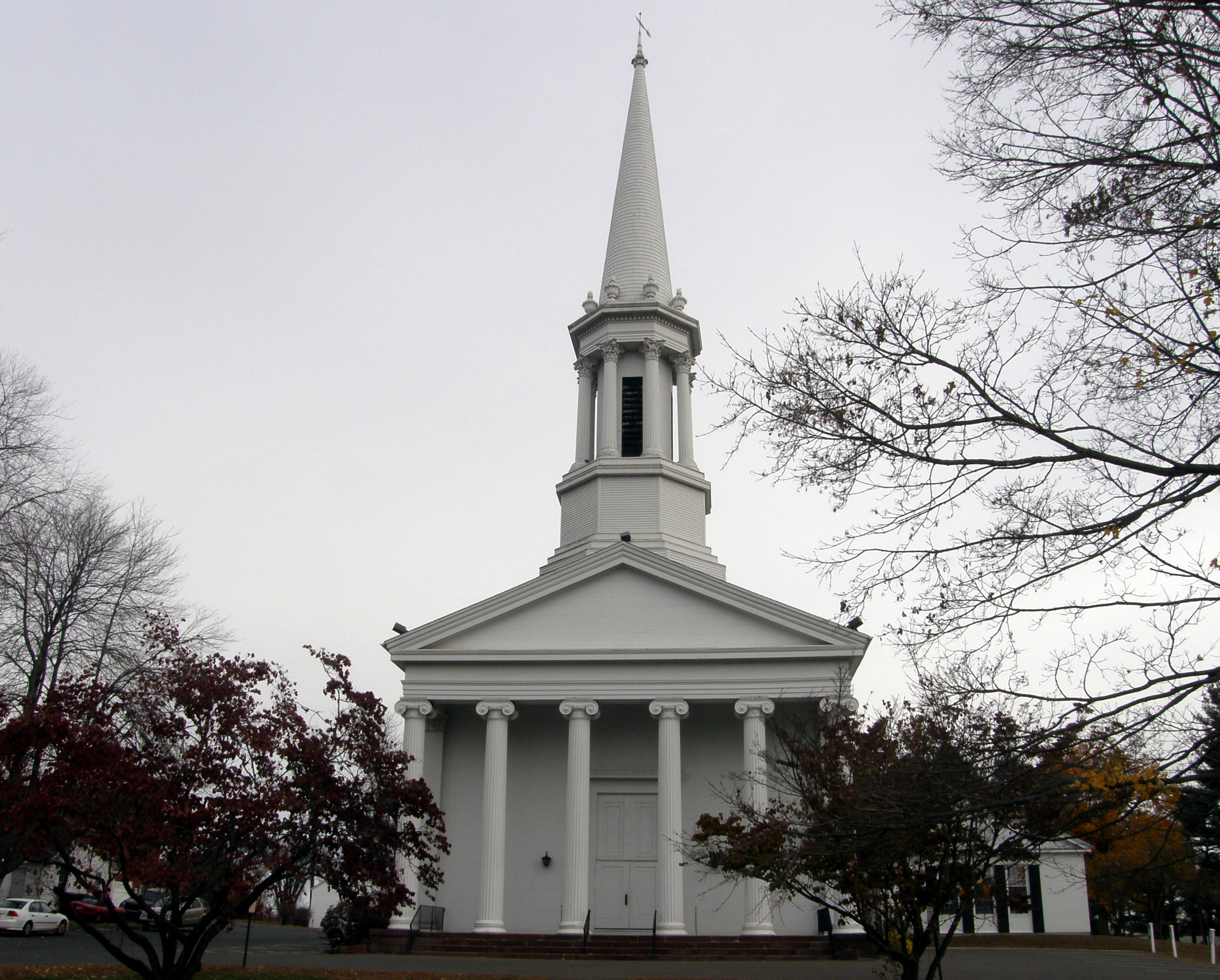
- Enfield Congregational Church

- Location within Connecticut Location within the United States
- Location: 1106-1492 Enfield Street, Enfield, Connecticut
- Coordinates: 41°58′34″N 72°35′37″W
- Area: 160 acres (65 ha)
- Built: 1848
- Architect: Stone, F.M.; Multiple
- Architectural style: Mid 19th Century Revival, Late Victorian, Georgian
- NRHP reference No.: 79002664
- Added to NRHP: August 10, 1979

The Enfield Historic District encompasses a two-mile stretch of Enfield Street, the main north-south road of Enfield, Connecticut. Centered on the town common with its church and old town hall, it includes a diversity of residential architecture from the 18th to early 20th centuries. The district was listed on the National Register of Historic Places in 1979.

== Description and history ==
The town of Enfield was settled in the 17th century and incorporated in 1683. Enfield Street, now designated United States Route 5, has from an early date been the principal north-south route just east of the Connecticut River, set on a ridge above its flood plain. Lots were laid out as strips of land from the road to the river, with houses located near the road and the rest used for agriculture. This land use pattern persisted into the 20th century, generally avoiding commercial development. The result is a landscape of primarily residential architecture extending across three centuries, with central cluster of civic buildings.

The historic district is essentially linear, running along Enfield Street for 2 miles (3.2 km) from Connecticut Route 190 in the north to the junction of Old King Street and Oliver Road in the south. Residential architecture predominates in the district, with wood frame houses 1-1/2 to 2-1/2 stories in height. Stylistically they are diverse, although layout and spatial arrangement are fairly consistent. The most elaborate house is that of Orrin Thompson, at the southeast corner of Enfield Street and South Road; it is a large brick Greek Revival house built in 1832 for the founder of Enfield's carpet-making businesses. It overlooks the town's 17th-century parade ground, near which also stand the 1848 Congregational Church, and the former town hall, both of which are also in the Greek Revival.

== See also ==
- National Register of Historic Places listings in Hartford County, Connecticut
