= Enfield station (Connecticut) =

Railway station in Thompsonville, Connecticut, US

Enfield
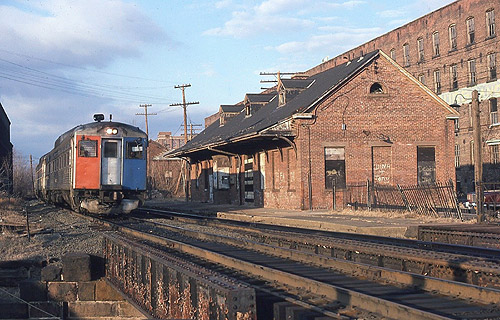
- An Amtrak train at the previous station in 1980

General information
- Location: Main Street at North River Street; Enfield, Connecticut
- Coordinates: 41.9992°N 72.6044°W
- Line: New Haven–Springfield Line
- Platforms: 1 side platform (planned)
- Tracks: 1

Construction
- Parking: 80 spaces (planned)

History
- Opening: 2029

Future services
Preceding station	CT Rail	Following station
Windsor Locks toward New Haven Union Station	Hartford Line	Springfield Terminus
Preceding station	Amtrak	Following station
Windsor Locks toward New Haven	Hartford Line	Springfield Terminus
Former services
Preceding station	Amtrak	Following station
Windsor Locks toward New Haven	Connecticut Valley Service	Springfield Terminus
Location

Enfield station is an under-construction railroad station in the Thompsonville village of Enfield, Connecticut. It will be served by CTrail-operated Hartford Line and Amtrak-operated Hartford Line service. The station will have a single side platform serving the single track of the New Haven–Springfield Line. Construction began in October 2026; the station is planned to open in 2029. A previous station at the site was open from 1844 to 1986.

== History ==
=== Amtrak ===
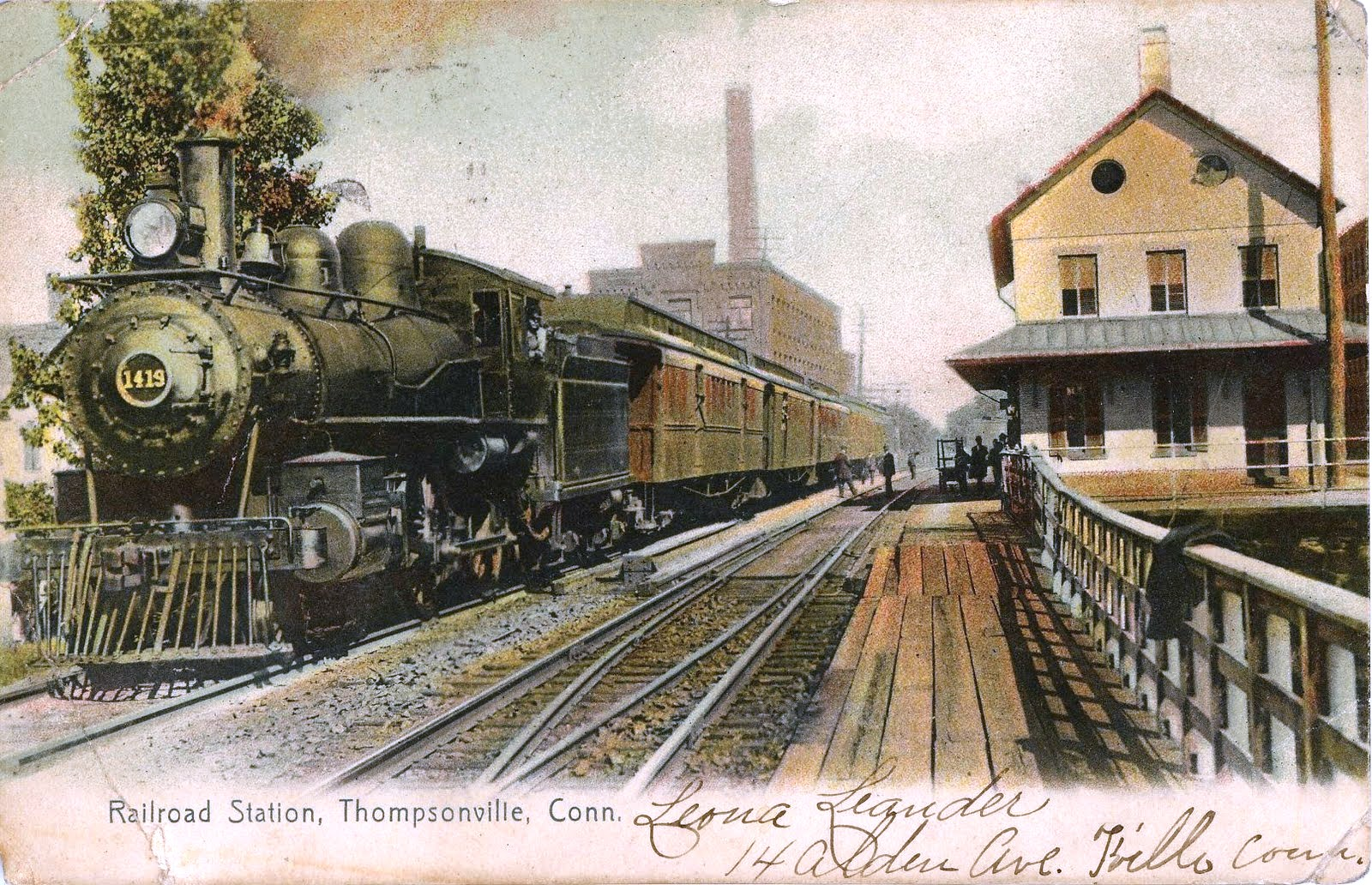
Thompsonville station on a 1909 postcard

The Hartford and New Haven Railroad (H&NH) opened from Hartford to Springfield in December 1844. Thompsonville station, located on the east side of the tracks just north of Main Street, opened with the line. It was replaced by a two-story brick station around 1870, with a wooden addition for the Railway Express Agency built later on the north end of the structure.

In 1946, the second story - then rented out as apartments - and the wooden addition were removed. The modified station building was used until 1971, when Penn Central closed it shortly before Amtrak took over passenger service. Thompsonville remained a stop - daily ridership exceeded 40 on the Connecticut Yankee in 1974 - but passengers waited on the bare platform. Amtrak bought the line in 1976; after frequent vandalism and a January 26, 1980, fire, they proposed to remove the boarded-up century-old building. Although it was kept for several more years for the possibility of restoration and inclusion on the National Register of Historic Places, the station and the adjacent freight house were demolished in early 1983.

In 1980, Amtrak constructed several small shelters at Thompsonville station. It was part of a $12 million effort to improve the line, which included opening the North Haven station and buying twelve Budd SPV-2000 railcars to increase frequencies on the Connecticut Valley Service. The station was renamed as Enfield starting with the February 1981 schedule. Service to Enfield and North Haven ended on October 28, 1986, due to low ridership; Enfield averaged five daily passengers spread between eight trains. The shelters were subsequently removed, but the crumbling platform is extant.

=== Hartford Line ===
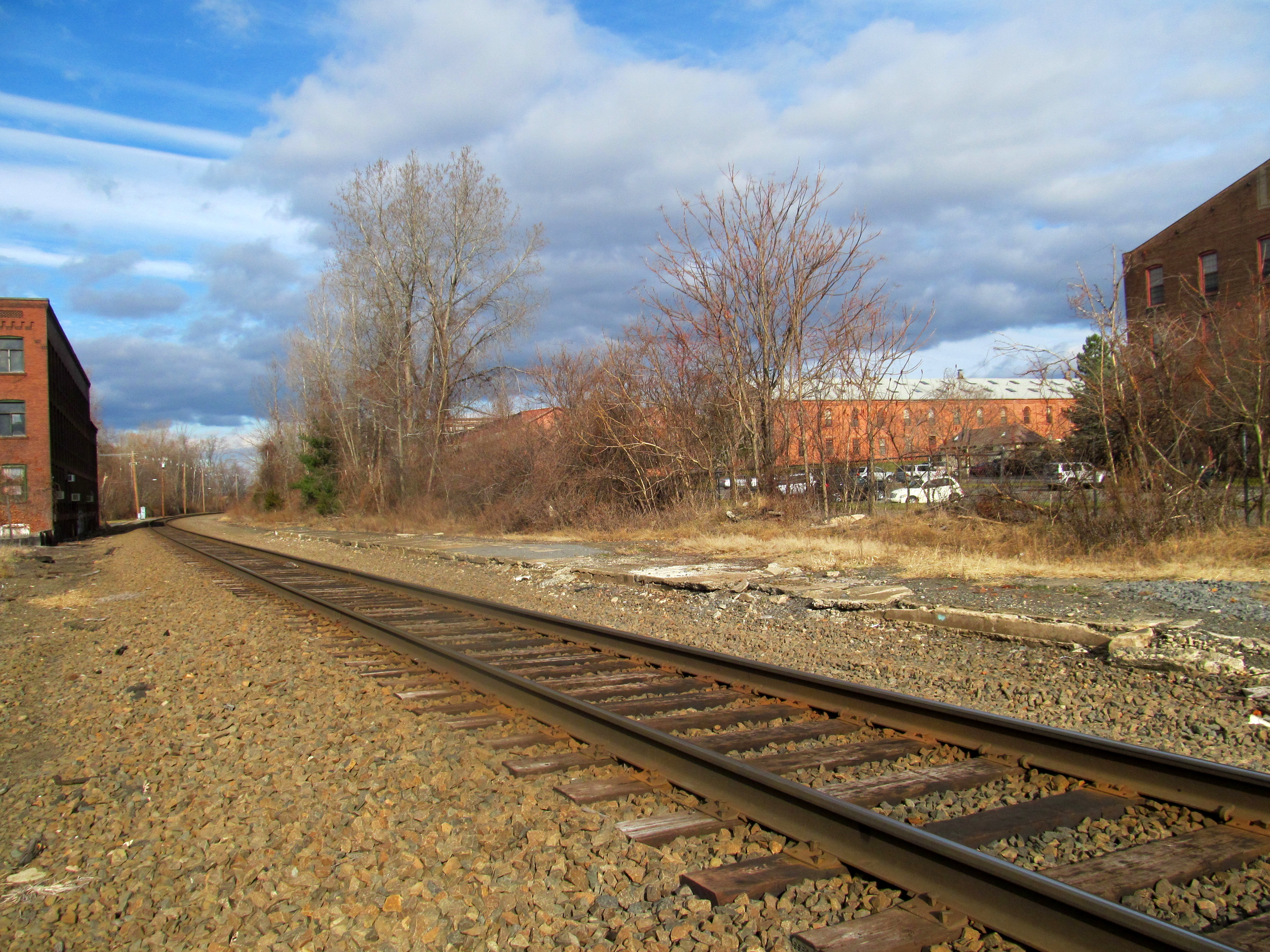
Former Thompsonville station platform and site of the future Enfield station photographed in 2014

In 2004, the Recommended Action of the New Haven Hartford Springfield Commuter Rail Implementation Study included the construction of a new Enfield station at Main Street. A preliminary design located parking lots on Main Street with a smaller lot east of the tracks. The station is proposed to be built on Main Street at North River Street in Thompsonville, near the downtown area. Plans released in 2013 called for the station to have two 180-foot high-level platforms, each with a 100-foot shelter, connected by an elevated pedestrian bridge. A small parking lot would be built on the west side of the tracks, with a larger lot shared with the Bigelow Commons development on the east side. The station was estimated to cost $6–9.5 million.

In February 2017, the state announced an additional $50 million in funds, including money to complete design of Enfield station. Design was to be completed by 2020. Hartford Line service began operation on June 16, 2018. In April 2019, the town proposed to fund construction of an interim station – a single side platform on the west side of the single track. That proposal would allow service to Enfield to begin while the state searches for funding for full double-tracking and a permanent station. The town set aside $670,000 of the estimated $2.5 million cost in October 2019.

By January 2021, the station was expected to be complete by the end of 2022. By April 2021, platform construction was expected to begin in October 2022, with the station opening about a year later. The state designated $35 million for the station project in December 2021. In June 2022, the state announced $13.8 million in federal funding for the station. At that time, design was expected to be complete in mid-2023, with construction beginning in early 2024. In March 2021, the adjacent vacant "Casket Building", a brick building that was once used to manufacture casket hardware burnt down; plans for the station had connected the structure to the southbound platform to provide station amenities.

By October 2023, plans called for a single 350-foot (110 m)-long platform and a 550-square-foot (51 m^{2}) waiting room to be built on the east side of the track. The single-track bridge over Main Street would be rebuilt with a two-track deck and an accessible sidewalk added along the roadway, which would also serve as access to a possible future second platform. Asnuntuck Street would be closed at the tracks, with the existing substandard bridge there eliminated. Construction was expected to begin in early 2025 with completion in late 2027 at a cost of $45 million. An environmental assessment was released in May 2024.

Groundbreaking for the $125 million project took place on October 28, 2026, with completion expected in 2029.
