= Karen Jarmoc =

American politician (born 1967)

Member of the Connecticut House of Representatives from the 59th district
- In office January 3, 2007 – January 5, 2011
- Preceded by: Stephen Jarmoc
- Succeeded by: David Kiner

Personal details
- Born: April 27, 1967 (age 59)
- Party: Democratic

Karen Jarmoc (born April 27, 1967) is an American politician who served in the Connecticut House of Representatives from the 59th district from 2007 to 2011.
