= Connecticut's 7th State Senate district =

American legislative district

Senator
| John Kissel; R |

Connecticut's 7th State Senate district elects one member of the Connecticut State Senate. Its current senator is Republican John Kissel, who was first elected in 1994. The district is centered on the town of Enfield and also contains the towns of Suffield, Windsor Locks, East Granby, Somers and parts of Granby and Windsor.

== List of senators ==
| Senator | Party | Years | District home | Note |
|---|---|---|---|---|
| James R. Rabbett | Democratic | 1937 – 1939 | Windsor Locks | Defeated for reelection |
| Frank A. Simmons | Republican | 1939 – 1943 | Enfield | Did not run for reelection |
| John Christensen | Republican | 1943 – 1945 | Windsor | Did not run for reelection |
| Charles H. Vincent | Republican | 1945 – 1947 | Simsbury | Did not run for reelection |
| Ernest E. Carpenter | Republican | 1947 – 1949 | Bloomfield | Did not run for reelection |
| Frank J. Monchun | Democratic | 1949 – 1953 | Windsor | Defeated for reelection |
| James B. Lowell | Republican | 1953 – 1955 | Canton | Did not run for reelection |
| Phillip P. Laing | Democratic | 1955 – 1957 | Windsor | Did not run for reelection |
| Albert C. Snyder | Republican | 1957 – 1959 | Bloomfield | Did not run for reelection |
| Charles T. Alfano | Democratic | 1959 – 1977 | Suffield | Did not run for reelection |
| Cornelius P. O'Leary | Democratic | 1977 – 1993 | Windsor Locks | Stepped down prior to 1993 swearing in |
| John A. Kissel | Republican | 1993 – present | Enfield | Incumbent |

== Recent Elections ==
State Election 2024: State Senate District 7
| Party | Candidate | Votes | % | ±% |
|---|---|---|---|---|
| Republican | John Kissel | 28,227 | 54.4 | |
| Democratic | Cynthia Mangini | 23,679 | 45.6 | |
| Majority | | 4,548 | | |
| Turnout | | 51,956 | | |
| Republican hold | | Swing | | |

State Election 2022: State Senate District 7
| Party | Candidate | Votes | % | ±% |
|---|---|---|---|---|
| Republican | John Kissel | 22,223 | 57.0 | |
| Democratic | Cynthia Mangini | 16,757 | 43.0 | |
| Majority | | 5,466 | | |
| Turnout | | 38,980 | | |
| Republican hold | | Swing | | |

State Election 2020: State Senate District 7
| Party | Candidate | Votes | % | ±% |
|---|---|---|---|---|
| Republican | John Kissel | 28,327 | 54.0 | |
| Democratic | Fredrick Moffa | 24,144 | 46.0 | |
| Majority | | 4,183 | | |
| Turnout | | 52,471 | | |
| Republican hold | | Swing | | |

State Election 2018: State Senate District 7
| Party | Candidate | Votes | % | ±% |
|---|---|---|---|---|
| Republican | John Kissel | 22,004 | 54.4 | |
| Democratic | Annie Hornish | 18,476 | 45.6 | |
| Majority | | 3,528 | | |
| Turnout | | 40,480 | | |
| Republican hold | | Swing | | |

State Election 2016: State Senate District 7
| Party | Candidate | Votes | % | ±% |
|---|---|---|---|---|
| Republican | John Kissel | 28,651 | 60.9 | |
| Democratic | Annie Hornish | 18,388 | 39.1 | |
| Majority | | 10,263 | | |
| Turnout | | 47,039 | | |
| Republican hold | | Swing | | |

State Election 2014: State Senate District 7
| Party | Candidate | Votes | % | ±% |
|---|---|---|---|---|
| Republican | John Kissel | 22,160 | 69.5 | |
| Democratic | John Foxx | 9,704 | 30.5 | |
| Majority | | 12,456 | | |
| Turnout | | 31,864 | | |
| Republican hold | | Swing | | |

State Election 2012: State Senate District 7
| Party | Candidate | Votes | % | ±% |
|---|---|---|---|---|
| Republican | John Kissel | 22,182 | 50.6 | |
| Democratic | Karen Jarmoc | 21,674 | 49.4 | |
| Majority | | 508 | | |
| Turnout | | 43,856 | | |
| Republican hold | | Swing | | |

State Election 2010: State Senate District 7
| Party | Candidate | Votes | % | ±% |
|---|---|---|---|---|
| Republican | John Kissel | 17,272 | 51.5 | |
| Democratic | Karen Jarmoc | 16,286 | 48.5 | |
| Majority | | 986 | | |
| Turnout | | 33,558 | | |
| Republican hold | | Swing | | |

State Election 2008: State Senate District 7
| Party | Candidate | Votes | % | ±% |
|---|---|---|---|---|
| Republican | John Kissel | 24,206 | 54.9 | |
| Democratic | George Colli | 19,870 | 48.5 | |
| Majority | | 4,336 | | |
| Turnout | | 44,076 | | |
| Republican hold | | Swing | | |

State Election 2006: State Senate District 7
| Party | Candidate | Votes | % | ±% |
|---|---|---|---|---|
| Republican | John Kissel | 16,979 | 52.7 | |
| Democratic | Bill Kiner | 15,254 | 47.3 | |
| Majority | | 1,725 | | |
| Turnout | | 32,233 | | |
| Republican hold | | Swing | | |

State Election 2004: State Senate District 7
| Party | Candidate | Votes | % | ±% |
|---|---|---|---|---|
| Republican | John Kissel | 21,072 | 50.8 | |
| Democratic | Bill Kiner | 20,392 | 49.2 | |
| Majority | | 680 | | |
| Turnout | | 41,464 | | |
| Republican hold | | Swing | | |
