= Enfield Public Schools =

School district in Enfield, Connecticut, United States

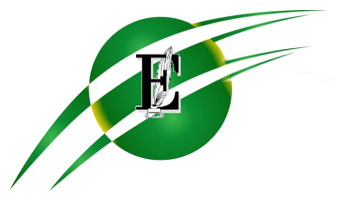

Address
- 1010 Enfield Street Enfield, Connecticut; United States
- Coordinates: 42.0027°N 72.5623°W

District information
- Motto: Building a world class school system of tomorrow, today!
- Grades: Pre K-12
- Superintendent: Chris Drezek

Other information
- Website: www.enfieldschools.org

Enfield Public Schools is a school district located in Hartford County, in Enfield, Connecticut. The district's boundaries are coterminous with those of the town. Approximately 5,000 students, grades Pre K–12, attend the Enfield Public Schools. The town's schools are organized into three Pre-K through 2nd grade primary schools coupled through a sister-school concept with three 3rd through 5th grade intermediate schools, one sixth grade through eighth grade middle school, and one ninth grade through twelfth grade high school.

== List of Enfield Public Schools ==
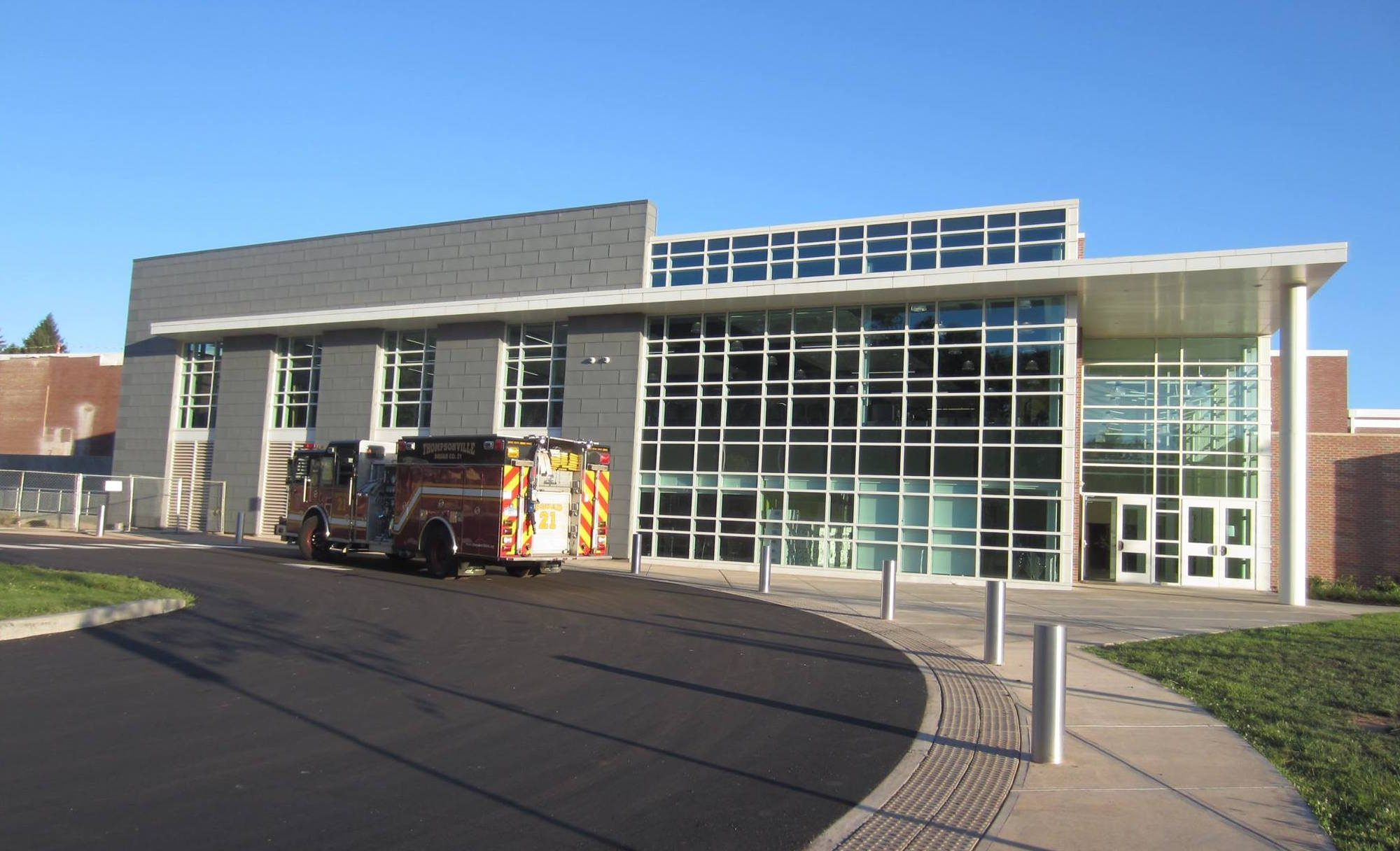
Enfield High School's Gymnasium Entrance.

=== High School (grades 9-12) ===
- Enfield High School

=== Middle School (grades 6-8) ===
- John F. Kennedy Middle School

=== Intermediate Schools (grades 3-5) ===
- Edgar H. Parkman School
- Eli Whitney School
- Prudence Crandall School

=== Primary Schools (grades Pre K-2) ===
- Enfield Street School
- Hazardville Memorial School
- Henry Barnard School

The town operates one high school (9–12), one middle school (6–8), three intermediate schools (3–5), and three primary elementary schools (Pre K-2). In 2010, due to enrollment decreases, Enfield Public Schools closed two elementary schools: Harriet Beecher Stowe School and Thomas G. Alcorn School (previously the town's high school prior to the 1960s). Nathan Hale School, once a primary school, closed in 2017. Compliance to Connecticut's racial imbalance laws led to redistricting and reorganization of the town's elementary schools into primary and intermediate schools, away from the former "neighborhood school" organization. Subsequently, due to further declining enrollment, Enfield's two high schools, Enfield High School and Enrico Fermi High School consolidated in 2016 after a significant expansion and "as new" renovation of the Enfield High School site.

== Other Public Schools ==
- Head Start
- CREC Public Safety Academy
- Stowe Early Learning Center

== Community College ==
- Asnuntuck Community College

Until the early 1980s, Enfield John F. Kennedy and its crosstown rival, Kosciuscko Junior High School (a school named for a hero of the American Revolution), operated as the town's two middle schools .It closed down as the demographics of the town changed and two distinct junior highs became clearly unnecessary. The facility of Kosciuscko Junior High School is now used as Enfield's Asnuntuck Community College.
