= Enfield Town Meetinghouse =

- U.S. National Register of Historic Places
- U.S. Historic district – Contributing property
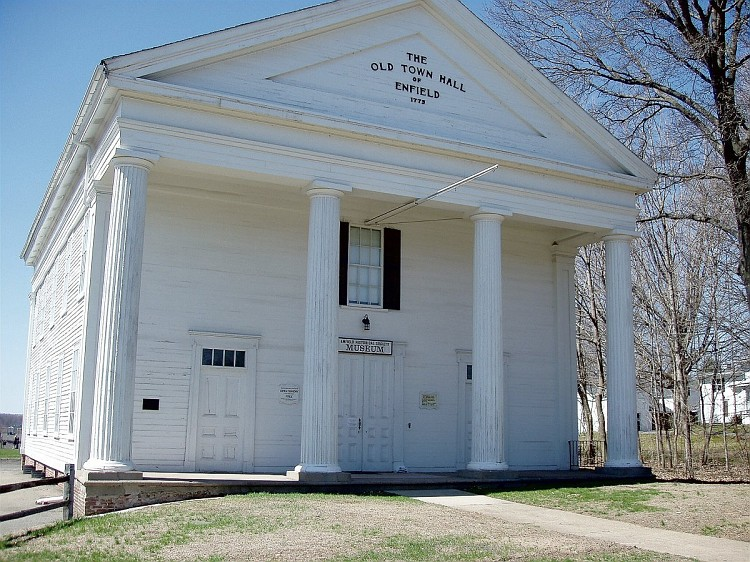

- Location within Connecticut Location within the United States
- Location: Enfield Street at South Road, Enfield, Connecticut
- Coordinates: 41°58′37″N 72°35′33″W
- Area: less than 10 acres (4.0 ha)
- Built: 1773
- Architectural style: Greek Revival
- Part of: Enfield Historic District (ID79002664)
- NRHP reference No.: 74002050

Significant dates
- Added to NRHP: September 10, 1974
- Designated CP: August 10, 1979

The Enfield Town Meetinghouse is a historic Greek Revival style meeting house located on Enfield Street at South Road in Enfield, Connecticut. Completed in 1775 and moved and restyled in 1848, it hosted the municipal government until the 1920s. Now managed by the local historical society as a museum, it was listed on the National Register of Historic Places in 1974.

== Description and history ==
The Enfield Town Meetinghouse occupies a prominent location in the historic town center of Enfield, on the west side of Enfield Street (United States Route 5) just north of its junction with South Street, and across the street from the fourth building used by the Enfield Congregational Church. It is a two-story wood frame structure, with a front-facing gabled roof, and clapboarded exterior. It is set on a brick foundation. The front facade is its most distinguished feature, resembling a Greek temple portico with four fluted Ionic columns supporting an entablature and fully pedimented gable. There are three entrances, the outer two identical single-leaf doorways topped by transom windows and framed by Greek Revival pilasters and corniced entablature. The center entrance is a double-leaf entry with similar surround but no transom.

The meetinghouse was built in 1773-74 by a local builder named Isaac Kirby, and was based on a similar building in East Windsor. Originally located across the street, it was moved to its present location in 1848, at which time its Greek Revival features were also added. It served as the community's town hall and principal meeting place until the 1920s, after which it served as a community meeting space, hosting dances, parties, and other events. It is now maintained by the local historical society as a museum.

== See also ==
- National Register of Historic Places listings in Hartford County, Connecticut
