= Enrico Fermi High School =

Former high school in Connecticut

Location
- 124 North Maple Street; Enfield, Connecticut 06082; United States; 42.0006918°N 72.5412179°W

Information
- School type: Public High School
- Opened: 1971-2016 (closed)
- School district: Enfield Public Schools
- CEEB code: 70179
- Principal: Paul Newton
- Staff: 15.2 (FTE) (as of 2005-06)
- Teaching staff: 84.4 (FTE) (as of 2007-08)
- Grades: 9-12
- Enrollment: 1,156 (as of 2007-08)
- Student to teacher ratio: 13.7 (as of 2007-08)
- Colors: Black, White, and Columbia Blue
- Slogan: Responsible Citizens - Lifelong Learners
- Athletics conference: Central Connecticut Conference
- Team name: Falcons
- Publication: Falcon's Nest
- Newspaper: "Enrico's Inquirer"
- Yearbook: Traces
- Website: Enrico Fermi Homepage
- Enrico Fermi High School

Enrico Fermi High School (defunct) was a high school located in Enfield, Connecticut, and closed when it consolidated with Enfield High School in 2016. The Enrico Fermi name was transferred to a wing of the Enfield High School building, and the original building is now known as the Enfield Municipal Annex.

== Overview ==
Enrico Fermi High School was established in 1971. It previously served the Enfield community along with Enfield High School as one of the town's two high schools.

Fermi High School Yearbooks have been archived online and are available at no cost.

== Consolidation with Enfield High School ==
In May 2010, it was voted that Enfield High School and Enrico Fermi High School would undergo a consolidation process as part of the restructuring and improvement plan of Enfield Public Schools. In November 2012, a town-wide referendum to appropriate $103 million for additions and renovations to Enfield High School overwhelmingly passed by a 2:1 margin. As a result of the consolidation Enrico Fermi High School was closed, resulting in yearly savings of $2 million, which paid for bonding for the renovations and additions to Enfield High School. The State of Connecticut provided more than 70% reimbursement for construction to Enfield High School, as well. Students from Enrico Fermi moved into the expanded high school after construction finished in 2017, with an expected town-wide high school enrollment of 1,500 students. Proposed uses of the vacated building included moving the middle school to the Enrico Fermi location or renovating the building as a town library/community center. The Enrico Fermi name was used as the name of the new STEAM wing of the expanded and renovated Enfield High School. In 2016, Enrico Fermi High School closed, and its students began attending Enfield High School. Since the consolidation the facility has been renamed the Enfield Municipal Annex, and is used for adult education & other services.

== History ==
The school is named after Italian physicist Enrico Fermi. A 41-acre (170,000 m^{2}) site for the school was purchased in February 1968 and a ground-breaking ceremony took place on September 14, 1968. The school opened for the 1971-72 school year with Mr. Anthony Torre as principal.

== Campus ==
The building was designed by Charles "Ted" Bellingrath of Hartford firm Gibson von Dohlen and built by Fontaine Brothers of Springfield, MA.

For several years the fields were off limits and sports teams were required to drive to different locations in order to practice as harmful chemicals were found in the soil. The fields were redone and improved. "The Work" consisted of remediation of approximately 41 acres of landscape area throughout the entire Fermi High School site. It was the intent of this project to cover the contaminated soil with new topsoil brought onto the site

== Curriculum ==
The school offered a comprehensive college preparatory curriculum. Students participated in Advanced Placement courses, University of Connecticut Early College Experience courses, and vocational education offered both at the school and Asnuntuck Community College.

== Extracurricular activities ==
Student groups and activities at Enrico Fermi High School included art club, badminton club, bowling club, chess club, dance team, Lamplighters drama, DECA, FBLA, Future Teachers Club, LEO Club, Mathletes, Model United Nations, National Honor Society, peer mediation, Buzz Robotics, science club, video game club, ski club, a string ensemble, student council, Jazz Ensemble, and yearbook.

The school's athletic teams, known as the Fermi Falcons, competed in the Central Connecticut Conference. Teams were fielded in baseball, basketball, cheerleading, cross country, field hockey, football, golf, ice hockey, indoor track, soccer, softball, swimming, tennis, track and field, volleyball, and wrestling. The school had a cross-town rivalry with Enfield High School, playing a football game on Thanksgiving Day. In all other sports they competed as well, with each school having their favored teams. For example, Fermi’s wrestling team historically beat Enfield’s, and Enfield High’s football team had not lost a football game to Fermi in many years.
