= Rick LeBorious =

American politician

Member-elect of the Connecticut House of Representatives from the 59th district
- Assuming office January 2027
- Succeeding: Carol Hall

Personal details
- Party: Democratic
- Website: Campaign website

Richard (Rick) LeBorious is an American politician. A member of the Democratic Party, he is the member-elect for the 59th district of the Connecticut House of Representatives. He was elected at the 2026 election. He was a candidate in 2024. He is the former mayor of Enfield, Connecticut.
