= North Haven station =

Former and proposed railway station in North Haven, Connecticut

North Haven
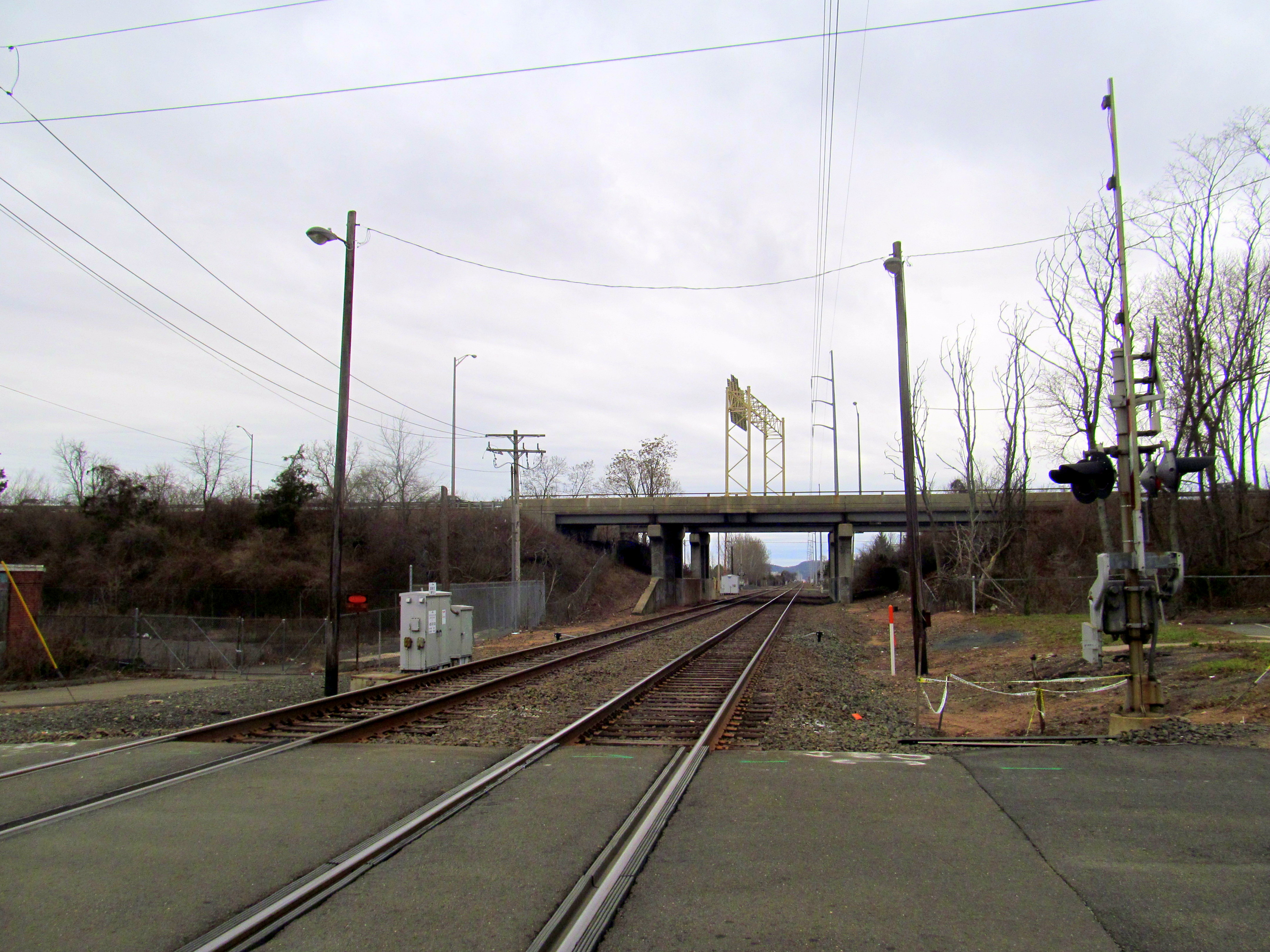
- Site of the former Amtrak station and future Hartford Line station photographed in December 2015

General information
- Location: Devine Street; North Haven, Connecticut
- Coordinates: 41.3775°N 72.8783°W
- Line: New Haven–Springfield Line
- Platforms: 2 side platforms (planned)
- Tracks: 2

Construction
- Parking: 202 spaces (planned)

Future services
Preceding station	CT Rail	Following station
New Haven State Street toward New Haven Union Station	Hartford Line (planned station)	Wallingford toward Springfield

Former services
Preceding station	Amtrak	Following station
New Haven Terminus	Connecticut Valley Service	Wallingford toward Springfield
Location

North Haven is a planned regional rail station on the New Haven–Springfield Line near Route 40 and Route 5 in North Haven, Connecticut, to be served by the Hartford Line service. The project has been funded for design, with construction expected to cost $52 million.

The first North Haven station opened on Broadway in 1838 on the Hartford and New Haven Railroad. One of its replacements, built in 1867 and still standing, was served until around 1971 by the New Haven Railroad and Penn Central. Amtrak operated a station at the modern site from 1980 to 1986.

== History ==
=== Previous stations ===
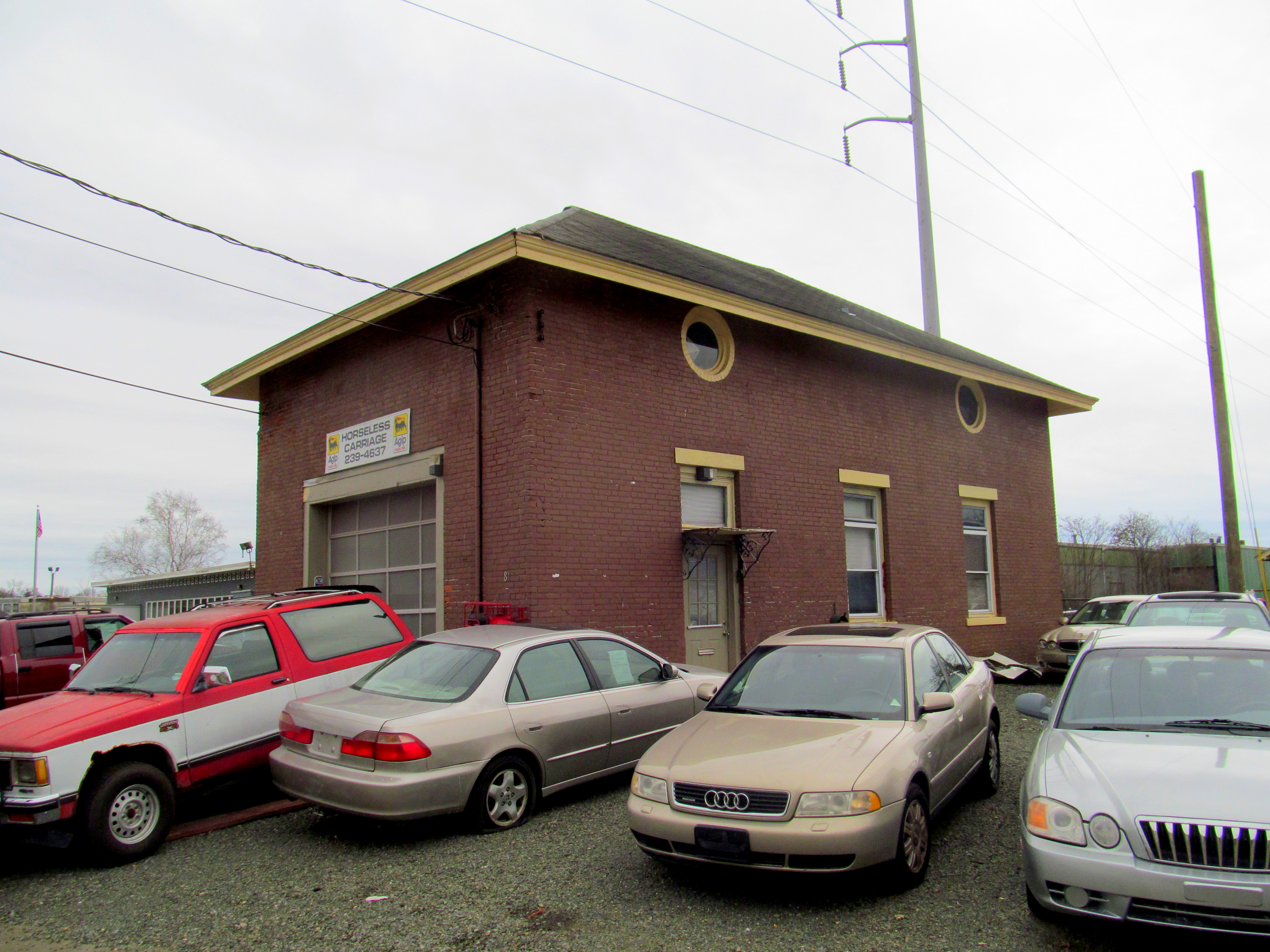
The 1867-built North Haven station building in 2015

The Hartford and New Haven Railroad (H&NH) opened from New Haven to Meriden in December 1838. A room in a private home on Broadway just east of the tracks served as North Haven station from then until around 1850, when a dedicated station was built nearby. The station, also used as the post office and a general store, burned on March 31, 1865. A nearby store appears to have been used as the station for the next two years.

The H&NH built a new brick station on the west side of the tracks in 1867. A wooden freight house was constructed nearby later in the century. The 1867 station was in use for just over a century; it was still served by several New Haven Railroad trains in the early 1960s, but was no longer a stop when Amtrak took over service on the line from Penn Central on May 1, 1971. The station and freight house are still extant, although the four chimneys and the canopy have been removed from the station.

On October 26, 1980, the state opened a new North Haven station off Devine Street near the Route 40 Connector, 0.9 miles (1.4 km) to the south of the former station. The new station had two small wooden platforms and a 100-car parking lot. It was part of a $12 million effort to improve the line, which included buying twelve Budd SPV-2000 railcars to increase frequencies. The station was served by Amtrak's Connecticut Valley Service until October 26, 1986, when it and Enfield were abandoned due to low ridership. The station platforms were removed after closure, but the parking lot was repurposed as a park-and-ride lot for auto commuters.

=== Hartford Line station ===
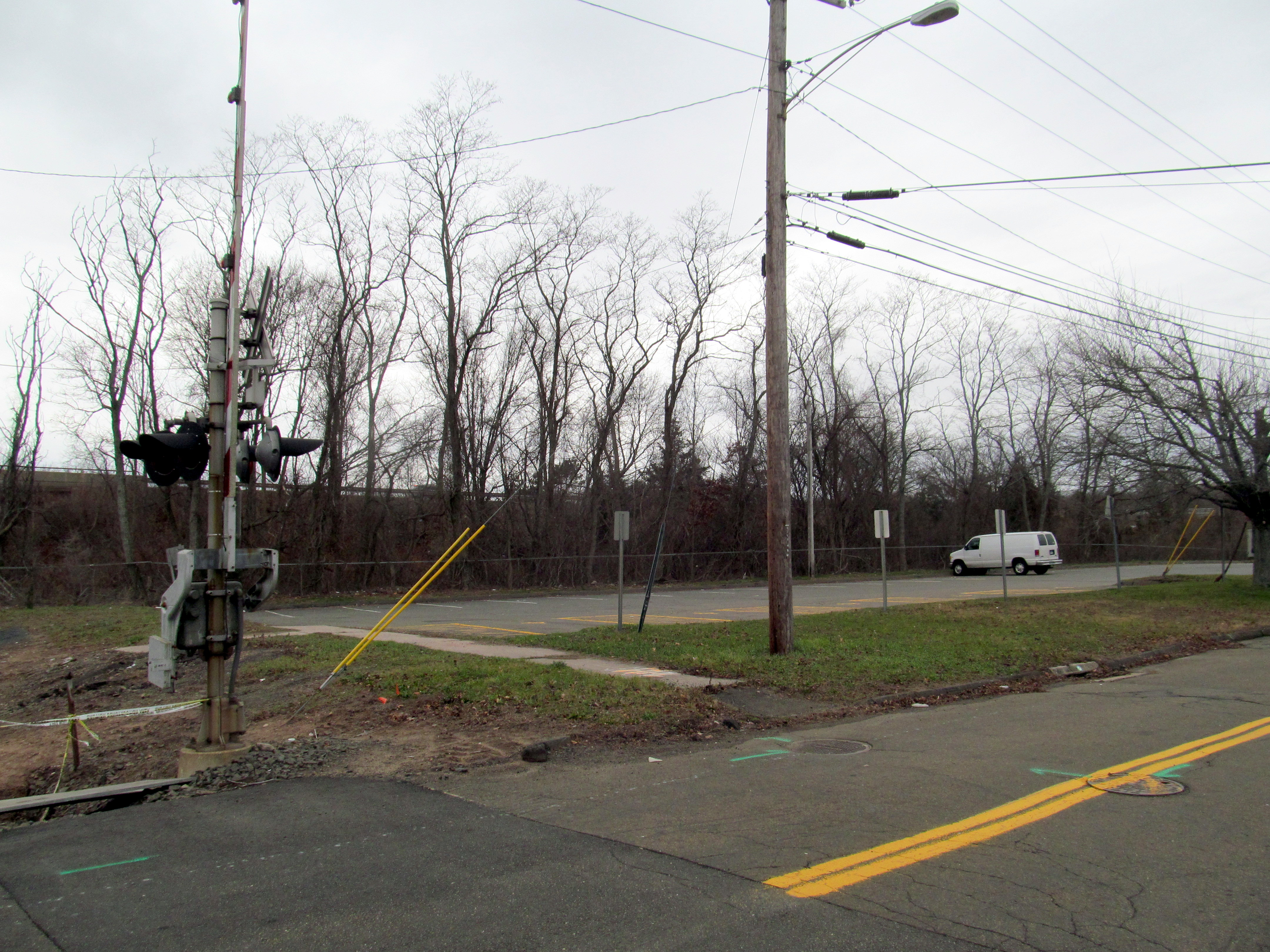
The parking lot from the 1980s station, now used as a park-and-ride lot, will be reused for the new station

In 2004, the Recommended Action of the New Haven Hartford Springfield Commuter Rail Implementation Study included the construction of a new North Haven/Hamden station as part of the Hartford Line (then just the New Haven-Hartford-Springfield Commuter Rail Line.) Such a station was estimated to cost between $6 million and $9.5 million. The station is proposed to be located off Devine Street in North Haven, adjacent to the intersection of State Street (US 5) and CT-40. Direct access from I-91 will be possible via Route 40, while commuters coming from the Wilbur Cross Parkway (which is intended for traffic bypassing New Haven) will have to use surface streets from the nearest exits. A preliminary design in 2006 located the station platforms between Devine Street and Route 40. A new parking lot west of Route 5 would have been shared between station and park-and-ride uses, with the existing park-and-ride lot dedicated for station parking.

Revised plans released in 2012 replaced the new western parking lot with a lot east of the tracks to prevent riders from having to cross busy Route 5 on foot. The station will consist of two 180-foot high-level platforms, each with a 100-foot shelter, connected by an elevated pedestrian bridge. A larger parking lot would be built on the east side of the tracks to supplement the existing park-and-ride lot.

On January 12, 2015, the state announced that $5.75 million in funding would be made available for environmental mitigation and design at ten Hartford Line and New Haven Line stations, including North Haven as well as Enfield, West Hartford and Newington. In December 2015, funding for the Hartford Line was secured by the state, and the service launched on June 16, 2018. As of January 2017, design is half complete, with the intention to begin the 18-month construction phase in mid-2018. The state aims to complete all infill stations on the line by 2022. In February 2017, the state announced an additional $50 million in funds, including money to complete design of North Haven station.

By October 2021, construction of the $52 million station was scheduled to start in April 2023 and be completed in December 2024. As of July 2025, the project is expected to be advertised for bidding in February 2026.
