= Enfield High School =

High school in Connecticut

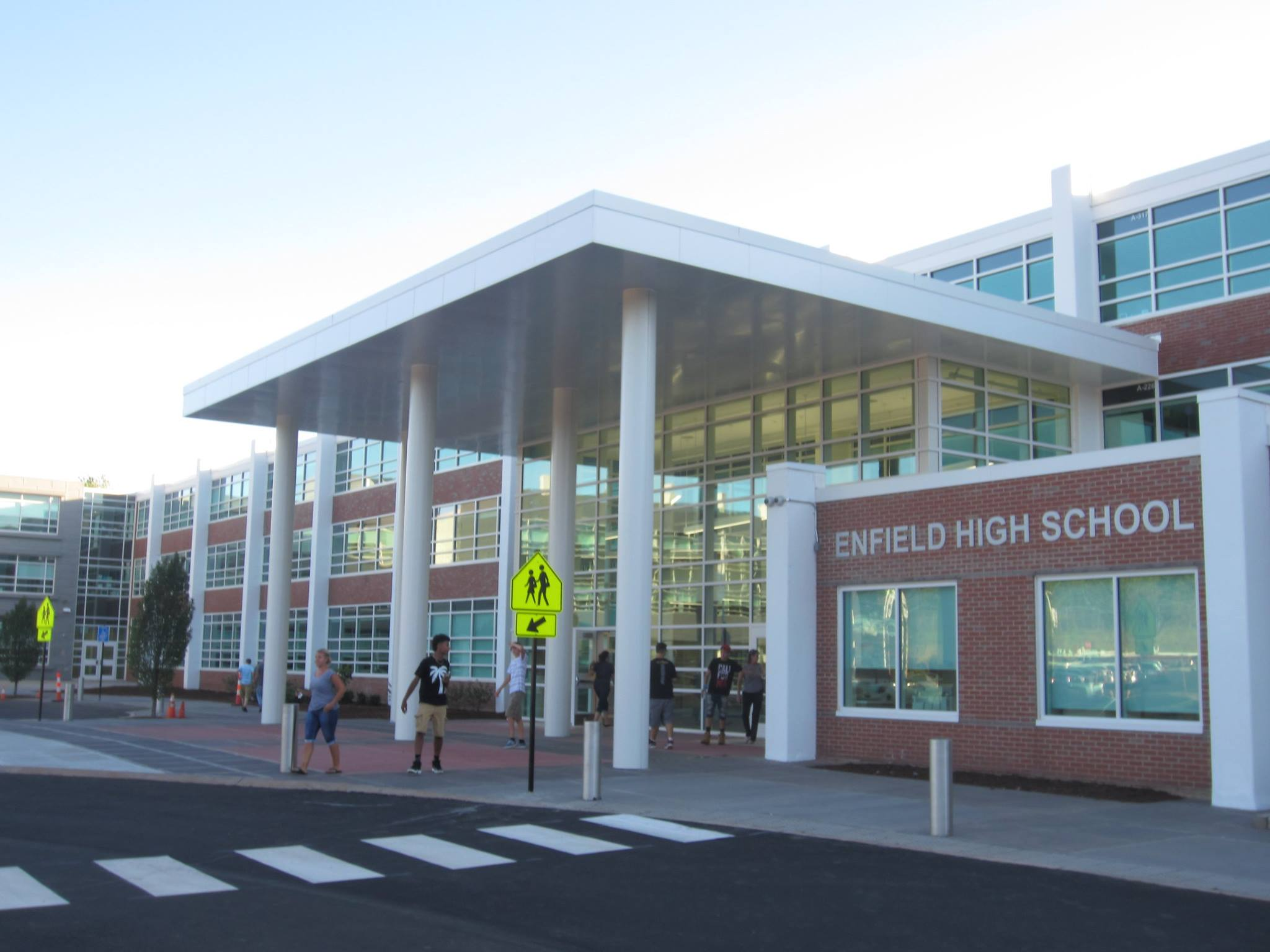

Location
- 1264 Enfield Street; Enfield, Connecticut 06082; United States; 41°58′47″N 72°35′48″W

Information
- Type: Public high school
- Motto: "Soaring to Success"
- Established: 1893 (133 years ago)
- School district: Enfield Public Schools
- CEEB code: 070790
- Principal: Erin Clark
- Teaching staff: 121.20 (on an FTE basis)
- Grades: 9-12
- Enrollment: 1,481 (2023–2024)
- Student to teacher ratio: 12.22
- Colors: Forest green, Vegas gold, white, black
- Mascot: Eagle
- Website: enfieldhigh.sharpschool.com

Enfield High School is a secondary school established in 1893 in Enfield, Connecticut. The Enfield High School campus is located in the Connecticut River Valley, on Enfield Street (U.S. Route 5) in Enfield's Historical District. The school has an enrollment of approximately 1400 students. The present facility was erected in 1964 on Enfield Street. The facility underwent a $6.2 million renovation and library addition completed in 2005, and a $103 million "as-new" renovation and significant expansion completed in 2017. In May 2010, Enfield High School and Enrico Fermi High School underwent a consolidation process as part of the restructuring and improvement plan of Enfield Public Schools. Enfield High School operates as the town's sole high school, which houses both students from Enfield High School and the previous Enrico Fermi High School, which closed its doors in 2016.

== Enfield High School Complex ==
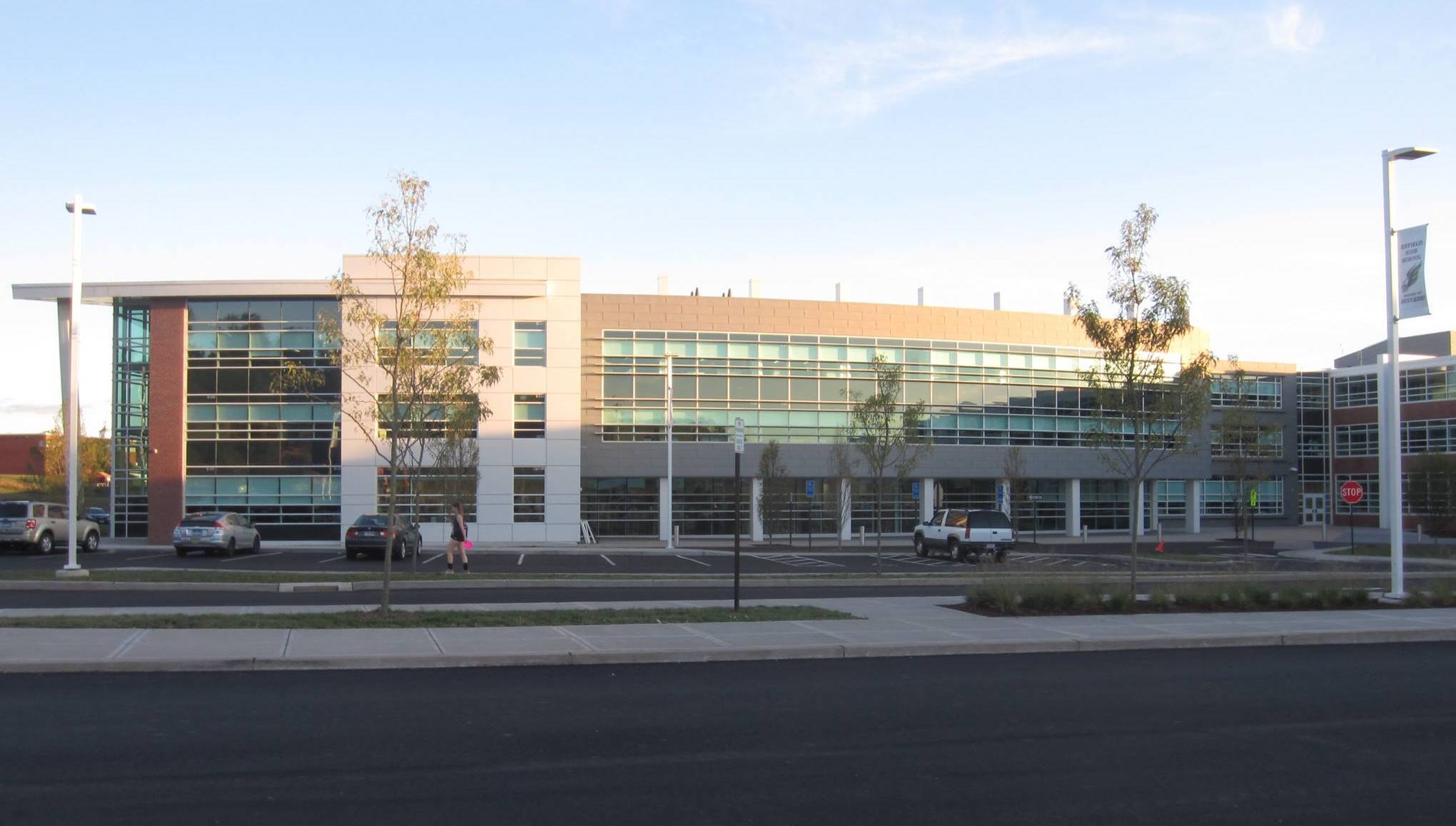
Enfield High School's Enrico Fermi STEAM Wing, a 120,000 sq. ft. addition, was named after the town's former Enrico Fermi High School, which closed its doors in 2016.

The school has more than 113 classrooms (all equipped with smart board projectors and technology), a school store, a career center suite, guidance suite, conference spaces, student break-out study/collaborative rooms, weight and cardio rooms, an industrial culinary kitchen, outdoor patio cafe, a cafeteria for 700 students, and a 120,000-square-foot wing designed for science, technology, engineering, arts and mathematics classes. A performing arts music wing includes an auditorium and theatre that can seat nearly 1,000 people, and has expansive performing/practice space.

== Athletics ==
Every student is encouraged to participate in one or more sports on the Freshmen, Junior Varsity, or Varsity level. Enfield High School is part of the Central Connecticut Conference.

Fall

Cheerleading (V)
Cross country
Field hockey
Football (F, JV, V)
Soccer — boys and girls
Swimming — girls (V)
Volleyball — girls

Winter

Basketball — boys and girls
Ice hockey (V) — boys
Indoor track — boys and girls
Swimming — boys (V)
Wrestling — boys

Spring

Baseball
Golf — boys and girls
Lacrosse - boys (V) and girls
Outdoor track — boys and girls (V)
Softball
Tennis — boys and girls (V)
Volleyball — boys

== Notable events ==
=== Security ===
During the 2000s, Enfield High School has restructured and updated its security and discipline policies. After events such as the September 11th attacks, the Columbine High School Massacre, the Virginia Tech Shootings, and Sandy Hook Elementary School shootings, the school has vowed to make the school a safe and welcoming learning environment for students and staff, through increased security measures, practices of the school lock-down procedure, through the use of security checkpoints, and protective school windows and technological improvements to limit and secure entry into the building.

In April 2007, a student was arrested for violently threatening other classmates. After several complaints and reports, police investigated his home to find a hit list of more than a dozen names. The fifteen-year-old student was immediately arrested and charged with a breach of peace. The student had apparently been bullied and hoped "to get even."

=== Water main break of 2008 ===
After the Christmas break and the 2008 New Year, Enfield High School was closed for five extra days due to a water main break underneath the school which flooded the entire A, B, and C buildings, the lower basement level, the auditorium, and the gymnasium. As a result of the damage, the gymnasium and the auditorium were rendered useless. The water had caused the floors to buckle in the gymnasium, while mold grew in the auditorium. The damage also caused two fires at the main building, one in the basement, and one in the gymnasium.

Days lost due to the flood and fires at Enfield High were made up during April vacation per request of the State of Connecticut's mandatory 180-day school year. During the summer of 2008, the school campus was under full construction. The new athletic fields were finished by fall of 2008, the new gymnasium floors were completed for the school opening, and the damaged lecture halls were completed in January 2009.

Enfield High School's Graduating Class of 2008. Enfield High School became a subject of national debate in 2010 as to whether it was constitutional to hold a public school's graduation at a religious edifice. The American Civil Liberties Union sued the Enfield Board of Education.

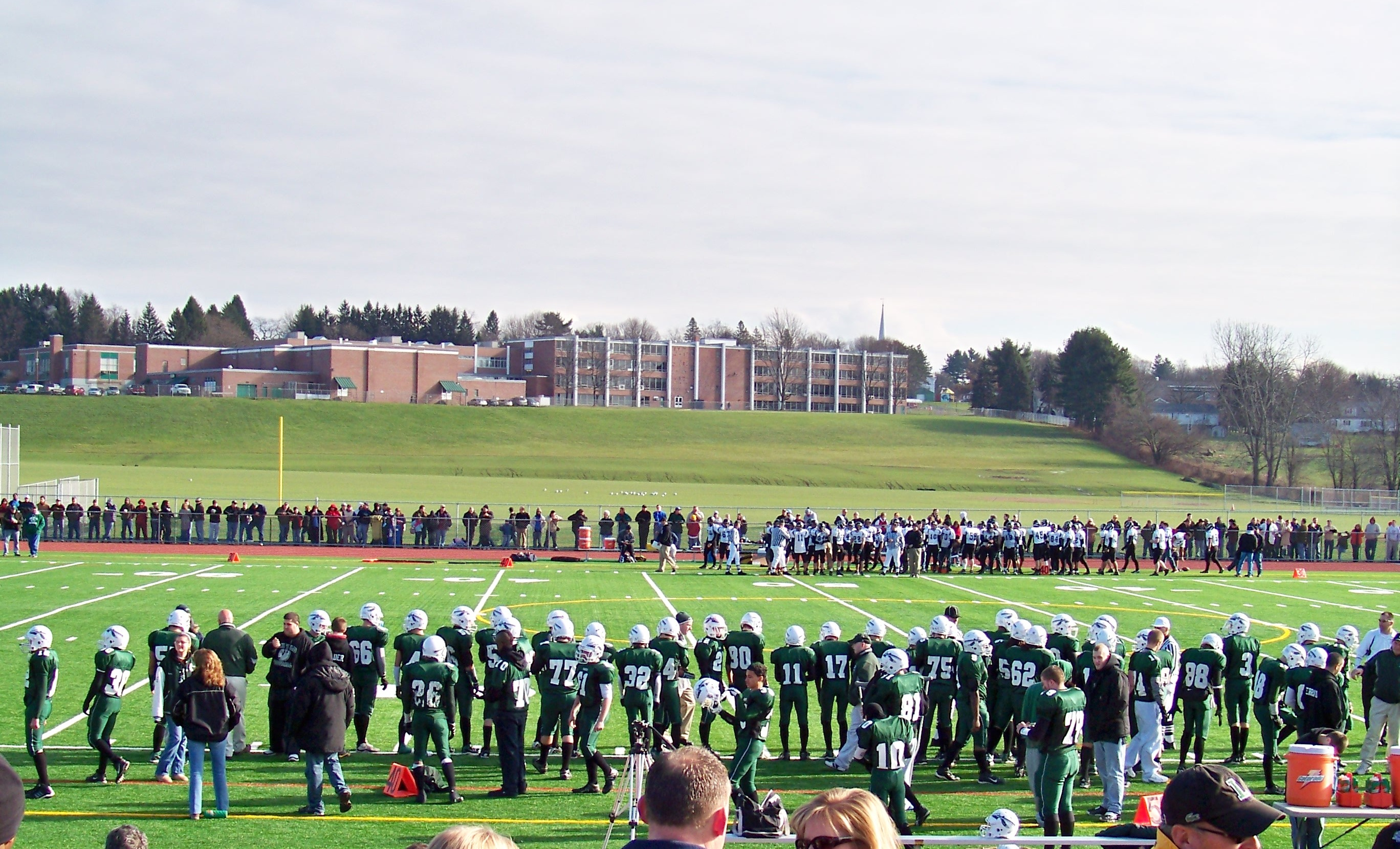
Annual Thanksgiving Football Game in 2008

Enfield High School featured on WFSB's Cool Schools in May 2009.

=== Accreditation status ===
Enfield High School is accredited by the New England Association of Schools and Colleges. In 1995, the school was placed on "warning status" due to inadequate facilities, poor condition of the sports complex, safety concerns, low teacher morale, and the vagueness of the school's mission statement. Issues of concern from the New England Association of Schools and Colleges were addressed with the construction of renovated classroom space and the library expansion in 2005. In 2006, while Enfield High School passed accreditation, the New England Association of Schools and Colleges cited additional issues concerning insufficient storage space, improper balance and inadequate ventilation between rooms through the HVAC system, and poor condition of the school's science labs. If the school's accreditation status is lost, legitimate colleges generally will not accept students from an unaccredited high school. Controversy amongst town residents has called for a major restructuring and consolidation of the town's schools in order to improve education and effective allocation of the town's resources to its schools. In 2016, the town's high schools consolidated into a newly expanded and renovated high school building.

=== Consolidation of Enfield High School and Enrico Fermi High School ===
The Town of Enfield and its Board of Education voted in May 2010 for the redistricting of Enfield Public Schools and consolidation of the town's two high schools due to decreases in student enrollment. From the 1970s through 2016, the Enfield Public School district consisted of two high schools. During a 2012 study, student population trends projected through the year 2021 showed significant decreases. Enrollment data from the most recent Prowda, Ph.D. Report, released February 19, 2012, indicated that high school age enrollment for the town of Enfield has fallen from 2075 students in 2008 to 1812 students in the recently completed 2011–12 school year. Future Prowda enrollment projections show further declines to 1575 students in 2015 and 1334 students by the year 2020. Enrico Fermi High School opened in 1971 not long after the present Enfield High School opened due to large graduating classes of the baby boomer generation when double sessions were required and graduating classes exceeded 700 students each session. Graduating sizes for each school today are presently around 200 students. As of 2012, Enfield High School enrolled approximately 800 students while Enrico Fermi High School enrolled approximately 1,000 students. In 2016, both high schools merged into Enfield High School with an enrollment of approximately 1400 students.

In 2010, Enrico Fermi High School was considered for the location of the consolidated high school. However, the facility's location on a corner lot prevented further expansion without expanding onto the newly renovated fields. Furthermore, the school's contaminated soils were capped in 2007. If expansion were to occur, the town would have to incur millions of dollars in expense for the remediation of the contaminated soils on the Enrico Fermi High School location. Enfield High School's campus allowed for a sizable expansion of the building. Additionally, the town still owes a bond for the 2005 library expansion. Per the Board of Education vote on January 10, 2012, to approve Enfield High School as the location of the future consolidated high school.

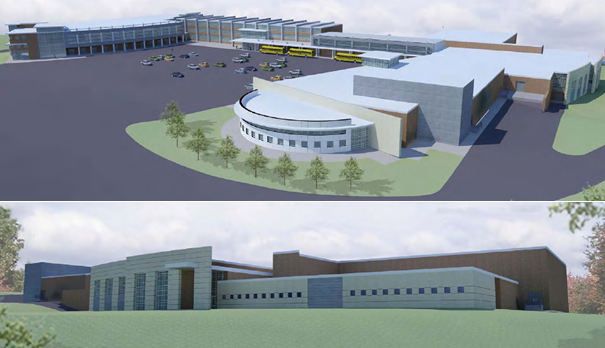
Rendering of the expanded and renovated Enfield High School for consolidation. Proposed expansion will double the square footage of the building. With enrollment at 1,400 at the time of consolidation (the year 2016) as the student population continues to decrease, the facility will be able to comfortably hold 1,600 students.

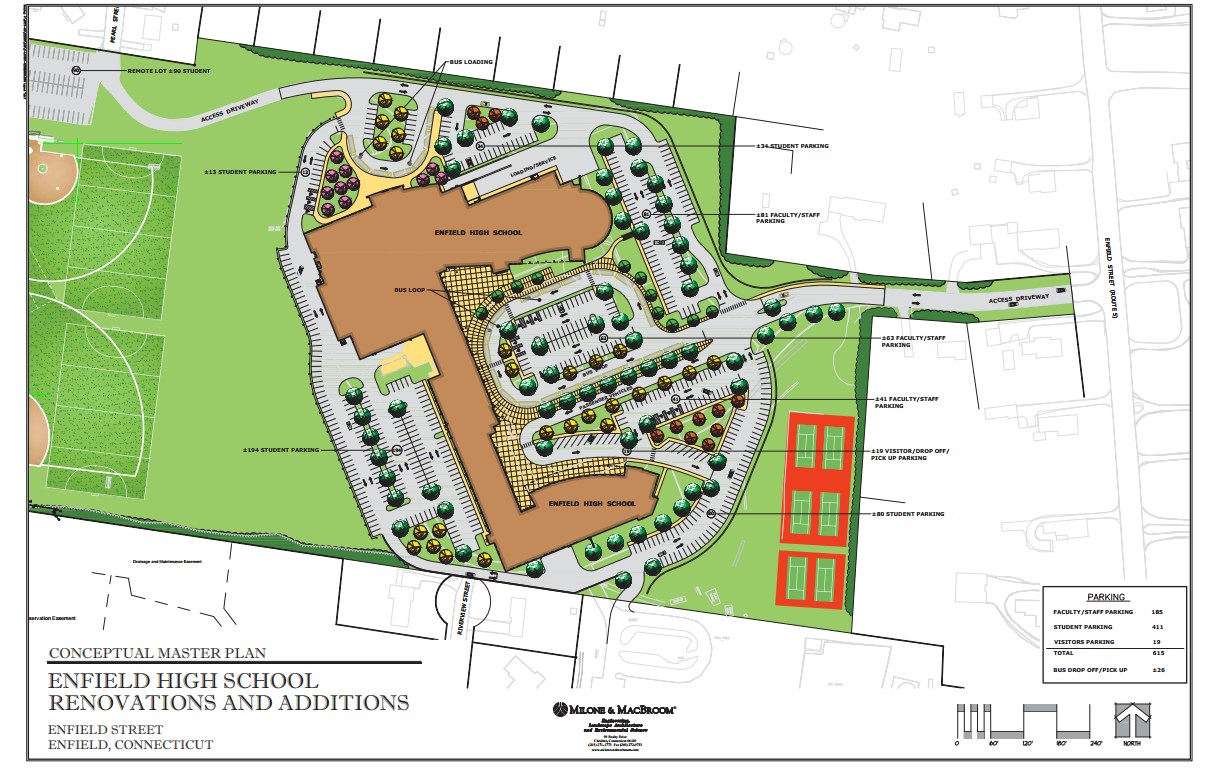
Site plan of the consolidated Enfield High School. Landscaping and campus planning would address traffic and parking concerns while beautifying the campus.

Plans for the consolidated building at Enfield High School by the firm, Silver Petrucelli & Associates, and construction company, Gilbane, called for a four floor "STEAM" (Science, Technology, Engineering, Art, Mathematics) wing addition to the south end of the building off A-wing which will include state-of-the-art science labs and classrooms. A-wing will see a "like-new" renovation, as well the rest of the facility, that would gut the entire building to its core structure and will construct updated classrooms. A grand lobby with a tiered glass enclosure is proposed for the main entrance. B-wing plans to house an expanded guidance department and career services office. Expansion to the gymnasium out of the north end of the building will result in renovated locker rooms and health classrooms; and cardio, wellness, and weight rooms. Expansion to the cafeteria and auditorium will double their size. Renovations to C-wing also include a second lobby for the performing arts music wing with expanded music classrooms, practice rooms, and offices. The entire building will be implemented with advanced technology and air-conditioning. Site-plans reworked campus landscaping, traffic flow, and parking spaces for faculty and students. The total cost of construction for the expansion and renovation to Enfield High School is approximately $103 million. However, with a reimbursement rate from the State of Connecticut at approximately 73% the town will pay a share of approximately $35 million, bonded over 20 years. The closing of Enrico Fermi High School as a school will result in approximately $2 million in savings each year. Plans state that savings from the closing of one high school will pay for the 20 year bond, according to the Enfield Pre-Referendum High School Consolidation Committee. If the referendum did not pass, Enfield's two high schools would have remained open, but would have required limited renovations for updates to each facility at a cost of $50 million each, which would not be reimbursable by the state, in order to adhere to the State of Connecticut's new educational mandates that go into effect in 2017. Moreover, issues with Americans with Disabilities Act regulations had to be addressed in both buildings. The referendum went to town's voters in November 2012, and passed by a 2:1 margin.

The consolidation plans to save money because the town will no longer have two high school budgets. Academically, the plan is seen as high priority in order to improve the town's educational system on the secondary level. Because the current high school curriculum split between two high schools, a curriculum of a consolidated high school will allow for more expanded vocational studies, flexible scheduling, and a competitive curriculum with diverse course offerings. Talks of consolidation have been ongoing since May 2010, a referendum passed in 2012, and construction began in 2014. Enfield High School and Fermi High School merged in 2016 school year.

Boys' Basketball Team wins its State Championship in 2010.

On May 25, 2010, Enfield Schools voted on the concept of a single high school and a middle school for sixth through eighth-graders. Enfield Schools also approved reconfiguring all the elementary schools, which could lead to the closing of two elementary school facilities. The Strategic Planning Committee recommended redrawing school districts in 2011 by having separate schools for pre-K to second grade and grades 3-5 and to account for the single middle and high schools. The closed elementary schools were closed and reused for other town purposes.

=== Colors, mascot, and symbol ===
Prior to the two high schools' consolidation in 2016, town residents have questioned the new school name, colors, and mascot. Controversy in the past with Enfield High School's discriminatory "Raider" mascot has forced the new high school to either stay with Enrico Fermi's "Falcon" mascot or adopt a new one. Sports leagues regulations also have strict guidelines on mascots found offensive by different minority groups.

The mascot "Chief Wahoo", was taken away after complaints from a teacher were received concerning the controversy of its presentation. The students have shown much dissatisfaction and would like him returned. The school administration currently does not allow the use of the Raider mascot during public events. However, until 2016, the school still used the Raider logo on the basketball court, school flyers and notices and school sponsored events.

In February 2013, the Enfield Board of Education voted for the Eagle to be the consolidated high school's new mascot. A survey was taken of 1,500 students from Enfield High School, Fermi High School, and John F. Kennedy Middle School as an opinion to influence a final decision to be made by the Board. As a result of the survey, top choices for mascots were the Falcon, Eagle, and Spartan. Top color choices were and blue/gold and black/green/gold, which the school board favored and subsequently adopted. The decision for the Eagle was influenced by the presence of American bald eagles on the property, which occasionally make an appearance during sporting events and school gatherings.

== Notable alumni and staff ==
- Michael Arietti - diplomat and U.S. ambassador.
- John Ashton - actor.
- Kevin Foxe - film director, producer, and writer.
- Craig Janney - NHL hockey player.
- Peter King - Senior Writer for Sports Illustrated.
- Karen Scavotto - Olympic archer.
- The Last Goodnight - members of the band are originally from Enfield.
