= Carol Hall (politician) =

American politician

Member of the Connecticut House of Representatives from the 59th district
- Incumbent
- Assumed office January 4, 2017
- Preceded by: David Kiner
- Succeeded by: Rick Leborious (elect)

Personal details
- Born: 1960 (age 65–66)
- Party: Republican/Independent
- Spouse: Fred Hall
- Children: 3
- Education: Eastern Connecticut State University

Carol Hall (born 1960) is a Republican member of the Connecticut House of Representatives. She represents the 59th district.
