= Sherwood Manor, Connecticut =

Census-designated place in Connecticut, United States

- Census-designated place
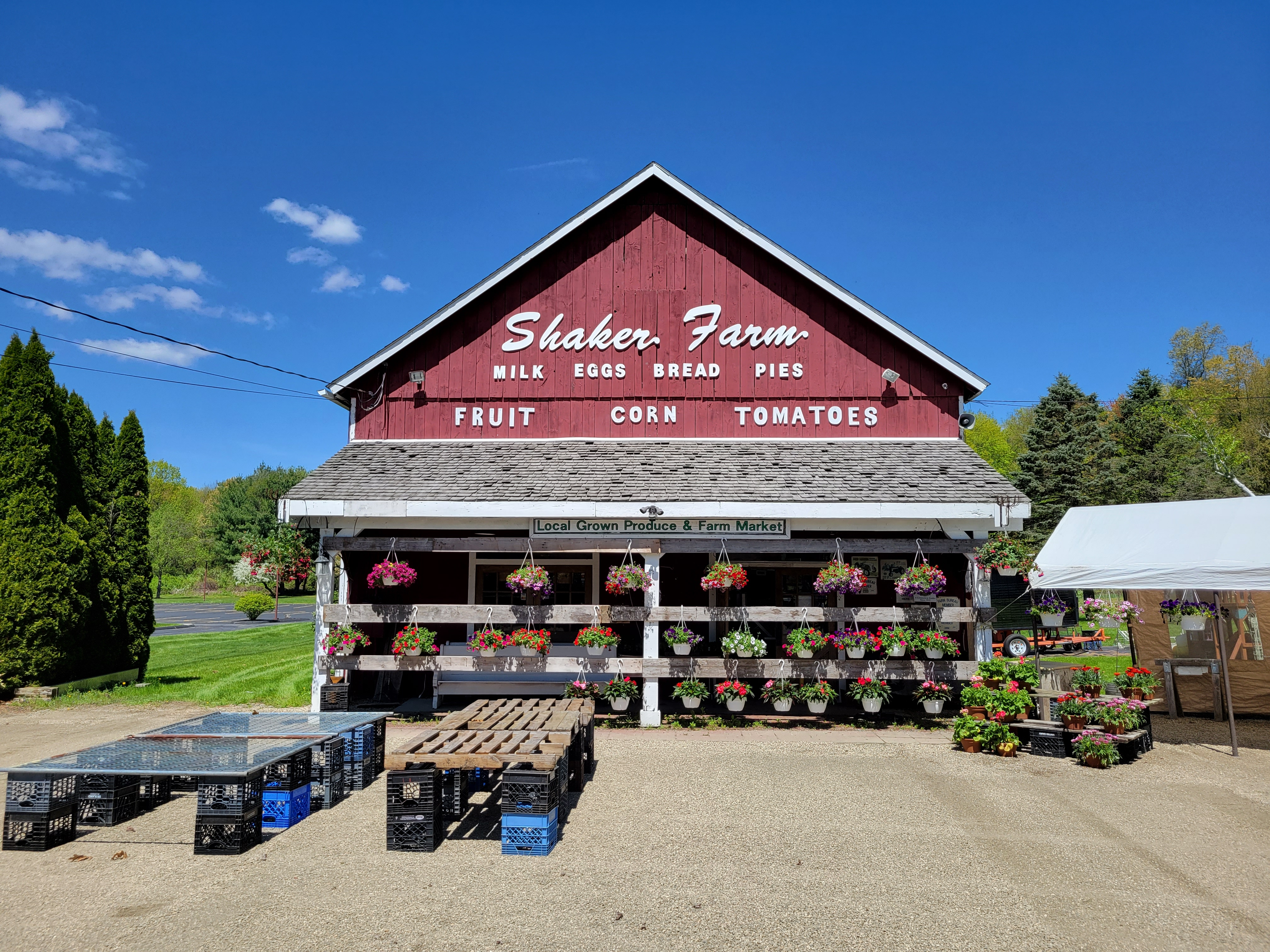
- Shaker Farm

- Location within Connecticut Location within the United States
- Coordinates: 42°0′48″N 72°33′51″W
- Country: United States
- State: Connecticut
- County: Hartford
- Town: Enfield

Area
  - Total: 3.1 sq mi (8.1 km^{2})
  - Land: 3.1 sq mi (8.1 km^{2})
  - Water: 0 sq mi (0 km^{2})
- Elevation: 140 ft (43 m)

Population (2010)
  - Total: 5,410
  - Density: 1,700/sq mi (670/km^{2})
- Time zone: UTC-5 (Eastern)
  - Summer (DST): UTC-4 (Eastern)
- ZIP code: 06082
- Area code: 860
- FIPS code: 09-68450
- GNIS feature ID: 2377860

Sherwood Manor is a census-designated place (CDP) within the town of Enfield, Connecticut, United States. As of the 2020 census, Sherwood Manor had a population of 5,372.

== Geography ==
The CDP is in the northern part of the town of Enfield, bordered to the west by Interstate 91, to the north, partially by Brainard Road, to the east by Connecticut Route 192 (North Maple Street), and to the south by Connecticut Route 220 (Elm Street/Shaker Road). Thompsonville borders Sherwood Manor to the west, across I-91. Hazardville is 2 miles (3 km) to the southeast, and Longmeadow, Massachusetts, is 3 miles (5 km) to the north.

According to the United States Census Bureau, the CDP has a total area of 3.1 square miles (8.1 km^{2}), all land.

== Demographics ==
=== 2020 census ===
As of the 2020 census, Sherwood Manor had a population of 5,372. The median age was 46.8 years. 16.4% of residents were under the age of 18 and 21.4% of residents were 65 years of age or older. For every 100 females there were 93.5 males, and for every 100 females age 18 and over there were 90.7 males age 18 and over.

100.0% of residents lived in urban areas, while 0.0% lived in rural areas.

There were 2,365 households in Sherwood Manor, of which 22.4% had children under the age of 18 living in them. Of all households, 47.4% were married-couple households, 17.5% were households with a male householder and no spouse or partner present, and 26.9% were households with a female householder and no spouse or partner present. About 29.3% of all households were made up of individuals and 13.1% had someone living alone who was 65 years of age or older.

There were 2,441 housing units, of which 3.1% were vacant. The homeowner vacancy rate was 1.3% and the rental vacancy rate was 3.1%.

Racial composition as of the 2020 census
Race	Number	Percent
White	4,596	85.6%
Black or African American	156	2.9%
American Indian and Alaska Native	5	0.1%
Asian	146	2.7%
Native Hawaiian and Other Pacific Islander	0	0.0%
Some other race	85	1.6%
Two or more races	384	7.1%
Hispanic or Latino (of any race)	338	6.3%

=== 2000 census ===
As of the census of 2000, there were 5,689 people, 2,184 households, and 1,644 families residing in the CDP. The population density was 1,818.5 inhabitants per square mile (702.1/km^{2}). There were 2,230 housing units at an average density of 712.8 per square mile (275.2/km^{2}). The racial makeup of the CDP was 96.47% White, 1.14% African American, 0.05% Native American, 1.07% Asian, 0.47% from other races, and 0.79% from two or more races. Hispanic or Latino of any race were 1.83% of the population.

There were 2,184 households, out of which 28.5% had children under the age of 18 living with them, 65.0% were married couples living together, 7.4% had a female householder with no husband present, and 24.7% were non-families. 19.6% of all households were made up of individuals, and 8.4% had someone living alone who was 65 years of age or older. The average household size was 2.60 and the average family size was 3.01.

In the CDP, the population was spread out, with 22.6% under the age of 18, 6.0% from 18 to 24, 28.9% from 25 to 44, 26.9% from 45 to 64, and 15.5% who were 65 years of age or older. The median age was 40 years. For every 100 females, there were 94.4 males. For every 100 females age 18 and over, there were 93.2 males.

The median income for a household in the CDP was $56,641, and the median income for a family was $62,019. Males had a median income of $46,118 versus $32,500 for females. The per capita income for the CDP was $24,839. About 1.1% of families and 1.6% of the population were below the poverty line, including 0.5% of those under age 18 and 3.3% of those age 65 or over.
