= Bradley House =

Bradley House or variants thereof may refer to:

== In England ==
- Bradley (house), a medieval manor house in Devon
- Bradley House, Wiltshire, a historic house in Wiltshire

== In the United States ==
- Bradley-Hubbell House, a historic house in Easton, Connecticut
- Bradley–Wheeler House, a historic house in Westport, Connecticut
- Dan Bradley House, a historic house in Marcellus, New York
- Bradley House (Midland, Michigan), a historic house and museum
- Radka–Bradley House, a historic house and museum in Rogers City, Michigan
- J.D.C. Bradley House, a historic house in Southborough, Massachusetts
- J. S. Bradley House, Portland, Oregon, listed on the National Register of Historic Places
- Harold C. Bradley House, a historic house in Madison, Wisconsin
- B. Harley Bradley House, a historic house in Kankakee, Illinois, designed by Frank Lloyd Wright

== See also ==
- Bradley Octagon House, a historic house in Niagara Falls, Ontario
