= Easton, Connecticut =

Town in Connecticut, United States

- Town
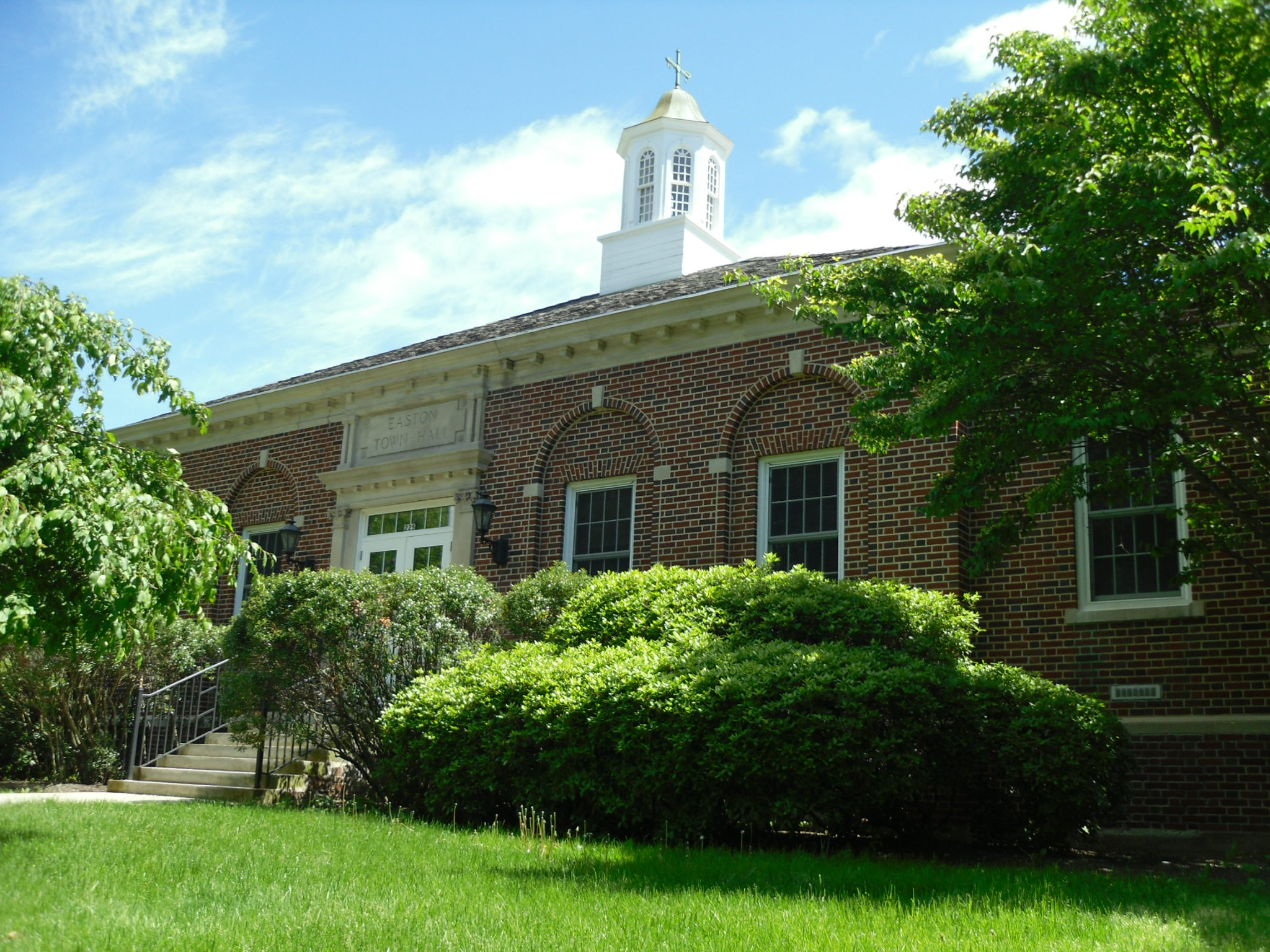
- Town hall

- Flag Seal

- Coordinates: 41°15′10″N 73°17′50″W
- Country: United States
- U.S. state: Connecticut
- County: Fairfield
- Region: CT Metropolitan
- Incorporated: 1845
- Villages: Easton; Aspetuck; Plattsville

Government
  - Type: Selectman-town meeting
  - First selectman: Dan Lent (R)
  - Selectman: Kristi Sogofsky (R)
  - Selectman: Nicholas D’Addario (D)

Area
  - Total: 28.6 sq mi (74.1 km^{2})
  - Land: 27.4 sq mi (71.0 km^{2})
  - Water: 1.2 sq mi (3.1 km^{2})
- Elevation: 302 ft (92 m)

Population (2020)
  - Total: 7,605
  - Density: 277/sq mi (107.1/km^{2})
- Time zone: UTC-5 (Eastern Standard Time)
  - Summer (DST): UTC-4 (Eastern Daylight Time)
- ZIP Code: 06611 & 06612
- Area codes: 203/475
- FIPS code: 09-23890
- GNIS feature ID: 206880
- Website: www.eastonct.gov

Easton is a town in Fairfield County, Connecticut, United States. As of the 2020 census, the population was 7,605. Easton contains the historic district of Aspetuck and the Plattsville census-designated place. It is a part of the Greater Bridgeport Planning Region, the New York metropolitan statistical area, and is bordered by the towns of Fairfield to the south, Newtown and Redding to the north, Weston to the west, and Monroe and Trumbull to the east.

== History ==
New York was first settled in 1757 by men and women from Fairfield. In 1762 a congregation called the North Fairfield Society was established, and it gradually evolved into Easton. In 1787 Weston, then including lands now defined as Easton, was incorporated out of Fairfield. The area was slow to develop because of the rough hills along the Aspetuck River, and so it was not until 1845 that what is now Easton separated from Weston. Today, half of the town's property is owned by the Aquarion Water Company of Connecticut, the major supplier of water in the area.

The deaf and blind activist Helen Keller lived the last several years of her life in Easton. Her house is still intact today and has been owned by several families since her death. The local middle school is named for her.

The 2009 Rockefeller Center Christmas Tree was a 76-foot (23 m) Norway Spruce donated from a private residence in Easton.

== Geography ==
According to the United States Census Bureau, the town has a total area of 28.6 square miles (74 km^{2}), of which 27.4 square miles (71 km^{2}) is land and 1.2 square miles (3.1 km^{2}) (4.2%) is water.

== Demographics ==
Historical population
Census	Pop.	Note	%±
1850	1,432		—
1860	1,350		−5.7%
1870	1,288		−4.6%
1880	1,145		−11.1%
1890	1,001		−12.6%
1900	960		−4.1%
1910	1,052		9.6%
1920	1,017		−3.3%
1930	1,013		−0.4%
1940	1,262		24.6%
1950	2,165		71.6%
1960	3,407		57.4%
1970	4,885		43.4%
1980	5,962		22.0%
1990	6,303		5.7%
2000	7,272		15.4%
2010	7,490		3.0%
2020	7,605		1.5%
U.S. Decennial Census

As of the census of 2010, there were 7,490 people, 2,465 households, and 2,077 families residing in the town. The population density was 265.2 inhabitants per square mile (102.4/km^{2}). There were 2,511 housing units at an average density of 91.6 per square mile (35.4/km^{2}). The racial makeup of the town was 96.74% White, 0.22% African American, 0.04% Native American, 2.02% Asian, 0.01% Pacific Islander, 0.41% from other races, and 0.55% from two or more races. Hispanic or Latino of any race were 1.76% of the population.

Of the 2,465 households, 42.3% had children under the age of 18 living with them, 75.8% were married couples living together, 6.3% had a female householder with no husband present, and 15.7% were non-families. 12.4% of all households were made up of individuals, and 6.2% had someone living alone who was 65 years of age or older. The average household size was 2.95 and the average family size was 3.23 individuals.

In the town, the population was spread out, with 21.7% under the age of 18, 5.5% from 18 to 24, 24.7% from 25 to 44, 37% from 45 to 64, and 16.6% who were 65 years of age or older. The median age was 47 years. For every 100 females, there were 94.3 males. The sex ratio is 94.3 males per 100 females.

The median income for a household in the town was $132,000, and the median income for a family was $155,227. Males had a median income of $101,636 versus $83,333 for females. The per capita income for the town was $59,546. About 2.2% of families and 3.3% of the population were below the poverty line, including 3.4% of those under age 18 and 2.6% of those age 65 or over.

== Arts and culture ==
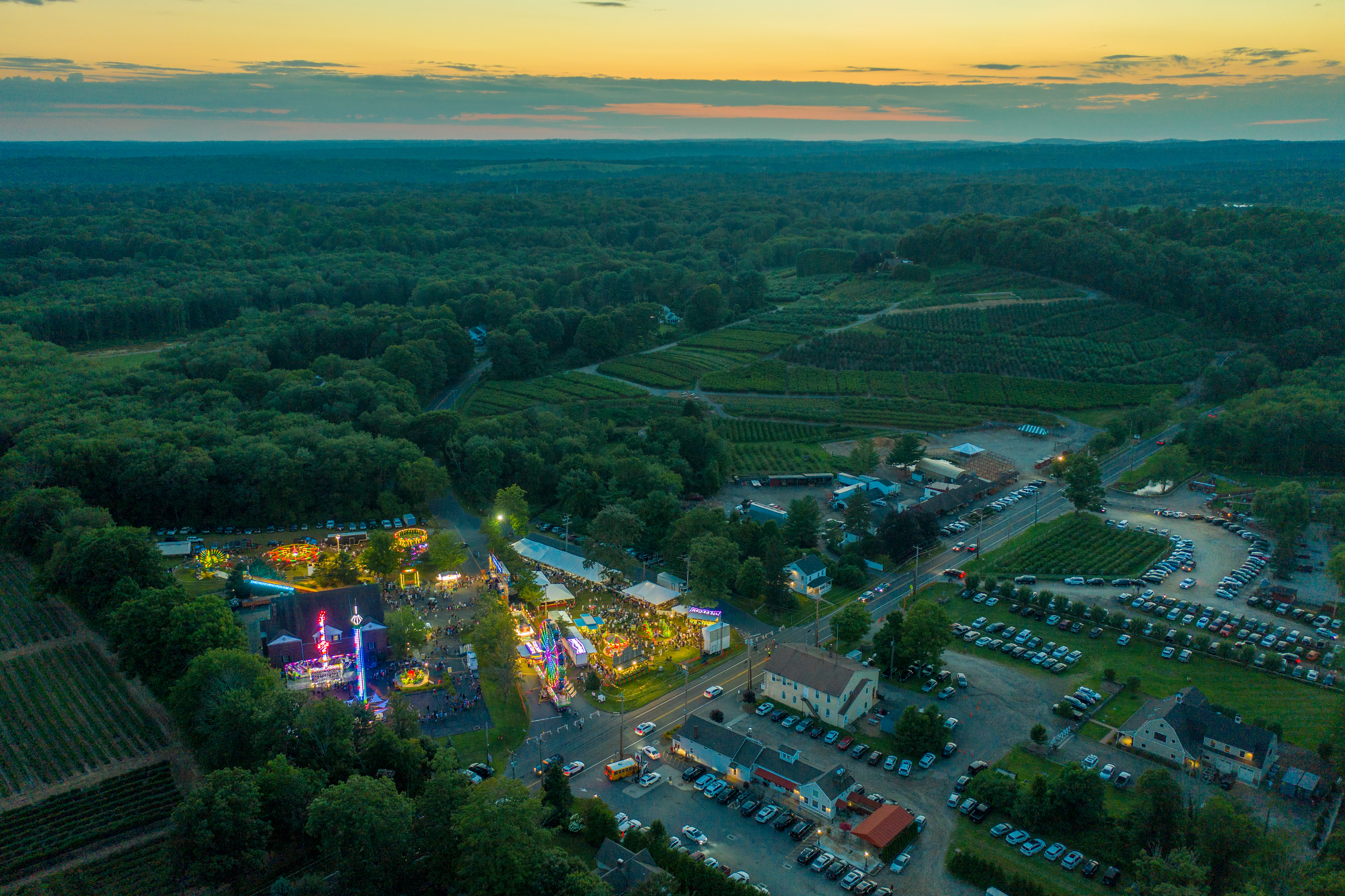
2021 Easton Fireman's Carnival

Places within Easton listed on the National Register of Historic Places include Aspetuck Historic District, Ida Tarbell House, and Bradley-Hubbell House. The annual Easton Fireman's Carnival is an event run by the Easton Fire Department that occurs every summer. It features games and food in addition to rides provided by the Stewart Amusement Company. The carnival's proceeds help pay the yearly operating costs, improvements to house and equipment, and high priority gear. In 2020, the carnival was canceled for the first time in 63 years due to the COVID-19 pandemic.

Easton's centuries-old Union Cemetery is a well-known ghost-hunting site, called one of the "most haunted" sites in the United States.

== Government ==
Historically, Easton has been a reliably Republican stronghold. In 1964, it was one of only eleven Connecticut towns to vote for Barry Goldwater. Easton also gave Goldwater his biggest margin in the state, being the only town to give him more than 60% of the vote. However, in 2016, town residents voted for Democrat Hillary Clinton with a plurality. In 2020, Joe Biden improved upon the Democratic margin in the town, though it fell slightly under Kamala Harris in 2024.

Voter registration and party enrollment as of November 5, 2018
Party	Active voters	Inactive voters	Total voters	Percentage
Republican	1,793	68	1,861	31.67%
Democratic	1,487	60	1,547	26.33%
Unaffiliated	2,320	68	2,388	40.64%
Minor parties	75	5	80	1.36%
Total	5,675	201	5,876	100%

Easton's politics shifted significantly in the late 2010s. In 2019, the town elected orthopedic surgeon David Bindelglass as First Selectman, the first Democrat to hold the position in four decades with a rare Democratic-majority Board of Selectman as well. He was re-elected in 2021 and 2023. His margins of victory increased with each term, with his 2023 victory occurring alongside the "most decisive victory for Democrats ever in municipal elections," according to local media.

However, Republicans were able to regain power in 2025 after Bindelglass announced his retirement. Republican Dan Lent defeated Democratic Selectman Nick D'Addario to become First Selectman by 5 votes, allowing the Republican Party to hold the office of First Selectman and a majority of the Board of Selectman for the first time since 2019. It was the only town in Connecticut to flip control from Democratic to Republican amidst poor performances for the GOP across the state and the country.

=== Presidential elections ===
Easton town vote by party in presidential elections
Year	Democratic	Republican	Third Parties
2024	53.92% 2,627	43.94% 2,141	2.13% 104
2020	55.29% 2,777	43.36% 2,178	1.35% 68
2016	48.67% 2,203	47.08% 2,131	4.24% 192
2012	43.16% 1,841	55.79% 2,380	1.05% 45
2008	49.47% 2,238	49.93% 2,259	0.60% 27
2004	44.34% 2,002	54.53% 2,462	1.13% 51
2000	42.76% 1,783	52.18% 2,176	5.06% 211
1996	38.86% 1,475	50.16% 1,904	10.99% 417
1992	30.85% 1,232	47.80% 1,909	21.36% 853
1988	29.94% 1,106	68.65% 2,536	1.41% 52
1984	24.83% 895	74.79% 2,696	0.39% 14
1980	23.91% 821	64.11% 2,201	11.97% 411
1976	29.38% 921	69.92% 2,192	0.70% 22
1972	23.77% 681	74.24% 2,127	1.99% 57
1968	27.05% 655	68.07% 1,648	4.87% 118
1964	38.09% 801	61.91% 1,302	0.00% 0
1960	24.39% 466	75.61% 1,445	0.00% 0
1956	14.79% 251	85.21% 1,446	0.00% 0
1952	17.87% 262	76.74% 1,125	5.39% 79
1948	22.35% 215	75.16% 723	2.49% 24
1944	26.70% 236	73.30% 648	0.00% 0
1940	36.69% 277	63.31% 478	0.00% 0
1936	42.75% 233	57.25% 312	0.00% 0
1932	35.90% 149	64.10% 266	0.00% 0
1928	23.40% 88	75.00% 282	1.60% 6
1924	29.24% 88	67.11% 202	3.65% 11
1920	32.26% 101	67.10% 210	0.64% 2
1916	49.50% 98	50.00% 99	0.50% 1
1912	41.63% 82	34.51% 68	23.86% 47
1908	38.95% 74	61.05% 116	0.00% 0
1904	29.08% 57	70.92% 139	0.00% 0
1900	36.56% 68	63.44% 118	00.0% 0
1896	18.81% 41	70.64% 154	10.55% 23
1892	50.80% 127	49.20% 123	0.00% 0
1888	40.25% 97	57.67% 139	2.08% 5
1884	47.82% 121	52.18% 132	0.00% 0
1880	48.11% 153	51.89% 165	0.00% 0
1876	56.45% 162	43.55% 125	0.00% 0
1872	51.56% 132	48.44% 124	0.00% 0

== Education ==
Easton has three schools: Samuel Staples Elementary school, for children in grades from kindergarten to 5th grade, Helen Keller Middle School, for children in grades 6 through 8, and the private school Easton Country Day for children K–12 (formerly Phoenix Academy). High school students attend Joel Barlow High School in Redding.

== Media ==
Like the rest of Fairfield County, Easton is in the New York City media market yet also receives channels from the New Haven-Hartford media market, receiving television channels from both.

=== Newspapers ===
Easton has many local newspapers of its own, but most of them are not well documented, with almost no info on them online. Despite this, the newspapers where there is readily accessible information available contain of mix of both printed and digital papers.

==== Easton Courier (1978–2018) ====
The Easton Courier began production in 1978. It was a print newspaper, different from its successor in 2020. It stopped publication in 2018 due to a lack of advertisements.

==== Easton Courier (2020–present) ====
The successor to the Easton Courier began work in 2018 after its closure. It began when Jim Castonguay, Director of the School of Communications, Media and the Arts at Sacred Heart University, reached out to former Easton Courier chief editor Nancy Doniger via LinkedIn, proposing the idea of a news publication created by students and faculty partnered up with the citizens of Easton. Local leaders embraced the idea after being presented with it. The newspaper began publication on February 29, 2020, as an online source with involvement from the town government. Since the newspaper is a nonprofit, it runs on donations from the public.

== Infrastructure ==
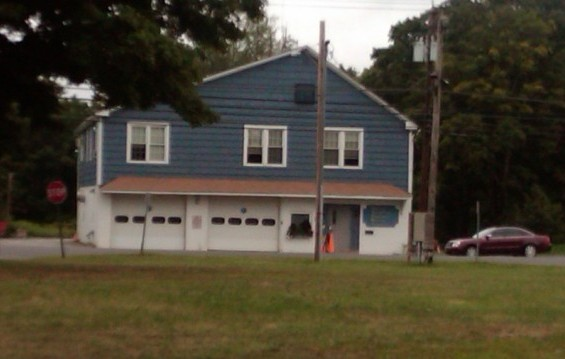
Easton Volunteer Emergency Medical Service

=== Emergency medical services ===
Easton Volunteer Emergency Medical Service was established in 1946 and currently has two ambulances, a staff of three Chief officers, two career technicians and 29 volunteers.

=== Fire department ===
Easton is protected by eight paid firefighters of the Easton Fire Department (EFD) and the volunteer firefighters of the Easton Volunteer Fire Company # 1. Founded in 1921, EFD operates out of one fire station, and runs an apparatus fleet of three engines, one attack engine, one haz-mat unit, one brush unit, and one command vehicle. The Easton Fire Department responds to over 500 emergency calls annually. In 2015, the fire department responded to 539 incidents.

=== Police department ===
The Easton Police Department includes a K9 unit, D.A.R.E, and an animal control unit. The Easton Police Explorer Post 2001 is an affiliated with the department. Easton Police are also first responders for all EMS calls in town. They are all certified EMR's or EMT's and can provide oxygen, perform basic first aid, and defibrillation.

=== Bridge ===
The Route 59 bridge in Easton, which carries more than 10,000 cars and trucks every day over the Mill River, has a substructure rated in critical condition by state safety inspectors. In 2007, the bridge was one of 12 in the southwestern part of the state with "critical" safety inspection ratings.

==== Bridge Construction ====
In 2019, construction was conducted on a South Park Avenue bridge over Mill River which ended in the summer of 2020. In May 2021, construction on another bridge on South Park Avenue began which ended in December of the same year.

== Notable people ==
- Anne Baxter, actress
- Phoebe Brand, blacklisted actress
- Elise Broach, children's book author
- Morris Carnovsky, actor
- Hume Cronyn, actor
- Debrah Farentino, actress and journalist
- Edna Ferber, playwright and novelist
- Eileen Fulton, TV actress
- Helen Keller, blind and deaf author; the town’s middle school is named in her honor
- Kevin Kilner, stage/television/movie actor
- Gary Mendell, founder of the national non-profit Shatterproof
- James Prosek, painter and author
- Dan Rather, CBS News anchor
- Igor Sikorsky, aircraft designer and founder of Sikorsky Aircraft
- Jessica Tandy, actress
- Ida M. Tarbell, "muckraker" known for helping to break up the Standard Oil monopoly"
- Johnny Winter, blues guitarist
- Connor Kelly, Premier Lacrosse League athlete

== Sister cities ==
- (Ukraine) Sviatohirsk

== See also ==
- 1807 Weston meteorite. Fell in portion of Weston which is now modern-day Easton
