= 1928 United States presidential election in Connecticut =

- November 6, 1928
- Turnout: 90.78%

Nominee	Herbert Hoover	Al Smith
Party	Republican	Democratic
Home state	California	New York
Running mate	Charles Curtis	Joseph Taylor Robinson
Electoral vote	7	0
Popular vote	296,641	252,085
Percentage	53.63%	45.57%

Hoover
50–60%
60–70%
70–80%
80–90%
Smith
40–50%
50–60%
60–70%
70–80%
President before election
Calvin Coolidge
Republican
Elected President
Herbert Hoover
Republican

The 1928 United States presidential election in Connecticut took place on November 6, 1928, as part of the 1928 United States presidential election which was held throughout all contemporary 48 states. Voters chose seven representatives, or electors to the Electoral College, who voted for president and vice president.

During the Third Party System, Connecticut was one of a small number of critical swing states due to its opposing Democratic Catholic and Republican Yankee populations being closely matched at the polls. However, the fear William Jennings Bryan generated amongst the northeastern industrial elite, and among Catholic voters who belonged to a church that condemned free silver, meant that after the “Panic of 1893” Connecticut became substantially a one-party Republican state, although not to the same degree as many states in upper New England, the Midwest or the Pacific. No Democrat would serve as a United States Senator from the state during the “System of 1896”, and only one Democrat would serve as Governor — the aging Simeon E. Baldwin.

In 1920 and 1924 Democratic nominees James M. Cox and John W. Davis had carried only one and three towns respectively in Connecticut, with Southern Democrat Davis winning only 27.53 percent of the state's vote. However, in 1928, the Democratic Party nominated Alfred E. Smith, a New York City-born Roman Catholic of Irish, Italian, and German immigrant heritage, who appealed greatly to the urban ethnic and Catholic immigrant populations that populated northeastern states like Connecticut. Smith was the first Catholic ever to be nominated for president on a major party presidential ticket, and while his Catholicism greatly weakened his candidacy in many rural parts of the United States, especially in the traditionally Democratic “Solid South” and the pro-La Follette (Note: After La Follette, who in 1924 won one-sixth of the national vote and almost one-third in the one-party Republican Pacific States, died in June 1925, his family endorsed Smith.) Pacific Northwest, Catholics across the United States identified with him greatly.

In straw poll from late September, Republican nominees, former Secretary of Commerce Herbert Hoover of California and Senate Majority Leader Charles Curtis of Kansas, was narrowly leading Smith and Senator Joseph Taylor Robinson of Arkansas. However, another straw poll from early October saw Hoover leading Smith in Connecticut by more than two-to-one, and a similar result was obtained in a larger poll mid-month. The Boston Globe in the second week also saw Hoover carrying the state, as did a later poll that nonetheless thought Smith was helped in Connecticut by his opposition to Prohibition.

Hoover ultimately won Connecticut by 8.06 percentage points; however, this was a major Democratic advance on the 1920 and 1924 results when the Republicans won by 34 and 30 points respectively, with Smith carrying seventeen towns that voted for Calvin Coolidge in 1924. Most critically, Smith carried the four most populous towns of Hartford, (Note: As of the 2020 presidential election, Hartford has never voted for a Republican presidential candidate since this election.) New London, Bridgeport and Waterbury. He also became the first Democrat ever to carry the towns of Enfield and Putnam and the first since 1852 to carry Plainfield and Thompson, all of which were home to large Catholic populations. Whereas in 1924 Connecticut had been Coolidge's seventh-best state, in 1928 it was Catholic Smith's fourteenth-best state of forty-eight, and voted 9.36 points more Democratic than the nation at-large, this being the first time since 1892 that Connecticut had been more Democratic than the nation.

== Results ==
1928 United States presidential election in Connecticut
Party	Candidate	Running mate	Popular vote		Electoral vote	
Party	Candidate	Running mate	Count	%	Count	%
Republican	Herbert Hoover of California	Charles Curtis of Kansas	296,641	53.63%	7	100.00%
Democratic	Al Smith of New York	Joseph Taylor Robinson of Arkansas	252,085	45.57%	0	0.00%
Socialist	Norman Thomas of New York	James Hudson Maurer of Pennsylvania	3,029	0.55%	0	0.00%
Communist	William Z. Foster of Massachusetts	Benjamin Gitlow of New York	738	0.13%	0	0.00%
Socialist Labor	Verne L. Reynolds of Michigan	Jeremiah D. Crowley of New York	625	0.10%	0	0.00%
N/A	Others	Others	6	0.01%	0	0.00%
Total			553,124	100.00%	7	100.00%

=== By county ===
1928 United States presidential election in Connecticut (by county)
County	Hoover %	Hoover #	Smith %	Smith #	Others %	Others #	Margin %	Margin #	Total #
Fairfield	55.8%	71,388	43.4%	55,488	0.8%	1,043	15,900	12.4%	127,919
Hartford	53.2%	75,997	46.0%	65,789	0.8%	1,167	10,208	7.2%	142,953
Litchfield	63.7%	19,154	35.8%	10,761	0.5%	138	8,393	27.9%	30,053
Middlesex	59.9%	11,204	39.5%	7,380	0.6%	112	3,824	20.4%	18,696
New Haven	49.1%	80,952	50.1%	82,623	0.9%	1,435	-1,671	-1.0%	165,010
New London	56.3%	21,378	42.9%	16,297	0.8%	288	5,081	13.4%	37,963
Tolland	59.8%	6,502	39.1%	4,255	1.1%	125	2,247	20.7%	10,882
Windham	51.4%	10,039	48.3%	9,447	0.3%	63	592	3.1%	19,549

=== By town ===
1928 United States presidential election in Connecticut (by town)
Town	Herbert Clark Hoover Republican		Alfred Emmanuel Smith Democratic		Norman Mattoon Thomas Socialist		William Zebulon Foster Communist		Verne L. Reynolds Socialist Labor		Margin		Total votes cast
Town	#	%	#	%	#	%	#	%	#	%	#	%	Total votes cast
Andover	126	61.46%	78	38.05%	1	0.49%	0	0.00%	0	0.00%	48	23.41%	205
Ansonia	3,209	49.05%	3,269	49.97%	51	0.78%	5	0.08%	8	0.12%	-60	-0.92%	6,542
Ashford	145	54.31%	120	44.94%	2	0.75%	0	0.00%	0	0.00%	25	9.36%	267
Avon	369	67.34%	172	31.39%	5	0.91%	1	0.18%	1	0.18%	197	35.95%	548
Barkhamsted	241	78.25%	66	21.43%	1	0.32%	0	0.00%	0	0.00%	175	56.82%	308
Beacon Falls	310	57.94%	217	40.56%	1	0.19%	7	1.31%	0	0.00%	93	17.38%	535
Berlin	1,032	66.11%	521	33.38%	2	0.13%	4	0.26%	2	0.13%	511	32.74%	1,561
Bethany	119	74.38%	40	25.00%	1	0.63%	0	0.00%	0	0.00%	79	49.38%	160
Bethel	1,313	68.92%	588	30.87%	4	0.21%	0	0.00%	0	0.00%	725	38.06%	1,905
Bethlehem	187	80.26%	46	19.74%	0	0.00%	0	0.00%	0	0.00%	141	60.52%	233
Bloomfield	683	60.98%	404	36.07%	18	1.61%	8	0.71%	7	0.63%	279	24.91%	1,120
Bolton	121	62.37%	73	37.63%	0	0.00%	0	0.00%	0	0.00%	48	24.74%	194
Bozrah	169	47.21%	186	51.96%	1	0.28%	1	0.28%	1	0.28%	-17	-4.75%	358
Branford	1,826	64.32%	1,001	35.26%	6	0.21%	5	0.18%	1	0.04%	825	29.06%	2,839
Bridgeport	21,019	45.69%	24,448	53.14%	372	0.81%	85	0.18%	82	0.18%	-3,429	-7.45%	46,006
Bridgewater	163	74.09%	56	25.45%	1	0.45%	0	0.00%	0	0.00%	107	48.64%	220
Bristol	5,028	59.10%	3,404	40.01%	55	0.65%	16	0.19%	4	0.05%	1,624	19.09%	8,507
Brookfield	313	75.06%	104	24.94%	0	0.00%	0	0.00%	0	0.00%	209	50.12%	417
Brooklyn	346	49.50%	352	50.36%	1	0.14%	0	0.00%	0	0.00%	-6	-0.86%	699
Burlington	205	65.50%	104	33.23%	2	0.64%	2	0.64%	0	0.00%	101	32.27%	313
Canaan	190	74.51%	65	25.49%	0	0.00%	0	0.00%	0	0.00%	125	49.02%	255
Canterbury	208	68.20%	92	30.16%	4	1.31%	1	0.33%	0	0.00%	116	38.03%	305
Canton	689	69.95%	291	29.54%	5	0.51%	0	0.00%	0	0.00%	398	40.41%	985
Chaplin	119	75.32%	36	22.78%	2	1.27%	1	0.63%	0	0.00%	83	52.53%	158
Cheshire	941	75.22%	310	24.78%	0	0.00%	0	0.00%	0	0.00%	631	50.44%	1,251
Chester	387	64.50%	211	35.17%	2	0.33%	0	0.00%	0	0.00%	176	29.33%	600
Clinton	521	74.64%	173	24.79%	4	0.57%	0	0.00%	0	0.00%	348	49.86%	698
Colchester	373	54.93%	299	44.04%	6	0.88%	1	0.15%	0	0.00%	74	10.90%	679
Colebrook	181	73.58%	65	26.42%	0	0.00%	0	0.00%	0	0.00%	116	47.15%	246
Columbia	149	62.61%	87	36.55%	2	0.84%	0	0.00%	0	0.00%	62	26.05%	238
Cornwall	298	76.02%	91	23.21%	3	0.77%	0	0.00%	0	0.00%	207	52.81%	392
Coventry	465	63.87%	262	35.99%	1	0.14%	0	0.00%	0	0.00%	203	27.88%	728
Cromwell	659	69.22%	287	30.15%	1	0.11%	3	0.32%	2	0.21%	372	39.08%	952
Danbury	5,974	54.76%	4,895	44.87%	23	0.21%	13	0.12%	4	0.04%	1,079	9.89%	10,909
Darien	1,681	73.44%	598	26.12%	7	0.31%	0	0.00%	3	0.13%	1,083	47.31%	2,289
Derby	1,151	33.12%	2,294	66.01%	27	0.78%	2	0.06%	1	0.03%	-1,143	-32.89%	3,475
Durham	360	79.65%	92	20.35%	0	0.00%	0	0.00%	0	0.00%	268	59.29%	452
East Granby	202	66.89%	97	32.12%	0	0.00%	2	0.66%	1	0.33%	105	34.77%	302
East Haddam	476	65.03%	253	34.56%	3	0.41%	0	0.00%	0	0.00%	223	30.46%	732
East Hampton	713	55.57%	566	44.12%	2	0.16%	2	0.16%	0	0.00%	147	11.46%	1,283
East Hartford	3,506	56.02%	2,725	43.54%	13	0.21%	6	0.10%	8	0.13%	781	12.48%	6,258
East Haven	1,506	63.95%	829	35.20%	13	0.55%	4	0.17%	3	0.13%	677	28.75%	2,355
East Lyme	617	73.10%	219	25.95%	7	0.83%	1	0.12%	0	0.00%	398	47.16%	844
East Windsor	757	61.85%	452	36.93%	13	1.06%	2	0.16%	0	0.00%	305	24.92%	1,224
Eastford	171	83.01%	35	16.99%	0	0.00%	0	0.00%	0	0.00%	136	66.02%	206
Easton	282	75.00%	88	23.40%	5	1.33%	1	0.27%	0	0.00%	194	51.60%	376
Ellington	473	60.72%	298	38.25%	4	0.51%	0	0.00%	4	0.51%	175	22.46%	779
Enfield	1,861	44.01%	2,362	55.85%	4	0.09%	2	0.05%	0	0.00%	-501	-11.85%	4,229
Essex	918	73.91%	318	25.60%	4	0.32%	2	0.16%	0	0.00%	600	48.31%	1,242
Fairfield	3,041	63.66%	1,698	35.55%	30	0.63%	4	0.08%	4	0.08%	1,343	28.11%	4,777
Farmington	1,008	54.02%	849	45.50%	9	0.48%	0	0.00%	0	0.00%	159	8.52%	1,866
Franklin	142	72.82%	53	27.18%	0	0.00%	0	0.00%	0	0.00%	89	45.64%	195
Glastonbury	1,258	59.34%	852	40.19%	8	0.38%	2	0.09%	0	0.00%	406	19.15%	2,120
Goshen	185	82.96%	37	16.59%	1	0.45%	0	0.00%	0	0.00%	148	66.37%	223
Granby	462	85.40%	78	14.42%	1	0.18%	0	0.00%	0	0.00%	384	70.98%	541
Greenwich	6,413	65.29%	3,363	34.24%	38	0.39%	5	0.05%	3	0.03%	3,050	31.05%	9,822
Griswold	603	43.54%	778	56.17%	4	0.29%	0	0.00%	0	0.00%	-175	-12.64%	1,385
Groton	2,427	77.15%	704	22.38%	12	0.38%	3	0.10%	0	0.00%	1,723	54.77%	3,146
Guilford	886	68.63%	401	31.06%	2	0.15%	2	0.15%	0	0.00%	485	37.57%	1,291
Haddam	546	75.31%	176	24.28%	3	0.41%	0	0.00%	0	0.00%	370	51.03%	725
Hamden	4,122	64.90%	2,163	34.06%	55	0.87%	3	0.05%	8	0.13%	1,959	30.85%	6,351
Hampton	177	79.37%	44	19.73%	0	0.00%	0	0.00%	2	0.90%	133	59.64%	223
Hartford	25,351	43.75%	32,102	55.40%	280	0.48%	117	0.20%	101	0.17%	-6,751	-11.65%	57,951
Hartland	108	81.82%	23	17.42%	0	0.00%	1	0.76%	0	0.00%	85	64.39%	132
Harwinton	220	76.39%	67	23.26%	1	0.35%	0	0.00%	0	0.00%	153	53.13%	288
Hebron	193	64.12%	108	35.88%	0	0.00%	0	0.00%	0	0.00%	85	28.24%	301
Kent	312	68.12%	146	31.88%	0	0.00%	0	0.00%	0	0.00%	166	36.24%	458
Killingly	1,557	53.75%	1,334	46.05%	5	0.17%	0	0.00%	1	0.03%	223	7.70%	2,897
Killingworth	99	64.71%	53	34.64%	1	0.65%	0	0.00%	0	0.00%	46	30.07%	153
Lebanon	344	81.90%	75	17.86%	1	0.24%	0	0.00%	0	0.00%	269	64.05%	420
Ledyard	261	83.92%	49	15.76%	1	0.32%	0	0.00%	0	0.00%	212	68.17%	311
Lisbon	219	67.18%	105	32.21%	2	0.61%	0	0.00%	0	0.00%	114	34.97%	326
Litchfield	979	65.18%	514	34.22%	6	0.40%	1	0.07%	2	0.13%	465	30.96%	1,502
Lyme	219	85.55%	34	13.28%	2	0.78%	0	0.00%	1	0.39%	185	72.27%	256
Madison	656	71.15%	264	28.63%	2	0.22%	0	0.00%	0	0.00%	392	42.52%	922
Manchester	5,205	67.30%	2,473	31.98%	48	0.62%	6	0.08%	2	0.03%	2,732	35.32%	7,734
Mansfield	696	76.23%	209	22.89%	8	0.88%	0	0.00%	0	0.00%	487	53.34%	913
Marlborough	70	47.62%	71	48.30%	3	2.04%	1	0.68%	2	1.36%	-1	-0.68%	147
Meriden	8,204	52.46%	7,329	46.86%	71	0.45%	20	0.13%	15	0.10%	875	5.59%	15,639
Middlebury	366	80.26%	88	19.30%	2	0.44%	0	0.00%	0	0.00%	278	60.96%	456
Middlefield	231	76.49%	70	23.18%	0	0.00%	1	0.33%	0	0.00%	161	53.31%	302
Middletown	3,980	51.18%	3,738	48.06%	37	0.48%	8	0.10%	14	0.18%	242	3.11%	7,777
Milford	3,536	67.82%	1,618	31.03%	48	0.92%	6	0.12%	6	0.12%	1,918	36.79%	5,214
Monroe	362	69.88%	151	29.15%	2	0.39%	0	0.00%	3	0.58%	211	40.73%	518
Montville	664	60.69%	425	38.85%	3	0.27%	2	0.18%	0	0.00%	239	21.85%	1,094
Morris	160	68.67%	73	31.33%	0	0.00%	0	0.00%	0	0.00%	87	37.34%	233
Naugatuck	2,459	46.59%	2,773	52.54%	24	0.45%	9	0.17%	13	0.25%	-314	-5.95%	5,278
New Britain	10,116	50.34%	9,703	48.28%	222	1.10%	20	0.10%	35	0.17%	413	2.06%	20,096
New Canaan	1,298	67.53%	614	31.95%	6	0.31%	2	0.10%	2	0.10%	684	35.59%	1,922
New Fairfield	155	76.35%	48	23.65%	0	0.00%	0	0.00%	0	0.00%	107	52.71%	203
New Hartford	435	58.78%	304	41.08%	1	0.14%	0	0.00%	0	0.00%	131	17.70%	740
New Haven	24,898	42.87%	32,531	56.01%	490	0.84%	103	0.18%	58	0.10%	-7,633	-13.14%	58,080
New London	4,668	51.61%	4,309	47.64%	53	0.59%	8	0.09%	6	0.07%	359	3.97%	9,044
New Milford	1,441	68.23%	659	31.20%	8	0.38%	3	0.14%	1	0.05%	782	37.03%	2,112
Newington	879	76.17%	262	22.70%	11	0.95%	1	0.09%	1	0.09%	617	53.47%	1,154
Newtown	663	52.45%	599	47.39%	1	0.08%	1	0.08%	0	0.00%	64	5.06%	1,264
Norfolk	461	57.55%	340	42.45%	0	0.00%	0	0.00%	0	0.00%	121	15.11%	801
North Branford	231	65.25%	122	34.46%	0	0.00%	0	0.00%	1	0.28%	109	30.79%	354
North Canaan	644	70.69%	264	28.98%	0	0.00%	1	0.11%	2	0.22%	380	41.71%	911
North Haven	960	77.80%	265	21.47%	8	0.65%	1	0.08%	0	0.00%	695	56.32%	1,234
North Stonington	320	79.40%	79	19.60%	3	0.74%	1	0.25%	0	0.00%	241	59.80%	403
Norwalk	7,865	61.32%	4,867	37.95%	38	0.30%	15	0.12%	41	0.32%	2,998	23.37%	12,826
Norwich	5,329	47.53%	5,788	51.62%	77	0.69%	7	0.06%	12	0.11%	-459	-4.09%	11,213
Old Lyme	398	72.63%	147	26.82%	2	0.36%	0	0.00%	1	0.18%	251	45.80%	548
Old Saybrook	459	65.20%	244	34.66%	1	0.14%	0	0.00%	0	0.00%	215	30.54%	704
Orange	469	84.20%	88	15.80%	0	0.00%	0	0.00%	0	0.00%	381	68.40%	557
Oxford	272	73.32%	98	26.42%	1	0.27%	0	0.00%	0	0.00%	174	46.90%	371
Plainfield	1,238	42.54%	1,659	57.01%	11	0.38%	1	0.03%	1	0.03%	-421	-14.47%	2,910
Plainville	1,418	70.51%	581	28.89%	7	0.35%	2	0.10%	3	0.15%	837	41.62%	2,011
Plymouth	981	59.64%	654	39.76%	7	0.43%	3	0.18%	0	0.00%	327	19.88%	1,645
Pomfret	427	62.43%	256	37.43%	0	0.00%	0	0.00%	1	0.15%	171	25.00%	684
Portland	950	55.33%	755	43.97%	11	0.64%	1	0.06%	0	0.00%	195	11.36%	1,717
Preston	357	78.63%	95	20.93%	1	0.22%	1	0.22%	0	0.00%	262	57.71%	454
Prospect	138	73.80%	48	25.67%	1	0.53%	0	0.00%	0	0.00%	90	48.13%	187
Putnam	1,289	46.07%	1,501	53.65%	8	0.29%	0	0.00%	0	0.00%	-212	-7.58%	2,798
Redding	488	69.12%	218	30.88%	0	0.00%	0	0.00%	0	0.00%	270	38.24%	706
Ridgefield	955	73.46%	341	26.23%	2	0.15%	2	0.15%	0	0.00%	614	47.23%	1,300
Rocky Hill	486	68.74%	216	30.55%	5	0.71%	0	0.00%	0	0.00%	270	38.19%	707
Roxbury	180	64.29%	98	35.00%	1	0.36%	1	0.36%	0	0.00%	82	29.29%	280
Salem	87	71.90%	34	28.10%	0	0.00%	0	0.00%	0	0.00%	53	43.80%	121
Salisbury	841	70.85%	339	28.56%	5	0.42%	0	0.00%	2	0.17%	502	42.29%	1,187
Saybrook	584	63.27%	335	36.29%	3	0.33%	0	0.00%	1	0.11%	249	26.98%	923
Scotland	128	78.05%	36	21.95%	0	0.00%	0	0.00%	0	0.00%	92	56.10%	164
Seymour	1,433	70.07%	606	29.63%	3	0.15%	2	0.10%	1	0.05%	827	40.44%	2,045
Sharon	503	77.98%	137	21.24%	3	0.47%	2	0.31%	0	0.00%	366	56.74%	645
Shelton	1,959	57.47%	1,406	41.24%	30	0.88%	6	0.18%	8	0.23%	553	16.22%	3,409
Sherman	99	69.72%	40	28.17%	1	0.70%	1	0.70%	1	0.70%	59	41.55%	142
Simsbury	695	60.49%	450	39.16%	1	0.09%	1	0.09%	2	0.17%	245	21.32%	1,149
Somers	422	62.33%	252	37.22%	3	0.44%	0	0.00%	0	0.00%	170	25.11%	677
South Windsor	459	56.60%	344	42.42%	6	0.74%	2	0.25%	0	0.00%	115	14.18%	811
Southbury	358	73.66%	127	26.13%	0	0.00%	1	0.21%	0	0.00%	231	47.53%	486
Southington	1,611	53.90%	1,369	45.80%	6	0.20%	2	0.07%	1	0.03%	242	8.10%	2,989
Sprague	365	40.92%	524	58.74%	3	0.34%	0	0.00%	0	0.00%	-159	-17.83%	892
Stafford	1,134	51.20%	1,060	47.86%	13	0.59%	2	0.09%	6	0.27%	74	3.34%	2,215
Stamford	10,014	54.84%	8,106	44.39%	71	0.39%	50	0.27%	20	0.11%	1,908	10.45%	18,261
Sterling	330	61.80%	202	37.83%	2	0.37%	0	0.00%	0	0.00%	128	23.97%	534
Stonington	2,565	57.22%	1,876	41.85%	28	0.62%	7	0.16%	7	0.16%	689	15.37%	4,483
Stratford	4,089	67.13%	1,965	32.26%	23	0.38%	9	0.15%	5	0.08%	2,124	34.87%	6,091
Suffield	1,037	70.21%	438	29.65%	0	0.00%	0	0.00%	2	0.14%	599	40.56%	1,477
Thomaston	1,058	63.62%	599	36.02%	6	0.36%	0	0.00%	0	0.00%	459	27.60%	1,663
Thompson	716	48.44%	757	51.22%	3	0.20%	1	0.07%	1	0.07%	-41	-2.77%	1,478
Tolland	256	58.99%	173	39.86%	3	0.69%	0	0.00%	2	0.46%	83	19.12%	434
Torrington	4,433	54.13%	3,702	45.21%	24	0.29%	23	0.28%	7	0.09%	731	8.93%	8,189
Trumbull	883	73.95%	305	25.54%	4	0.34%	1	0.08%	1	0.08%	578	48.41%	1,194
Union	81	76.42%	25	23.58%	0	0.00%	0	0.00%	0	0.00%	56	52.83%	106
Vernon	2,053	55.92%	1,544	42.06%	49	1.33%	11	0.30%	14	0.38%	509	13.87%	3,671
Voluntown	98	45.37%	115	53.24%	1	0.46%	2	0.93%	0	0.00%	-17	-7.87%	216
Wallingford	2,663	52.05%	2,417	47.24%	28	0.55%	4	0.08%	4	0.08%	246	4.81%	5,116
Warren	86	66.15%	42	32.31%	2	1.54%	0	0.00%	0	0.00%	44	33.85%	130
Washington	640	72.15%	245	27.62%	2	0.23%	0	0.00%	0	0.00%	395	44.53%	887
Waterbury	13,846	41.43%	19,363	57.93%	163	0.49%	30	0.09%	20	0.06%	-5,517	-16.51%	33,422
Waterford	1,153	72.93%	405	25.62%	20	1.27%	2	0.13%	1	0.06%	748	47.31%	1,581
Watertown	1,620	72.42%	610	27.27%	4	0.18%	3	0.13%	0	0.00%	1,010	45.15%	2,237
West Hartford	7,090	71.98%	2,721	27.62%	30	0.30%	6	0.06%	3	0.03%	4,369	44.36%	9,850
West Haven	5,703	57.09%	4,201	42.05%	55	0.55%	10	0.10%	21	0.21%	1,502	15.04%	9,990
Westbrook	322	73.18%	109	24.77%	7	1.59%	0	0.00%	2	0.45%	213	48.41%	440
Weston	257	73.43%	89	25.43%	2	0.57%	2	0.57%	0	0.00%	168	48.00%	350
Westport	1,628	67.52%	775	32.14%	4	0.17%	2	0.08%	2	0.08%	853	35.38%	2,411
Wethersfield	2,144	76.43%	649	23.14%	11	0.39%	1	0.04%	0	0.00%	1,495	53.30%	2,805
Willington	333	78.72%	87	20.57%	1	0.24%	1	0.24%	1	0.24%	246	58.16%	423
Wilton	659	77.53%	185	21.76%	4	0.47%	1	0.12%	1	0.12%	474	55.76%	850
Winchester	2,128	59.54%	1,439	40.26%	3	0.08%	1	0.03%	3	0.08%	689	19.28%	3,574
Windham	2,571	46.68%	2,921	53.03%	15	0.27%	0	0.00%	1	0.02%	-350	-6.35%	5,508
Windsor	1,873	65.31%	978	34.10%	12	0.42%	5	0.17%	0	0.00%	895	31.21%	2,868
Windsor Locks	395	26.33%	1,098	73.20%	4	0.27%	1	0.07%	2	0.13%	-703	-46.87%	1,500
Wolcott	259	75.95%	78	22.87%	4	1.17%	0	0.00%	0	0.00%	181	53.08%	341
Woodbridge	431	78.51%	117	21.31%	1	0.18%	0	0.00%	0	0.00%	314	57.19%	549
Woodbury	590	84.17%	108	15.41%	1	0.14%	2	0.29%	0	0.00%	482	68.76%	701
Woodstock	618	85.60%	102	14.13%	1	0.14%	1	0.14%	0	0.00%	516	71.47%	722
Totals	296,641	53.63%	252,085	45.58%	3,030	0.55%	737	0.13%	616	0.11%	44,556	8.06%	553,109

== See also ==
- United States presidential elections in Connecticut
