= Mendell =

Mendell is a surname. Notable people with the surname include:

- David Mendell, American journalist
- Estelle Mendell Amory, American educator and author
- Gary Mendell, American businessman
- Harry Mendell, American inventor
- Joshua T. Mendell, American researcher
- Lorne Mendell, American neurobiologist

== See also ==
- Mendel (name)
