= Aspetuck, Connecticut =

Aspetuck is a village on the Aspetuck River, in Fairfield County, Connecticut, United States. It is mostly situated in the town of Easton but extending also into Weston.

It contains the Aspectuck Historic District, a well-preserved collection of houses from the 18th and 19th centuries. The area was settled in the 17th century. It was a long-time home of Helen Keller. According to a New York Times real estate section article, "The district gets its name from the Aspetuck Indians, who lived along the river. In 1670, they sold the land to English settlers for cloth, winter wheat and maize valued at $.36." Weston was incorporated in 1787, and Easton was split out and incorporated in 1845.

== Aspetuck Historic District ==
- Aspetuck Historic District
- U.S. National Register of Historic Places
- U.S. Historic district
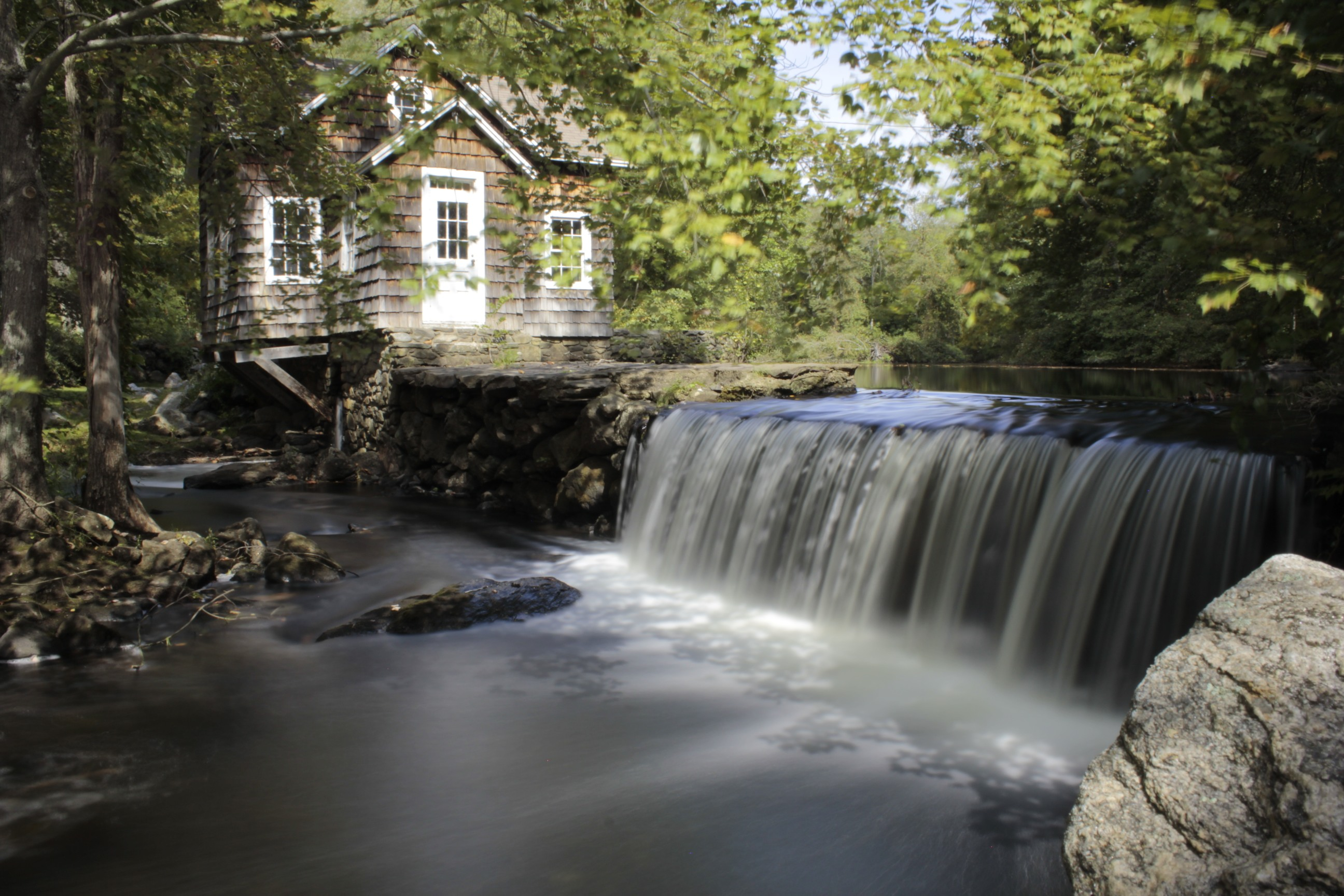
- Dam at the grist mill

- Location within Connecticut Location within the United States
- Location: Roughly, Redding Road from Junction with Old Redding Road to Welles Hill Road and Old Redding Road North past Aspetuck River, Towns of Easton and Weston, Connecticut
- Coordinates: 41°13′24″N 73°19′24″W
- Architectural style: Colonial Revival, Greek Revival, Colonial
- NRHP reference No.: 91000437
- Added to NRHP: August 23, 1991

The Aspetuck Historic District is a historic district that preserves part of the historic village. It was listed on the National Register of Historic Places in 1991. It occupies about 80 acres (32 ha) on the banks of the Aspetuck River and includes the oldest section of Easton. The 22 houses in the historic district date from 1750 to 1850. Some structures in the district are examples of Colonial Revival architecture. The district is considered significant for being a "Connecticut farming community that hasn't seen much change" and the home of Helen Keller in her later years. Helen Keller, who was blind and deaf, often walked through the neighborhood by herself, using as her guide a fence that extended down to the Aspetuck River.

The historic district is defined to "exclude excessive back acreage" and also "the district stops short of the historical extent of the community in order to exclude an area where the majority of buildings would be noncontributing due to alterations or recent origin."

The district "is significant because it embodies the distinctive architectural and cultural-landscape characteristics of a farming community from the late colonial and early national periods.... The widely spaced distribution of houses, most accompanied by a barn and all with ample yards that once served as pasture, field or garden recalls the appearance of an inland Connecticut farming community when agriculture was the basis of the local economy. The predominant type of building in the district—the traditional center-chimney, gable-roofed dwelling—is also characteristic of Connecticut farming communities of the late 18th and early 19th centuries...."

The district is significant because a house on Redding "was the long-time home of Helen Keller, who lost her hearing and sight at an early age, and whose long struggle to overcome these handicaps has provided inspiration to millions...."

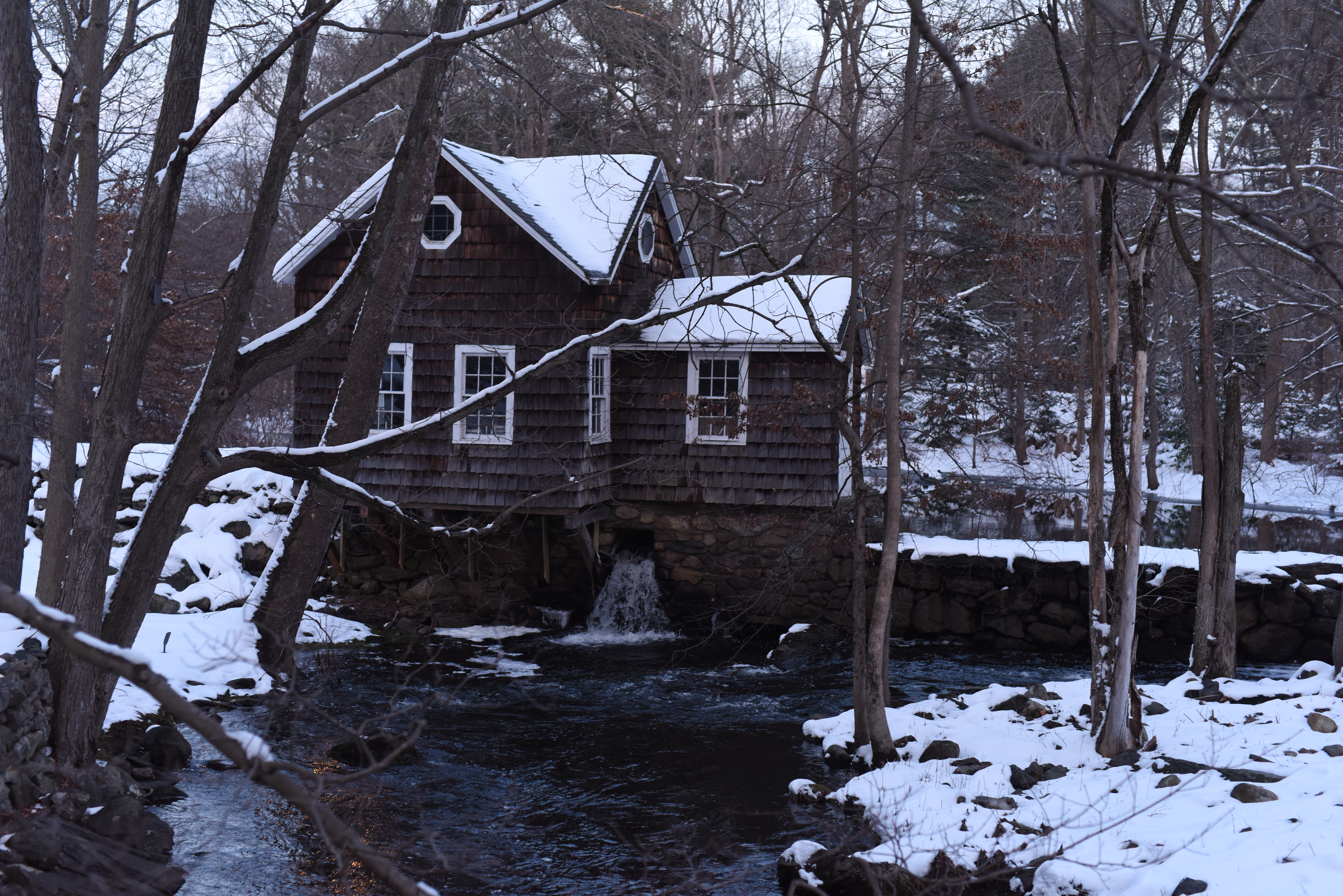
The historic Grist Mill in Aspetuck, CT, winter 2016.

Significant structures in the district include:

- Orando Perry House, 1840, which "displays the impact of Greek Revival architecture house with in its small porch with Doric columns and flush-boarded pediment"
- Bradley House, 7 Old Redding Road
- Helen Keller House, 1946, 163 Redding Road, "a true Colonial Revival dwelling, built in the 20th century after late 18th-century precedents, rather than the 20th-century modification of an earlier house" It has a denticular cornice and a "pedimented entry shelter on Tuscan columns", among other details.
- Peter Williams House, 1810, 65 Redding Road
- David Bradley House, 1790, 135 Redding Road
- a bridge (Connecticut Dept. of Transportation Bridge #4933), a reinforced concrete arch bridge with cobblestone-faced spandrels and parapets, from 1941
- a dam, a rubble-stone dam from mid-19th century at the site of the Orando Perry grist mill

== See also ==
- National Register of Historic Places listings in Fairfield County, Connecticut
