= Plattsville, Connecticut =

Census-designated place in Connecticut, United States

- Census-designated place
- Location within Connecticut Location within the United States
- Coordinates: 41°13′29″N 73°15′24″W
- Country: United States
- State: Connecticut
- County: Fairfield
- Towns: Easton, Fairfield

Area
  - Total: 1.00 sq mi (2.58 km^{2})
  - Land: 1.00 sq mi (2.58 km^{2})
  - Water: 0 sq mi (0.0 km^{2})
- Elevation: 200 ft (61 m)
- Time zone: UTC-5 (Eastern (EST))
  - Summer (DST): UTC-4 (EDT)
- ZIP Codes: 06612 (Easton); 06825 (Fairfield)
- Area codes: 203/475
- FIPS code: 09-60365
- GNIS feature ID: 2805959

Plattsville is a census-designated place (CDP) in the towns of Easton and Fairfield, Fairfield County, Connecticut, United States. It is primarily in the town of Easton, with a portion extending south across the Mill River into Fairfield. Route 15 the Merritt Parkway forms the Southeast border of the CDP, and Route 59 (Sport Hill Road in Easton and Easton Turnpike in Fairfield) runs north–south through it.

As of the 2020 census, Plattsville had a population of 1,131.

Plattsville was first listed as a CDP prior to the 2020 census.

== Demographics ==
=== 2020 census ===
As of the 2020 census, Plattsville had a population of 1,131. The median age was 45.8 years. 24.9% of residents were under the age of 18 and 20.5% of residents were 65 years of age or older. For every 100 females there were 85.7 males, and for every 100 females age 18 and over there were 87.0 males age 18 and over.

100.0% of residents lived in urban areas, while 0.0% lived in rural areas.

There were 410 households in Plattsville, of which 38.3% had children under the age of 18 living in them. Of all households, 71.0% were married-couple households, 9.8% were households with a male householder and no spouse or partner present, and 16.6% were households with a female householder and no spouse or partner present. About 13.9% of all households were made up of individuals and 10.7% had someone living alone who was 65 years of age or older.

There were 425 housing units, of which 3.5% were vacant. The homeowner vacancy rate was 1.0% and the rental vacancy rate was 0.0%.

Racial composition as of the 2020 census
Race	Number	Percent
White	955	84.4%
Black or African American	16	1.4%
American Indian and Alaska Native	1	0.1%
Asian	65	5.7%
Native Hawaiian and Other Pacific Islander	1	0.1%
Some other race	9	0.8%
Two or more races	84	7.4%
Hispanic or Latino (of any race)	68	6.0%
