= 1924 United States presidential election in Connecticut =

- November 4, 1924

Nominee	Calvin Coolidge	John W. Davis	Robert M. La Follette
Party	Republican	Democratic	Progressive
Home state	Massachusetts	West Virginia	Wisconsin
Running mate	Charles G. Dawes	Charles W. Bryan	Burton K. Wheeler
Electoral vote	7	0	0
Popular vote	246,322	110,184	42,416
Percentage	61.54%	27.53%	10.60%

Coolidge
40–50%
50–60%
60–70%
70–80%
80–90%
90–100%
Davis
50–60%
President before election
Calvin Coolidge
Republican
Elected President
Calvin Coolidge
Republican

The 1924 United States presidential election in Connecticut took place on November 4, 1924, as part of the 1924 United States presidential election which was held throughout all contemporary 48 states. Voters chose seven representatives, or electors to the Electoral College, who voted for president and vice president.

Connecticut voted for the Republican nominee, incumbent President Calvin Coolidge of Massachusetts, over the Democratic nominee, Ambassador John W. Davis of West Virginia. Coolidge ran with former Budget Director Charles G. Dawes of Illinois, while Davis ran with Governor Charles W. Bryan of Nebraska. Also in the running that year was the Progressive Party nominee, Senator Robert M. La Follette of Wisconsin and his running mate Senator Burton K. Wheeler of Montana. La Follette's support base was primarily among rural German and Scandinavian Americans, and he possessed little appeal in the Northeast outside a few New York and Boston anti-Prohibition precincts.

Coolidge won the state of Connecticut by a margin of 34.01%. His victory was also enjoyed a personal popularity which helped him in the state and the rest of New England. He was the style of a traditional New England Yankee, having been born in the small-town of Plymouth Notch, Vermont, and establishing his political career nearby as Governor of Massachusetts. Thus Coolidge remained popular with voters across the New England region.

The 1920s were a fiercely Republican decade in American politics, and Connecticut in that era was a fiercely Republican state in presidential elections. The economic boom and social good feelings of the Roaring Twenties under popular Republican leadership virtually guaranteed Calvin Coolidge an easy win in the state against the conservative Southern Democrat John Davis, who had little appeal in Northern states like Connecticut.

As of 2025, this was the last presidential election in which the Republican nominee carried the city of Hartford. This is the most recent election, as of 2025, where Connecticut voted to the right of New Hampshire. This was also the Republican Party's strongest margin in the state as of 2025.

== Results ==
1924 United States presidential election in Connecticut
Party	Candidate	Running mate	Popular vote		Electoral vote	
Party	Candidate	Running mate	Count	%	Count	%
Republican	Calvin Coolidge of Massachusetts	Charles Gates Dawes of Illinois	246,322	61.54%	7	100.00%
Democratic	John William Davis of West Virginia	Charles Wayland Bryan of Nebraska	110,184	27.53%	0	0.00%
Progressive	Robert Marion La Follette of Wisconsin	Burton Kendall Wheeler of Montana	42,416	10.60%	0	0.00%
Socialist Labor	Frank Tetes Johns of Oregon	Verne L. Reynolds of New York	1,373	0.34%	0	0.00%
Total			400,295	100.00%	7	100.00%

=== By county ===
1924 United States presidential election in Connecticut (by county)
County	Coolidge %	Coolidge #	Davis %	Davis #	Others %	Others #	Total #
Fairfield	66.2%	58,041	21.5%	18,815	12.3%	10,788	87,644
Hartford	61.9%	61,381	28.4%	28,139	9.7%	9,591	99,111
Litchfield	61.3%	15,499	26.3%	6,645	12.3%	3,120	25,264
Middlesex	65.2%	9,383	27.9%	4,009	6.9%	994	14,386
New Haven	57.4%	69,164	30.1%	36,247	12.5%	15,085	140,496
New London	62.3%	18,205	29.5%	8,615	8.2%	2,381	29,201
Tolland	62.3%	5,161	27.0%	2,239	10.7%	885	8,285
Windham	59.6%	9,488	34.4%	5,475	5.9%	945	15,908

=== Results by town ===
Town	John Calvin Coolidge Republican		John William Davis Democratic		Robert Marion La Follette Sr. Progressive		Frank Tetes Johns Socialist Labor		Margin		Total votes cast
Town	#	%	#	%	#	%	#	%	#	%	Total votes cast
Andover	116	59.79%	75	38.66%	3	1.55%	0	0.00%	41	21.13%	194
Ansonia	3,149	54.58%	2,033	35.23%	586	10.16%	2	0.03%	1,116	19.34%	5,770
Ashford	102	47.22%	86	39.81%	28	12.96%	0	0.00%	16	7.41%	216
Avon	293	66.14%	117	26.41%	31	7.00%	2	0.45%	176	39.73%	443
Barkhamsted	171	75.66%	53	23.45%	2	0.88%	0	0.00%	118	52.21%	226
Beacon Falls	284	64.55%	115	26.14%	40	9.09%	1	0.23%	169	38.41%	440
Berlin	849	73.06%	245	21.08%	67	5.77%	1	0.09%	604	51.98%	1,162
Bethany	89	69.53%	35	27.34%	4	3.13%	0	0.00%	54	42.19%	128
Bethel	934	76.00%	135	10.98%	160	13.02%	0	0.00%	774 (Note: In this town where La Follette ran second ahead of Davis, the margin given is that between Coolidge and La Follette.)	62.98%	1,229
Bethlehem	155	73.81%	54	25.71%	1	0.48%	0	0.00%	101	48.10%	210
Bloomfield	451	63.17%	219	30.67%	41	5.74%	3	0.42%	232	32.49%	714
Bolton	105	62.13%	54	31.95%	10	5.92%	0	0.00%	51	30.18%	169
Bozrah	176	50.43%	162	46.42%	10	2.87%	1	0.29%	14	4.01%	349
Branford	1,502	66.87%	538	23.95%	186	8.28%	20	0.89%	964	42.92%	2,246
Bridgeport	20,071	62.50%	6,215	19.35%	5,607	17.46%	219	0.68%	13,856	43.15%	32,112
Bridgewater	120	55.56%	94	43.52%	2	0.93%	0	0.00%	26	12.04%	216
Bristol	3,945	68.04%	1,330	22.94%	491	8.47%	32	0.55%	2,615	45.10%	5,798
Brookfield	296	79.36%	57	15.28%	20	5.36%	0	0.00%	239	64.08%	373
Brooklyn	327	55.71%	245	41.74%	15	2.56%	0	0.00%	82	13.97%	587
Burlington	178	66.67%	71	26.59%	18	6.74%	0	0.00%	107	40.07%	267
Canaan	145	78.38%	36	19.46%	4	2.16%	0	0.00%	109	58.92%	185
Canterbury	201	69.55%	76	26.30%	12	4.15%	0	0.00%	125	43.25%	289
Canton	664	74.86%	195	21.98%	28	3.16%	0	0.00%	469	52.87%	887
Chaplin	110	80.29%	20	14.60%	7	5.11%	0	0.00%	90	65.69%	137
Cheshire	697	78.76%	144	16.27%	43	4.86%	1	0.11%	553	62.49%	885
Chester	344	72.27%	105	22.06%	27	5.67%	0	0.00%	239	50.21%	476
Clinton	375	83.15%	50	11.09%	26	5.76%	0	0.00%	325	72.06%	451
Colchester	270	55.44%	167	34.29%	49	10.06%	1	0.21%	103	21.15%	487
Colebrook	136	76.84%	36	20.34%	5	2.82%	0	0.00%	100	56.50%	177
Columbia	136	63.55%	72	33.64%	6	2.80%	0	0.00%	64	29.91%	214
Cornwall	253	68.56%	110	29.81%	6	1.63%	0	0.00%	143	38.75%	369
Coventry	383	58.12%	259	39.30%	17	2.58%	0	0.00%	124	18.82%	659
Cromwell	607	81.48%	104	13.96%	34	4.56%	0	0.00%	503	67.52%	745
Danbury	4,760	62.22%	1,448	18.93%	1,430	18.69%	12	0.16%	3,312	43.29%	7,650
Darien	1,134	79.13%	218	15.21%	79	5.51%	2	0.14%	916	63.92%	1,433
Derby	1,190	38.71%	1,541	50.13%	339	11.03%	4	0.13%	-351	-11.42%	3,074
Durham	286	73.52%	93	23.91%	10	2.57%	0	0.00%	193	49.61%	389
East Granby	193	76.89%	53	21.12%	5	1.99%	0	0.00%	140	55.78%	251
East Haddam	419	68.46%	185	30.23%	8	1.31%	0	0.00%	234	38.24%	612
East Hampton	658	59.49%	398	35.99%	48	4.34%	2	0.18%	260	23.51%	1,106
East Hartford	1,963	49.48%	916	23.09%	1,068	26.92%	20	0.50%	895	22.56%	3,967
East Haven	1,064	70.56%	304	20.16%	138	9.15%	2	0.13%	760	50.40%	1,508
East Lyme	521	68.82%	206	27.21%	23	3.04%	7	0.92%	315	41.61%	757
East Windsor	592	67.12%	209	23.70%	81	9.18%	0	0.00%	383	43.42%	882
Eastford	132	77.65%	35	20.59%	3	1.76%	0	0.00%	97	57.06%	170
Easton	202	67.11%	88	29.24%	11	3.65%	0	0.00%	114	37.87%	301
Ellington	414	66.24%	132	21.12%	75	12.00%	4	0.64%	282	45.12%	625
Enfield	1,865	55.64%	1,334	39.80%	152	4.53%	1	0.03%	531	15.84%	3,352
Essex	759	80.57%	157	16.67%	25	2.65%	1	0.11%	602	63.91%	942
Fairfield	2,020	73.19%	362	13.12%	373	13.51%	5	0.18%	1,647	59.67%	2,760
Farmington	900	59.45%	560	36.99%	53	3.50%	1	0.07%	340	22.46%	1,514
Franklin	129	93.48%	6	4.35%	3	2.17%	0	0.00%	123	89.13%	138
Glastonbury	1,045	61.87%	607	35.94%	37	2.19%	0	0.00%	438	25.93%	1,689
Goshen	141	78.77%	37	20.67%	1	0.56%	0	0.00%	104	58.10%	179
Granby	358	84.63%	64	15.13%	1	0.24%	0	0.00%	294	69.50%	423
Greenwich	4,242	74.53%	1,112	19.54%	335	5.89%	3	0.05%	3,130	54.99%	5,692
Griswold	527	48.53%	464	42.73%	94	8.66%	1	0.09%	63	5.80%	1,086
Groton	1,697	75.59%	431	19.20%	117	5.21%	0	0.00%	1,266	56.39%	2,245
Guilford	772	70.31%	226	20.58%	99	9.02%	1	0.09%	546	49.73%	1,098
Haddam	459	67.30%	211	30.94%	12	1.76%	0	0.00%	248	36.36%	682
Hamden	2,374	76.04%	480	15.37%	254	8.14%	14	0.45%	1,894	60.67%	3,122
Hampton	159	75.00%	50	23.58%	3	1.42%	0	0.00%	109	51.42%	212
Hartford	22,530	55.23%	13,897	34.07%	4,146	10.16%	222	0.54%	8,633	21.16%	40,795
Hartland	98	79.67%	22	17.89%	3	2.44%	0	0.00%	76	61.79%	123
Harwinton	161	71.24%	44	19.47%	21	9.29%	0	0.00%	117	51.77%	226
Hebron	161	65.18%	68	27.53%	18	7.29%	0	0.00%	93	37.65%	247
Kent	222	58.42%	148	38.95%	10	2.63%	0	0.00%	74	19.47%	380
Killingly	1,393	63.69%	690	31.55%	102	4.66%	2	0.09%	703	32.14%	2,187
Killingworth	102	51.52%	38	19.19%	58	29.29%	0	0.00%	44	22.22%	198
Lebanon	328	88.17%	27	7.26%	17	4.57%	0	0.00%	301	80.91%	372
Ledyard	222	79.00%	53	18.86%	6	2.14%	0	0.00%	169	60.14%	281
Lisbon	161	62.65%	66	25.68%	30	11.67%	0	0.00%	95	36.96%	257
Litchfield	750	62.76%	382	31.97%	63	5.27%	0	0.00%	368	30.79%	1,195
Lyme	177	83.10%	31	14.55%	5	2.35%	0	0.00%	146	68.54%	213
Madison	721	85.83%	43	5.12%	76	9.05%	0	0.00%	645	76.79%	840
Manchester	3,924	75.56%	968	18.64%	292	5.62%	9	0.17%	2,956	56.92%	5,193
Mansfield	510	74.34%	148	21.57%	28	4.08%	0	0.00%	362	52.77%	686
Marlborough	62	46.27%	68	50.75%	4	2.99%	0	0.00%	-6	-4.48%	134
Meriden	8,230	62.93%	3,483	26.63%	1,311	10.02%	55	0.42%	4,747	36.29%	13,079
Middlebury	251	82.84%	43	14.19%	9	2.97%	0	0.00%	208	68.65%	303
Middlefield	207	84.84%	30	12.30%	7	2.87%	0	0.00%	177	72.54%	244
Middletown	3,269	58.11%	1,793	31.87%	554	9.85%	10	0.18%	1,476	26.24%	5,626
Milford	2,649	75.95%	595	17.06%	232	6.65%	12	0.34%	2,054	58.89%	3,488
Monroe	304	76.96%	71	17.97%	19	4.81%	1	0.25%	233	58.99%	395
Montville	543	69.97%	200	25.77%	32	4.12%	1	0.13%	343	44.20%	776
Morris	119	57.21%	82	39.42%	7	3.37%	0	0.00%	37	17.79%	208
Naugatuck	2,132	49.17%	1,536	35.42%	636	14.67%	32	0.74%	596	13.75%	4,336
New Britain	9,098	64.04%	3,224	22.69%	1,800	12.67%	85	0.60%	5,874	41.35%	14,207
New Canaan	1,066	75.07%	293	20.63%	61	4.30%	0	0.00%	773	54.44%	1,420
New Fairfield	156	81.68%	29	15.18%	6	3.14%	0	0.00%	127	66.49%	191
New Hartford	408	61.45%	226	34.04%	30	4.52%	0	0.00%	182	27.41%	664
New Haven	22,366	54.43%	12,083	29.41%	6,420	15.63%	219	0.53%	10,283	25.03%	41,088
New London	3,915	61.28%	1,725	27.00%	742	11.61%	7	0.11%	2,190	34.28%	6,389
New Milford	1,163	65.23%	535	30.01%	85	4.77%	0	0.00%	628	35.22%	1,783
Newington	594	78.99%	102	13.56%	53	7.05%	3	0.40%	492	65.43%	752
Newtown	599	52.27%	461	40.23%	86	7.50%	0	0.00%	138	12.04%	1,146
Norfolk	396	58.15%	271	39.79%	14	2.06%	0	0.00%	125	18.36%	681
North Branford	211	76.17%	52	18.77%	14	5.05%	0	0.00%	159	57.40%	277
North Canaan	525	68.90%	215	28.22%	22	2.89%	0	0.00%	310	40.68%	762
North Haven	644	86.68%	46	6.19%	53	7.13%	0	0.00%	591	79.54%	743
North Stonington	256	77.81%	67	20.36%	6	1.82%	0	0.00%	189	57.45%	329
Norwalk	5,605	68.13%	2,019	24.54%	545	6.62%	58	0.70%	3,586	43.59%	8,227
Norwich	5,003	56.67%	3,051	34.56%	749	8.48%	25	0.28%	1,952	22.11%	8,828
Old Lyme	297	64.99%	149	32.60%	11	2.41%	0	0.00%	148	32.39%	457
Old Saybrook	289	72.07%	91	22.69%	21	5.24%	0	0.00%	198	49.38%	401
Orange	370	89.59%	23	5.57%	20	4.84%	0	0.00%	347	84.02%	413
Oxford	210	68.63%	84	27.45%	12	3.92%	0	0.00%	126	41.18%	306
Plainfield	1,063	50.96%	774	37.10%	249	11.94%	0	0.00%	289	13.85%	2,086
Plainville	977	75.44%	238	18.38%	77	5.95%	3	0.23%	739	57.07%	1,295
Plymouth	804	64.11%	281	22.41%	166	13.24%	3	0.24%	523	41.71%	1,254
Pomfret	380	68.35%	171	30.76%	0	0.00%	5	0.90%	209	37.59%	556
Portland	854	56.67%	563	37.36%	89	5.91%	1	0.07%	291	19.31%	1,507
Preston	282	77.26%	80	21.92%	3	0.82%	0	0.00%	202	55.34%	365
Prospect	124	80.00%	19	12.26%	12	7.74%	0	0.00%	105	67.74%	155
Putnam	1,421	62.00%	686	29.93%	181	7.90%	4	0.17%	735	32.07%	2,292
Redding	427	66.93%	181	28.37%	29	4.55%	1	0.17%	246	38.56%	638
Ridgefield	762	78.64%	181	18.68%	25	2.58%	1	0.10%	581	59.96%	969
Rocky Hill	390	74.00%	116	22.01%	20	3.80%	1	0.19%	274	51.99%	527
Roxbury	146	60.83%	83	34.58%	10	4.17%	1	0.42%	63	26.25%	240
Salem	92	82.14%	11	9.82%	9	8.04%	0	0.00%	81	72.32%	112
Salisbury	695	71.87%	255	26.37%	17	1.76%	0	0.00%	440	45.50%	967
Saybrook	523	72.34%	165	22.82%	34	4.70%	1	0.14%	358	49.52%	723
Scotland	124	83.78%	16	10.81%	8	5.41%	0	0.00%	108	72.97%	148
Seymour	1,312	73.46%	367	20.55%	106	5.94%	1	0.06%	945	52.91%	1,786
Sharon	393	79.72%	95	19.27%	5	1.01%	0	0.00%	298	60.45%	493
Shelton	1,921	65.25%	622	21.13%	393	13.35%	8	0.27%	1,299	44.12%	2,944
Sherman	129	79.63%	30	18.52%	3	1.85%	0	0.00%	99	61.11%	162
Simsbury	597	68.15%	266	30.37%	13	1.48%	0	0.00%	331	37.79%	876
Somers	324	67.08%	140	28.99%	18	3.73%	1	0.21%	184	38.10%	483
South Windsor	347	67.38%	140	27.18%	27	5.24%	1	0.19%	207	40.19%	515
Southbury	310	69.66%	122	27.42%	13	2.92%	0	0.00%	188	42.25%	445
Southington	1,625	67.09%	593	24.48%	203	8.38%	1	0.04%	1,032	42.61%	2,422
Sprague	365	48.99%	312	41.88%	68	9.13%	0	0.00%	53	7.11%	745
Stafford	899	60.58%	471	31.74%	106	7.14%	8	0.54%	428	28.84%	1,484
Stamford	7,966	62.22%	4,192	32.74%	619	4.83%	26	0.20%	3,774	29.48%	12,803
Sterling	293	63.15%	161	34.70%	10	2.16%	0	0.00%	132	28.45%	464
Stonington	2,342	62.91%	1,100	29.55%	275	7.39%	6	0.16%	1,242	33.36%	3,723
Stratford	2,835	79.19%	315	8.80%	423	11.82%	7	0.20%	2,412	67.37%	3,580
Suffield	894	76.41%	245	20.94%	31	2.65%	0	0.00%	649	55.47%	1,170
Thomaston	845	67.60%	351	28.08%	54	4.32%	0	0.00%	494	39.52%	1,250
Thompson	643	56.85%	448	39.61%	40	3.54%	0	0.00%	195	17.24%	1,131
Tolland	138	48.94%	127	45.04%	17	6.03%	0	0.00%	11	3.90%	282
Torrington	3,582	46.14%	1,776	22.87%	2,387	30.74%	19	0.24%	1,195	15.39%	7,764
Trumbull	621	77.05%	95	11.79%	87	10.79%	3	0.37%	526	65.26%	806
Union	67	75.28%	21	23.60%	1	1.12%	0	0.00%	46	51.69%	89
Vernon	1,593	56.85%	639	22.81%	553	19.74%	17	0.61%	954	34.05%	2,802
Voluntown	115	56.37%	87	42.65%	2	0.98%	0	0.00%	28	13.73%	204
Wallingford	2,417	60.44%	1,160	29.01%	392	9.80%	30	0.75%	1,257	31.43%	3,999
Warren	93	69.40%	30	22.39%	11	8.21%	0	0.00%	63	47.01%	134
Washington	514	69.46%	203	27.43%	23	3.11%	0	0.00%	311	42.03%	740
Waterbury	11,458	48.80%	9,930	42.29%	2,028	8.64%	64	0.27%	1,528	6.51%	23,480
Waterford	787	72.33%	220	20.22%	80	7.35%	1	0.09%	567	52.11%	1,088
Watertown	1,160	75.28%	319	20.70%	62	4.02%	0	0.00%	841	54.57%	1,541
West Hartford	4,077	77.27%	965	18.29%	227	4.30%	7	0.13%	3,112	58.98%	5,276
West Haven	4,145	60.21%	1,158	16.82%	1,546	22.46%	35	0.51%	2,599	37.75%	6,884
Westbrook	232	81.69%	26	9.15%	20	7.04%	6	2.11%	206	72.54%	284
Weston	176	59.86%	97	32.99%	21	7.14%	0	0.00%	79	26.87%	294
Westport	1,316	71.41%	451	24.47%	74	4.02%	2	0.11%	865	46.93%	1,843
Wethersfield	1,238	75.90%	327	20.05%	66	4.05%	0	0.00%	911	55.86%	1,631
Willington	315	89.74%	33	9.40%	2	0.57%	1	0.28%	282	80.34%	351
Wilton	499	73.82%	143	21.15%	34	5.03%	0	0.00%	356	52.66%	676
Winchester	1,946	68.62%	813	28.67%	75	2.64%	2	0.07%	1,133	39.95%	2,836
Windham	2,636	54.29%	1,948	40.12%	270	5.56%	1	0.02%	688	14.17%	4,855
Windsor	1,172	68.50%	467	27.29%	72	4.21%	0	0.00%	705	41.20%	1,711
Windsor Locks	462	40.70%	581	51.19%	92	8.11%	0	0.00%	-119	-10.48%	1,135
Wolcott	195	75.58%	52	20.16%	11	4.26%	0	0.00%	143	55.43%	258
Woodbridge	298	86.38%	35	10.14%	11	3.19%	1	0.29%	263	76.23%	345
Woodbury	456	78.08%	116	19.86%	12	2.05%	0	0.00%	340	58.22%	584
Woodstock	504	87.20%	69	11.94%	5	0.87%	0	0.00%	435	75.26%	578
Totals	246,322	61.54%	110,184	27.53%	42,416	10.60%	1,373	0.34%	134,783	33.67%	400,295

== See also ==
- United States presidential elections in Connecticut
