= Radka–Bradley House =

Historic house in Michigan, United States

- U.S. National Register of Historic Places
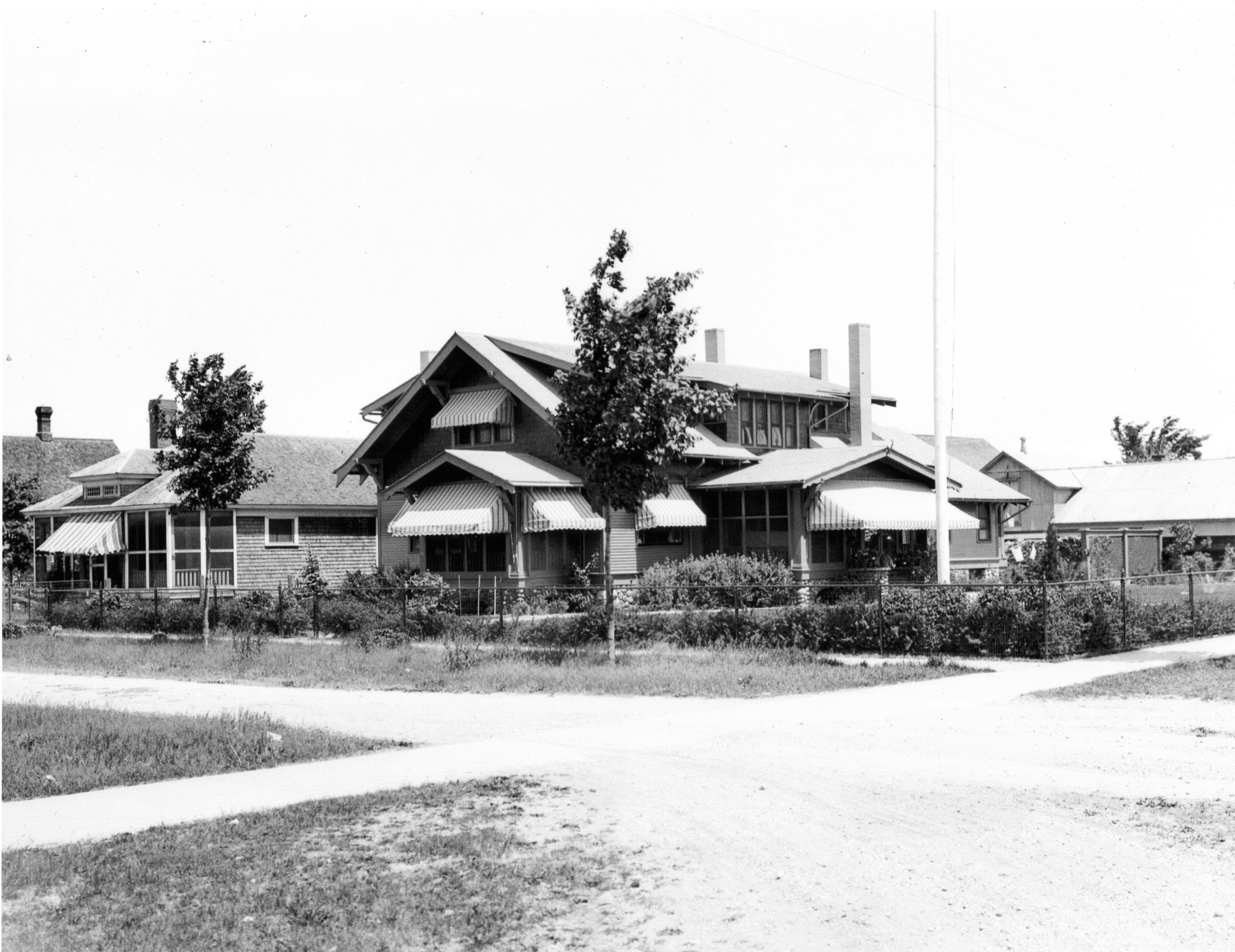
- Radka–Bradley House in 1921

- Location within Michigan Location within the United States
- Interactive map
- Location: 176 W. Michigan Ave., Rogers City, Michigan
- Coordinates: 45°25′13″N 83°49′5″W
- Area: 0.5 acres (0.20 ha)
- Built by: George J. Radka
- Architectural style: Bungalow/American Craftsman
- NRHP reference No.: 91001019
- Added to NRHP: August 5, 1991

The Radka–Bradley House also known as the Bradley House, was built as a private house at 176 West Michigan Avenue in Rogers City, Michigan. It was listed on the National Register of Historic Places in 1991, and is now the Presque Isle County Historical Museum.

== History ==
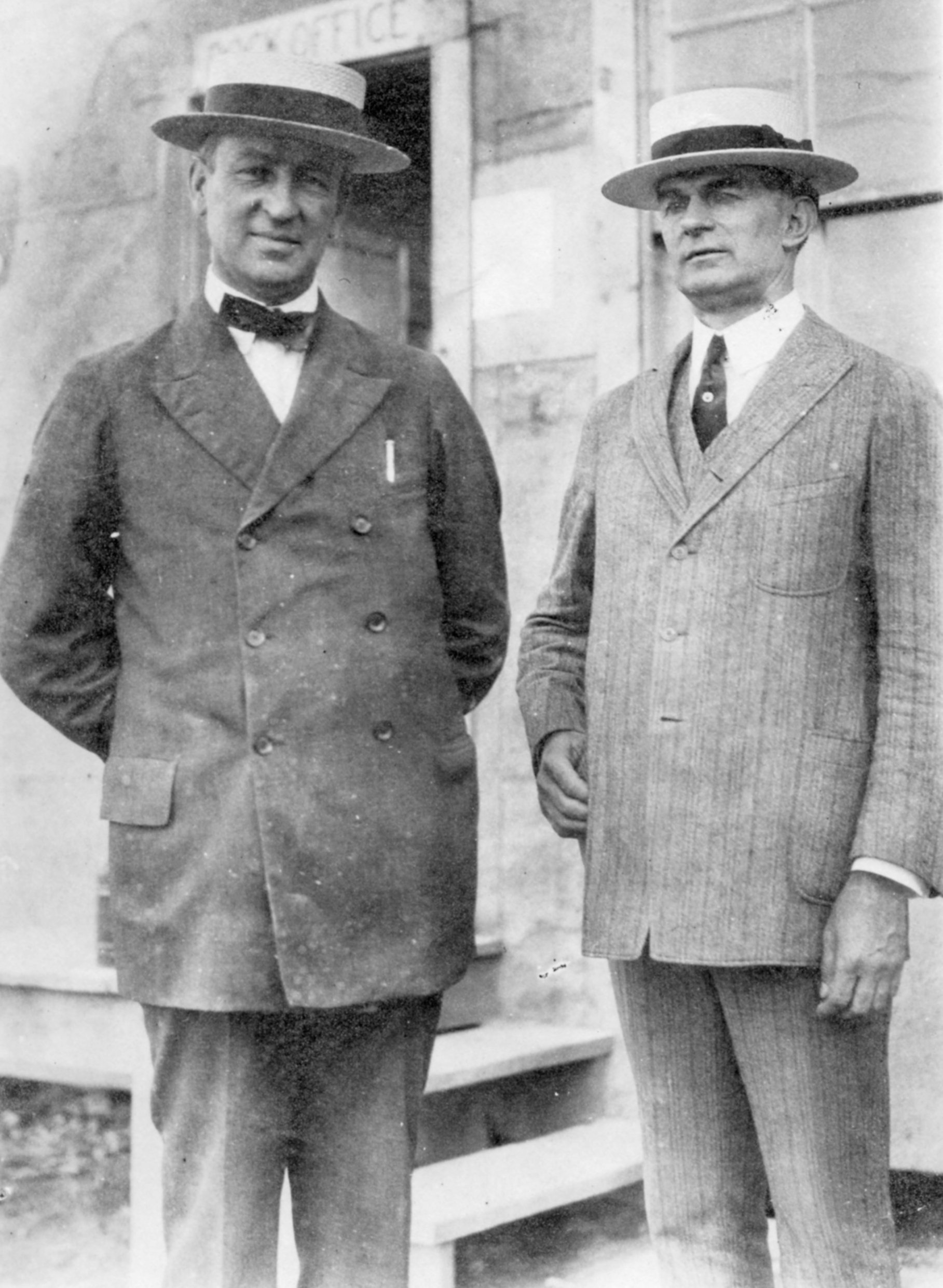
Carl Bradley and W. F. White at Calcite in 1919

This house was constructed in 1914 by George J. Radka, a local contractor and the owner of a planing mill. Radka died unexpectedly at the end of 1914, and in 1915 the house was sold to J. L. Marsters, general superintendent of the Michigan Limestone and Chemical Company. Later that year, Marsters sold the house to his boss, Carl D. Bradley, a shipping magnate and president of Michigan Limestone and Chemical.

Bradley made extensive revisions to the home, enlarging it considerably. While living there, he launched Michigan Limestone and Chemical Company from a small-scale quarry into a national producer of limestone. Bradley was also heavily involved in the business and social life of Rogers City, serving on the boards of the Presque Isle County Savings Bank and of Rogers City Light and Power, helping found the Westminster Presbyterian Church, and serving on the School Board. Bradley lived in the house until 1928, when he died unexpectedly during a vacation to Pasadena, California.

After Bradley's death and in accordance with his contract, Michigan Limestone purchased the house from his widow. Bradley's successor as president, John G. Munson, lived there from 1928 to 1939. When Munson moved along to a higher position in U.S. Steel, Michigan limestone's parent company, the house passed to his successor Irvin L. Clymer, who lived here until 1950. When Clymer was likewise promoted, U.S. Steel's northern district manager Joseph Valentin occupied the house until his retirement in 1957.

After Valentin's retirement, Michigan Limestone allowed the county to use the house as the Presque Isle District Library. The library moved into the building in 1957 and occupied it until 1980. The company then deeded the house to the Presque Isle County Historical Museum, who moved in in 1981. The building is still used as a museum.

== Description ==
The Radka–Bradley House is a 1 1/2-story frame house with a side-gable roof covered with green shingles on a foundation covered with rounded cobblestones. A shed dormer runs across the front, and a single-story glassed in porch covers the entrance. Side porches are located at each end of the house. The roof rafters extend to the exterior of the house, and end in scalloped lower surfaces.

The house has seven bedrooms, four baths, and three sun porches.
