= Bradley-Hubbell House =

Historic house in Connecticut, United States

- U.S. National Register of Historic Places
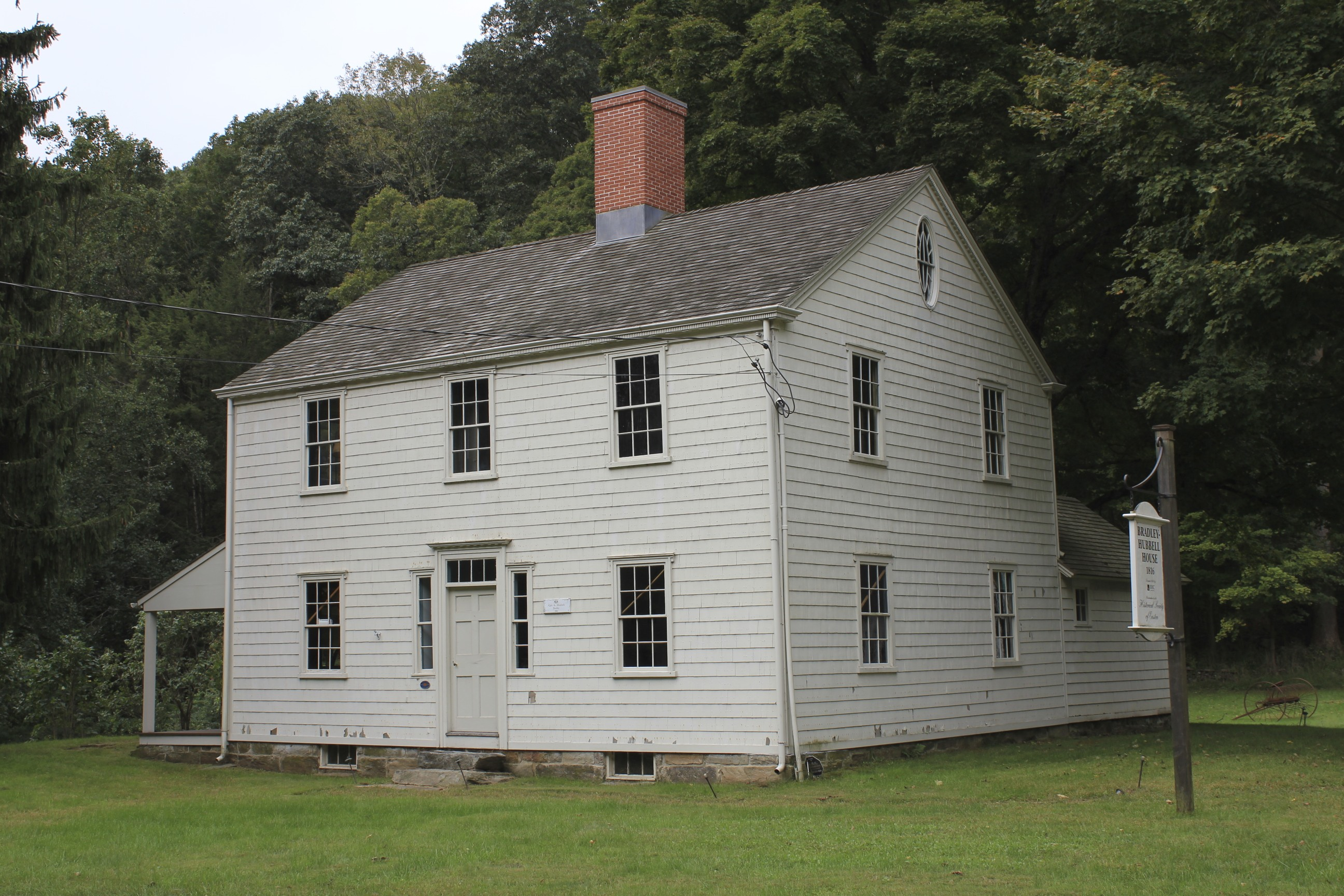

- Location within Connecticut Location within the United States
- Location: 535 Black Rock Turnpike, Easton, Connecticut
- Coordinates: 41°14′41″N 73°19′15″W
- Area: 4 acres (1.6 ha)
- Built: 1816
- Architect: Pinkney Dimon
- Architectural style: Colonial, Federal
- NRHP reference No.: 03000235
- Added to NRHP: April 18, 2003

The Bradley-Hubbell House is an historic house located at 535 Black Rock Turnpike in Easton, Connecticut. Built in 1816 for Aljah and Elizabeth Bradley, it is a Colonial with a traditional center-chimney plan and a few Federal-style ornaments, including oval windows in the gables, a parlor mantel, and rope molding on the stairs. In 1912, Bradley descendants sold the property to the Bridgeport Hydraulic Company, which flooded much of the farmland for a reservoir and leased the house to Franklin Hubbell (d. 1996), one of its employees. In 1998, the house was donated to the Easton Historical Society, which is restoring it.

Two occupants have left memoirs of their life in the house. The first was John Dimon Bradley, son of Aljah and Elizabeth, who described life on what was mainly a subsistence farm in the 19th century. The second was Patricia Hubbell, daughter of Franklin Hubbell, who wrote about her life while she lived in the house between about 1932 and 1954.

On April 18, 2003, it was added to the National Register of Historic Places.

The house overlooks the Aspectuck Reservoir.

The house is located on Black Rock Turnpike, on which the British marched to Danbury, Connecticut during the American Revolutionary War. However, the house had not yet been constructed at that time.

== See also ==
- National Register of Historic Places listings in Fairfield County, Connecticut
