= Bradley House (Midland, Michigan) =

- U.S. National Register of Historic Places
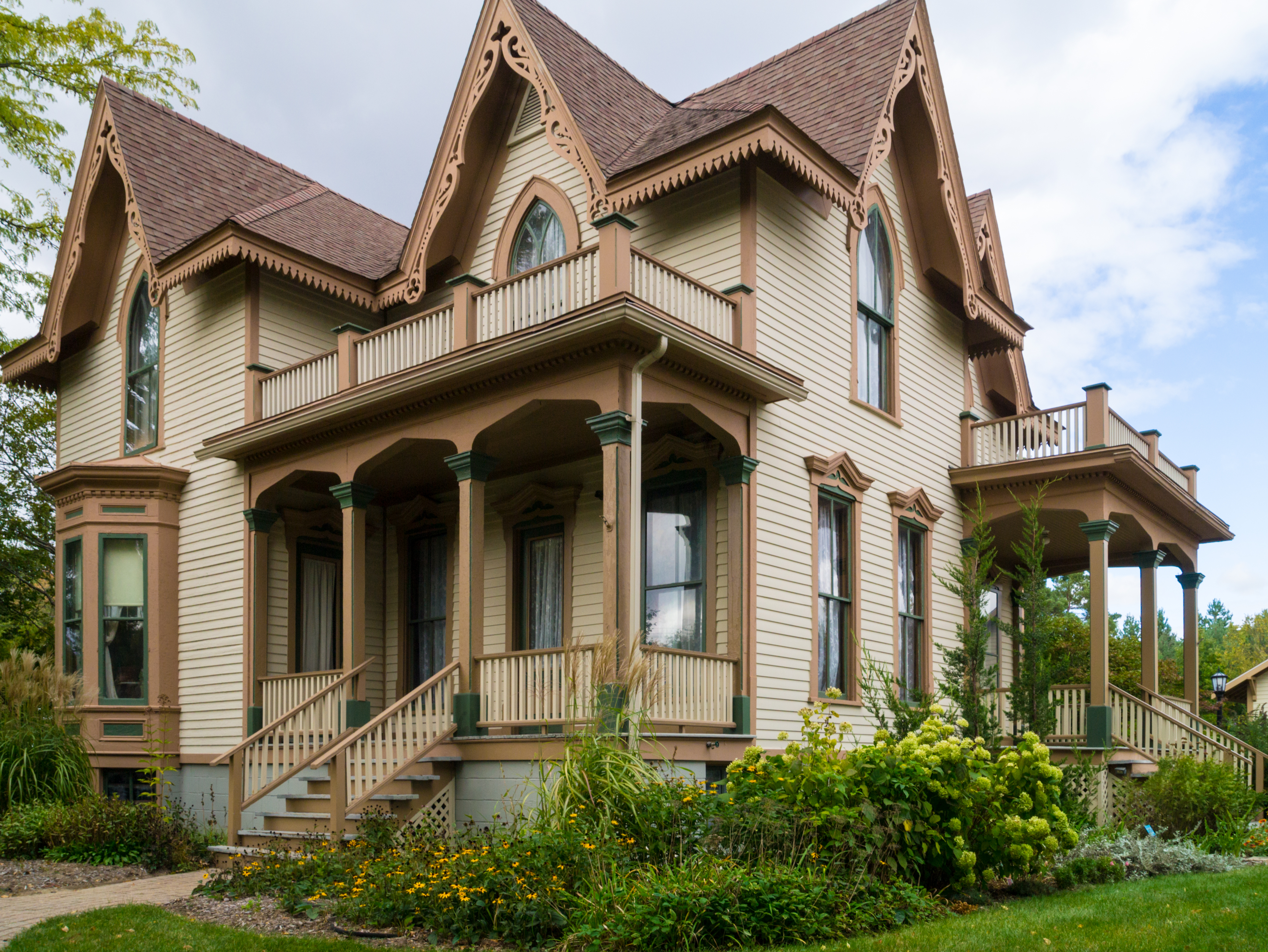
- Interactive map
- Location: 3200 Cook Rd., Midland, Michigan
- Coordinates: 43°37′40″N 84°16′00″W
- Area: less than one acre
- Built: 1874
- NRHP reference No.: 72000642
- Added to NRHP: July 31, 1972

The Bradley House is a restored single-family home, now used as a museum, located at 3200 Cook Road in Midland, Michigan, on the grounds of the Midland County Historical Society Heritage Park (part of the Midland Center for the Arts). The house was listed on the National Register of Historic Places in 1972. The Bradley House was affected by the Edenville and Sanford dam failures in May of 2020. The basement was completely flooded with about one inch of water on the first floor. The building itself is closed until repairs can be made.

== History ==
In 1866, Benjamin F. Bradley moved from New York to Midland and opened a grocery store and separate dry goods store. Both stores were prosperous, establishing Bradley as one of the leading citizens of Midland. He also served as Postmaster of the town, and at various times as alderman, village council president, member of the local Board of Education, and ward supervisor. Bradley was also able to run other businesses, including a publishing company and an insurance company.

In 1874, Bradley built this house near downtown Midland at Number 1 Larkin Street. In 1921, Bradley lost the house in bankruptcy, and it was purchased by the next-door St. Bridgid's Roman Catholic Church. The church used it as a rectory until 1969, when it was slated for demolition. Local preservationists formed the Bradley House Society, which purchased the house and moved it to its present location. The group rehabilitated the house and opened it to the public in 1972. The Bradley House Society merged with the Midland County Historical Society in 1976, and installed a historical park surrounding the house. The house remains open to the public.

== Description ==
The Bradley House is a two-story frame Victorian structure with a steeply pitched gable roof. The main section measures 40 feet by 40 feet; an addition now containing a kitchen and dining room is attached to the rear. A second addition, originally containing a kitchen, was removed when the house was moved to its present location. The house is covered with pine weatherboarding. The roof, originally covered with wood shingles, is now covered with asphalt shingles.

The house contains 14 rooms, seven on the first floor and seven on the second. Floors throughout are oak. A brick fireplace in the front room is covered with green tile and has an oak mantel.
