= 1880 United States presidential election in Connecticut =

- November 2, 1880
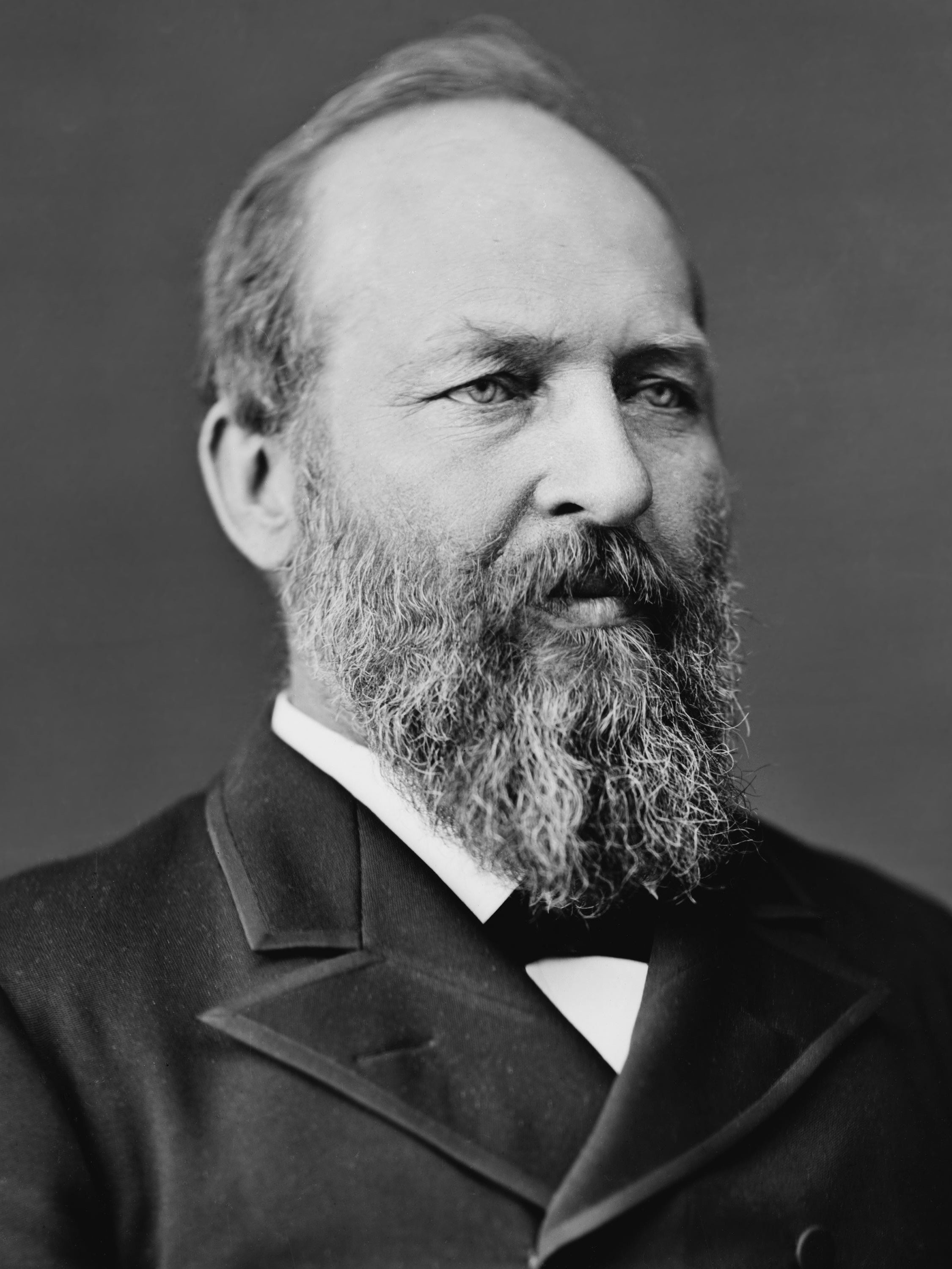

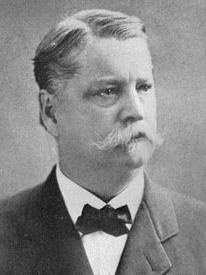
Nominee	James A. Garfield	Winfield Scott Hancock
Party	Republican	Democratic
Home state	Ohio	Pennsylvania
Running mate	Chester A. Arthur	William Hayden English
Electoral vote	6	0
Popular vote	67,071	64,411
Percentage	50.51%	48.50%

Garfield
40–50%
50–60%
60–70%
70–80%
Hancock
40–50%
50–60%
60–70%
70–80%
President before election
Rutherford B. Hayes
Republican
Elected President
James A. Garfield
Republican

The 1880 United States presidential election in Connecticut took place in Connecticut on November 2, 1880, as part of the 1880 United States presidential election. Voters chose six representatives, or electors to the Electoral College, who voted for president and vice president.

Connecticut voted for the Republican nominee, James A. Garfield, over the Democratic nominee, Winfield Scott Hancock by a narrow margin of 2.01%. This would be the last time a Republican would carry the state until William McKinley in 1896.

== Results ==
1880 United States presidential election in Connecticut
Party	Candidate	Running mate	Popular vote		Electoral vote	
Party	Candidate	Running mate	Count	%	Count	%
Republican	James Abram Garfield of Ohio	Chester Alan Arthur of New York	67,071	50.51%	6	100.00%
Democratic	Winfield Scott Hancock of Pennsylvania	William Hayden English of Indiana	64,411	48.50%	0	0.00%
Greenback	James Baird Weaver of Iowa	Barzillai Jefferson Chambers of Texas	868	0.65%	0	0.00%
Prohibition	Neal Dow of Maine	Henry Adams Thompson of Ohio	409	0.31%	0	0.00%
N/A	Others	Others	39	0.03%	0	0.00%
Total			132,798	100.00%	6	100.00%

== See also ==
- United States presidential elections in Connecticut
