= 1896 United States presidential election in Connecticut =

- November 3, 1896

Nominee	William McKinley	William Jennings Bryan
Party	Republican	Democratic
Home state	Ohio	Nebraska
Running mate	Garret Hobart	Arthur Sewall
Electoral vote	6	0
Popular vote	110,285	56,740
Percentage	63.24%	32.54%

McKinley
40–50%
50–60%
60–70%
70–80%
80–90%
Bryan
50–60%
60–70%
President before election
Grover Cleveland
Democratic
Elected President
William McKinley
Republican

The 1896 United States presidential election in Connecticut took place on November 3, 1896, as part of the 1896 United States presidential election. Voters chose six representatives, or electors to the Electoral College, who voted for president and vice president.

Connecticut voted for the Republican nominee, former Governor of Ohio William McKinley, over the Democratic nominee, former U.S. Representative from Nebraska William Jennings Bryan. McKinley won the state by a margin of 30.7%. This was the first time a Republican carried Connecticut in a presidential election since James A. Garfield did so 16 years earlier.

William Bryan, running on a platform of free silver, appealed strongly to Western miners and farmers in the 1896 election, but held little appeal in the Northeastern states like Connecticut.

Bryan would lose Connecticut to McKinley again four years later and would later lose the state again in 1908 to William Howard Taft.

== Results ==
1896 United States presidential election in Connecticut
Party	Candidate	Running mate	Popular vote		Electoral vote	
Party	Candidate	Running mate	Count	%	Count	%
Republican	William McKinley of Ohio	Garret Augustus Hobart of New Jersey	110,285	63.24%	6	100.00%
Democratic	William Jennings Bryan of Nebraska	Arthur Sewall of Maine	56,740	32.54%	0	0.00%
National Democratic	John McAuley Palmer of Illinois	Simon Bolivar Buckner of Kentucky	4,336	2.49%	0	0.00%
Prohibition	Joshua Levering of Maryland	Hale Johnson of Illinois	1,806	1.04%	0	0.00%
Socialist Labor	Charles Horatio Matchett of New York	Matthew Maguire of New Jersey	1,223	0.70%	0	0.00%
Total			174,390	100.00%	6	100.00%

== See also ==
- United States presidential elections in Connecticut
