= J.D.C. Bradley House =

Historic house in Massachusetts, United States

- U.S. National Register of Historic Places
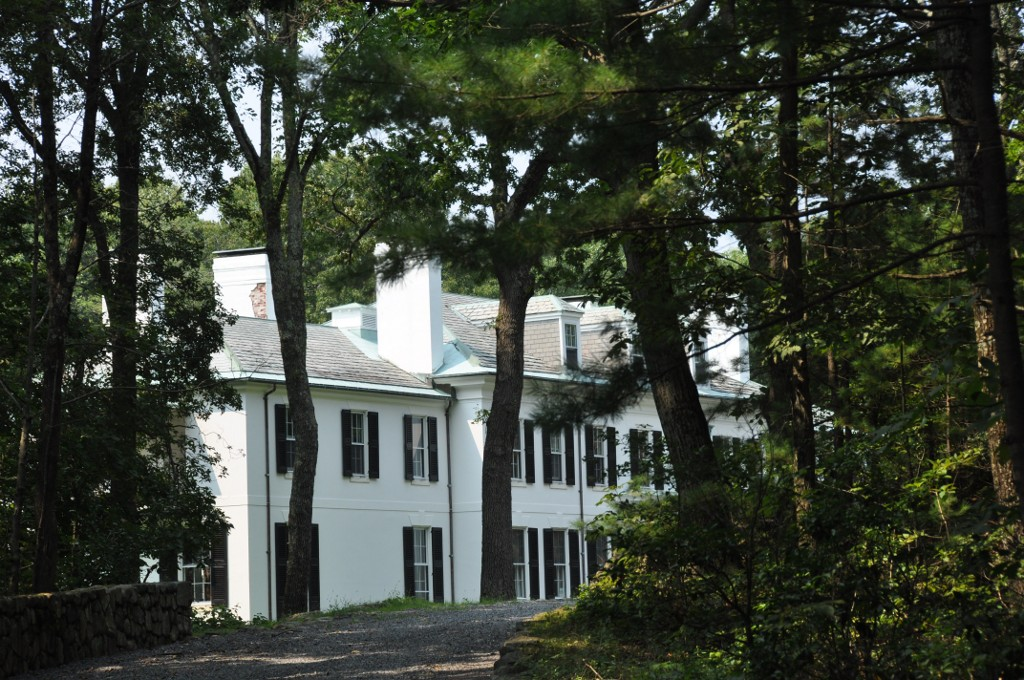

- Location within Massachusetts Location within the United States
- Location: 5 Sadie Hutt Ln., Southborough, Massachusetts
- Coordinates: 42°18′59″N 71°32′34″W
- Area: 5.93 acres (2.40 ha)
- Built: 1913
- Architect: Platt, Charles Adams
- Architectural style: Colonial Revival
- NRHP reference No.: 99000260
- Added to NRHP: February 26, 1999

The J.D.C. Bradley House, also known as Oakcrest, is a historic mansion at 5 Sadie Hutt Lane in Southborough, Massachusetts. Built in 1913, the massive, 15,000-square-foot (1,400 m^{2}) stucco house is one of the finest surviving works of architect Charles Adams Platt in Massachusetts. The house was listed on the National Register of Historic Places in 1999, where it is listed at 60 Sears Road.

== Description and history ==
The J.D.C. Bradley House is located in northern Southborough, at the center of the loop created by Sadie Hutt Lane. It is set at the crest of a rise, which affords views to the west. The house is a 2 1/2-story structure, with a wooden frame and exterior brick walls finished in stucco. It has a large central block 71 feet (22 m) long and seven bays wide, with symmetrical flanking wings three bays wide. Each section is topped by a hipped roof; the central block has three gable dormers projecting from the front facade. The interior retains most of its original finishes, and includes a library room 32 by 27 feet (9.8 m × 8.2 m) in size, sufficient to house 4,000 volumes.

The house was built in 1913 for James Donald Cameron Bradley, as a gift for his bride-to-be Helen Sears from her mother, Sarah Choate Sears. The house, intended as a country estate, was designed by Charles Adams Platt, who was then at the pinnacle of his career. It was built not far from the c. 1897 summer house of the Searses, now at 1 Sears Road. It remained in the Bradley family until 1972, when it was sold to the Southborough School for Girls. The school adapted it for its uses, but only occupied it for a few years. In 1984, the estate was sold to developers, who subdivided the land surrounding the house for residential development.

== See also ==
- National Register of Historic Places listings in Worcester County, Massachusetts
