= 1920 United States presidential election in Connecticut =

- November 2, 1920
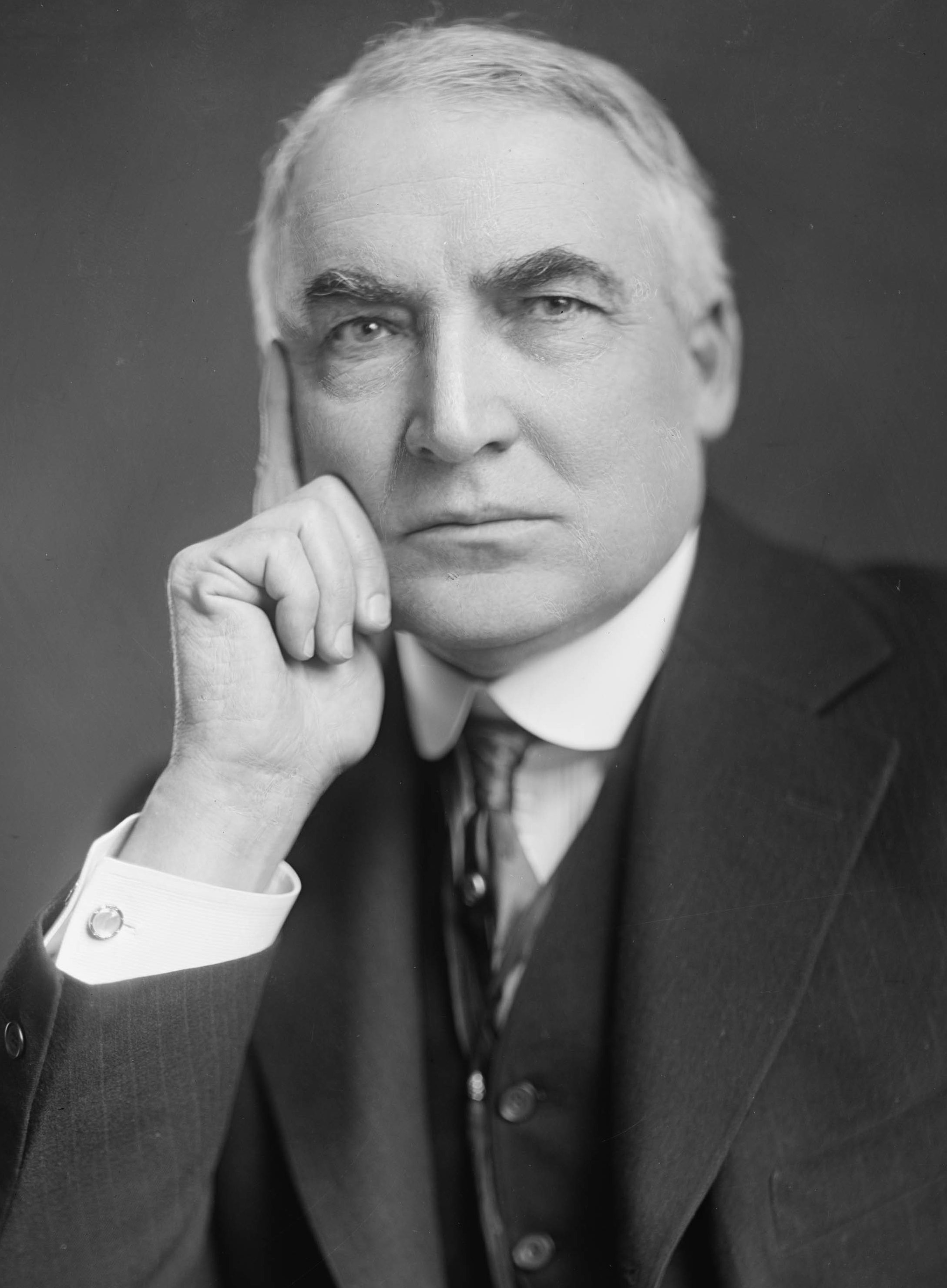

Nominee	Warren G. Harding	James M. Cox
Party	Republican	Democratic
Home state	Ohio	Ohio
Running mate	Calvin Coolidge	Franklin D. Roosevelt
Electoral vote	7	0
Popular vote	229,238	120,721
Percentage	62.72%	33.03%

Harding
40–50%
50–60%
60–70%
70–80%
80–90%
90–100%
Cox
50–60%
President before election
Woodrow Wilson
Democratic
Elected President
Warren G. Harding
Republican

The 1920 United States presidential election in Connecticut took place on November 2, 1920, as part of the 1920 United States presidential election which was held throughout all contemporary 48 states. Voters chose seven representatives, or electors to the Electoral College, who voted for president and vice president.

Connecticut voted for Republican nominee, Senator Warren G. Harding of Ohio, over the Democratic nominee, Governor James M. Cox of Ohio. Harding ran with Governor Calvin Coolidge of Massachusetts, while Cox ran with Assistant Secretary of the Navy Franklin D. Roosevelt of New York.

Harding won Connecticut by a margin of 29.69%. His victory in the New England states was helped by the local popularity of his running mate, Calvin Coolidge, a traditional New England Yankee born in the small-town of Plymouth Notch, Vermont, who had started his political career nearby as Governor of Massachusetts.

== Results ==
1920 United States presidential election in Connecticut
Party	Candidate	Running mate	Popular vote		Electoral vote	
Party	Candidate	Running mate	Count	%	Count	%
Republican	Warren Gamaliel Harding of Ohio	Calvin Coolidge of Massachusetts	229,238	62.72%	7	100.00%
Democratic	James Middleton Cox of Ohio	Franklin Delano Roosevelt of New York	120,721	33.03%	0	0.00%
Socialist	Eugene Victor Debs of Indiana	Seymour Stedman of Illinois	10,350	2.83%	0	0.00%
Farmer–Labor	Parley Parker Christensen of Illinois	Maximillian Sebastian Hayes of Ohio	1,947	0.53%	0	0.00%
Prohibition	Aaron Sherman Watkins of Indiana	David Leigh Colvin of New York	1,771	0.48%	0	0.00%
Socialist Labor	William Wesley Cox of Missouri	August Gillhaus of New York	1,491	0.41%	0	0.00%
Total			365,513	100.00%	7	100.00%

=== Results by town ===
Town	Warren G. Harding Republican		James M. Cox Democratic		Eugene V. Debs Socialist		Parley P. Christensen Farmer-Labor		Aaron Watkins Prohibition		William W. Cox Socialist Labor		Margin		Total votes cast
Town	#	%	#	%	#	%	#	%	#	%	#	%	#	%	Total votes cast
Andover	107	68.59%	47	30.13%	0	0.00%	0	0.00%	2	1.28%	0	0.00%	60	38.46%	156
Ansonia	3,115	57.06%	2,150	39.38%	151	2.77%	17	0.31%	11	0.20%	15	0.27%	965	17.68%	5,459
Ashford	103	52.82%	84	43.08%	1	0.51%	1	0.51%	6	3.08%	0	0.00%	19	9.74%	195
Avon	263	68.31%	119	30.91%	0	0.00%	0	0.00%	2	0.52%	1	0.26%	144	37.40%	385
Barkhamsted	168	75.34%	47	21.08%	3	1.35%	1	0.45%	4	1.79%	0	0.00%	121	54.26%	223
Beacon Falls	175	70.85%	63	25.51%	8	3.24%	0	0.00%	1	0.40%	0	0.00%	112	45.34%	247
Berlin	738	69.62%	284	26.79%	20	1.89%	6	0.57%	10	0.94%	2	0.19%	454	42.83%	1,060
Bethany	70	57.38%	50	40.98%	1	0.82%	0	0.00%	1	0.82%	0	0.00%	20	16.39%	122
Bethel	904	68.38%	397	30.03%	10	0.76%	4	0.30%	6	0.45%	1	0.08%	507	38.35%	1,322
Bethlehem	113	66.86%	55	32.54%	0	0.00%	0	0.00%	1	0.59%	0	0.00%	58	34.32%	169
Bloomfield	425	62.87%	225	33.28%	21	3.11%	4	0.59%	0	0.00%	1	0.15%	200	29.59%	676
Bolton	78	54.17%	63	43.75%	1	0.69%	1	0.69%	1	0.69%	0	0.00%	15	10.42%	144
Bozrah	182	54.49%	148	44.31%	2	0.60%	0	0.00%	1	0.30%	1	0.30%	34	10.18%	334
Branford	1,334	69.05%	525	27.17%	58	3.00%	1	0.05%	8	0.41%	6	0.31%	809	41.87%	1,932
Bridgeport	21,526	63.63%	10,591	31.31%	1,274	3.77%	246	0.73%	64	0.19%	128	0.38%	10,935	32.32%	33,829
Bridgewater	99	52.11%	91	47.89%	0	0.00%	0	0.00%	0	0.00%	0	0.00%	8	4.21%	190
Bristol	3,429	63.78%	1,770	32.92%	106	1.97%	20	0.37%	42	0.78%	9	0.17%	1,659	30.86%	5,376
Brookfield	265	74.65%	84	23.66%	1	0.28%	0	0.00%	5	1.41%	0	0.00%	181	50.99%	355
Brooklyn	304	62.55%	176	36.21%	3	0.62%	0	0.00%	2	0.41%	1	0.21%	128	26.34%	486
Burlington	178	70.63%	74	29.37%	0	0.00%	0	0.00%	0	0.00%	0	0.00%	104	41.27%	252
Canaan	169	75.11%	53	23.56%	0	0.00%	0	0.00%	3	1.33%	0	0.00%	116	51.56%	225
Canterbury	169	67.06%	79	31.35%	0	0.00%	1	0.40%	3	1.19%	0	0.00%	90	35.71%	252
Canton	649	72.03%	243	26.97%	4	0.44%	1	0.11%	4	0.44%	0	0.00%	406	45.06%	901
Chaplin	97	77.60%	25	20.00%	2	1.60%	0	0.00%	1	0.80%	0	0.00%	72	57.60%	125
Cheshire	598	76.18%	170	21.66%	5	0.64%	5	0.64%	6	0.76%	1	0.13%	428	54.52%	785
Chester	316	73.66%	104	24.24%	5	1.17%	1	0.23%	2	0.47%	1	0.23%	212	49.42%	429
Clinton	312	81.25%	50	13.02%	2	0.52%	3	0.78%	17	4.43%	0	0.00%	262	68.23%	384
Colchester	339	67.66%	138	27.54%	19	3.79%	3	0.60%	2	0.40%	0	0.00%	201	40.12%	501
Colebrook	112	77.78%	30	20.83%	0	0.00%	1	0.69%	1	0.69%	0	0.00%	82	56.94%	144
Columbia	151	75.50%	46	23.00%	3	1.50%	0	0.00%	0	0.00%	0	0.00%	105	52.50%	200
Cornwall	238	56.67%	176	41.90%	3	0.71%	1	0.24%	2	0.48%	0	0.00%	62	14.76%	420
Coventry	421	65.17%	223	34.52%	0	0.00%	1	0.15%	1	0.15%	0	0.00%	198	30.65%	646
Cromwell	497	78.89%	112	17.78%	9	1.43%	7	1.11%	4	0.63%	1	0.16%	385	61.11%	630
Danbury	4,769	60.88%	2,842	36.28%	126	1.61%	16	0.20%	66	0.84%	15	0.19%	1,927	24.60%	7,834
Darien	878	80.48%	192	17.60%	13	1.19%	5	0.46%	3	0.27%	0	0.00%	686	62.88%	1,091
Derby	1,461	49.44%	1,391	47.07%	76	2.57%	12	0.41%	5	0.17%	10	0.34%	70	2.37%	2,955
Durham	230	69.28%	100	30.12%	0	0.00%	0	0.00%	1	0.30%	1	0.30%	130	39.16%	332
East Granby	210	70.00%	87	29.00%	0	0.00%	1	0.33%	1	0.33%	1	0.33%	123	41.00%	300
East Haddam	419	81.68%	89	17.35%	3	0.58%	0	0.00%	2	0.39%	0	0.00%	330	64.33%	513
East Hampton	569	62.80%	296	32.67%	21	2.32%	5	0.55%	15	1.66%	0	0.00%	273	30.13%	906
East Hartford	1,797	59.98%	1,075	35.88%	53	1.77%	39	1.30%	11	0.37%	21	0.70%	722	24.10%	2,996
East Haven	679	72.85%	209	22.42%	35	3.76%	0	0.00%	3	0.32%	6	0.64%	470	50.43%	932
East Lyme	452	71.41%	166	26.22%	3	0.47%	1	0.16%	10	1.58%	1	0.16%	286	45.18%	633
East Windsor	703	66.64%	316	29.95%	26	2.46%	3	0.28%	5	0.47%	2	0.19%	387	36.68%	1,055
Eastford	129	79.14%	32	19.63%	0	0.00%	1	0.61%	1	0.61%	0	0.00%	97	59.51%	163
Easton	210	67.09%	101	32.27%	0	0.00%	1	0.32%	1	0.32%	0	0.00%	109	34.82%	313
Ellington	402	66.45%	175	28.93%	18	2.98%	1	0.17%	3	0.50%	6	0.99%	227	37.52%	605
Enfield	1,776	61.33%	1,085	37.47%	9	0.31%	2	0.07%	20	0.69%	4	0.14%	691	23.86%	2,896
Essex	711	73.53%	239	24.72%	6	0.62%	3	0.31%	8	0.83%	0	0.00%	472	48.81%	967
Fairfield	1,528	72.87%	500	23.84%	26	1.24%	19	0.91%	14	0.67%	10	0.48%	1,028	49.02%	2,097
Farmington	839	58.14%	590	40.89%	10	0.69%	0	0.00%	4	0.28%	0	0.00%	249	17.26%	1,443
Franklin	139	85.80%	23	14.20%	0	0.00%	0	0.00%	0	0.00%	0	0.00%	116	71.60%	162
Glastonbury	820	59.68%	529	38.50%	14	1.02%	9	0.66%	1	0.07%	1	0.07%	291	21.18%	1,374
Goshen	149	76.41%	43	22.05%	0	0.00%	0	0.00%	3	1.54%	0	0.00%	106	54.36%	195
Granby	311	75.85%	91	22.20%	0	0.00%	0	0.00%	8	1.95%	0	0.00%	220	53.66%	410
Greenwich	3,669	75.12%	1,096	22.44%	76	1.56%	24	0.49%	7	0.14%	12	0.25%	2,573	52.68%	4,884
Griswold	568	54.51%	466	44.72%	2	0.19%	0	0.00%	5	0.48%	1	0.10%	102	9.79%	1,042
Groton	1,570	70.98%	574	25.95%	42	1.90%	3	0.14%	19	0.86%	4	0.18%	996	45.03%	2,212
Guilford	675	76.19%	168	18.96%	13	1.47%	2	0.23%	26	2.93%	2	0.23%	507	57.22%	886
Haddam	357	68.52%	163	31.29%	0	0.00%	0	0.00%	1	0.19%	0	0.00%	194	37.24%	521
Hamden	1,673	76.95%	351	16.15%	117	5.38%	4	0.18%	10	0.46%	19	0.87%	1,322	60.81%	2,174
Hampton	153	82.26%	32	17.20%	0	0.00%	1	0.54%	0	0.00%	0	0.00%	121	65.05%	186
Hartford	21,257	55.52%	14,412	37.64%	1,486	3.88%	713	1.86%	195	0.51%	221	0.58%	6,845	17.88%	38,284
Hartland	85	80.19%	20	18.87%	0	0.00%	0	0.00%	1	0.94%	0	0.00%	65	61.32%	106
Harwinton	219	75.00%	59	20.21%	10	3.42%	1	0.34%	1	0.34%	2	0.68%	160	54.79%	292
Hebron	189	74.41%	65	25.59%	0	0.00%	0	0.00%	0	0.00%	0	0.00%	124	48.82%	254
Kent	250	70.03%	106	29.69%	0	0.00%	0	0.00%	1	0.28%	0	0.00%	144	40.34%	357
Killingly	1,324	70.73%	518	27.67%	8	0.43%	0	0.00%	20	1.07%	2	0.11%	806	43.06%	1,872
Killingworth	99	74.44%	28	21.05%	5	3.76%	1	0.75%	0	0.00%	0	0.00%	71	53.38%	133
Lebanon	320	92.49%	25	7.23%	0	0.00%	0	0.00%	1	0.29%	0	0.00%	295	85.26%	346
Ledyard	186	70.72%	73	27.76%	2	0.76%	0	0.00%	2	0.76%	0	0.00%	113	42.97%	263
Lisbon	156	73.58%	46	21.70%	9	4.25%	0	0.00%	1	0.47%	0	0.00%	110	51.89%	212
Litchfield	711	61.99%	400	34.87%	25	2.18%	0	0.00%	10	0.87%	1	0.09%	311	27.11%	1,147
Lyme	174	79.09%	42	19.09%	1	0.45%	0	0.00%	3	1.36%	0	0.00%	132	60.00%	220
Madison	445	87.60%	34	6.69%	14	2.76%	2	0.39%	13	2.56%	0	0.00%	411	80.91%	508
Manchester	3,017	65.64%	1,316	28.63%	150	3.26%	9	0.20%	73	1.59%	31	0.67%	1,701	37.01%	4,596
Mansfield	452	73.62%	155	25.24%	2	0.33%	0	0.00%	5	0.81%	0	0.00%	297	48.37%	614
Marlborough	63	55.26%	49	42.98%	1	0.88%	0	0.00%	1	0.88%	0	0.00%	14	12.28%	114
Meriden	7,258	62.50%	3,959	34.09%	285	2.45%	16	0.14%	59	0.51%	36	0.31%	3,299	28.41%	11,613
Middlebury	200	74.07%	63	23.33%	4	1.48%	0	0.00%	3	1.11%	0	0.00%	137	50.74%	270
Middlefield	179	83.26%	35	16.28%	1	0.47%	0	0.00%	0	0.00%	0	0.00%	144	66.98%	215
Middletown	3,005	57.68%	2,065	39.64%	67	1.29%	52	1.00%	9	0.17%	12	0.23%	940	18.04%	5,210
Milford	2,476	76.11%	606	18.63%	100	3.07%	13	0.40%	49	1.51%	9	0.28%	1,870	57.49%	3,253
Monroe	265	68.83%	114	29.61%	4	1.04%	0	0.00%	1	0.26%	1	0.26%	151	39.22%	385
Montville	542	74.35%	167	22.91%	14	1.92%	2	0.27%	4	0.55%	0	0.00%	375	51.44%	729
Morris	113	57.95%	80	41.03%	0	0.00%	0	0.00%	2	1.03%	0	0.00%	33	16.92%	195
Naugatuck	2,084	53.67%	1,593	41.02%	171	4.40%	8	0.21%	10	0.26%	17	0.44%	491	12.64%	3,883
New Britain	8,192	63.49%	3,863	29.94%	455	3.53%	213	1.65%	92	0.71%	88	0.68%	4,329	33.55%	12,903
New Canaan	948	76.51%	267	21.55%	13	1.05%	5	0.40%	6	0.48%	0	0.00%	681	54.96%	1,239
New Fairfield	109	72.19%	40	26.49%	0	0.00%	0	0.00%	2	1.32%	0	0.00%	69	45.70%	151
New Hartford	325	60.07%	212	39.19%	0	0.00%	1	0.18%	2	0.37%	1	0.18%	113	20.89%	541
New Haven	24,297	59.77%	13,605	33.47%	2,258	5.55%	64	0.16%	118	0.29%	307	0.76%	10,692	26.30%	40,649
New London	4,088	62.39%	2,245	34.26%	135	2.06%	9	0.14%	48	0.73%	27	0.41%	1,843	28.13%	6,552
New Milford	1,011	62.64%	571	35.38%	16	0.99%	5	0.31%	11	0.68%	0	0.00%	440	27.26%	1,614
Newington	408	70.83%	140	24.31%	12	2.08%	7	1.22%	8	1.39%	1	0.17%	268	46.53%	576
Newtown	540	49.86%	527	48.66%	7	0.65%	1	0.09%	7	0.65%	1	0.09%	13	1.20%	1,083
Norfolk	350	57.19%	256	41.83%	1	0.16%	1	0.16%	2	0.33%	2	0.33%	94	15.36%	612
North Branford	185	78.72%	47	20.00%	0	0.00%	1	0.43%	2	0.85%	0	0.00%	138	58.72%	235
North Canaan	462	69.06%	200	29.90%	1	0.15%	1	0.15%	2	0.30%	3	0.45%	262	39.16%	669
North Haven	546	83.87%	83	12.75%	11	1.69%	0	0.00%	11	1.69%	0	0.00%	463	71.12%	651
North Stonington	194	56.56%	133	38.78%	4	1.17%	2	0.58%	7	2.04%	3	0.87%	61	17.78%	343
Norwalk	5,199	70.11%	2,042	27.54%	102	1.38%	25	0.34%	22	0.30%	25	0.34%	3,157	42.58%	7,415
Norwich	4,887	57.95%	3,296	39.08%	187	2.22%	18	0.21%	30	0.36%	15	0.18%	1,591	18.87%	8,433
Old Lyme	265	60.36%	166	37.81%	3	0.68%	1	0.23%	3	0.68%	1	0.23%	99	22.55%	439
Old Saybrook	238	73.46%	82	25.31%	2	0.62%	1	0.31%	0	0.00%	1	0.31%	156	48.15%	324
Orange	3,242	71.10%	1,032	22.63%	230	5.04%	6	0.13%	19	0.42%	31	0.68%	2,210	48.46%	4,560
Oxford	192	71.11%	78	28.89%	0	0.00%	0	0.00%	0	0.00%	0	0.00%	114	42.22%	270
Plainfield	888	55.22%	703	43.72%	12	0.75%	1	0.06%	2	0.12%	2	0.12%	185	11.50%	1,608
Plainville	858	72.84%	275	23.34%	27	2.29%	1	0.08%	14	1.19%	3	0.25%	583	49.49%	1,178
Plymouth	736	60.83%	408	33.72%	32	2.64%	11	0.91%	20	1.65%	3	0.25%	328	27.11%	1,210
Pomfret	373	72.99%	132	25.83%	3	0.59%	0	0.00%	2	0.39%	1	0.20%	241	47.16%	511
Portland	795	55.17%	612	42.47%	2	0.14%	20	1.39%	8	0.56%	4	0.28%	183	12.70%	1,441
Preston	267	72.36%	93	25.20%	6	1.63%	0	0.00%	3	0.81%	0	0.00%	174	47.15%	369
Prospect	118	83.69%	19	13.48%	4	2.84%	0	0.00%	0	0.00%	0	0.00%	99	70.21%	141
Putnam	1,321	60.43%	848	38.79%	7	0.32%	5	0.23%	5	0.23%	0	0.00%	473	21.64%	2,186
Redding	358	62.81%	206	36.14%	1	0.18%	0	0.00%	5	0.88%	0	0.00%	152	26.67%	570
Ridgefield	691	77.82%	174	19.59%	5	0.56%	4	0.45%	6	0.68%	8	0.90%	517	58.22%	888
Rocky Hill	283	67.38%	126	30.00%	3	0.71%	3	0.71%	5	1.19%	0	0.00%	157	37.38%	420
Roxbury	121	59.61%	79	38.92%	1	0.49%	0	0.00%	2	0.99%	0	0.00%	42	20.69%	203
Salem	66	80.49%	16	19.51%	0	0.00%	0	0.00%	0	0.00%	0	0.00%	50	60.98%	82
Salisbury	616	67.99%	287	31.68%	0	0.00%	2	0.22%	1	0.11%	0	0.00%	329	36.31%	906
Saybrook	545	76.87%	155	21.86%	5	0.71%	2	0.28%	1	0.14%	1	0.14%	390	55.01%	709
Scotland	116	72.96%	31	19.50%	3	1.89%	0	0.00%	9	5.66%	0	0.00%	85	53.46%	159
Seymour	1,311	76.00%	398	23.07%	15	0.87%	1	0.06%	0	0.00%	0	0.00%	913	52.93%	1,725
Sharon	364	74.13%	124	25.25%	0	0.00%	0	0.00%	3	0.61%	0	0.00%	240	48.88%	491
Shelton	1,553	65.28%	697	29.30%	104	4.37%	6	0.25%	6	0.25%	13	0.55%	856	35.98%	2,379
Sherman	131	73.18%	44	24.58%	0	0.00%	2	1.12%	1	0.56%	1	0.56%	87	48.60%	179
Simsbury	502	60.41%	305	36.70%	3	0.36%	3	0.36%	18	2.17%	0	0.00%	197	23.71%	831
Somers	303	69.18%	129	29.45%	4	0.91%	0	0.00%	1	0.23%	1	0.23%	174	39.73%	438
South Windsor	358	62.70%	192	33.63%	5	0.88%	6	1.05%	9	1.58%	1	0.18%	166	29.07%	571
Southbury	246	66.13%	125	33.60%	1	0.27%	0	0.00%	0	0.00%	0	0.00%	121	32.53%	372
Southington	1,286	66.32%	585	30.17%	42	2.17%	5	0.26%	14	0.72%	7	0.36%	701	36.15%	1,939
Sprague	388	58.97%	242	36.78%	11	1.67%	4	0.61%	13	1.98%	0	0.00%	146	22.19%	658
Stafford	815	61.56%	428	32.33%	48	3.63%	1	0.08%	7	0.53%	25	1.89%	387	29.23%	1,324
Stamford	7,129	65.44%	3,512	32.24%	175	1.61%	21	0.19%	21	0.19%	36	0.33%	3,617	33.20%	10,894
Sterling	211	59.44%	138	38.87%	4	1.13%	0	0.00%	0	0.00%	2	0.56%	73	20.56%	355
Stonington	1,809	63.65%	869	30.58%	93	3.27%	14	0.49%	21	0.74%	36	1.27%	940	33.08%	2,842
Stratford	2,415	75.71%	569	17.84%	128	4.01%	31	0.97%	22	0.69%	25	0.78%	1,846	57.87%	3,190
Suffield	913	72.75%	330	26.29%	3	0.24%	2	0.16%	6	0.48%	1	0.08%	583	46.45%	1,255
Thomaston	841	66.22%	411	32.36%	13	1.02%	2	0.16%	2	0.16%	1	0.08%	430	33.86%	1,270
Thompson	597	61.48%	365	37.59%	7	0.72%	1	0.10%	1	0.10%	0	0.00%	232	23.89%	971
Tolland	127	49.80%	113	44.31%	3	1.18%	1	0.39%	5	1.96%	6	2.35%	14	5.49%	255
Torrington	3,524	66.39%	1,581	29.79%	138	2.60%	18	0.34%	17	0.32%	30	0.57%	1,943	36.61%	5,308
Trumbull	558	73.32%	185	24.31%	7	0.92%	7	0.92%	2	0.26%	2	0.26%	373	49.01%	761
Union	55	63.95%	31	36.05%	0	0.00%	0	0.00%	0	0.00%	0	0.00%	24	27.91%	86
Vernon	1,764	64.26%	812	29.58%	132	4.81%	4	0.15%	10	0.36%	23	0.84%	952	34.68%	2,745
Voluntown	125	65.10%	65	33.85%	1	0.52%	0	0.00%	0	0.00%	1	0.52%	60	31.25%	192
Wallingford	2,024	62.07%	1,096	33.61%	108	3.31%	5	0.15%	23	0.71%	5	0.15%	928	28.46%	3,261
Warren	90	67.67%	37	27.82%	1	0.75%	1	0.75%	3	2.26%	1	0.75%	53	39.85%	133
Washington	469	68.17%	212	30.81%	2	0.29%	2	0.29%	3	0.44%	0	0.00%	257	37.35%	688
Waterbury	11,161	50.39%	10,110	45.64%	743	3.35%	24	0.11%	35	0.16%	78	0.35%	1,051	4.74%	22,151
Waterford	705	73.74%	216	22.59%	23	2.41%	3	0.31%	5	0.52%	4	0.42%	489	51.15%	956
Watertown	930	76.48%	261	21.46%	17	1.40%	0	0.00%	4	0.33%	4	0.33%	669	55.02%	1,216
West Hartford	2,310	72.92%	747	23.58%	52	1.64%	24	0.76%	12	0.38%	23	0.73%	1,563	49.34%	3,168
Westbrook	175	74.79%	40	17.09%	8	3.42%	1	0.43%	3	1.28%	7	2.99%	135	57.69%	234
Weston	158	69.00%	65	28.38%	1	0.44%	3	1.31%	1	0.44%	1	0.44%	93	40.61%	229
Westport	1,038	71.00%	383	26.20%	35	2.39%	0	0.00%	2	0.14%	4	0.27%	655	44.80%	1,462
Wethersfield	916	68.36%	390	29.10%	14	1.04%	10	0.75%	7	0.52%	3	0.22%	526	39.25%	1,340
Willington	271	90.94%	21	7.05%	1	0.34%	1	0.34%	4	1.34%	0	0.00%	250	83.89%	298
Wilton	410	72.82%	133	23.62%	7	1.24%	2	0.36%	11	1.95%	0	0.00%	277	49.20%	563
Winchester	1,788	62.74%	1,025	35.96%	16	0.56%	8	0.28%	11	0.39%	2	0.07%	763	26.77%	2,850
Windham	2,410	55.81%	1,830	42.38%	36	0.83%	13	0.30%	29	0.67%	0	0.00%	580	13.43%	4,318
Windsor	974	66.85%	433	29.72%	18	1.24%	12	0.82%	19	1.30%	1	0.07%	541	37.13%	1,457
Windsor Locks	486	43.51%	616	55.15%	6	0.54%	3	0.27%	3	0.27%	3	0.27%	-130	-11.64%	1,117
Wolcott	137	83.03%	26	15.76%	2	1.21%	0	0.00%	0	0.00%	0	0.00%	111	67.27%	165
Woodbridge	236	85.82%	26	9.45%	7	2.55%	0	0.00%	6	2.18%	0	0.00%	210	76.36%	275
Woodbury	437	75.47%	134	23.14%	5	0.86%	1	0.17%	2	0.35%	0	0.00%	303	52.33%	579
Woodstock	399	82.27%	78	16.08%	3	0.62%	1	0.21%	4	0.82%	0	0.00%	321	66.19%	485
Totals	229,238	62.72%	120,721	33.03%	10,350	2.83%	1,947	0.53%	1,771	0.48%	1,491	0.41%	108,517	29.69%	365,518

== See also ==
- United States presidential elections in Connecticut
