= Gary Mendell =

Gary Mendell is the Chairman of HEI Hotels & Resorts, and Founder and CEO of Shatterproof.org.

Gary Mendell is the founder and CEO of Shatterproof. Mendell founded Shatterproof following his son Brian's death in 2011 due to addiction. Mendell is the founder and former CEO of HEI Hotels & Resorts and the former president of Starwood Lodging Trust.

A Cornell ('79) and the Wharton grad, Mendell went on to co-found HEI's predecessor in 1985, which became one of the fastest-growing hotel investment firms in the United States. In 1997, HEI sold a majority of its hotels to Starwood Lodging and Trust where Gary was named president and elected to the Starwood Board of Trustees. Gary resigned from his position in 1998 to pursue entrepreneurial activities and has since raised two discretionary private equity funds with some of the nation's university endowments, a $275 million fund in 2004 and a $425 million fund in 2006.
