= 2020 United States presidential election in Connecticut =

- November 3, 2020
- Turnout: 79.70% ▲

Nominee	Joe Biden	Donald Trump
Party	Democratic	Republican
Home state	Delaware	Florida
Running mate	Kamala Harris	Mike Pence
Electoral vote	7	0
Popular vote	1,080,831	714,717
Percentage	59.26%	39.19%

Biden
40–50%
50–60%
60–70%
70–80%
80–90%
90–100%
Trump
40–50%
50–60%
60–70%
President before election
Donald Trump
Republican
Elected President
Joe Biden
Democratic

The 2020 United States presidential election in Connecticut was held on Tuesday, November 3, 2020, as part of the 2020 United States presidential election in which all 50 states plus the District of Columbia participated. Connecticut voters chose electors to represent them in the Electoral College via a popular vote, pitting the Republican Party's nominee, incumbent President Donald Trump, and running mate Vice President Mike Pence against Democratic Party nominee, former Vice President Joe Biden, and his running mate California Senator Kamala Harris. Connecticut has seven electoral votes in the Electoral College.

Prior to the election, Connecticut was considered to be a state Biden would win or a safe blue state. Biden went on to win by a 20.07% margin.

Connecticut voted 16% more Democratic than the national average.

== Primary elections ==
The primary elections were originally scheduled for April 28, 2020. On March 19, they were moved to June 2 due to concerns over the COVID-19 pandemic. Then on April 17, they were further pushed back to August 11.

=== Republican primary ===
The state had 28 delegates to the 2020 Republican National Convention, all going to Trump.

2020 Connecticut Republican presidential primary
Candidate	Votes	%	Delegates
Donald Trump (incumbent)	71,667	78.4%	28
Uncommitted	12,994	14.2%	
Rocky De La Fuente (withdrawn)	6,791	7.4%	
Total	91,452	100%	28

=== Democratic primary ===
2020 Connecticut Democratic presidential primary
Candidate	Votes	%	Delegates
Joe Biden	224,500	84.90	60
Bernie Sanders (withdrawn)	30,512	11.54	
Tulsi Gabbard (withdrawn)	3,429	1.30	
Uncommitted	5,975	2.26	
Total	264,416	100%	60

=== Libertarian caucus ===
2020 Connecticut Libertarian presidential caucus
- April 25–28, 2020
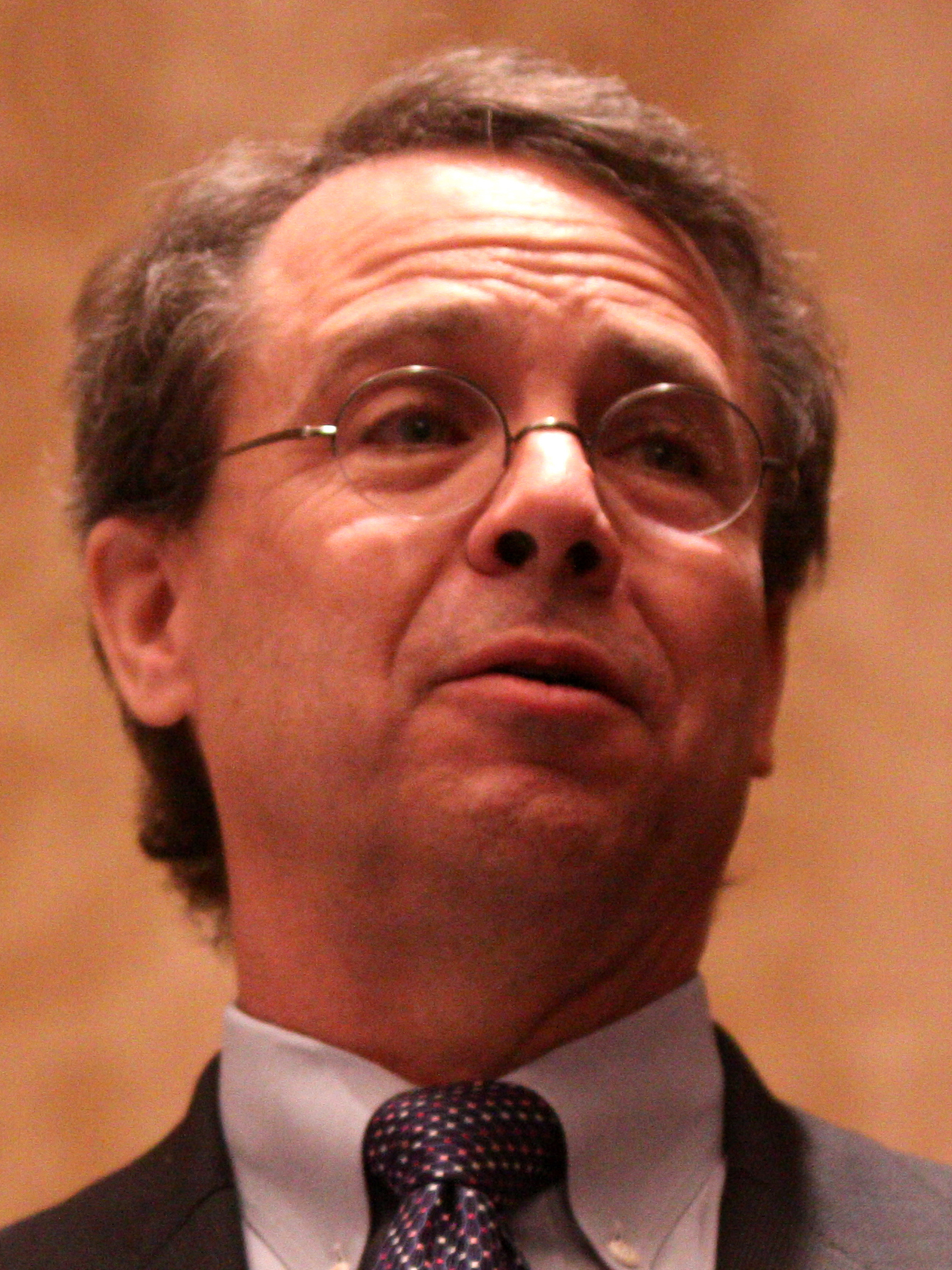

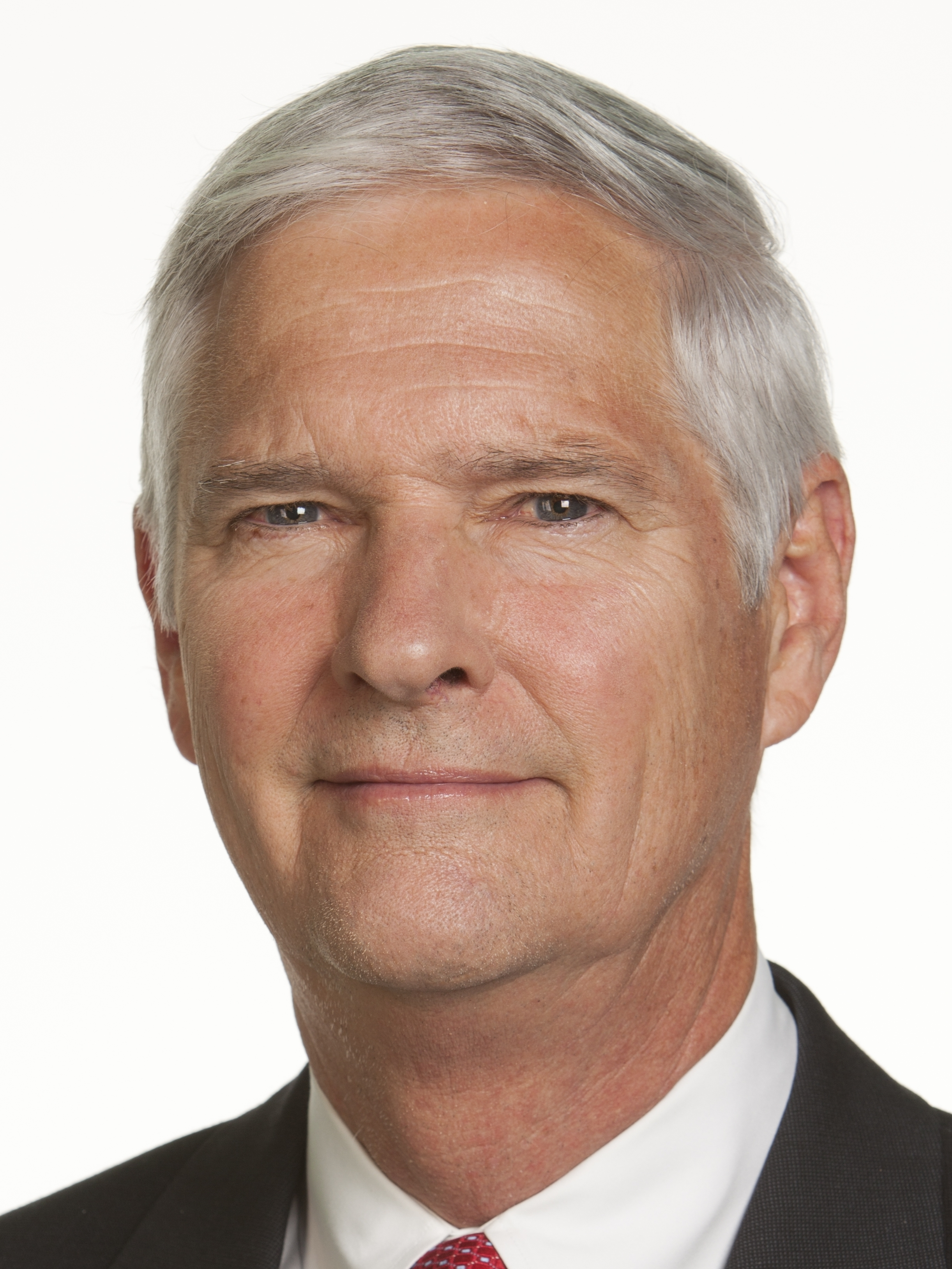

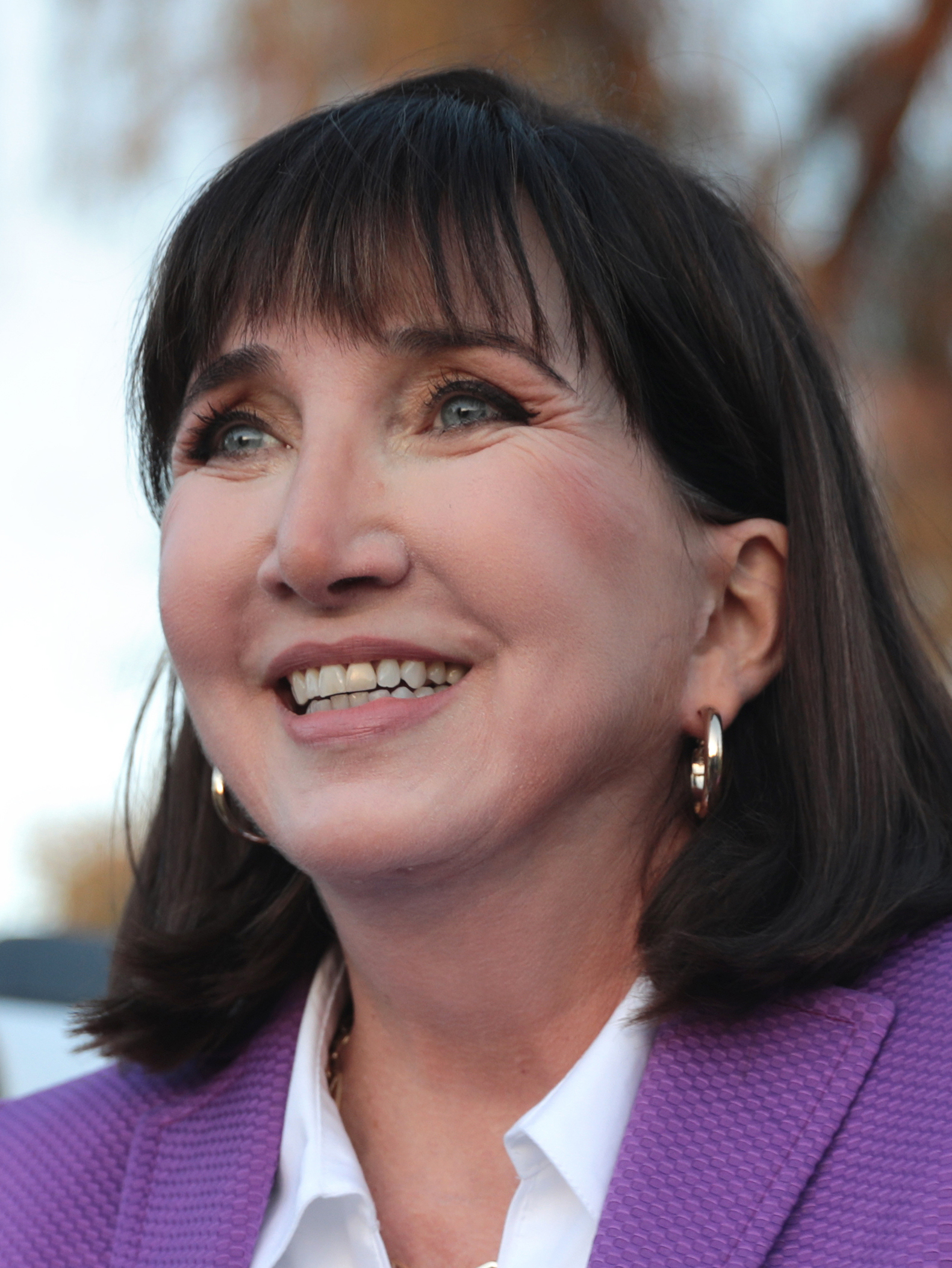

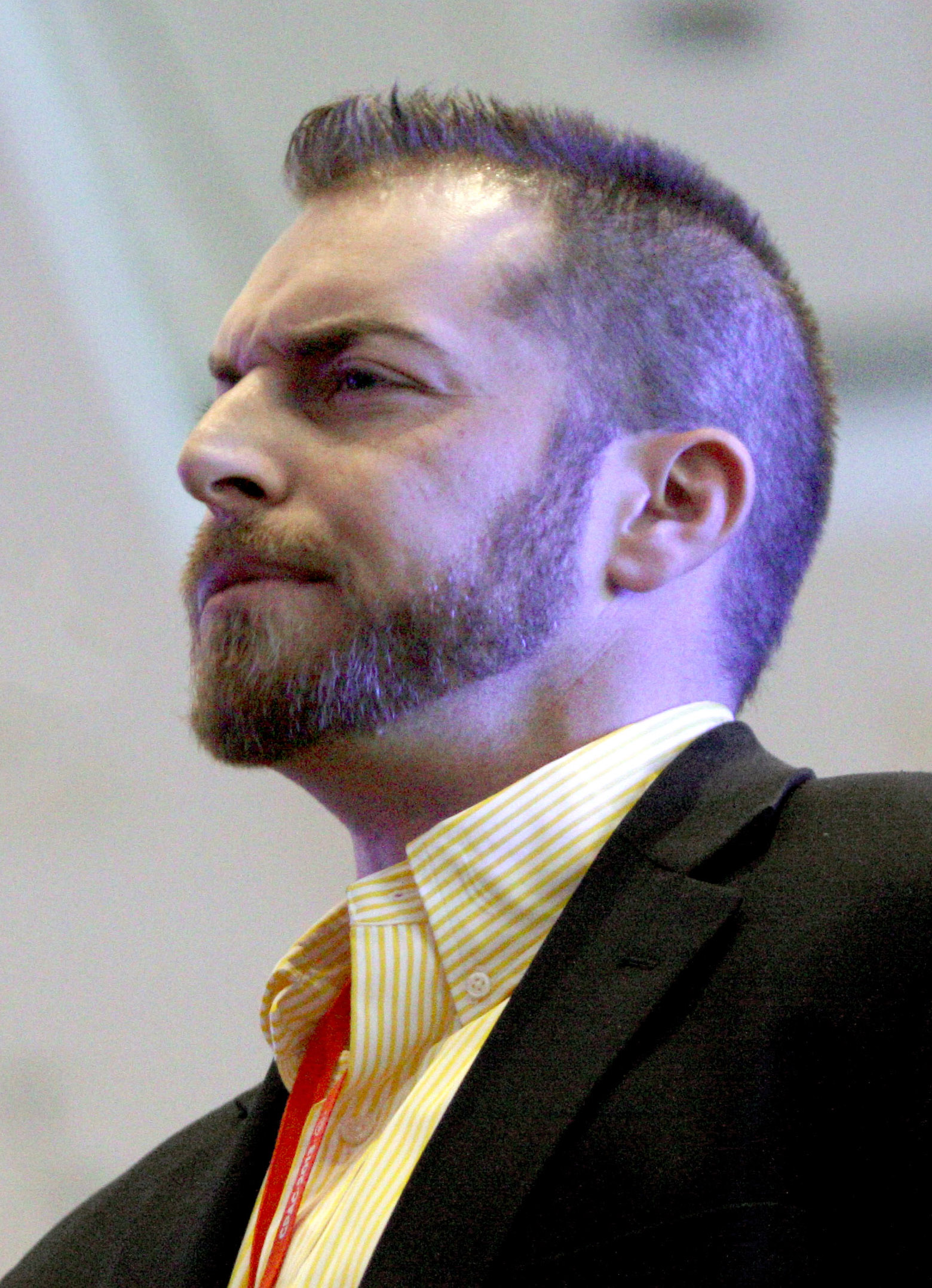

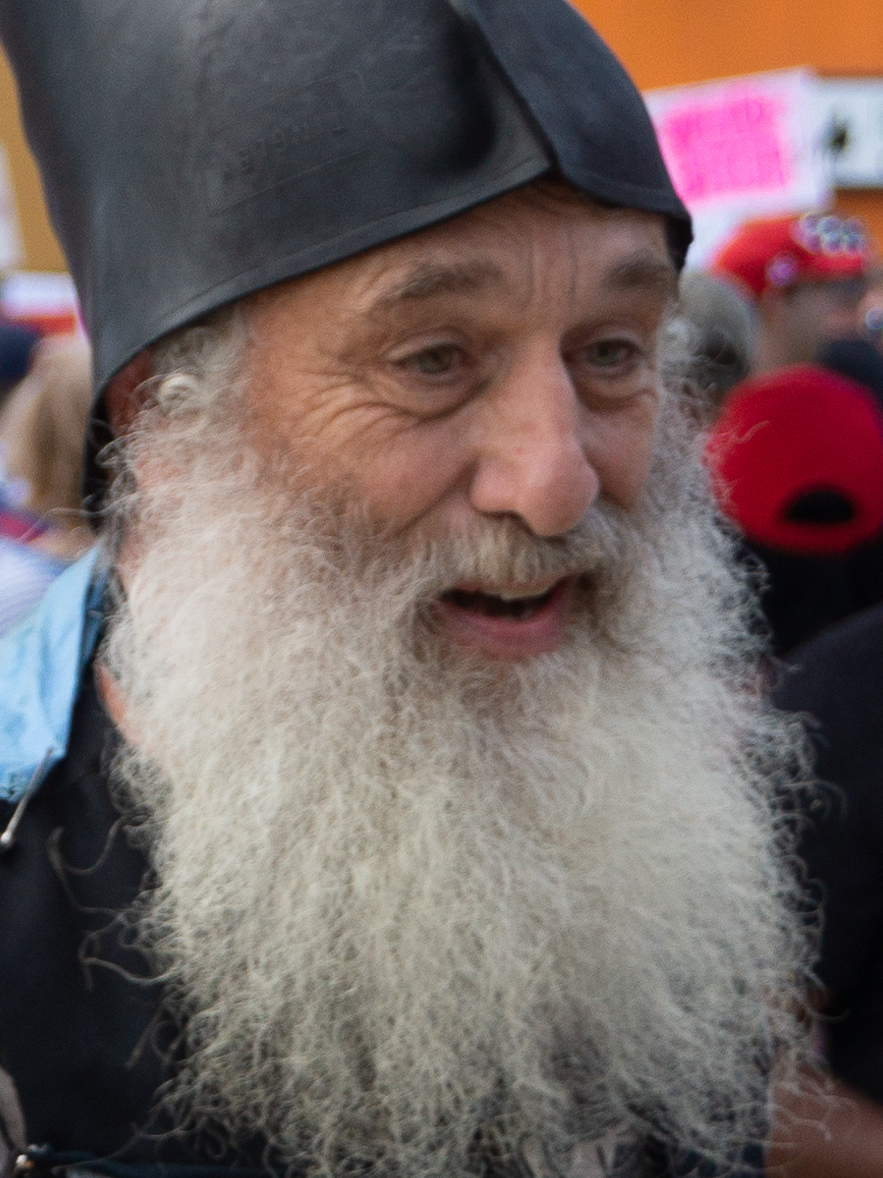
Candidate	Jacob Hornberger	Jim Gray	Jo Jorgensen
Home state	Virginia	California	South Carolina
First vote	47 (31.7%)	23 (13.8%)	18 (10.8%)
Final vote	85 (66.9%)	42 (33.1%)	Eliminated
Candidate	Adam Kokesh	Vermin Supreme
Home state	Indiana	Massachusetts
First vote	14 (8.4%)	14 (8.4%)
Final vote	Eliminated	Eliminated

Voting took place from April 25–28, 2020.

Connecticut Libertarian presidential caucus
Candidate	Round 1			Round 19	
Candidate	Votes	%	Transfer	Votes	%
Jacob Hornberger	47	31.7%	+ 48	85	66.9%
James P. Gray	23	13.8%	+ 19	42	33.1%
Jo Jorgensen	18	10.8%	34	Eliminated in round 18	
Adam Kokesh	14	8.4%	22	Eliminated in round 17	
Vermin Supreme	14	8.4%	16	Eliminated in round 16	
Brian Ellison	6	3.6%	11	Eliminated in round 15	
Souraya Faas	4	2.4%	8	Eliminated in round 14	
N.O.T.A	8	4.2%	8	Eliminated in round 13	
Dan Behrman	5	3.0%	5	Eliminated in round 12	
Sorinne Ardeleanu	4	2.4%	5	Eliminated in round 11	
Sam Robb	4	2.4%	5	Eliminated in round 10	
Arvin Vohra	4	2.4%	4	Eliminated in round 9	
John Monds	4	2.4%	4	Eliminated in round 8	
Ken Armstrong	1	0.6%	3	Eliminated in round 7	
Phil Gray	2	1.2%	2	Eliminated in round 6	
Steve Richey	1	0.6%	1	Eliminated in round 5	
Erik Gerhardt	1	0.6%	1	Eliminated in round 4	
Jedidiah Hill	1	0.6%	1	Eliminated in round 3	
Louis Vanacore	1	0.6%	1	Eliminated in round 2	
Kenneth Blevins, James Ogle, Rhett Smith	0	0.0%	0	Eliminated in round 1	
Round 1 total	167	100.0%	Round 9 total	167 (40 exhausted)	100.0%

== General election ==
=== Predictions ===
Source	Ranking	As of
The Cook Political Report	Safe D	September 10, 2020
Inside Elections	Safe D	September 4, 2020
Sabato's Crystal Ball	Safe D	July 14, 2020
Politico	Safe D	September 8, 2020
RCP	Likely D	November 3, 2020
Niskanen	Safe D	July 26, 2020
CNN	Safe D	August 3, 2020
The Economist	Safe D	September 2, 2020
CBS News	Likely D	August 16, 2020
270towin	Safe D	August 2, 2020
ABC News	Safe D	July 31, 2020
NPR	Likely D	August 3, 2020
NBC News	Likely D	August 6, 2020
538	Safe D	September 9, 2020

=== Polling ===
View source data.

Aggregate polls

Source of poll aggregation	Dates administered	Dates updated	Joe Biden Democratic	Donald Trump Republican	Other/ Undecided (Note: Calculated by taking the difference of 100% and all other candidates combined.)	Margin
FiveThirtyEight	until November 2, 2020	November 3, 2020	58.6%	32.4%	9.0%	Biden +26.3

Polls

Poll source	Date(s) administered	Sample size (Note: Key: A – all adults RV – registered voters LV – likely voters V – unclear)	Margin of error	Donald Trump Republican	Joe Biden Democratic	Jo Jorgensen Libertarian	Howie Hawkins Green	Other	Undecided
SurveyMonkey/Axios	Oct 20 – Nov 2, 2020	2,031 (LV)	± 3.5%	38% (Note: Overlapping sample with the previous SurveyMonkey/Axios poll, but more information available regarding sample size)	60%	-	-	–	–
Swayable (Note: Archived November 27, 2020, at the Wayback Machine)	Oct 23 – Nov 1, 2020	367 (LV)	± 6.2%	33%	64%	2%	1%	–	–
SurveyMonkey/Axios	Oct 1–28, 2020	3,782 (LV)	–	35%	63%	-	-	–	–
Sacred Heart University (Note: Archived November 1, 2020, at the Wayback Machine)	Oct 8–21, 2020	1,000 (A)	± 3.02%	26%	51%	-	-	2%	20%
SurveyMonkey/Axios	Sep 1–30, 2020	1,415 (LV)	–	37%	61%	-	-	–	2%
SurveyMonkey/Axios	Aug 1–31, 2020	1,009 (LV)	–	35%	64%	-	-	–	1%
SurveyMonkey/Axios	Jul 1–31, 2020	1,360 (LV)	–	39%	59%	-	-	–	2%
SurveyMonkey/Axios	Jun 8–30, 2020	574 (LV)	–	32%	65%	-	-	–	3%
SurveyUSA	May 19–24, 2020	808 (RV)	± 4.5%	33%	52%	-	-	7% (Note: "Someone else" with 7%)	8%
Quinnipiac University	Apr 30 – May 4, 2020	945 (RV)	± 3.2%	33%	56%	-	-	3% (Note: "Someone else" with 2%; would not vote with 1%)	7%
Sacred Heart University/Hartford Courant	Mar 24 – Apr 3, 2020	1,000 (A)	± 3.0%	34%	47%	-	-	–	–
Sacred Heart University/Hartford Courant	Feb 24 – Mar 12, 2020	1,000 (A)	± 3.0%	36%	52%	-	-	–	–
Sacred Heart University/Hartford Courant	Dec 16, 2019 – Jan 2, 2020	1,000 (A)	± 3.0%	32%	52%	-	-	–	16%
Sacred Heart University/Hartford Courant	Sep 17 – Oct 2, 2019	1,000 (A)	± 3.2%	33%	52%	-	-	–	15%

Former candidates

with Donald Trump and Pete Buttigieg

Poll source	Date(s) administered	Sample size	Margin of error	Donald Trump (R)	Pete Buttigieg (D)	Undecided
Sacred Heart University/Hartford Courant/Institute for Public Policy	Dec 16, 2019 – Jan 2, 2020	1000 (A)	± 3.%	33%	47%	20%
Sacred Heart University/Hartford Courant	Sep 17 – Oct 2, 2019	1,000 (A)	± 3.2%	34%	46%	20%

with Donald Trump and Kamala Harris

Poll source	Date(s) administered	Sample size	Margin of error	Donald Trump (R)	Kamala Harris (D)	Undecided
Sacred Heart University/Hartford Courant	Sep 17 – Oct 2, 2019	1,000 (A)	± 3.2%	34%	47%	19%

with Donald Trump and Bernie Sanders

Poll source	Date(s) administered	Sample size	Margin of error	Donald Trump (R)	Bernie Sanders (D)	Undecided
Sacred Heart University/Hartford Courant	Mar 24 – Apr 3, 2020	1,000 (A)	± 3.0%	37%	48%	–
Sacred Heart University/Hartford Courant	Feb 24 – Mar 12, 2020	1,000 (A)	± 3.0%	38%	50%	–
Sacred Heart University/Hartford Courant	Dec 16, 2019 – Jan 2, 2020	1,000 (A)	± 3.0%	35%	52%	13%
Sacred Heart University/Hartford Courant	Sep 17 – Oct 2, 2019	1,000 (A)	± 3.2%	35%	51%	14%

with Donald Trump and Elizabeth Warren

Poll source	Date(s) administered	Sample size	Margin of error	Donald Trump (R)	Elizabeth Warren (D)	Undecided
Sacred Heart University/Hartford Courant/Institute for Public Policy	Dec 16, 2019 – Jan 2, 2020	1000 (A)	± 3.0%	36%	49%	16%
Sacred Heart University/Hartford Courant	Sep 17 – Oct 2, 2019	1,000 (A)	± 3.2%	35%	49%	16%

=== Results ===
2020 United States presidential election in Connecticut
Party	Candidate	Votes	%	±%
Democratic	Joe Biden Kamala Harris	1,080,831	59.26%	+4.69%
Republican	Donald Trump Mike Pence	714,717	39.19%	−1.74%
Libertarian	Jo Jorgensen Spike Cohen	20,230	1.11%	−1.85%
Green	Howie Hawkins Angela Walker	7,538	0.41%	−0.98%
Write-in		541	0.03%	+0.01%
Total votes		1,823,857	100.00%	N/A

==== By county ====
County	Joe Biden Democratic		Donald Trump Republican		Various candidates Other parties		Margin		Total votes cast
County	#	%	#	%	#	%	#	%	Total votes cast
Fairfield	297,505	62.90%	169,039	35.74%	6,446	1.36%	128,466	27.16%	472,990
Hartford	283,368	63.06%	159,024	35.39%	6,944	1.55%	124,344	27.67%	449,336
Litchfield	50,164	46.65%	55,601	51.70%	1,779	1.65%	-5,437	-5.05%	107,544
Middlesex	56,848	57.30%	40,665	40.99%	1,690	1.70%	16,183	16.31%	99,203
New Haven	242,630	58.05%	169,893	40.65%	5,460	1.31%	72,737	17.40%	417,983
New London	79,459	56.92%	57,110	40.91%	3,035	2.17%	22,349	16.01%	139,604
Tolland	44,151	54.70%	34,838	43.16%	1,725	2.14%	9,313	11.54%	80,714
Windham	26,706	46.79%	29,141	51.05%	1,235	2.16%	-2,435	-4.26%	57,082
Totals	1,080,831	59.24%	715,291	39.21%	28,309	1.55%	365,389	20.03%	1,824,280

==== By town ====
Town	Joe Biden Democratic		Donald Trump Republican		Jo Jorgensen Libertarian		Howie Hawkins Green		Various candidates Other parties		Margin		Total votes cast
Town	#	%	#	%	#	%	#	%	#	%	#	%	Total votes cast
Andover	1,058	50.60%	998	47.73%	27	1.29%	8	0.38%	0	0.00%	60	2.87%	2,091
Ansonia	4,521	53.70%	3,797	45.10%	63	0.75%	37	0.44%	1	0.01%	724	8.60%	8,419
Ashford	1,330	52.28%	1,160	45.60%	35	1.38%	17	0.67%	2	0.08%	170	6.68%	2,544
Avon	7,299	60.89%	4,469	37.28%	169	1.41%	49	0.41%	1	0.01%	2,830	23.61%	11,987
Barkhamsted	1,154	47.26%	1,228	50.29%	42	1.72%	16	0.66%	2	0.08%	-74	-3.03%	2,442
Beacon Falls	1,543	40.57%	2,191	57.61%	57	1.50%	12	0.32%	0	0.00%	-648	-17.04%	3,803
Berlin	6,008	46.67%	6,687	51.95%	136	1.06%	41	0.32%	1	0.01%	-679	-5.27%	12,873
Bethany	1,912	51.70%	1,718	46.46%	46	1.24%	22	0.59%	0	0.00%	194	5.25%	3,698
Bethel	6,270	56.12%	4,734	42.37%	114	1.02%	51	0.46%	3	0.03%	1,536	13.75%	11,172
Bethlehem	937	39.59%	1,393	58.85%	21	0.89%	15	0.63%	1	0.04%	-456	-19.26%	2,367
Bloomfield	11,007	85.85%	1,698	13.24%	78	0.61%	34	0.27%	4	0.03%	9,309	72.61%	12,821
Bolton	1,727	52.52%	1,482	45.07%	54	1.64%	23	0.70%	2	0.06%	245	7.45%	3,288
Bozrah	703	45.41%	817	52.78%	23	1.49%	5	0.32%	0	0.00%	-114	-7.36%	1,548
Branford	10,562	58.96%	7,098	39.62%	178	0.99%	68	0.38%	7	0.04%	3,464	19.34%	17,913
Bridgeport	33,515	79.44%	8,269	19.60%	200	0.47%	153	0.36%	51	0.12%	25,246	59.84%	42,188
Bridgewater	667	54.10%	549	44.53%	10	0.81%	7	0.57%	0	0.00%	118	9.57%	1,233
Bristol	15,462	51.89%	13,834	46.42%	357	1.20%	121	0.41%	25	0.08%	1,628	5.46%	29,799
Brookfield	5,426	50.21%	5,226	48.36%	111	1.03%	39	0.36%	5	0.05%	200	1.85%	10,807
Brooklyn	1,876	44.43%	2,262	53.58%	70	1.66%	13	0.31%	1	0.02%	-386	-9.14%	4,222
Burlington	3,099	49.72%	3,034	48.68%	76	1.22%	22	0.35%	2	0.03%	65	1.04%	6,233
Canaan	437	66.72%	209	31.91%	6	0.92%	2	0.31%	1	0.15%	228	34.81%	655
Canterbury	1,182	39.24%	1,755	58.27%	58	1.93%	17	0.56%	0	0.00%	-573	-19.02%	3,012
Canton	3,878	58.20%	2,663	39.97%	97	1.46%	23	0.35%	2	0.03%	1,215	18.24%	6,663
Chaplin	598	46.36%	662	51.32%	22	1.71%	8	0.62%	0	0.00%	-64	-4.96%	1,290
Cheshire	9,745	55.95%	7,349	42.19%	237	1.36%	86	0.49%	1	0.01%	2,396	13.76%	17,418
Chester	1,701	65.52%	853	32.86%	29	1.12%	11	0.42%	2	0.08%	848	32.67%	2,596
Clinton	4,368	55.97%	3,312	42.44%	99	1.27%	25	0.32%	0	0.00%	1,056	13.53%	7,804
Colchester	5,216	53.82%	4,243	43.78%	178	1.84%	54	0.56%	0	0.00%	973	10.04%	9,691
Colebrook	403	40.79%	563	56.98%	19	1.92%	3	0.30%	0	0.00%	-160	-16.19%	988
Columbia	1,888	52.91%	1,600	44.84%	61	1.71%	18	0.50%	1	0.03%	288	8.07%	3,568
Cornwall	760	73.64%	250	24.22%	9	0.87%	13	1.26%	0	0.00%	510	49.42%	1,032
Coventry	4,011	51.61%	3,545	45.61%	154	1.98%	49	0.63%	13	0.17%	466	6.00%	7,772
Cromwell	4,872	55.47%	3,749	42.68%	110	1.25%	42	0.48%	10	0.11%	1,123	12.79%	8,783
Danbury	18,869	58.93%	12,788	39.94%	261	0.82%	100	0.31%	3	0.01%	6,081	18.99%	32,021
Darien	7,876	60.50%	4,921	37.80%	174	1.34%	47	0.36%	0	0.00%	2,955	22.70%	13,018
Deep River	1,785	61.51%	1,076	37.08%	29	1.00%	12	0.41%	0	0.00%	709	24.43%	2,902
Derby	2,963	51.28%	2,749	47.58%	49	0.85%	17	0.29%	0	0.00%	214	3.70%	5,778
Durham	2,363	49.41%	2,330	48.72%	65	1.36%	22	0.46%	2	0.04%	33	0.69%	4,782
East Granby	1,789	54.81%	1,405	43.05%	55	1.69%	15	0.46%	0	0.00%	384	11.76%	3,264
East Haddam	2,980	51.16%	2,731	46.88%	88	1.51%	25	0.43%	1	0.02%	249	4.27%	5,825
East Hampton	4,051	50.71%	3,746	46.90%	139	1.74%	48	0.60%	4	0.05%	305	3.82%	7,988
East Hartford	14,787	71.76%	5,524	26.81%	227	1.10%	67	0.33%	2	0.01%	9,263	44.95%	20,607
East Haven	6,757	46.60%	7,572	52.22%	111	0.77%	58	0.40%	3	0.02%	-815	-5.62%	14,501
East Lyme	7,290	62.01%	4,285	36.45%	145	1.23%	36	0.31%	0	0.00%	3,005	25.56%	11,756
East Windsor	3,008	53.22%	2,541	44.96%	82	1.45%	20	0.35%	1	0.02%	467	8.26%	5,652
Eastford	464	43.49%	572	53.61%	23	2.16%	8	0.75%	0	0.00%	-108	-10.12%	1,067
Easton	2,777	55.29%	2,178	43.36%	46	0.92%	19	0.38%	3	0.06%	599	11.93%	5,023
Ellington	4,787	50.44%	4,515	47.57%	142	1.50%	36	0.38%	11	0.12%	272	2.87%	9,491
Enfield	11,263	53.82%	9,298	44.43%	272	1.30%	85	0.41%	11	0.05%	1,965	9.39%	20,929
Essex	3,011	63.86%	1,635	34.68%	44	0.93%	23	0.49%	2	0.04%	1,376	29.18%	4,715
Fairfield	22,861	64.55%	12,052	34.03%	377	1.06%	116	0.33%	8	0.02%	10,809	30.52%	35,414
Farmington	9,616	59.96%	6,160	38.41%	202	1.26%	56	0.35%	3	0.02%	3,456	21.55%	16,037
Franklin	553	43.85%	674	53.45%	28	2.22%	5	0.40%	1	0.08%	-121	-9.60%	1,261
Glastonbury	13,990	62.53%	7,998	35.75%	290	1.30%	96	0.43%	0	0.00%	5,992	26.78%	22,374
Goshen	902	42.95%	1,161	55.29%	32	1.52%	5	0.24%	0	0.00%	-259	-12.33%	2,100
Granby	4,029	54.65%	3,166	42.94%	138	1.87%	35	0.47%	5	0.07%	863	11.70%	7,373
Greenwich	22,243	61.59%	13,269	36.74%	488	1.35%	94	0.26%	18	0.05%	8,974	24.85%	36,112
Griswold	2,565	42.89%	3,257	54.46%	116	1.94%	42	0.70%	1	0.02%	-692	-11.57%	5,981
Groton	10,699	61.53%	6,272	36.07%	319	1.83%	92	0.53%	7	0.04%	4,427	25.46%	17,389
Guilford	9,616	64.68%	5,050	33.97%	135	0.91%	63	0.42%	3	0.02%	4,566	30.71%	14,867
Haddam	2,728	49.49%	2,693	48.86%	67	1.22%	23	0.42%	1	0.02%	35	0.63%	5,512
Hamden	21,652	74.40%	7,139	24.53%	174	0.60%	139	0.48%	0	0.00%	14,513	49.87%	29,104
Hampton	572	50.22%	551	48.38%	9	0.79%	6	0.53%	1	0.09%	21	1.84%	1,139
Hartford	28,301	86.58%	4,116	12.59%	135	0.41%	134	0.41%	1	0.00%	24,185	73.99%	32,687
Hartland	457	35.37%	818	63.31%	11	0.85%	5	0.39%	1	0.08%	-361	-27.94%	1,292
Harwinton	1,397	37.75%	2,229	60.23%	53	1.43%	21	0.57%	1	0.03%	-832	-22.48%	3,701
Hebron	3,388	54.07%	2,731	43.58%	121	1.93%	26	0.41%	0	0.00%	657	10.49%	6,266
Kent	1,277	68.47%	568	30.46%	12	0.64%	7	0.38%	1	0.05%	709	38.02%	1,865
Killingly	3,402	41.07%	4,678	56.48%	147	1.77%	54	0.65%	2	0.02%	-1,276	-15.41%	8,283
Killingworth	2,343	53.41%	1,979	45.11%	44	1.00%	20	0.46%	1	0.02%	364	8.30%	4,387
Lebanon	2,052	46.24%	2,268	51.10%	84	1.89%	34	0.77%	0	0.00%	-216	-4.87%	4,438
Ledyard	4,534	53.80%	3,664	43.48%	177	2.10%	50	0.59%	2	0.02%	870	10.32%	8,427
Lisbon	1,099	44.14%	1,331	53.45%	44	1.77%	16	0.64%	0	0.00%	-232	-9.32%	2,490
Litchfield	2,673	50.04%	2,555	47.83%	74	1.39%	39	0.73%	1	0.02%	118	2.21%	5,342
Lyme	1,165	65.74%	576	32.51%	27	1.52%	4	0.23%	0	0.00%	589	33.24%	1,772
Madison	7,625	61.31%	4,638	37.29%	118	0.95%	50	0.40%	6	0.05%	2,987	24.02%	12,437
Manchester	19,455	68.34%	8,530	29.97%	354	1.24%	110	0.39%	17	0.06%	10,925	38.38%	28,466
Mansfield	5,753	75.18%	1,727	22.57%	124	1.62%	46	0.60%	2	0.03%	4,026	52.61%	7,652
Marlborough	2,119	52.17%	1,861	45.81%	68	1.67%	11	0.27%	3	0.07%	258	6.35%	4,062
Meriden	14,955	59.05%	9,981	39.41%	278	1.10%	102	0.40%	10	0.04%	4,974	19.64%	25,326
Middlebury	2,259	44.49%	2,741	53.98%	58	1.14%	16	0.32%	4	0.08%	-482	-9.49%	5,078
Middlefield	1,442	50.54%	1,356	47.53%	39	1.37%	15	0.53%	1	0.04%	86	3.01%	2,853
Middletown	15,508	65.97%	7,611	32.37%	273	1.16%	113	0.48%	4	0.02%	7,897	33.59%	23,509
Milford	17,626	54.97%	13,997	43.66%	309	0.96%	120	0.37%	10	0.03%	3,629	11.32%	32,062
Monroe	5,838	48.64%	5,989	49.90%	128	1.07%	47	0.39%	0	0.00%	-151	-1.26%	12,002
Montville	4,406	49.66%	4,242	47.81%	173	1.95%	50	0.56%	2	0.02%	164	1.85%	8,873
Morris	653	41.83%	874	55.99%	20	1.28%	12	0.77%	2	0.13%	-221	-14.16%	1,561
Naugatuck	6,923	46.45%	7,740	51.93%	161	1.08%	79	0.53%	1	0.01%	-817	-5.48%	14,904
New Britain	16,031	66.60%	7,724	32.09%	211	0.88%	105	0.44%	0	0.00%	8,307	34.51%	24,071
New Canaan	7,298	59.02%	4,855	39.26%	169	1.37%	37	0.30%	6	0.05%	2,443	19.76%	12,365
New Fairfield	4,101	47.92%	4,343	50.75%	95	1.11%	16	0.19%	3	0.04%	-242	-2.83%	8,558
New Hartford	2,089	45.64%	2,382	52.04%	82	1.79%	22	0.48%	2	0.04%	-293	-6.40%	4,577
New Haven	35,521	84.37%	6,146	14.60%	201	0.48%	208	0.49%	26	0.06%	29,375	69.77%	42,102
New London	6,912	75.76%	2,045	22.42%	99	1.09%	67	0.73%	0	0.00%	4,867	53.35%	9,123
New Milford	8,004	50.87%	7,493	47.62%	161	1.02%	76	0.48%	0	0.00%	511	3.25%	15,734
Newington	10,031	57.80%	7,074	40.76%	179	1.03%	68	0.39%	3	0.02%	2,957	17.04%	17,355
Newtown	9,695	56.14%	7,292	42.23%	200	1.16%	69	0.40%	13	0.08%	2,403	13.92%	17,269
Norfolk	659	62.17%	381	35.94%	17	1.60%	3	0.28%	0	0.00%	278	26.23%	1,060
North Branford	3,718	43.08%	4,786	55.45%	88	1.02%	38	0.44%	1	0.01%	-1,068	-12.37%	8,631
North Canaan	862	50.56%	812	47.62%	27	1.58%	4	0.23%	0	0.00%	50	2.93%	1,705
North Haven	7,389	47.85%	7,879	51.03%	113	0.73%	56	0.36%	4	0.03%	-490	-3.17%	15,441
North Stonington	1,601	47.44%	1,710	50.67%	49	1.45%	15	0.44%	0	0.00%	-109	-3.23%	3,375
Norwalk	29,382	67.98%	13,311	30.80%	355	0.82%	166	0.38%	5	0.01%	16,071	37.19%	43,219
Norwich	9,306	60.86%	5,643	36.91%	245	1.60%	95	0.62%	1	0.01%	3,663	23.96%	15,290
Old Lyme	3,226	59.60%	2,099	38.78%	68	1.26%	20	0.37%	0	0.00%	1,127	20.82%	5,413
Old Saybrook	4,253	57.92%	2,995	40.79%	67	0.91%	28	0.38%	0	0.00%	1,258	17.13%	7,343
Orange	4,816	52.05%	4,317	46.66%	78	0.84%	38	0.41%	4	0.04%	499	5.39%	9,253
Oxford	3,269	38.40%	5,118	60.11%	107	1.26%	17	0.20%	3	0.04%	-1,849	-21.72%	8,514
Plainfield	2,854	40.25%	4,080	57.54%	124	1.75%	33	0.47%	0	0.00%	-1,226	-17.29%	7,091
Plainville	4,670	48.41%	4,811	49.87%	122	1.26%	44	0.46%	0	0.00%	-141	-1.46%	9,647
Plymouth	2,477	37.57%	3,984	60.43%	99	1.50%	33	0.50%	0	0.00%	-1,507	-22.86%	6,593
Pomfret	1,357	53.76%	1,113	44.10%	39	1.55%	13	0.52%	2	0.08%	244	9.67%	2,524
Portland	3,155	53.58%	2,641	44.85%	72	1.22%	19	0.32%	1	0.02%	514	8.73%	5,888
Preston	1,270	44.28%	1,529	53.31%	50	1.74%	19	0.66%	0	0.00%	-259	-9.03%	2,868
Prospect	2,110	34.53%	3,935	64.39%	47	0.77%	18	0.29%	1	0.02%	-1,825	-29.86%	6,111
Putnam	2,063	47.43%	2,193	50.41%	77	1.77%	16	0.37%	1	0.02%	-130	-2.99%	4,350
Redding	3,829	64.08%	2,052	34.34%	65	1.09%	24	0.40%	5	0.08%	1,777	29.74%	5,975
Ridgefield	10,278	63.27%	5,689	35.02%	213	1.31%	55	0.34%	10	0.06%	4,589	28.25%	16,245
Rocky Hill	6,115	55.90%	4,670	42.69%	112	1.02%	40	0.37%	3	0.03%	1,445	13.21%	10,940
Roxbury	937	57.77%	660	40.69%	18	1.11%	7	0.43%	0	0.00%	277	17.08%	1,622
Salem	1,285	48.99%	1,291	49.22%	28	1.07%	15	0.57%	4	0.15%	-6	-0.23%	2,623
Salisbury	2,023	79.18%	502	19.65%	17	0.67%	13	0.51%	0	0.00%	1,521	59.53%	2,555
Scotland	406	41.86%	537	55.36%	23	2.37%	4	0.41%	0	0.00%	-131	-13.51%	970
Seymour	4,011	42.71%	5,242	55.81%	96	1.02%	43	0.46%	0	0.00%	-1,231	-13.11%	9,392
Sharon	1,019	65.53%	510	32.80%	17	1.09%	9	0.58%	0	0.00%	509	32.73%	1,555
Shelton	10,837	45.36%	12,747	53.35%	206	0.86%	92	0.39%	10	0.04%	-1,910	-7.99%	23,892
Sherman	1,234	52.83%	1,076	46.06%	22	0.94%	4	0.17%	0	0.00%	158	6.76%	2,336
Simsbury	10,296	63.66%	5,575	34.47%	225	1.39%	71	0.44%	7	0.04%	4,721	29.19%	16,174
Somers	2,445	42.66%	3,204	55.91%	54	0.94%	17	0.30%	11	0.19%	-759	-13.24%	5,731
South Windsor	9,596	61.82%	5,630	36.27%	211	1.36%	81	0.52%	5	0.03%	3,966	25.55%	15,523
Southbury	6,570	50.58%	6,260	48.19%	119	0.92%	41	0.32%	0	0.00%	310	2.39%	12,990
Southington	12,855	48.11%	13,473	50.43%	285	1.07%	101	0.38%	4	0.01%	-618	-2.31%	26,718
Sprague	641	41.17%	882	56.65%	26	1.67%	8	0.51%	0	0.00%	-241	-15.48%	1,557
Stafford	2,809	43.74%	3,461	53.89%	117	1.82%	33	0.51%	2	0.03%	-652	-10.15%	6,422
Stamford	40,437	68.06%	18,242	30.70%	496	0.83%	224	0.38%	13	0.02%	22,195	37.36%	59,412
Sterling	639	33.49%	1,229	64.41%	25	1.31%	14	0.73%	1	0.05%	-590	-30.92%	1,908
Stonington	7,453	62.69%	4,240	35.66%	155	1.30%	40	0.34%	1	0.01%	3,213	27.02%	11,889
Stratford	17,363	61.58%	10,516	37.30%	183	0.65%	132	0.47%	0	0.00%	6,847	24.29%	28,194
Suffield	4,363	50.23%	4,155	47.84%	140	1.61%	26	0.30%	2	0.02%	208	2.39%	8,686
Thomaston	1,528	34.93%	2,768	63.28%	65	1.49%	13	0.30%	0	0.00%	-1,240	-28.35%	4,374
Thompson	2,050	39.77%	3,005	58.29%	80	1.55%	20	0.39%	0	0.00%	-955	-18.53%	5,155
Tolland	5,103	55.13%	3,975	42.94%	134	1.45%	43	0.46%	2	0.02%	1,128	12.19%	9,257
Torrington	7,283	43.29%	9,220	54.80%	235	1.40%	83	0.49%	3	0.02%	-1,937	-11.51%	16,824
Trumbull	11,919	55.68%	9,175	42.86%	231	1.08%	76	0.36%	7	0.03%	2,744	12.82%	21,408
Union	249	43.61%	307	53.77%	12	2.10%	3	0.53%	0	0.00%	-58	-10.16%	571
Vernon	9,259	60.12%	5,848	37.97%	216	1.40%	76	0.49%	1	0.01%	3,411	22.15%	15,400
Voluntown	566	37.14%	918	60.24%	32	2.10%	8	0.52%	0	0.00%	-352	-23.10%	1,524
Wallingford	13,560	52.59%	11,831	45.88%	302	1.17%	86	0.33%	6	0.02%	1,729	6.71%	25,785
Warren	465	49.21%	470	49.74%	9	0.95%	1	0.11%	0	0.00%	-5	-0.53%	945
Washington	1,461	64.42%	770	33.95%	25	1.10%	12	0.53%	0	0.00%	691	30.47%	2,268
Waterbury	21,573	59.75%	14,157	39.21%	249	0.69%	118	0.33%	10	0.03%	7,416	20.54%	36,107
Waterford	6,917	56.16%	5,124	41.60%	190	1.54%	82	0.67%	3	0.02%	1,793	14.56%	12,316
Watertown	4,612	36.16%	7,976	62.54%	128	1.00%	38	0.30%	0	0.00%	-3,364	-26.38%	12,754
West Hartford	27,298	75.22%	8,451	23.29%	379	1.04%	143	0.39%	20	0.06%	18,847	51.93%	36,291
West Haven	14,245	63.02%	8,126	35.95%	145	0.64%	89	0.39%	0	0.00%	6,119	27.07%	22,605
Westbrook	2,288	53.07%	1,958	45.42%	45	1.04%	18	0.42%	2	0.05%	330	7.65%	4,311
Weston	4,733	72.50%	1,680	25.74%	84	1.29%	25	0.38%	6	0.09%	3,053	46.77%	6,528
Westport	13,048	74.46%	4,222	24.09%	206	1.18%	46	0.26%	1	0.01%	8,826	50.37%	17,523
Wethersfield	9,612	59.05%	6,413	39.40%	172	1.06%	77	0.47%	3	0.02%	3,199	19.65%	16,277
Willington	1,674	52.25%	1,445	45.10%	61	1.90%	20	0.62%	4	0.12%	229	7.15%	3,204
Wilton	7,676	65.52%	3,819	32.60%	169	1.44%	49	0.42%	2	0.02%	3,857	32.92%	11,715
Winchester	2,304	44.89%	2,799	54.53%	13	0.25%	17	0.33%	0	0.00%	-495	-9.64%	5,133
Windham	5,365	64.27%	2,824	33.83%	95	1.14%	61	0.73%	3	0.04%	2,541	30.44%	8,348
Windsor	13,183	75.27%	4,090	23.35%	175	1.00%	61	0.35%	5	0.03%	9,093	51.92%	17,514
Windsor Locks	3,751	53.43%	3,156	44.95%	81	1.15%	32	0.46%	1	0.01%	595	8.47%	7,021
Wolcott	3,333	33.32%	6,519	65.18%	105	1.05%	41	0.41%	4	0.04%	-3,186	-31.85%	10,002
Woodbridge	3,856	67.15%	1,817	31.64%	37	0.64%	31	0.54%	1	0.02%	2,039	35.51%	5,742
Woodbury	3,181	48.50%	3,295	50.24%	69	1.05%	14	0.21%	0	0.00%	-114	-1.74%	6,559
Woodstock	2,548	49.20%	2,520	48.66%	87	1.68%	23	0.44%	1	0.02%	28	0.54%	5,179
Totals	1,080,831	59.26%	714,717	39.19%	20,230	1.11%	7,538	0.41%	540	0.03%	366,114	20.07%	1,823,856

Council of government results

==== By congressional district ====
Biden won all five congressional districts.

District	Trump	Biden	Representative
1st	35%	63%	John Larson
2nd	44%	54%	Joe Courtney
3rd	39%	60%	Rosa DeLauro
4th	34%	64%	Jim Himes
5th	44%	55%	Jahana Hayes

== Analysis ==
Biden won the state by 20 points, a notable improvement from Hillary Clinton's 13-point win in the state in 2016. He fared especially well in Fairfield County, an ancestrally Republican area, as well as the Hartford suburbs. Biden also came within 5 points of flipping traditionally Republican Litchfield County, which had previously voted Democratic in 2008; and 4.2 points of flipping traditionally Democratic Windham County, which had previously voted Democratic in 2012.

Per exit polls by the Associated Press, Biden's strength in Connecticut came from college-educated and high income voters. Biden won a combined 70% in large cities and 62% in suburban areas, a key demographic in a heavily suburban state. Biden built on Hillary Clinton's gains in suburban Fairfield County, even flipping three towns: Trumbull, Brookfield, and Sherman. Trumbull and Brookfield last voted Democratic in 1964, while Sherman last voted Democratic in 2008.

Biden is the first presidential nominee ever to exceed 1 million votes in the state. Additionally, his total is currently the highest that any candidate in any race in Connecticut has received, surpassing the previous record of 1,008,714 that Richard Blumenthal received in his 2016 Senate race. At the same time, Biden became the first Democrat to win the White House without carrying Windham County since Woodrow Wilson in 1916. He also become the first Democrat to win without the town of Griswold since 1888, the first to win without the town of Sprague since 1892, the first to win without the towns of Killingly, Plainfield, Putnam, and Stafford since 1916, the first to win without Lisbon and Plainville since 1948, and the first to win without the town of Salem since 1960.

== See also ==
- United States presidential elections in Connecticut
- Presidency of Joe Biden
- 2020 United States presidential election
- 2020 Democratic Party presidential primaries
- 2020 Republican Party presidential primaries
- 2020 United States elections
