= 2012 Connecticut Republican presidential primary =

- April 24, 2012

25 pledged delegates to the 2012 Republican National Convention
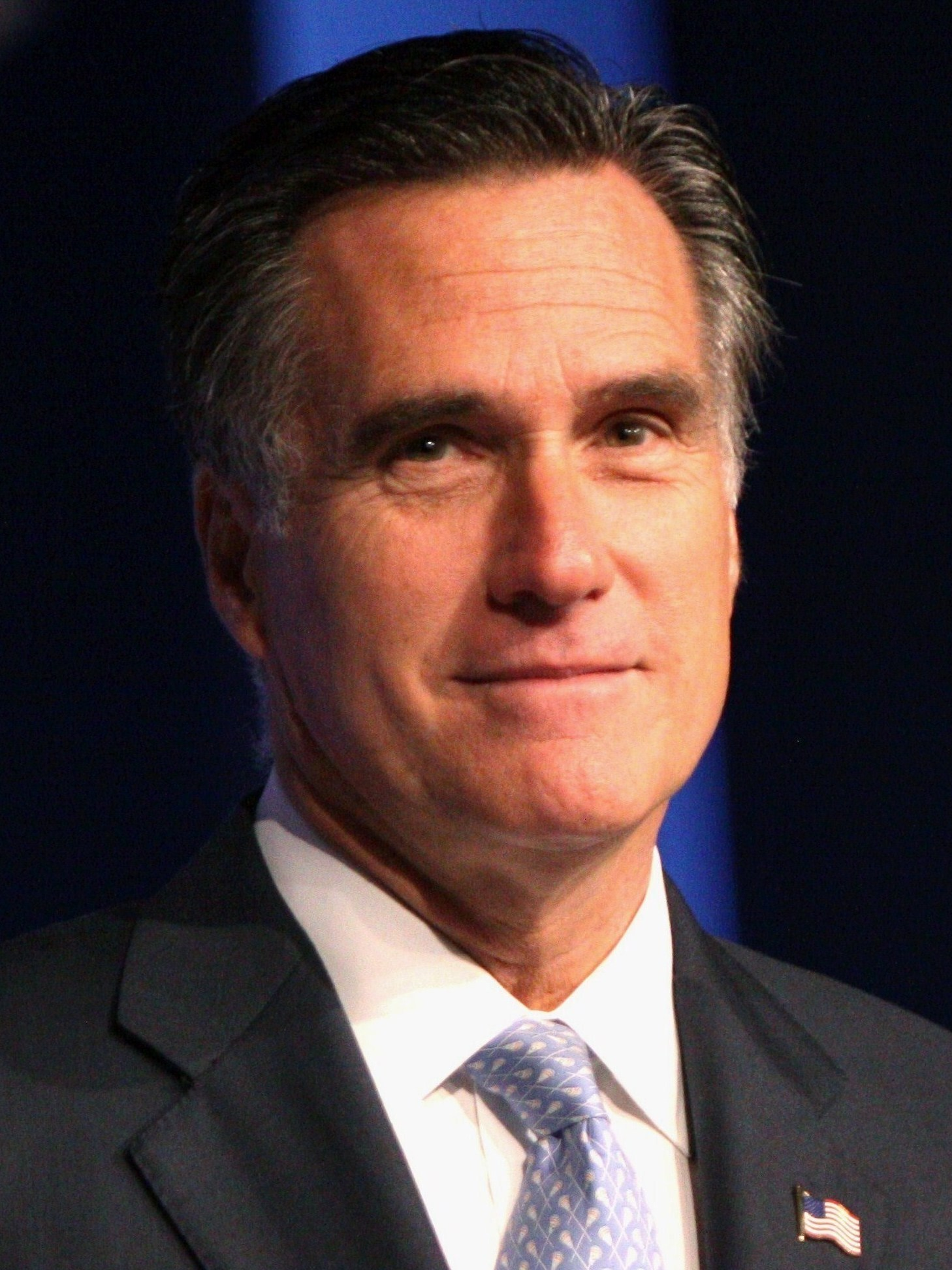

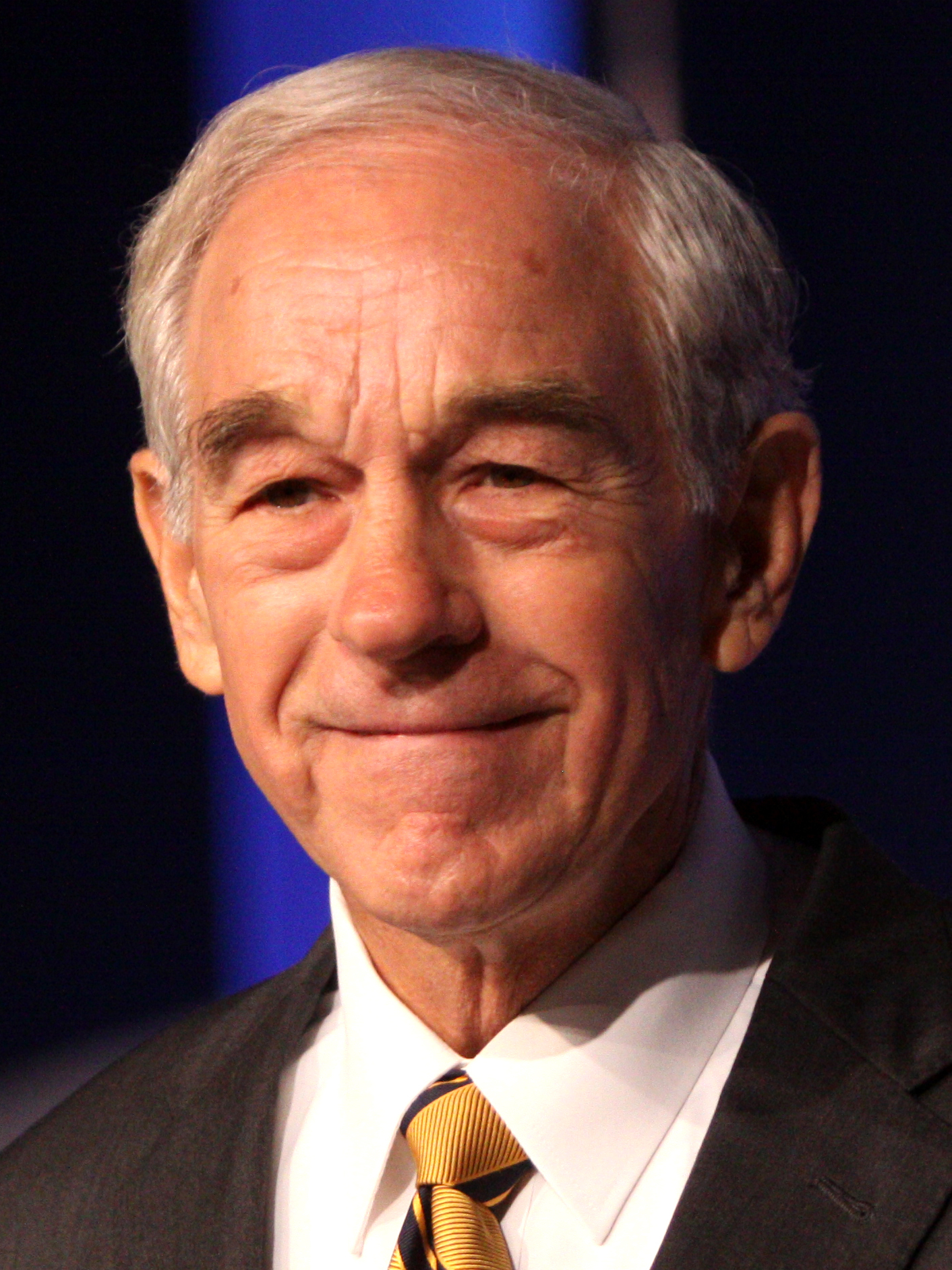

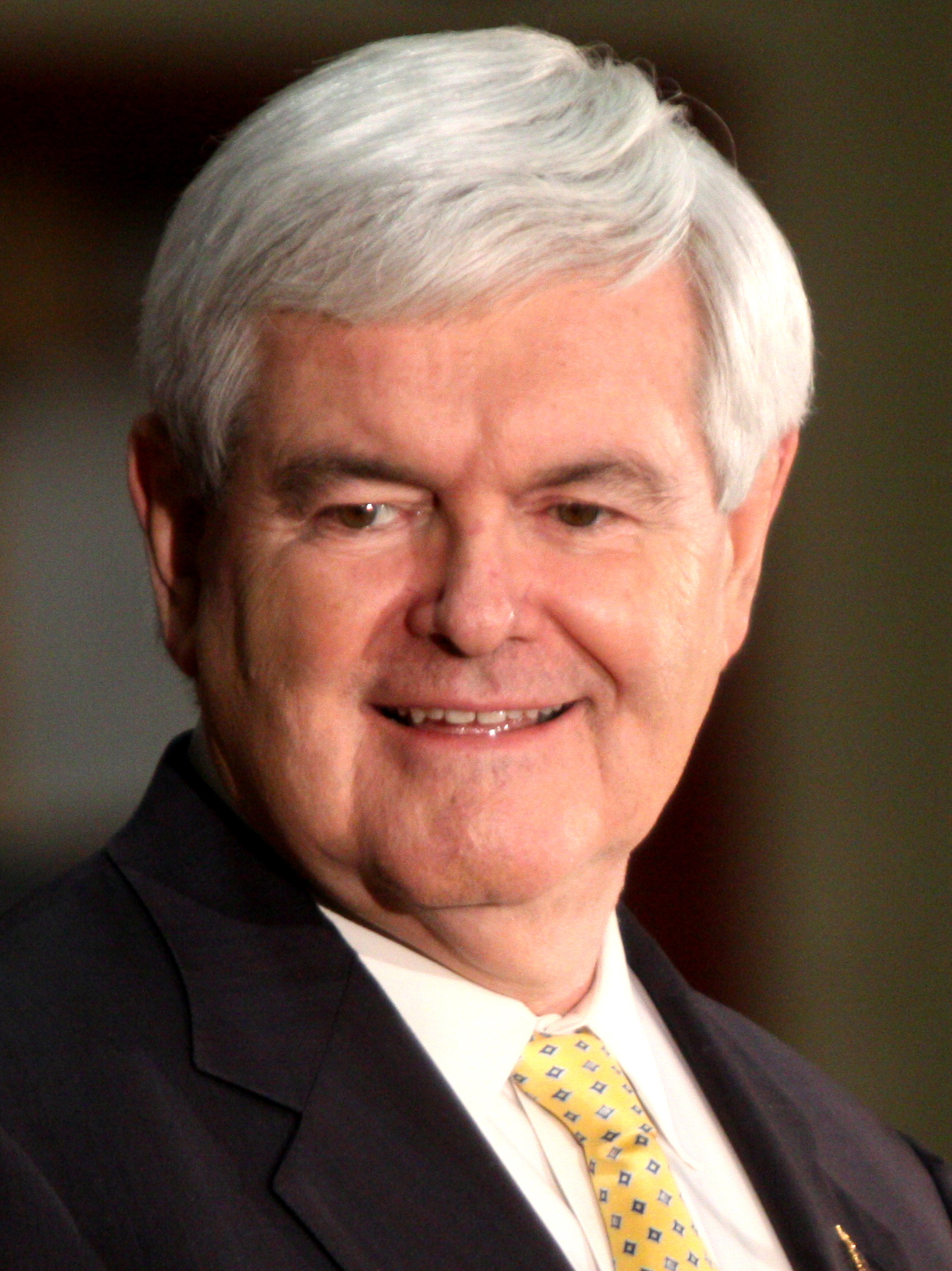

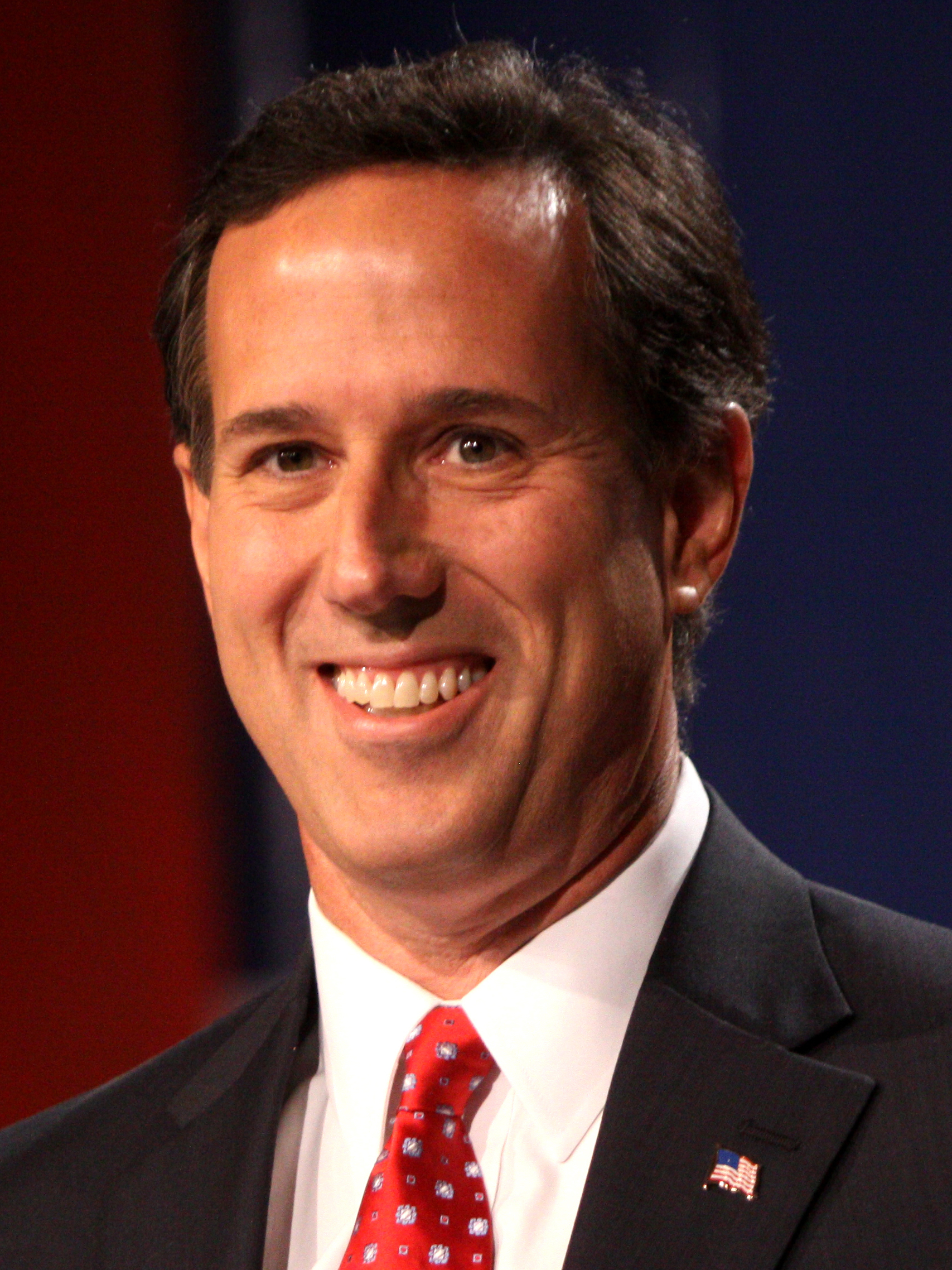
Candidate	Mitt Romney	Ron Paul
Home state	Massachusetts	Texas
Delegate count	25	0
Popular vote	40,171	8,032
Percentage	67.43%	13.48%
Candidate	Newt Gingrich	Rick Santorum (withdrawn)
Home state	Georgia	Pennsylvania
Delegate count	0	0
Popular vote	6,135	4,072
Percentage	10.30%	6.83%
- Primary results by county Mitt Romney

The 2012 Connecticut Republican presidential primary took place on April 24, 2012. It was a closed primary, open only to Republican electors. 25 of the state's 28 delegates to the 2012 Republican National Convention were decided by the primary outcome, with the other 3 being superdelegates: the state party chairman and the state's two Republican National Committee representatives.

Mitt Romney won the primary by a wide margin, garnering two-thirds of the vote. Only 14.4% of active registered Republicans participated in the primary, the lowest turnout since the primary format was put in place in the state in 1980.

== Process ==
After switching from proportional distribution of delegates to a winner-take-all system in 1996, the Connecticut Republican Party voted in September 2011 to award delegates by a hybrid winner-take-all and proportional distribution process beginning with the 2012 primary. Of the 25 regular delegates at stake in the primary, the party called for three delegates to be awarded to the winner of each of the state's five congressional districts on a winner-take-all basis for a total of 15 delegates. The remaining 10 would be distributed proportionally based on the statewide vote total among candidates receiving at least 20% support unless a candidate won a majority of the statewide vote, in which case the candidate would receive all 10 of these delegates.

== Opinion polling ==
Poll source	Date	1st	2nd	3rd	Other
Quinnipiac; Margin of error: ±4.7% Sample size: 429	Mar. 14–19, 2012	Mitt Romney; 42%	Rick Santorum; 19%	Newt Gingrich; 13%	Ron Paul 9%, Won't vote 3%, Don't know/No answer 14%
Public Policy Polling; Margin of error: ±4.9% Sample size: 400	Sep. 22–25, 2011	Mitt Romney; 25%	Rick Perry; 18%	Herman Cain; 10%	Newt Gingrich 10%, Ron Paul 10%, Michele Bachmann 8%, Jon Huntsman 3%, Rick Santorum 3%, Gary Johnson 1%, someone else/not sure 12%
Public Policy Polling; Margin of error: ±4.9% Sample size: 400	Sep. 22–25, 2011	Mitt Romney; 45%	Rick Perry; 36%	–	not sure 19%
Quinnipiac; Margin of error: ±5.4% Sample size: 332	Sep. 8–13, 2011	Mitt Romney; 37%	Rick Perry; 19%	Michele Bachmann; 8%	Sarah Palin 4%, Herman Cain 3%, Newt Gingrich 3%, Ron Paul 3%, Jon Huntsman 2%, Rick Santorum 1%, Thaddeus McCotter 0%, someone else/undecided 20%
Public Policy Polling; Margin of error: ±7.3% Sample size: 180	Oct. 27–29, 2010	Mitt Romney; 28%	Mike Huckabee; 15%	Newt Gingrich; 14%	Sarah Palin 11%, Tim Pawlenty 5%, Mike Pence 5%, Mitch Daniels 4%, John Thune 2%, someone else/undecided 18%

== Results ==
With Romney's primary day wins in all five congressional districts and a majority of the statewide vote, he was able to claim all 25 of the delegates at stake.

2012 Connecticut Republican presidential primary
Candidate	Votes	Percentage	Delegates
Mitt Romney	40,171	67.43%	25
Ron Paul	8,032	13.48%	0
Newt Gingrich	6,135	10.30%	0
Rick Santorum	4,072	6.83%	0
Uncommitted	1,168	1.96%	0
Unprojected delegates:			0
Total:	59,578	100%	25

Official source reports a turnout of 59,639, with the difference from 59,578 likely due to blank ballots.

Key:	Suspended campaign prior to contest
