= Middlesex County, Connecticut =

County in Connecticut, United States

- County
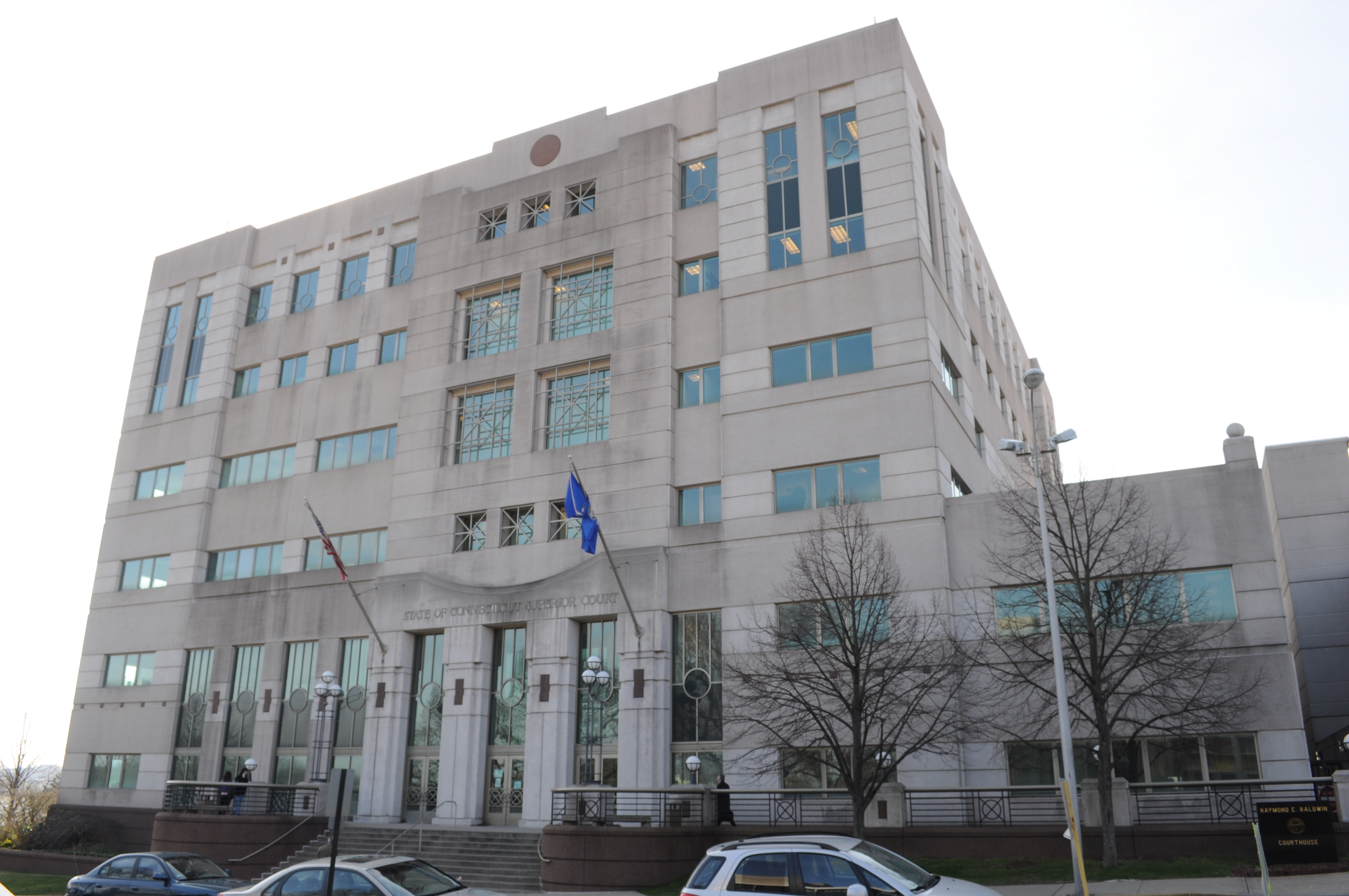
- Raymond E Baldwin Courthouse

- Location within the U.S. state of Connecticut
- Interactive map of Middlesex County, Connecticut
- Coordinates: 41°26′N 72°31′W
- Country: United States
- State: Connecticut
- Founded: May, 1785
- Named for: Middlesex, England
- Seat: none (since 1960); Middletown (before 1960)
- Largest city: Middletown

Area
  - Total: 439 sq mi (1,140 km^{2})
  - Land: 369 sq mi (960 km^{2})
  - Water: 70 sq mi (180 km^{2}) 15.9%

Population (2020)
  - Total: 164,245 ▼
  - Density: 370/sq mi (140/km^{2})
- Time zone: UTC−5 (Eastern)
  - Summer (DST): UTC−4 (EDT)
- Congressional districts: 1st, 2nd, 3rd

Middlesex County is a county in the south-central part of the U.S. state of Connecticut. As of the 2020 census, its population was 164,245. The county was created in May 1785 from portions of Hartford and New London Counties.

Middlesex County is included in the Hartford-East Hartford-Middletown metropolitan statistical area known as Greater Hartford.

All eight of Connecticut's counties have no county government and no county seat, so towns are responsible for all local government activities, including local police, fire and rescue, snow removal, and schools. In a few cases, neighboring towns can share certain resources, e.g. water or gas. On June 6, 2022, the U.S. Census Bureau formally recognized Connecticut's nine councils of governments as county equivalents instead of the state's counties. Connecticut's county governments were disbanded in 1960, and the councils of governments took over some of the local governmental functions. Those historical counties continue to exist in name only and are no longer considered for statistical purposes.

== Government ==
Middletown was the county seat of Middlesex County from its creation in 1785 until the elimination of county government in 1960. No government is in Middlesex County other than the Middlesex County Judicial District. All county functions other than courts and county sheriff's departments were discontinued in 1960, and again in 2000 when the county sheriff's departments were reorganized as the Connecticut Judicial Marshal, due to political corruption in the county sheriff's departments. Joseph E. Bibisi was the last person to serve as high sheriff of Middlesex County.

== Geography ==
The county has a total area of 439 square miles (1,140 km^{2}), of which 70 square miles (180 km^{2}) (15.9%) are covered by water. It is the smallest county in Connecticut by land area and second-smallest by total area.

The terrain trends from mostly level along the Connecticut River and Atlantic Coast to gently rolling uplands away from them. The highest elevation is close to a triangulation station in Meshomasic State Forest at 916 feet (279 m) above sea level; the lowest point is sea level. Middlesex County is also the home of Wadsworth Falls.

=== Adjacent counties ===
- Hartford County (north)
- New London County (east)
- New Haven County (west)
- Suffolk County, New York (south)

=== National protected areas ===
- Silvio O. Conte National Wildlife Refuge (part)
- Stewart B. McKinney National Wildlife Refuge (part)

== Demographics ==
Historical population
| Census | Pop. | Note | %± |
|---|---|---|---|
| 1790 | 18,828 | | — |
| 1800 | 19,874 | | 5.6% |
| 1810 | 20,723 | | 4.3% |
| 1820 | 22,405 | | 8.1% |
| 1830 | 24,844 | | 10.9% |
| 1840 | 24,879 | | 0.1% |
| 1850 | 27,216 | | 9.4% |
| 1860 | 30,859 | | 13.4% |
| 1870 | 36,099 | | 17.0% |
| 1880 | 35,589 | | −1.4% |
| 1890 | 39,524 | | 11.1% |
| 1900 | 41,760 | | 5.7% |
| 1910 | 45,637 | | 9.3% |
| 1920 | 47,550 | | 4.2% |
| 1930 | 51,388 | | 8.1% |
| 1940 | 55,999 | | 9.0% |
| 1950 | 67,332 | | 20.2% |
| 1960 | 88,865 | | 32.0% |
| 1970 | 114,816 | | 29.2% |
| 1980 | 129,017 | | 12.4% |
| 1990 | 143,196 | | 11.0% |
| 2000 | 155,071 | | 8.3% |
| 2010 | 165,676 | | 6.8% |
| 2020 | 164,245 | | −0.9% |
U.S. Decennial Census; 1790–1960 1900–1990; 1990–2000 2010–2018

=== 2020 census ===
As of the 2020 census, the county had a population of 164,245. Of the residents, 17.2% were under 18 and 21.4% were 65 or older; the median age was 46.4 years. The female/male ratio was 1:0.949 overall and 1:0.929 for those 18 and over. About 70.8% of the residents lived in urban areas and 29.2% lived in rural areas.

The racial makeup of the county was 82.0% White, 5.2% Black or African American, 0.2% American Indian and Alaska Native, 3.0% Asian, 0.0% Native Hawaiian and Pacific Islander, 2.6% from some other race, and 6.9% from two or more races. Hispanic or Latino residents of any race comprised 7.3% of the population.

Of the 68,685 households in the county, 24.1% had children under 18 living with them, 26.4% had a female householder with no spouse or partner present, 30.2% were made up of individuals, and 13.4% had someone living alone who was 65 or older.

The county had 76,289 housing units, of which 10.0% were vacant. Among occupied housing units, 73.0% were owner-occupied and 27.0% were renter-occupied. The homeowner vacancy rate was 1.3% and the rental vacancy rate was 6.2%.

=== Racial and ethnic composition ===
Middlesex County, Connecticut – Racial and ethnic composition Note: the US Census treats Hispanic/Latino as an ethnic category. This table excludes Latinos from the racial categories and assigns them to a separate category. Hispanics/Latinos may be of any race.
| Race / Ethnicity (NH = Non-Hispanic) | Pop 1980 | Pop 1990 | Pop 2000 | Pop 2010 | Pop 2020 | % 1980 | % 1990 | % 2000 | % 2010 | % 2020 |
|---|---|---|---|---|---|---|---|---|---|---|
| White alone (NH) | 121,567 | 132,667 | 138,979 | 143,144 | 131,954 | 94.23% | 92.65% | 89.62% | 86.40% | 80.34% |
| Black or African American alone (NH) | 4,711 | 5,846 | 6,588 | 7,256 | 8,001 | 3.65% | 4.08% | 4.25% | 4.38% | 4.87% |
| Native American or Alaska Native alone (NH) | 184 | 221 | 229 | 210 | 214 | 0.14% | 0.15% | 0.15% | 0.13% | 0.13% |
| Asian alone (NH) | 519 | 1,510 | 2,392 | 4,207 | 4,923 | 0.40% | 1.05% | 1.54% | 2.54% | 3.00% |
| Native Hawaiian or Pacific Islander alone (NH) | x | x | 46 | 53 | 43 | x | x | 0.03% | 0.03% | 0.03% |
| Other race alone (NH) | 240 | 71 | 146 | 290 | 744 | 0.19% | 0.05% | 0.09% | 0.18% | 0.45% |
| Multiracial (NH) | x | x | 2,042 | 2,682 | 6,438 | x | x | 1.32% | 1.62% | 3.92% |
| Hispanic or Latino (any race) | 1,796 | 2,881 | 4,649 | 7,834 | 11,928 | 1.39% | 2.01% | 3.00% | 4.73% | 7.26% |
| Total | 129,017 | 143,196 | 155,071 | 165,676 | 164,245 | 100.00% | 100.00% | 100.00% | 100.00% | 100.00% |

=== 2010 census ===
As of the 2010 United States census, 165,676 people, 67,202 households, and 43,743 families were living in the county. The population density was 448.6 inhabitants per square mile (173.2/km^{2}). The 74,837 housing units had an average density of 202.6 per square mile (78.2/km^{2}). The racial makeup of the county was 89.2% White, 4.7% Black or African American, 2.6% Asian, 0.2% American Indian, 1.3% from other races, and 2.1% from two or more races. Those of Hispanic or Latino origin made up 4.7% of the population. In terms of ancestry, 24.6% were Italian, 21.2% were Irish, 14.0% were English, 13.5% were German, 11.1% were Polish, and 3.4% were American.

Of the 67,202 households, 29.4% had children under 18 living with them, 51.9% were married couples living together, 9.4% had a female householder with no husband present, 34.9% were not families, and 28.2% were made up of individuals. The average household size was 2.39, and the average family size was 2.95. The median age was 43.1 years.

The median income in the county for a household was $74,906 and for a family was $91,589. Males had a median income of $62,031 versus $50,031 for females. The per capita income for the county was $37,519. About 3.0% of families and 6.1% of the population were below the poverty line, including 6.7% of those under 18 and 4.3% of those 65 or over.

=== 2000 census ===
As of the 2000 census, 155,071 people, 61,341 households, and 40,607 families lived in the county. The population density was 420 inhabitants per square mile (160/km^{2}). The 67,285 housing units had an average density of 182 per square mile (70/km^{2}).

Of the 61,341 households, 30.3% had children under 18 living with them, 54.4% were married couples living together, 8.8% had a female householder with no husband present, and 33.8% were not families, 27.2% were made up of individuals, and 10.0% had someone living alone who was 65 or older. The average household size was 2.43, and the average family size was 2.98.

In the county, the age distribution was 23.2% under 18, 7.3% from 18 to 24, 31.1% from 25 to 44, 24.8% from 45 to 64, and 13.6% who were 65 or older. The median age was 39 years. For every 100 females, there were 95.10 males. For every 100 females 18 and over, there were 92.1 males.

The median income in the county for a household was $59,175 and for a family was $71,319. Males had a median income of $48,341 versus $35,607 for females. The per capita income for the county was $28,251. About 2.3% of families and 4.6% of the population were below the poverty line, including 4.0% of those under 18 and 5.9% of those 65 or over.

=== Demographic breakdown by town ===
==== Income ====
Data is from the 2010 United States Census and the 2006-2010 American Community Survey 5-Year Estimates.

| Rank | Town | | Per capita income | Median household income | Median family income | Population | Number of households |
|---|---|---|---|---|---|---|---|
| 1 | Fenwick | Borough | $110,127 | $114,375 | $250,000+ | 43 | 26 |
| 2 | Essex | Town | $57,365 | $87,480 | $105,982 | 6,683 | 2,916 |
| 3 | Killingworth | Town | $45,404 | $99,500 | $108,232 | 6,525 | 2,474 |
| 4 | Old Saybrook | Town | $43,400 | $79,985 | $99,595 | 10,242 | 4,247 |
| 5 | Cromwell | Town | $41,926 | $82,012 | $99,362 | 14,005 | 5,752 |
| 6 | Chester | Town | $40,783 | $80,185 | $89,760 | 3,994 | 1,714 |
| 7 | Durham | Town | $39,579 | $105,417 | $110,583 | 7,388 | 2,610 |
| 8 | Portland | Town | $39,100 | $86,661 | $96,016 | 9,508 | 3,822 |
| 9 | Westbrook | Town | $38,158 | $61,069 | $72,969 | 6,938 | 2,948 |
| 10 | Haddam | Town | $37,324 | $86,179 | $100,343 | 8,346 | 3,218 |
| 11 | East Haddam | Town | $37,156 | $82,695 | $86,023 | 9,126 | 3,593 |
| 12 | Clinton | Town | $37,117 | $74,174 | $82,839 | 13,260 | 5,303 |
| 13 | Middlefield | Town | $36,747 | $80,392 | $94,432 | 4,425 | 1,742 |
| 14 | Deep River | Town | $35,564 | $65,250 | $81,641 | 4,629 | 1,940 |
| 15 | East Hampton | Town | $34,555 | $88,281 | $95,854 | 12,959 | 5,060 |
| 16 | Middletown | City | $31,348 | $57,655 | $78,006 | 47,648 | 19,863 |

==== Race ====
Data are from the 2007-2011 American Community Survey Five-Year Estimates, ACS Demographic and Housing Estimates, "Race alone or in combination with one or more other races."

| Rank | Town | | Population | White | Black | Asian | American Indian | Other | Hispanic |
|---|---|---|---|---|---|---|---|---|---|
| 1 | Middletown | City | 47,510 | 79.2% | 15.7% | 4.9% | 0.6% | 3.2% | 8.1% |
| 2 | Cromwell | Town | 13,951 | 93.2% | 3.9% | 3.3% | 0.3% | 0.5% | 4.2% |
| 3 | Clinton | Town | 13,291 | 95.8% | 0.5% | 2.1% | 0.2% | 1.8% | 3.5% |
| 4 | East Hampton | Town | 12,926 | 95.4% | 1.6% | 1.7% | 0.3% | 1.9% | 3.8% |
| 5 | Old Saybrook | Town | 10,307 | 97.8% | 0.7% | 1.8% | 0.6% | 0.0% | 0.4% |
| 6 | Portland | Town | 9,470 | 96.2% | 2.2% | 1.0% | 0.2% | 1.9% | 4.4% |
| 7 | East Haddam | Town | 9,069 | 99.3% | 1.2% | 0.0% | 0.2% | 0.7% | 0.9% |
| 8 | Haddam | Town | 8,267 | 98.5% | 1.5% | 0.5% | 1.5% | 0.2% | 2.6% |
| 9 | Durham | Town | 7,342 | 94.7% | 0.5% | 3.1% | 0.2% | 3.2% | 5.3% |
| 10 | Westbrook | Town | 6,891 | 95.4% | 0.5% | 4.0% | 1.2% | 0.0% | 4.5% |
| 11 | Essex | Town | 6,697 | 98.8% | 0.6% | 1.4% | 0.1% | 0.1% | 0.6% |
| 12 | Killingworth | Town | 6,499 | 96.7% | 0.0% | 7.5% | 1.4% | 0.7% | 3.0% |
| 13 | Deep River | Town | 4,652 | 88.7% | 2.0% | 0.3% | 0.8% | 7.5% | 8.6% |
| 14 | Middlefield | Town | 4,418 | 94.3% | 1.7% | 4.2% | 0.0% | 0.7% | 1.5% |
| 15 | Chester | Town | 3,984 | 98.3% | 0.4% | 1.7% | 0.7% | 0.0% | 2.6% |
| 16 | Fenwick | Borough | 51 | 100.0% | 5.9% | 0.0% | 0.0% | 0.0% | 0.0% |

== Communities ==
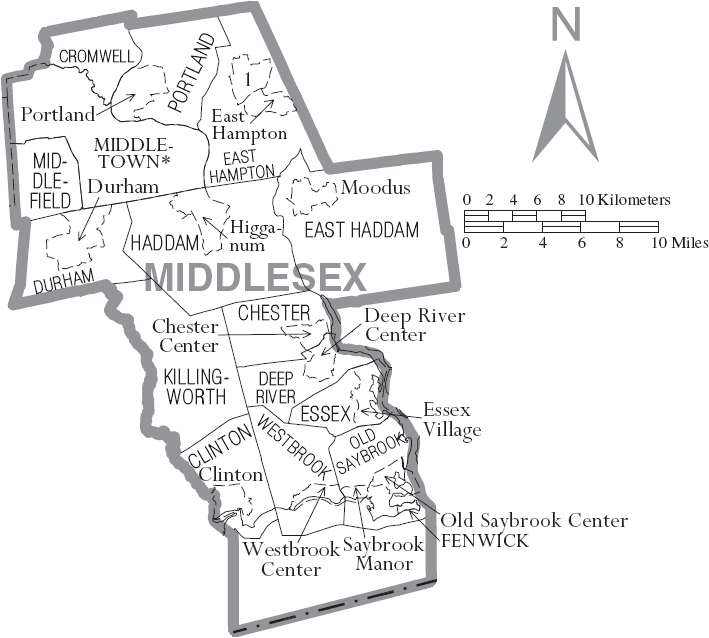
Map of Middlesex County, Connecticut showing cities, boroughs, towns, and CDPs

=== City ===
- Middletown

=== Towns ===
Villages are named localities within towns, but have no separate corporate existence from the towns they are in.

- Chester
  - Chester Center
- Clinton
  - Clinton village
- Cromwell
- Deep River
  - Deep River Center
  - Winthrop
- Durham
  - Durham village
- East Haddam
  - Leesville
  - Millington
  - Moodus
- East Hampton
  - Cobalt
  - East Hampton village
  - Lake Pocotopaug
  - Middle Haddam
- Essex
  - Centerbrook
  - Essex Village
  - Ivoryton
- Haddam
  - Hidden Lake
  - Higganum
- Killingworth
- Middlefield
  - Rockfall
- Old Saybrook
  - Fenwick
  - Old Saybrook Center
  - Saybrook Manor
- Portland
  - Portland village
- Westbrook
  - Westbrook Center

== Politics ==
Middlesex County was a Republican-leaning county for most of its history, but since 1992, it has become reliably Democratic.

United States presidential election results for Middlesex County, Connecticut
| Year | Republican | | Democratic | | Third party(ies) | |
| Year | No. | % | No. | % | No. | % |
|---|---|---|---|---|---|---|
| 1884 | 3,896 | 50.57% | 3,459 | 44.90% | 349 | 4.53% |
| 1888 | 4,363 | 52.88% | 3,613 | 43.79% | 275 | 3.33% |
| 1892 | 4,316 | 51.06% | 3,762 | 44.51% | 374 | 4.42% |
| 1896 | 5,664 | 67.67% | 2,245 | 26.82% | 461 | 5.51% |
| 1900 | 5,000 | 60.81% | 3,102 | 37.72% | 121 | 1.47% |
| 1904 | 4,991 | 60.00% | 3,167 | 38.07% | 160 | 1.92% |
| 1908 | 5,071 | 61.92% | 2,935 | 35.84% | 183 | 2.23% |
| 1912 | 2,892 | 35.43% | 3,393 | 41.57% | 1,878 | 23.01% |
| 1916 | 4,524 | 53.42% | 3,765 | 44.46% | 179 | 2.11% |
| 1920 | 8,447 | 65.24% | 4,170 | 32.21% | 331 | 2.56% |
| 1924 | 9,383 | 65.22% | 4,009 | 27.87% | 994 | 6.91% |
| 1928 | 11,205 | 59.92% | 7,380 | 39.47% | 115 | 0.61% |
| 1932 | 10,770 | 52.79% | 9,286 | 45.52% | 344 | 1.69% |
| 1936 | 10,925 | 46.34% | 12,294 | 52.14% | 359 | 1.52% |
| 1940 | 13,447 | 50.69% | 13,044 | 49.17% | 39 | 0.15% |
| 1944 | 14,315 | 51.05% | 13,551 | 48.32% | 176 | 0.63% |
| 1948 | 16,119 | 51.56% | 14,609 | 46.73% | 537 | 1.72% |
| 1952 | 22,157 | 58.38% | 15,722 | 41.43% | 73 | 0.19% |
| 1956 | 25,496 | 64.80% | 13,851 | 35.20% | 0 | 0.00% |
| 1960 | 22,045 | 49.87% | 22,158 | 50.13% | 1 | 0.00% |
| 1964 | 14,697 | 32.45% | 30,517 | 67.39% | 71 | 0.16% |
| 1968 | 21,999 | 45.34% | 23,727 | 48.90% | 2,798 | 5.77% |
| 1972 | 33,249 | 57.90% | 23,573 | 41.05% | 602 | 1.05% |
| 1976 | 31,115 | 51.39% | 29,097 | 48.05% | 338 | 0.56% |
| 1980 | 28,989 | 45.53% | 24,768 | 38.90% | 9,915 | 15.57% |
| 1984 | 39,580 | 59.32% | 26,915 | 40.34% | 227 | 0.34% |
| 1988 | 34,682 | 50.01% | 33,946 | 48.95% | 716 | 1.03% |
| 1992 | 24,646 | 30.42% | 34,707 | 42.83% | 21,674 | 26.75% |
| 1996 | 22,960 | 31.98% | 37,695 | 52.51% | 11,131 | 15.51% |
| 2000 | 29,295 | 37.83% | 43,319 | 55.94% | 4,819 | 6.22% |
| 2004 | 35,252 | 41.97% | 47,292 | 56.31% | 1,440 | 1.71% |
| 2008 | 32,918 | 37.73% | 52,984 | 60.72% | 1,351 | 1.55% |
| 2012 | 34,591 | 41.41% | 47,855 | 57.29% | 1,092 | 1.31% |
| 2016 | 38,867 | 43.86% | 45,357 | 51.18% | 4,400 | 4.96% |
| 2020 | 40,665 | 40.99% | 56,848 | 57.30% | 1,690 | 1.70% |
| 2024 | 41,654 | 42.71% | 54,173 | 55.55% | 1,692 | 1.74% |

United States Senate election results for Middlesex County, Connecticut1
| Year | Republican | | Democratic | | Third party(ies) | |
| Year | No. | % | No. | % | No. | % |
|---|---|---|---|---|---|---|
| 2012 | 35,474 | 43.91% | 43,591 | 53.96% | 1,716 | 2.12% |
| 2018 | 32,836 | 41.74% | 44,886 | 57.06% | 945 | 1.20% |
| 2024 | 39,156 | 41.10% | 54,503 | 57.21% | 1,603 | 1.68% |

United States Senate election results for Middlesex County, Connecticut2
| Year | Republican | | Democratic | | Third party(ies) | |
| Year | No. | % | No. | % | No. | % |
|---|---|---|---|---|---|---|
| 2010 | 27,991 | 42.80% | 36,258 | 55.44% | 1,150 | 1.76% |
| 2016 | 30,996 | 35.66% | 53,960 | 62.09% | 1,957 | 2.25% |
| 2022 | 32,430 | 43.62% | 41,911 | 56.37% | 5 | 0.01% |

Connecticut Gubernatorial election results for Middlesex County
| Year | Republican | | Democratic | | Third party(ies) | |
| Year | No. | % | No. | % | No. | % |
|---|---|---|---|---|---|---|
| 2010 | 32,102 | 49.29% | 31,313 | 48.08% | 1,710 | 2.63% |
| 2014 | 31,342 | 49.24% | 31,478 | 49.45% | 833 | 1.31% |
| 2018 | 38,678 | 48.54% | 36,483 | 45.78% | 4,524 | 5.68% |
| 2022 | 32,940 | 44.02% | 41,052 | 54.87% | 830 | 1.11% |

== See also ==
- National Register of Historic Places listings in Middlesex County, Connecticut
