= 1996 United States presidential election in Connecticut =

- November 5, 1996
- Turnout: 74.99%

Nominee	Bill Clinton	Bob Dole	Ross Perot
Party	Democratic	Republican	Reform
Home state	Arkansas	Kansas	Texas
Running mate	Al Gore	Jack Kemp	Patrick Choate
Electoral vote	8	0	0
Popular vote	735,740	483,109	139,523
Percentage	52.83%	34.69%	10.02%

Clinton
40–50%
50–60%
60–70%
70–80%
80–90%
Dole
40–50%
50–60%
60–70%
President before election
Bill Clinton
Democratic
Elected President
Bill Clinton
Democratic

The 1996 United States presidential election in Connecticut took place on November 5, 1996, as part of the 1996 United States presidential election. Voters chose eight representatives, or electors to the Electoral College, who voted for president and vice president.

Connecticut was won by incumbent Democratic President Bill Clinton, who took 52.83% of the vote over Republican Senator Bob Dole of Kansas, who took 34.69%, a victory margin of 18.14%. The Reform Party candidate, Texas billionaire Ross Perot, finished in third, with 10.02% of the popular vote.

Clinton's decisive win was indicative of a major shift toward the Democratic Party throughout the Northeast in the 1990s. Connecticut had previously been a Republican-leaning swing state, with Republicans winning it in the 1970s and 80s but Clinton carrying it by a fairly close 42-36 plurality in 1992. However, in 1996 Clinton not only won by double digits, but swept every county in the state, including traditionally Republican Fairfield County and Litchfield County, the first Democrat to do so since Lyndon B. Johnson in 1964. Clinton's gains proved enduring, as every county except Litchfield voted Democratic in all elections that followed until Donald Trump won Windham County in 2016. Consequently, the state has become a reliably blue state in presidential elections, with Democratic nominees winning the state by double digits in every election since.

To date, this is the last time that the towns of Morris and Thomaston voted Democratic.

Among white voters, 48% supported Clinton, while 42% supported Dole. 9% supported Perot.

== Results ==
1996 United States presidential election in Connecticut
Party	Candidate	Running mate	Votes	Percentage	Electoral votes
Democratic	Bill Clinton (incumbent)	Al Gore (incumbent)	735,740	52.83%	8
Republican	Bob Dole	Jack Kemp	483,109	34.69%	0
Reform	Ross Perot	Patrick Choate	139,523	10.02%	0
Green	Ralph Nader	Winona LaDuke	24,321	1.75%	0
Libertarian	Harry Browne	Jo Jorgensen	5,788	0.42%	0
Concerned Citizens	Howard Phillips	Joseph Zdonczyk	2,425	0.17%	0
Natural Law	Dr. John Hagelin	Dr. V. Tompkins	1,703	0.12%	0
Write-in	James Harris		4	0.00%	0
No party	Write-in		1	0.00%	0

=== By county ===
County	Bill Clinton Democratic		Bob Dole Republican		Various candidates Other parties		Margin		Total votes cast
County	#	%	#	%	#	%	#	%	Total votes cast
Fairfield	172,337	48.93%	144,632	41.06%	35,258	10.01%	27,705	7.87%	352,227
Hartford	203,549	57.04%	111,566	31.26%	41,726	11.70%	91,983	25.78%	356,841
Litchfield	37,375	45.92%	31,645	38.88%	12,378	15.20%	5,730	7.04%	81,398
Middlesex	37,695	52.51%	22,960	31.98%	11,131	15.51%	14,735	20.53%	71,786
New Haven	178,323	54.72%	106,636	32.72%	40,932	12.56%	71,687	22.00%	325,891
New London	54,377	52.74%	33,039	32.05%	15,679	15.21%	21,338	20.69%	103,095
Tolland	30,007	51.18%	19,394	33.08%	9,224	15.74%	10,613	18.10%	58,625
Windham	22,077	51.65%	13,237	30.97%	7,432	17.38%	8,840	20.68%	42,746
Totals	735,740	52.83%	483,109	34.69%	173,765	12.48%	252,631	18.14%	1,392,614

Counties that flipped from Republican to Democratic

- Fairfield
- Litchfield

=== By congressional district ===
Clinton won all six congressional districts, including two that elected Republicans.

District	Clinton	Dole	Perot	Representative
1st	59%	30%	9%	Barbara Kennelly
2nd	53%	32%	13%	Sam Gejdenson
3rd	57%	31%	10%	Rosa DeLauro
4th	51%	40%	7%	Chris Shays
5th	48%	40%	10%	Gary Franks (104th Congress)
5th	48%	40%	10%	James Maloney (105th Congress)
6th	50%	36%	11%	Nancy Johnson

== See also ==
- United States presidential elections in Connecticut
- Presidency of Bill Clinton
