= 2016 United States presidential election in Connecticut =

- November 8, 2016
- Turnout: 76.94% ▲

Nominee	Hillary Clinton	Donald Trump
Party	Democratic	Republican
Home state	New York	New York
Running mate	Tim Kaine	Mike Pence
Electoral vote	7	0
Popular vote	897,572	673,215
Percentage	54.57%	40.93%

Clinton
40–50%
50–60%
60–70%
70–80%
80–90%
90–100%
Trump
40–50%
50–60%
60–70%
President before election
Barack Obama
Democratic
Elected President
Donald Trump
Republican

Treemap of the popular vote by county.

The 2016 United States presidential election in Connecticut was held on Tuesday, November 8, 2016, as part of the 2016 United States presidential election in which all 50 states plus the District of Columbia participated. Connecticut voters chose electors to represent them in the Electoral College via a popular vote, pitting the Republican Party's nominee, businessman Donald Trump, and running mate Indiana Governor Mike Pence against Democratic Party nominee, former Secretary of State Hillary Clinton, and her running mate Virginia Senator Tim Kaine. Connecticut has seven electoral votes in the Electoral College.

Clinton won the state by 13.64%, a smaller margin of victory than outgoing President Barack Obama's 17.33% in 2012. Clinton carried six of the state's eight counties; however, Trump was the first Republican presidential candidate to win Windham County since George H. W. Bush in 1988. This is the first election since 1940 in which Connecticut did not vote the same as Michigan, something that would be seen again in 2024.

Trump's strongest county in the state was rural Litchfield County, while Clinton's biggest win was in adjacent, more urban Hartford County. Areas that swung in Clinton's favor were mainly concentrated in suburban Fairfield County, in towns like Greenwich, Darien, New Canaan, and Westport. This area is home to many New York City commuters. Other Democratic swings happened in suburbs outside Hartford, such as Avon, Granby, East Granby, and Glastonbury, as well as outside New Haven, in towns like Guilford, Madison, and Woodbridge. This was the first time since 1888 that Darien and the first time since 1912 that Easton voted Democratic, largely due to opposition to the populist Trump among historically Republican affluent and educated voters. By contrast, areas that swung hard for Trump were mainly located in Windham County and northern New London County, in towns like Killingly, Sterling, Plainfield, and Voluntown. This mirrored a national trend of Trump gaining White working-class support.

== Primary elections ==
=== Democratic primary ===
Three candidates appeared on the Democratic presidential primary ballot:

- Bernie Sanders
- Hillary Clinton
- Rocky De La Fuente

==== Results ====
2016 Democratic Party's presidential nominating process in Connecticut – Summary of results –
Candidate	Popular vote		Estimated delegates		
Candidate	Count	Percentage	Pledged	Unpledged	Total
Hillary Clinton	170,045	51.80%	28	15	43
Bernie Sanders	152,379	46.42%	27	0	27
Roque "Rocky" De La Fuente	960	0.29%	0	0	0
Uncommitted	4,871	1.48%	0	1	1
Total	328,255	100%	55	16	71

=== Republican primary ===
Republican primary results by county(left) and municipality(right).
Donald Trump
- 40–50%
- 50–60%
- 60–70%
- 70–80%
John Kasich
- 40–50%

Four candidates appeared on the Republican presidential primary ballot:

- Ben Carson (withdrawn)
- Ted Cruz
- John Kasich
- Donald Trump

==== Results ====
Connecticut Republican primary, April 26, 2016
Candidate	Votes	Percentage	Actual delegate count		
Candidate	Votes	Percentage	Bound	Unbound	Total
Donald Trump	123,523	57.86%	28	0	28
John Kasich	60,522	28.35%	0	0	0
Ted Cruz	24,987	11.70%	0	0	0
Uncommitted	2,728	1.28%	0	0	0
Ben Carson (withdrawn)	1,733	0.81%	0	0	0
Unprojected delegates:			0	0	0
Total:	213,493	100.00%	28	0	28
Source: The Green Papers

== General election ==
=== Polling ===
Clinton won every pre-election poll conducted. An average of the final 3 polls showed Clinton leading 49% to 38%, and the final poll showed Clinton leading Trump 50% to 35%.

=== Predictions ===
Source	Ranking	As of
Los Angeles Times	Safe D	November 6, 2016
CNN	Safe D	November 4, 2016
Cook Political Report	Safe D	November 7, 2016
Electoral-vote.com	Safe D	November 8, 2016
Rothenberg Political Report	Safe D	November 7, 2016
Sabato's Crystal Ball	Safe D	November 7, 2016
RealClearPolitics	Lean D	November 8, 2016
Fox News	Safe D	November 7, 2016

=== Results ===

2016 United States presidential election in Connecticut
Party	Candidate	Votes	%
Democratic	Hillary Clinton	897,572	54.57%
Republican	Donald Trump	673,215	40.93%
Libertarian	Gary Johnson	48,676	2.96%
Green	Jill Stein	22,841	1.39%
Independent	Evan McMullin (write-in)	2,108	0.13%
Write-in		361	0.02%
Constitution	Darrell Castle (write-in)	147	0.01%
Total votes		1,644,920	100.00%

==== By county ====
County	Hillary Clinton Democratic		Donald Trump Republican		Various candidates Other parties		Margin		Total votes cast
County	#	%	#	%	#	%	#	%	Total votes cast
Fairfield	243,852	57.89%	160,077	38.00%	17,280	4.11%	83,775	19.89%	421,209
Hartford	240,403	59.09%	148,173	36.42%	18,288	4.49%	92,230	22.67%	406,864
Litchfield	39,775	40.82%	53,051	54.44%	4,616	4.74%	-13,276	-13.62%	97,442
Middlesex	45,357	51.18%	38,867	43.86%	4,400	4.96%	6,490	7.32%	88,624
New Haven	205,609	54.25%	159,048	41.96%	14,349	3.79%	46,561	12.29%	379,006
New London	62,278	50.42%	54,058	43.76%	7,192	5.82%	8,220	6.66%	123,528
Tolland	38,506	49.73%	34,194	44.16%	4,724	6.11%	4,312	5.57%	77,424
Windham	21,792	42.88%	25,747	50.66%	3,284	6.46%	-3,955	-7.78%	50,823
Total	897,572	54.57%	673,215	40.93%	74,133	4.50%	224,357	13.64%	1,644,920

Counties that flipped from Democratic to Republican

- Windham (largest town: Windham)

==== By congressional district ====
Clinton won all five congressional districts.

District	Clinton	Trump	Representative
1st	59%	36%	John B. Larson
2nd	49%	46%	Joe Courtney
3rd	56%	40%	Rosa DeLauro
4th	60%	37%	Jim Himes
5th	50%	46%	Elizabeth Esty

=== Turnout ===
According to Connecticut's Secretary of State Elections Night Reporting website, voter turnout was 76.94% with 1,675,934 voters checked reported out of 2,178,169 registered voters reported.

== See also ==
- United States presidential elections in Connecticut
- First presidency of Donald Trump
- 2016 Democratic Party presidential debates and forums
- 2016 Democratic Party presidential primaries
- 2016 Republican Party presidential debates and forums
- 2016 Republican Party presidential primaries
