= 2012 United States presidential election in Connecticut =

- November 6, 2012
- Turnout: 73.77%

Nominee	Barack Obama	Mitt Romney
Party	Democratic	Republican
Home state	Illinois	Massachusetts
Running mate	Joe Biden	Paul Ryan
Electoral vote	7	0
Popular vote	905,109	634,899
Percentage	58.06%	40.72%

Obama
40–50%
50–60%
60–70%
70–80%
80–90%
90–100%
Romney
40–50%
50–60%
60–70%
Tie
40–50%
President before election
Barack Obama
Democratic
Elected President
Barack Obama
Democratic

The 2012 United States presidential election in Connecticut took place on November 6, 2012, as part of the 2012 United States presidential election in which all 50 states plus the District of Columbia participated. Connecticut voters chose seven electors to represent them in the Electoral College via a popular vote pitting incumbent Democratic President Barack Obama and his running mate, Vice President Joe Biden, against Republican challenger and former Massachusetts Governor Mitt Romney and his running mate, Congressman Paul Ryan. Obama and Biden carried Connecticut with 58.1% of the popular vote to Romney's and Ryan's 40.7%, thus winning the state's seven electoral votes. Romney managed to flip the traditionally Republican Litchfield County, which Obama had won in 2008. As of the 2020 United States presidential election, this was the last election that the Democratic presidential nominee won Windham County.

To date, this is the last time that the towns of Berlin, Bozrah, Brooklyn, Chaplin, East Haven, Franklin, Griswold, Killingly, Lebanon, Lisbon, Naugatuck, North Branford, North Haven, North Stonington, Plainfield, Plainville, Putnam, Salem, Southington, Sprague, Stafford, Union, and Voluntown voted Democratic and the last time that the towns of Avon, Darien, East Granby, Easton, Granby, Greenwich, New Canaan, Newtown, Ridgefield, and Wilton voted Republican. This is also the most recent election in which Woodstock voted for the losing candidate.

== Primary elections ==
=== Democratic primary ===
As Barack Obama was the only candidate to qualify, no Democratic primary was held.

=== Republican primary ===
2012 Connecticut Republican presidential primary
- April 24, 2012

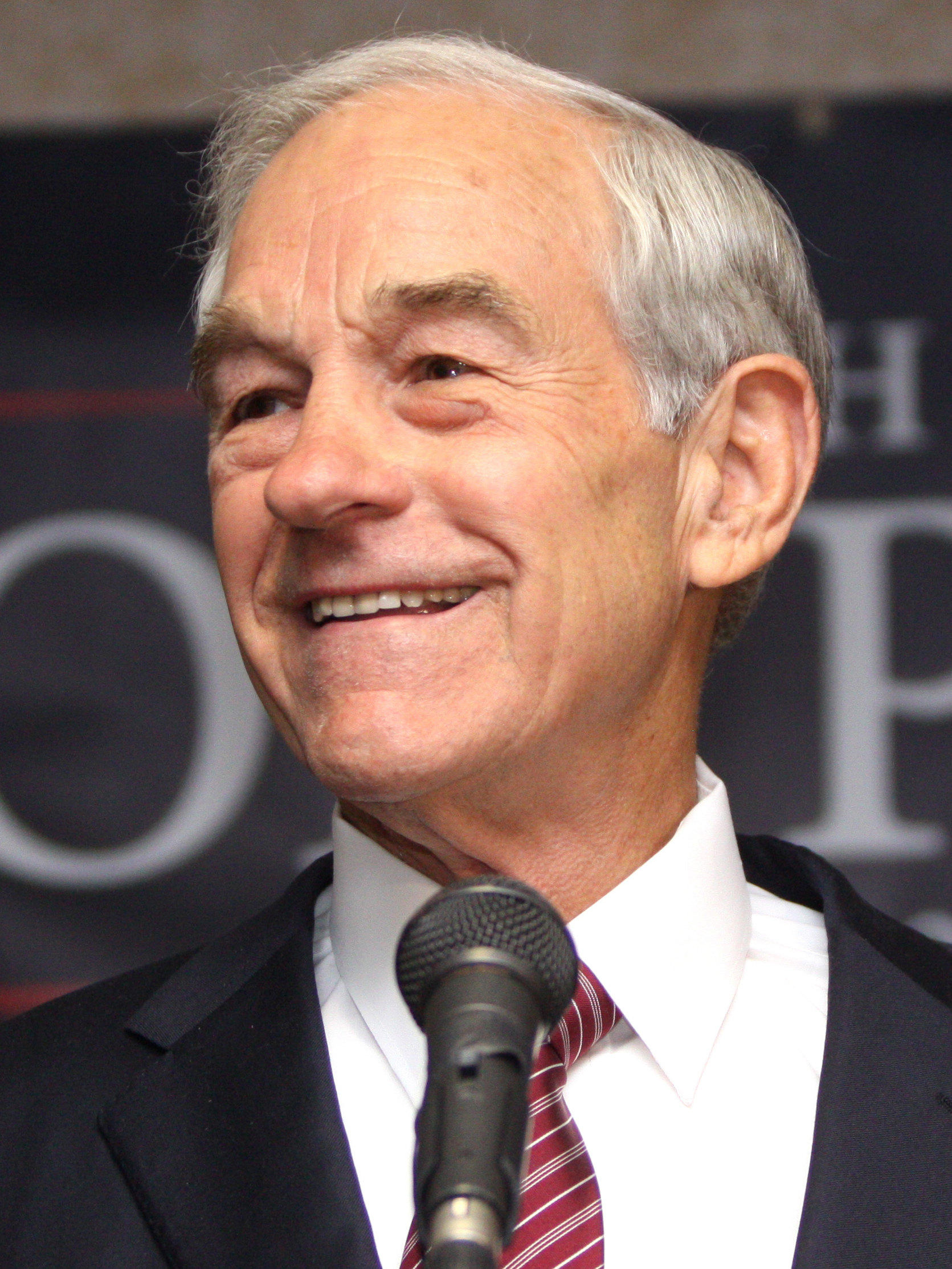

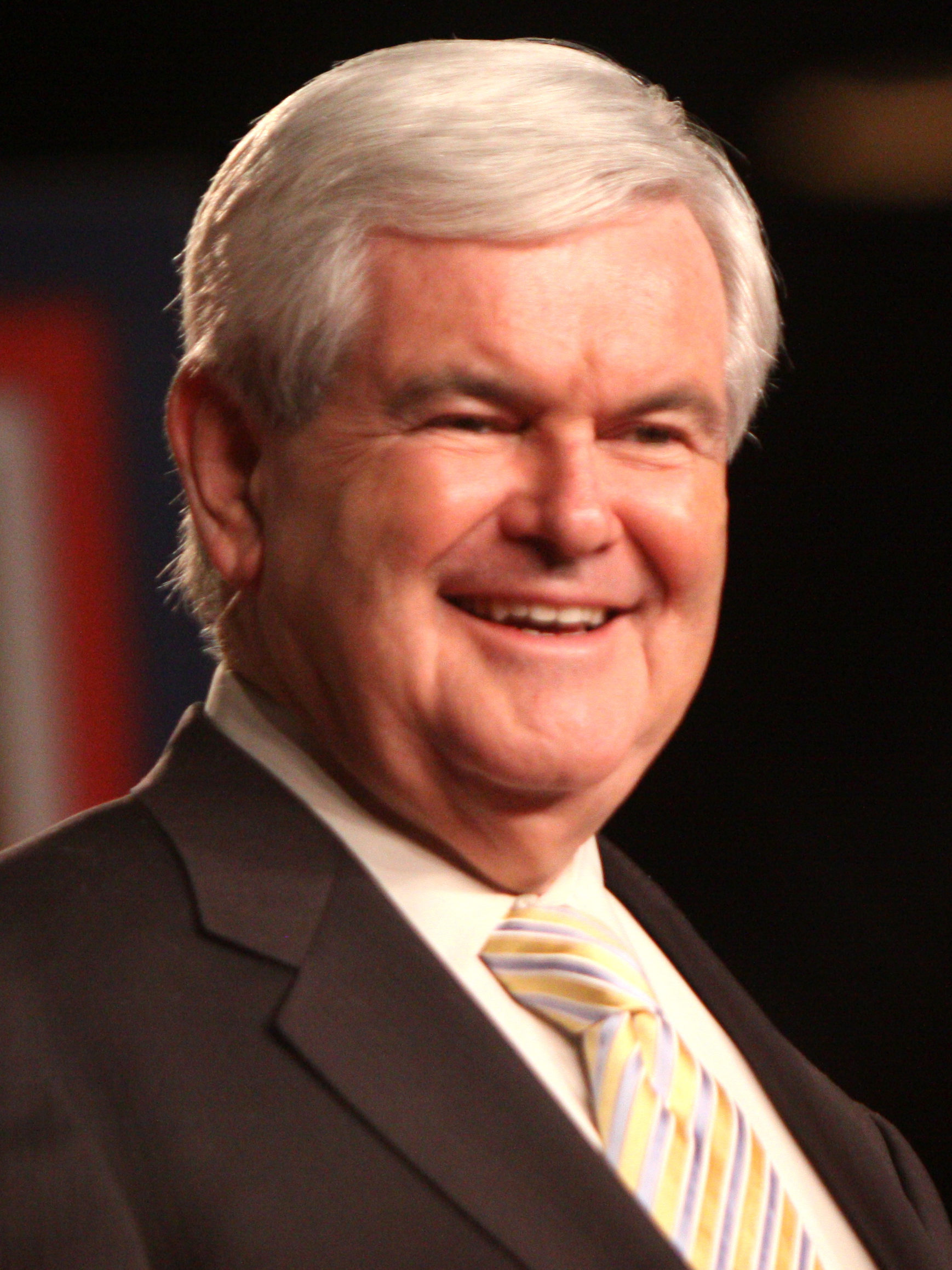

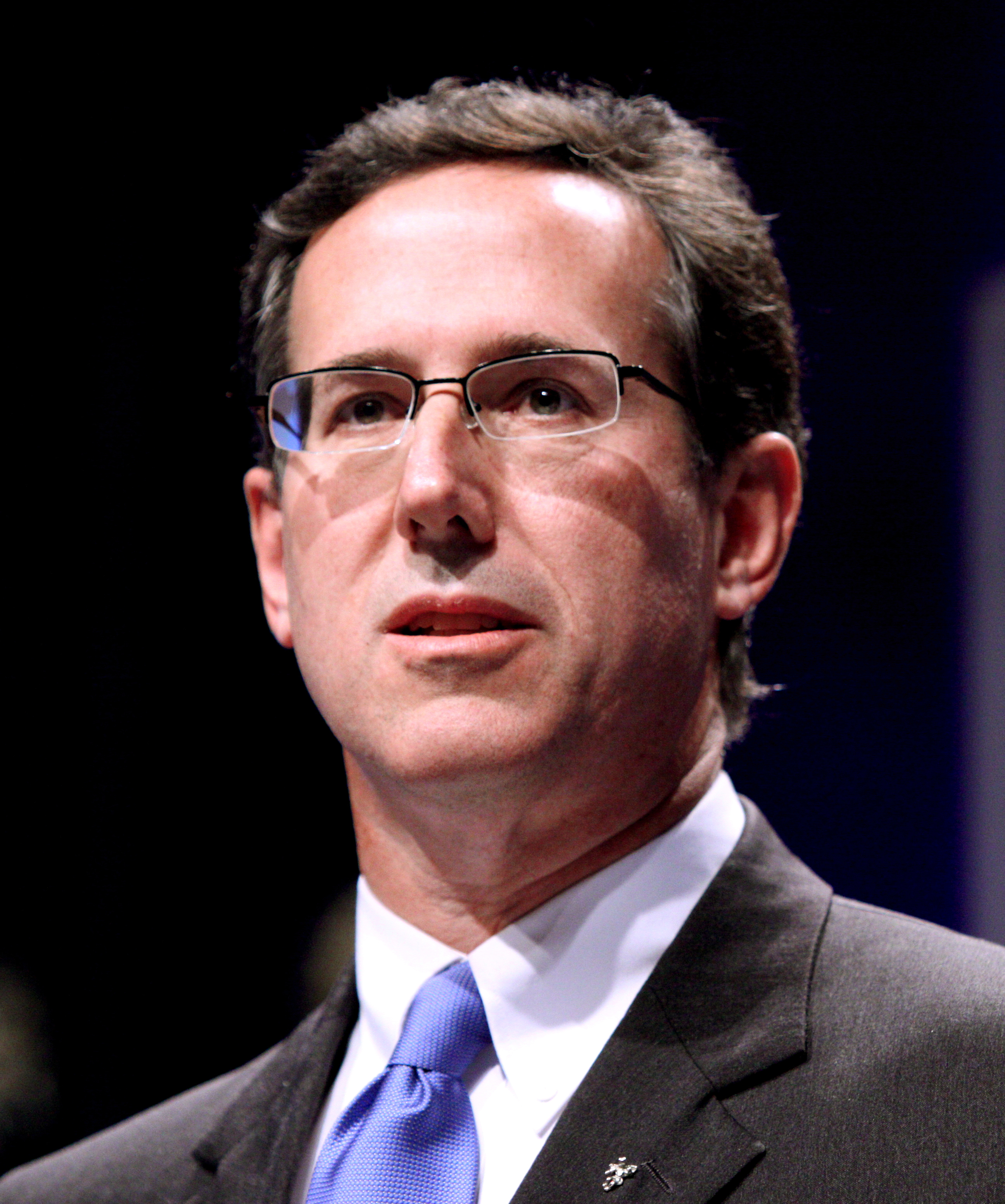
Candidate	Mitt Romney	Ron Paul
Home state	Massachusetts	Texas
Delegate count	25	0
Popular vote	40,171	8,032
Percentage	67.43%	13.48%
Candidate	Newt Gingrich	Rick Santorum
Home state	Georgia	Pennsylvania
Delegate count	0	0
Popular vote	6,135	4,072
Percentage	10.30%	6.83%
- County results Mitt Romney (Note: Italicization indicates a withdrawn candidacy)

The 2012 Connecticut Republican presidential primary took place on April 24, 2012. It was a closed primary, open only to Republican electors. 25 of the state's 28 delegates to the 2012 Republican National Convention were decided by the primary outcome, with the other 3 being superdelegates: the state party chairman and the state's two Republican National Committee representatives.

Mitt Romney won the primary by a wide margin, garnering two-thirds of the vote. Only 14.4% of active registered Republicans participated in the primary, the lowest turnout since the primary format was put in place in the state in 1980.

==== Process ====
After switching from proportional distribution of delegates to a winner-take-all system in 1996, the Connecticut Republican Party voted in September 2011 to award delegates by a hybrid winner-take-all and proportional distribution process beginning with the 2012 primary. Of the 25 regular delegates at stake in the primary, the party called for three delegates to be awarded to the winner of each of the state's five congressional districts on a winner-take-all basis for a total of 15 delegates. The remaining 10 would be distributed proportionally based on the statewide vote total among candidates receiving at least 20% support unless a candidate won a majority of the statewide vote, in which case the candidate would receive all 10 of these delegates.

With Romney's primary day wins in all five congressional districts and a majority of the statewide vote, he was able to claim all 25 of the delegates at stake.

==== Opinion polling ====
Poll source	Date	1st	2nd	3rd	Other
Quinnipiac; Margin of error: ±4.7% Sample size: 429	Mar. 14–19, 2012	Mitt Romney; 42%	Rick Santorum; 19%	Newt Gingrich; 13%	Ron Paul 9%, Won't vote 3%, Don't know/No answer 14%
Public Policy Polling; Margin of error: ±4.9% Sample size: 400	Sep. 22–25, 2011	Mitt Romney; 25%	Rick Perry; 18%	Herman Cain; 10%	Newt Gingrich 10%, Ron Paul 10%, Michele Bachmann 8%, Jon Huntsman 3%, Rick Santorum 3%, Gary Johnson 1%, someone else/not sure 12%
Public Policy Polling; Margin of error: ±4.9% Sample size: 400	Sep. 22–25, 2011	Mitt Romney; 45%	Rick Perry; 36%	–	not sure 19%
Quinnipiac; Margin of error: ±5.4% Sample size: 332	Sep. 8–13, 2011	Mitt Romney; 37%	Rick Perry; 19%	Michele Bachmann; 8%	Sarah Palin 4%, Herman Cain 3%, Newt Gingrich 3%, Ron Paul 3%, Jon Huntsman 2%, Rick Santorum 1%, Thaddeus McCotter 0%, someone else/undecided 20%
Public Policy Polling; Margin of error: ±7.3% Sample size: 180	Oct. 27–29, 2010	Mitt Romney; 28%	Mike Huckabee; 15%	Newt Gingrich; 14%	Sarah Palin 11%, Tim Pawlenty 5%, Mike Pence 5%, Mitch Daniels 4%, John Thune 2%, someone else/undecided 18%

==== Results ====
2012 Connecticut Republican presidential primary
Candidate	Votes	Percentage	Delegates
Mitt Romney	40,171	67.43%	25
Ron Paul	8,032	13.48%	0
Newt Gingrich	6,135	10.30%	0
Rick Santorum	4,072	6.83%	0
Uncommitted	1,168	1.96%	0
Unprojected delegates:			0
Total:	59,578	100%	25

Official source reports a turnout of 59,639, with the difference from 59,578 likely due to blank ballots.

Key:	Suspended campaign prior to contest

== General election ==
=== Predictions ===
Source	Ranking	As of
Huffington Post	Safe D	November 6, 2012
CNN	Safe D	November 6, 2012
The New York Times	Safe D	November 6, 2012
The Washington Post	Safe D	November 6, 2012
RealClearPolitics	Solid D	November 6, 2012
Sabato's Crystal Ball	Solid D	November 5, 2012
FiveThirtyEight	Solid D	November 6, 2012

=== Ballot access ===
- Mitt Romney/Paul Ryan, Republican
- Barack Obama/Joseph Biden, Democratic
- Gary Johnson/James P. Gray, Libertarian
- Rocky Anderson/Luis J. Rodriguez, Justice

Write-in candidate access:

- Jill Stein/Cheri Honkala, Green
- Virgil Goode/Jim Clymer, Constitution
- Raymond Sizemore/Vicki Tomalin, Independent

=== Results ===
2012 United States presidential election in Connecticut
Party	Candidate	Running mate	Votes	Percentage	Electoral votes
Democratic	Barack Obama (incumbent)	Joe Biden (incumbent)	905,109	58.06%	7
Republican	Mitt Romney	Paul Ryan	634,899	40.72%	0
Libertarian	Gary Johnson	Jim Gray	12,580	0.81%	0
Justice	Rocky Anderson	Luis J. Rodriguez	5,487	0.35%	0
Green (Write-in)	Jill Stein (Write-in)	Cheri Honkala	863	0.06%	0
American Independent (Write-in)	Thomas Hoefling (Write-in)	Jonathan D. Ellis	25	0.00%	0
Write-ins	Write-ins		25	0.00%	0
Socialist Workers (Write-in)	James Harris (Write-in)	Maura DeLuca	5	0.00%	0
Totals			1,558,960	100.00%	7

==== By county ====
County	Barack Obama Democratic		Mitt Romney Republican		Various candidates Other parties		Margin		Total votes cast
County	#	%	#	%	#	%	#	%	Total votes cast
Fairfield	217,294	54.85%	175,168	44.22%	3,668	0.93%	42,126	10.63%	396,130
Hartford	244,639	62.37%	143,238	36.52%	4,363	1.11%	101,401	25.85%	392,240
Litchfield	43,856	47.45%	47,201	51.07%	1,370	1.48%	-3,345	-3.62%	92,427
Middlesex	47,855	57.29%	34,591	41.41%	1,092	1.30%	13,264	15.88%	83,538
New Haven	218,998	60.65%	138,364	38.32%	3,697	1.03%	80,634	22.33%	361,059
New London	67,144	58.33%	46,119	40.07%	1,839	1.60%	21,025	18.26%	115,102
Tolland	39,366	55.45%	30,450	42.89%	1,175	1.66%	8,916	12.56%	70,991
Windham	25,957	55.72%	19,768	42.43%	863	1.85%	6,189	13.29%	46,588
Totals	905,109	58.06%	634,899	40.72%	18,985	1.22%	270,210	17.34%	1,558,993

Counties that flipped from Democratic to Republican

- Litchfield (largest city: Torrington)

==== By congressional district ====
Obama won all five congressional districts.

District	Obama	Romney	Representative
1st	63%	36%	John B. Larson
2nd	56%	43%	Joe Courtney
3rd	63%	36%	Rosa DeLauro
4th	55%	44%	Jim Himes
5th	54%	45%	Elizabeth Esty

== Analysis ==
=== Voter demographics ===
2012 Connecticut presidential election (New York Times)
Demographic subgroup	Obama	Romney	% of total vote
Ideology
Liberals	93	6	28
Moderates	56	42	47
Conservatives	19	80	24
Party
Democrats	94	6	41
Republicans	9	91	26
Independents	51	46	32
Age
18–29 years old	66	30	13
30–44 years old	55	44	24
45–64 years old	58	41	43
65 and older	54	46	20
Gender
Men	51	47	47
Women	63	36	53
Marital status
Married	54	45	64
Unmarried	65	33	36
Race/ethnicity
White	51	48	79
Black	93	7	11
Latino	79	20	6
Education
Never attended college	62	37	41
Some college education	60	39	24
College graduate	49	49	31
Advanced degree	60	38	29
Income
Under $30K	73	24	12
$30K-$49K	73	26	13
$50K or more	53	46	75
$100K or more	53	46	46

== See also ==
- United States presidential elections in Connecticut
- Presidency of Barack Obama
- 2012 Republican Party presidential debates and forums
- 2012 Republican Party presidential primaries
- Results of the 2012 Republican Party presidential primaries
- Connecticut Republican Party
