= 1888 United States presidential election in Connecticut =

- November 6, 1888
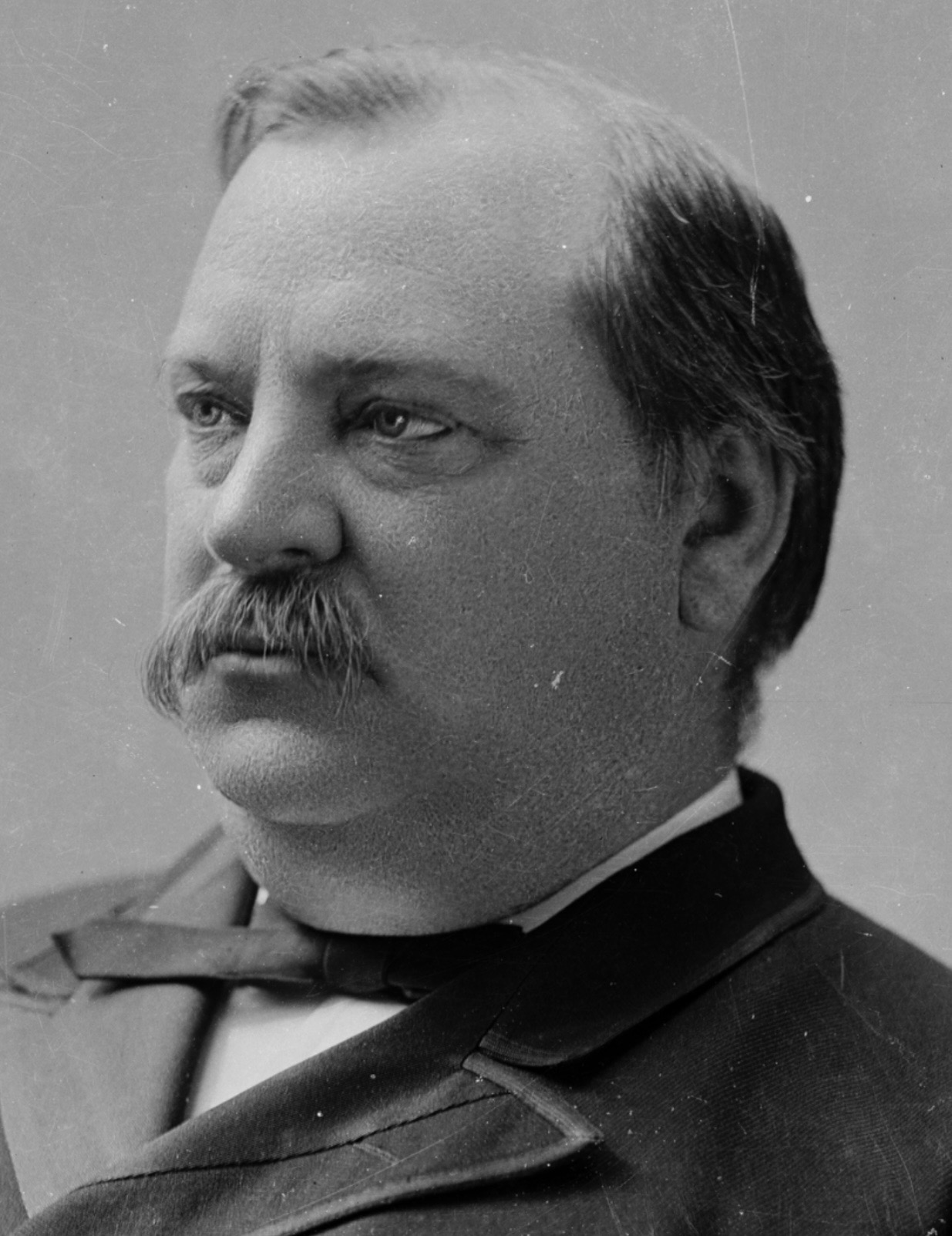

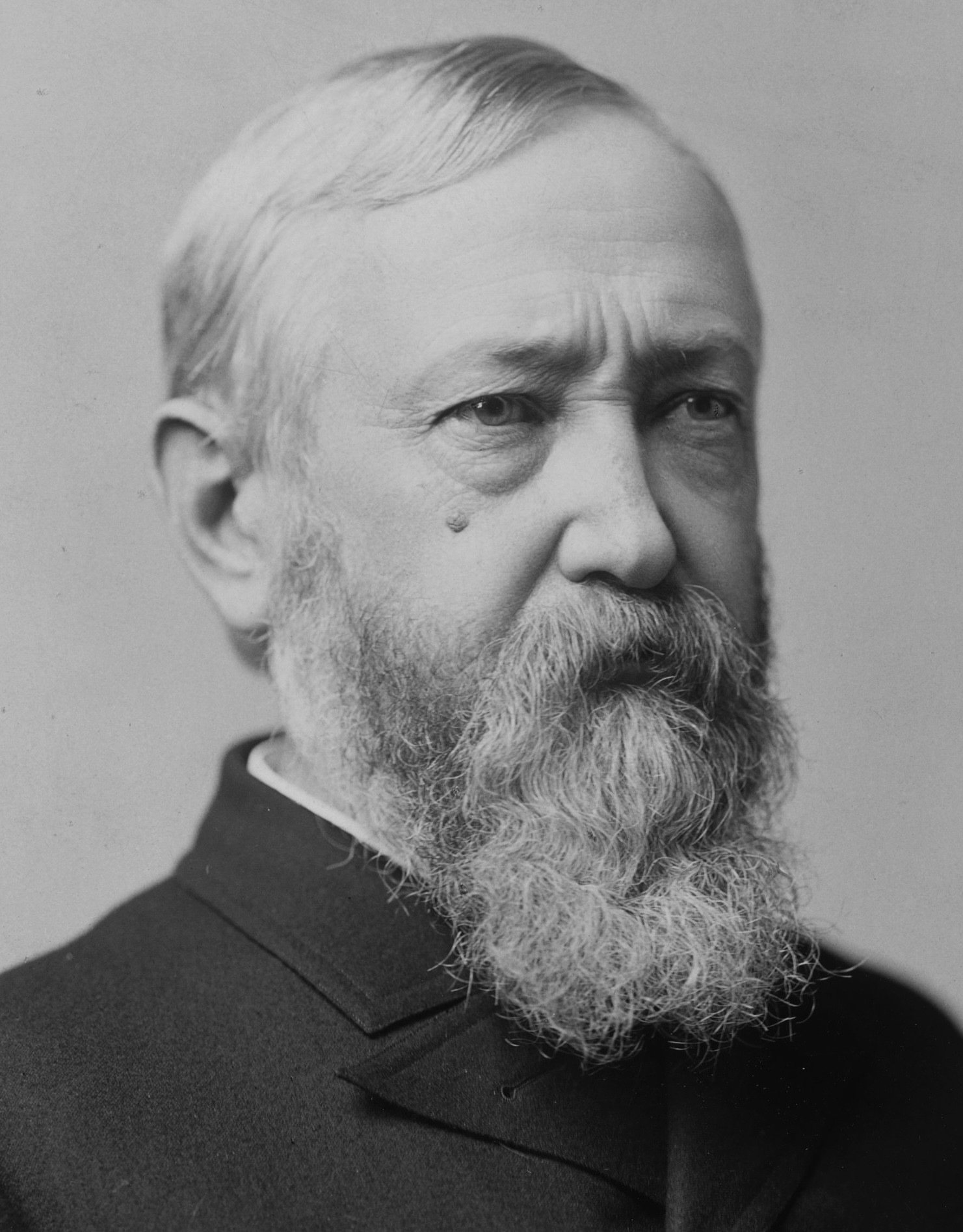
Nominee	Grover Cleveland	Benjamin Harrison
Party	Democratic	Republican
Home state	New York	Indiana
Running mate	Allen G. Thurman	Levi P. Morton
Electoral vote	6	0
Popular vote	74,920	74,584
Percentage	48.66%	48.44%

Cleveland
40–50%
50–60%
60–70%
70–80%
Harrison
40–50%
50–60%
60–70%
70–80%
President before election
Grover Cleveland
Democratic
Elected President
Benjamin Harrison
Republican

The 1888 United States presidential election in Connecticut took place on November 6, 1888, as part of the 1888 United States presidential election. Voters chose six representatives, or electors to the Electoral College, who voted for president and vice president.

Connecticut voted for the Democratic nominee, incumbent President Grover Cleveland over the Republican nominee Benjamin Harrison. Cleveland won the state by a very narrow margin of 0.22%; it was the only New England state that he carried in the election.

This was the first time Darien voted for a Democratic presidential candidate, and would be the last time until 2016 when Hillary Clinton won it by eleven points over Republican Donald Trump.

== Results ==
1888 United States presidential election in Connecticut
Party	Candidate	Running mate	Popular vote		Electoral vote	
Party	Candidate	Running mate	Count	%	Count	%
Democratic	Grover Cleveland of New York (incumbent)	Allen Granberry Thurman of New York	74,920	48.66%	6	100.00%
Republican	Benjamin Harrison of Indiana	Levi Parsons Morton of New York	74,584	48.44%	0	0.00%
Prohibition	Clinton Bowen Fisk of New Jersey	John Anderson Brooks of Missouri	4,234	2.75%	0	0.00%
Union Labor	Alson Jenness Streeter of Illinois	Charles E. Cunningham of Arkansas	240	0.16%	0	0.00%
Total			153,978	100.00%	6	100.00%

== See also ==
- United States presidential elections in Connecticut
