= 1964 United States presidential election in Connecticut =

- November 3, 1964
- Turnout: 89.77%

Nominee	Lyndon B. Johnson	Barry Goldwater
Party	Democratic	Republican
Home state	Texas	Arizona
Running mate	Hubert Humphrey	William E. Miller
Electoral vote	8	0
Popular vote	826,269	390,996
Percentage	67.81%	32.09%

Johnson
50–60%
60–70%
70–80%
80–90%
Goldwater
50–60%
60–70%
President before election
Lyndon B. Johnson
Democratic
Elected President
Lyndon B. Johnson
Democratic

The 1964 United States presidential election in Connecticut took place on November 3, 1964, as part of the 1964 United States presidential election, which was held throughout all 50 states and D.C. Voters chose eight representatives, or electors to the Electoral College, who voted for president and vice president.

Connecticut voted overwhelmingly for the Democratic nominee, incumbent President Lyndon B. Johnson of Texas, over the Republican nominee, Senator Barry Goldwater of Arizona. Johnson ran with Senator Hubert H. Humphrey of Minnesota, while Goldwater's running mate was Congressman William E. Miller of New York.

Johnson carried Connecticut by a wide margin of 35.72%. His 67.81% vote share is the largest for a Democrat in Connecticut presidential election history, and the largest for any party since John Quincy Adams in 1828. He was the first Democrat to win every county since 1852.

To date, this is the last time that the city of Shelton and the towns of Bethlehem, Goshen, Harwinton, Middlebury, New Fairfield, Oxford, and Somers voted Democratic.

In addition, this election marks the last time that any presidential candidate won more than 70% in any Connecticut county.

== Results ==
1964 United States presidential election in Connecticut
Party	Candidate	Votes	Percentage	Electoral votes
Democratic	Lyndon B. Johnson (incumbent)	826,269	67.81%	8
Republican	Barry Goldwater	390,996	32.09%	0
Write-ins	Write-ins	1,313	0.11%	0
Totals		1,218,578	100.00%	8

=== By county ===
County	Lyndon B. Johnson Democratic		Barry Goldwater Republican		Write-in		Margin		Total votes cast
County	#	%	#	%	#	%	#	%	Total votes cast
Fairfield	194,782	60.75%	125,576	39.17%	261	0.08%	69,206	21.58%	320,619
Hartford	240,071	72.86%	88,811	26.95%	622	0.19%	151,260	45.91%	329,504
Litchfield	40,172	65.78%	20,834	34.12%	62	0.10%	19,338	31.66%	61,068
Middlesex	30,517	67.39%	14,697	32.45%	71	0.16%	15,820	34.94%	45,285
New Haven	218,743	69.10%	97,656	30.85%	171	0.05%	121,087	38.25%	316,570
New London	54,551	69.06%	24,391	30.88%	49	0.06%	30,160	38.18%	78,991
Tolland	22,195	68.92%	9,951	30.90%	58	0.18%	12,244	38.02%	32,204
Windham	25,238	73.50%	9,080	26.44%	19	0.06%	16,158	47.06%	34,337
Totals	826,269	67.81%	390,996	32.09%	1,313	0.10%	435,273	35.72%	1,218,578

==== Counties that flipped from Republican to Democratic ====
- Fairfield
- Litchfield
- Tolland

== See also ==
- United States presidential elections in Connecticut
