= Connecticut Route 157 =

State highway in Middlesex County, Connecticut, US

Route 157
- Map of Middlesex County in southern Connecticut with Route 157 highlighted in red

Route information
- Maintained by CTDOT
- Length: 6.86 mi (11.04 km)
- Existed: 1932–present

Major junctions
- South end: Route 68 in Durham
- North end: Route 66 in Middletown

Location
- Country: United States
- State: Connecticut
- Counties: Middlesex

Highway system
- Connecticut State Highway System; Interstate; US; State; SSR; SR; Scenic
← Route 156	→ Route 159

Route 157 is a state highway in central Connecticut from northwestern Durham, through Middlefield to Middletown.

== Route description ==
Route 157 begins as Skeet Club Road at an intersection with Route 68 in the northwestern corner of Durham. It heads northeast for about a mile into the town of Middlefield, becoming Redds gap Road and passing by Lyman Orchards. It then turns left and begins a 0.7-mile (1.1 km) overlap with Route 147 (Main Street) heading north. After leaving the overlap, it continues northeast into Middlefield center following the Coginchaug River. The road continues through the village of Rockfall before entering the city of Middletown. In Middletown, it continues northeast following the Coginchaug using Forest Street, Middlefield Street, and West Street, before ending at an intersection with Route 66 in the Newfield section of Middletown.

== History ==
The route between Middlefield center and Middletown through the village of Rockfall was designated as a primary state highway in 1922, and was known as State Highway 199. In the 1932 state highway renumbering, Route 157 was created from the entire length of old Highway 199 and the southern portion of an old secondary route, Highway 330 (modern Route 147), establishing a route from Durham via Middlefield to Middletown. In 1966, the Durham to Middlefield section was assigned to Route 147. At the same time, Route 157 was extended south along former SR 599 to a newly extended Route 68, resulting in the current routes.

== Junction list ==
The entire route is in Middlesex County.

Location	mi	km	Destinations	Notes
Durham	0.00	0.00	Route 68 – Wallingford, Durham Center	Southern terminus
Middlefield	1.96	3.15	Route 147 south – Durham	Southern end of Route 147 concurrency
Middlefield	2.65	4.26	Route 147 north – Meriden	Northern end of Route 147 concurrency
Middletown	6.86	11.04	Route 66 – Meriden, Portland	Northern terminus
1.000 mi = 1.609 km; 1.000 km = 0.621 mi: Concurrency terminus
