= Coginchaug =

Area in Connecticut, United States

Coordinates: 41.47°N 72.69°W

Coginchaug is an area within the current United States town of Durham, Connecticut. It is largely a swampy, low-lying region of the town, drained by the Coginchaug River and its tributaries.

== History ==
Historically, it was the Native American name of the area used by the Mattabesset tribe for hunting. It is said to have meant "Great Swamp" or "Long Swamp."

According to William Chauncey Fowler's History of Durham, land in the Coginchaug area was deeded to John Talcott in 1662. A subsequent deed executed in 1672 documented the transfer of land known as "Cawginchaug" from Native proprietors to English settlers.

As the former name of Durham, Coginchaug has been reused by the Regional School District #13, encompassing Durham, Connecticut, and Middlefield, Connecticut, to label its jointly used high school Coginchaug Regional High School. The Coginchaug Soccer Club, Coginchaug Basketball Club, and Coginchaug Little League take their name from it as well.

== Etymology ==
The name Coginchaug is derived from an Algonquian language formerly spoken in central Connecticut. The name has been translated as "long swamp".

== Geography ==
Coginchaug is a low-lying area within the town of Durham, Connecticut. The region is largely swampy and is drained by the Coginchaug River and its tributaries.

== History ==
The area was historically frequented by the Mattabesset people, an Algonquian-speaking Native American group whose territory included portions of central Connecticut.

According to William Chauncey Fowler's History of Durham, Connecticut, land in the Coginchaug area was first granted by the Connecticut General Court to John Talcott in 1662.

In 1672, a deed known as the Deed of Cawginchaug from Tarramuggus, &c. documented the transfer of land known as "Cawginchaug" from Native proprietors to English settlers.

The area later became part of the town of Durham, which was originally known as Coginchaug before being incorporated as Durham in 1708.
