= Hidden Lake (Connecticut) =

Village in Connecticut, United States

Coordinates: 41.4222°N 72.5685°W

Hidden Lake is one of five villages located within Haddam, Connecticut, United States. It is governed by the bylaws of the Hidden Lake Association.

Hidden Lake is located on the Haddam USGS quad topological map. The latitude and longitude coordinates for the lake are 41.4220, -72.5687 and the altitude is 515 feet (157 meters).

== Hidden Lake development ==
In 1929, Wilbur Lewis of West Haven, Connecticut purchased property from farmers and local residents including the Wilcox and Brooks families, just north of the Killingworth border along what is now Route 81. Lewis' original plan was to build a boys’ camp. However, he decided instead to build the Hidden Lake development; 140 lots surrounding the man-made Hidden lake.

Automobile travel had exploded in the 1930s; families could go to the lake for the summer season. The wives and children would stay for the week while the husbands came on weekends or commuted directly from work. Similar lake communities were built throughout the state in the late 1920s and the early 1930s. These lake communities included Lake Beseck in Middlefield, Lake Hayward in Colchester, and Candlewood Lake in the western part of the state. The Hidden Lake development, billed as one of Connecticut's finest lake developments, offered city dwellers from Hartford, Meriden, and New Britain a seasonal summer or weekend retreat.

The Hidden Lake Realty Company, Inc. advertised that all the lots were 50 X 100 feet or larger. “Why not join the crowds at Hidden Lake” reads the advertisement from June 1929. With a $20 down payment and $5 per month, an individual could purchase a “Cottage Site” within 300 feet of the shore. Waterfront lots went for $700. Lewis reportedly named all the village streets, including Shore Drive, East Shore Drive, and West Shore Drive. There is a First, Second, and Third Avenue along with Lakeview Road, Beach Road, and Lake Point Road. Lewis erected a log cabin home for himself in the development.

Lewis build a village clubhouse on Shore Drive for dances, socials, and fundraisers. Bingo and card games were played and any money earned helped support the Hidden Lake Association. The clubhouse had a stage and country music star Slim Cox used to play at square dances. There was also a Hidden Lake Fish and Game Club. Lewis also converted a former button factory near the dam into a village store.

== Hidden Lake Association ==
In 1937, the Hidden Lake Association was incorporated. Its mission was to “provide for the improvements of the land in said territory and for the health, comfort, protection, and convenience of the inhabitants." Lewis deeded all the village streets, beaches, and the lake itself to the organization.

Original deeds noted that village residents had the right to use the lake for boating, bathing, fishing, and recreational purposes. The Association also set strict building regulations in terms of cottage locations, roofs, and siding materials. Association dues were originally $5 for a house and $2 for a lot annually. The village had no electricity until 1939–40. Prior to then, many homes used car storage batteries that were charged by car generators or wind chargers.

== Current status ==
After World War II, many cottages in the village were converted to year-round residences. The clubhouse was eventually leveled and a private home was built on the site.

Today, fewer than 5% of the dwellings are seasonal homes. Residents range from young families to retirees who enjoy ice skating and ice fishing in the winter and swimming and boating in the summer.

The Hidden Lake Association is responsible for the paving, maintenance and plowing of village roads; and the upkeep and protection of the lake and the dam. The board. composed of Association, meets monthly. Only Association members can use the recreational facilities of the lake. Residents now pay taxes to the Lake Association and to the Town of Haddam.

== The Lake ==
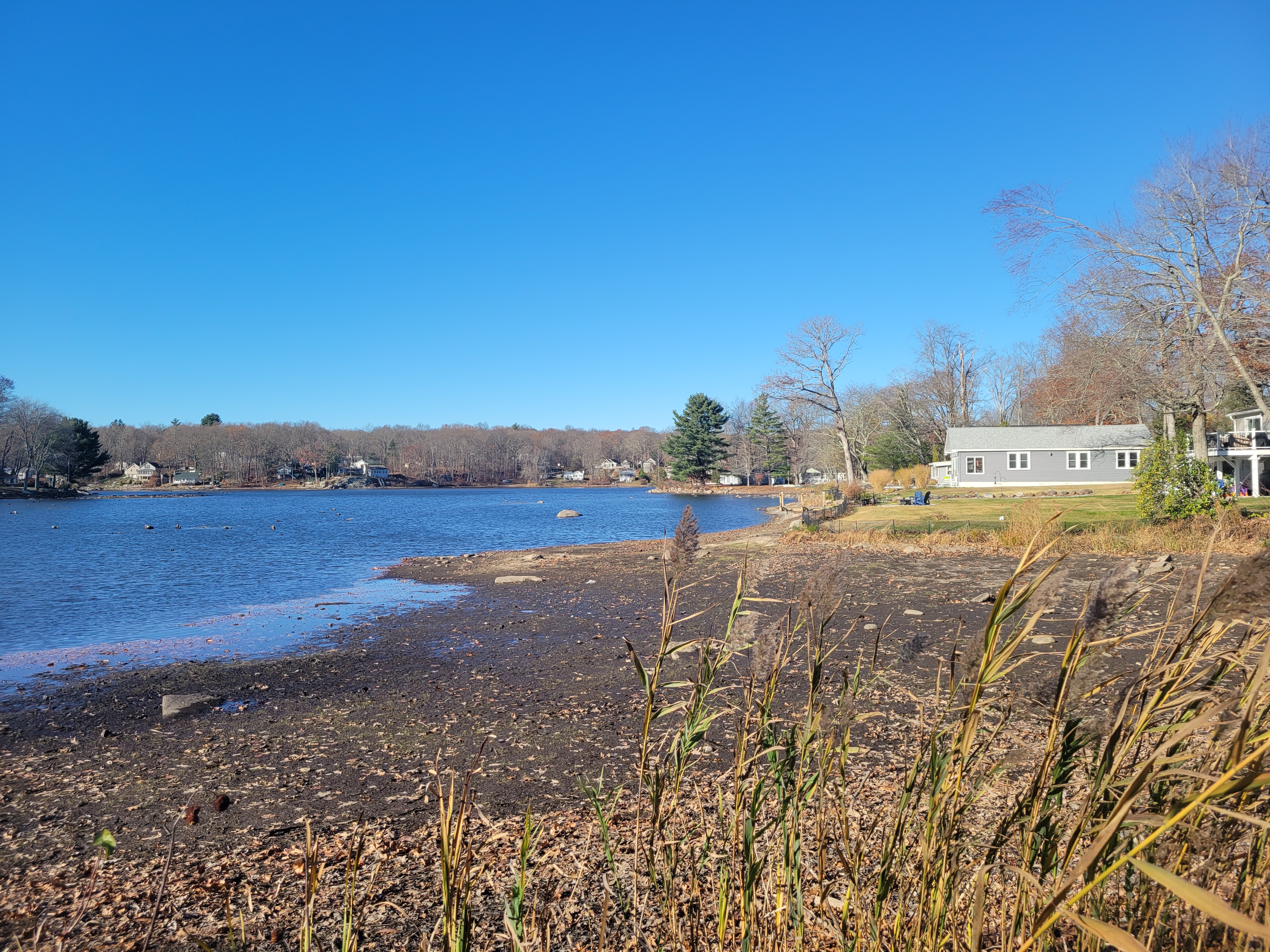
Hidden Lake

The lake is fed by a stream from the north and several springs in the lake bed. The lake is dammed at the south side and feeds into the cranberry bogs in Killingworth, Connecticut. The 40-acre Hidden Lake includes a North Cove, South Cove, West Cove, and Mill Bay. Lake fishing for bass and pickerel in a catch and release program is allowed. Ducks, osprey, Canada geese, buffleheads, mergansers, and an occasional loon are seen on the lake. The lake depth ranges from three to eight feet.

The Board monitors the water quality of Hidden Lake during the summer months; water samples are submitted to the State of Connecticut Labs on a regular basis. In 2009, the Board began a program to monitor and control the lake vegetation and improve conditions for swimming, fishing, and boating. Motor boats are prohibited on the lake. It is part of the Connecticut Water Trails.
