= Wadsworth Falls State Park =

State park in Connecticut, United States

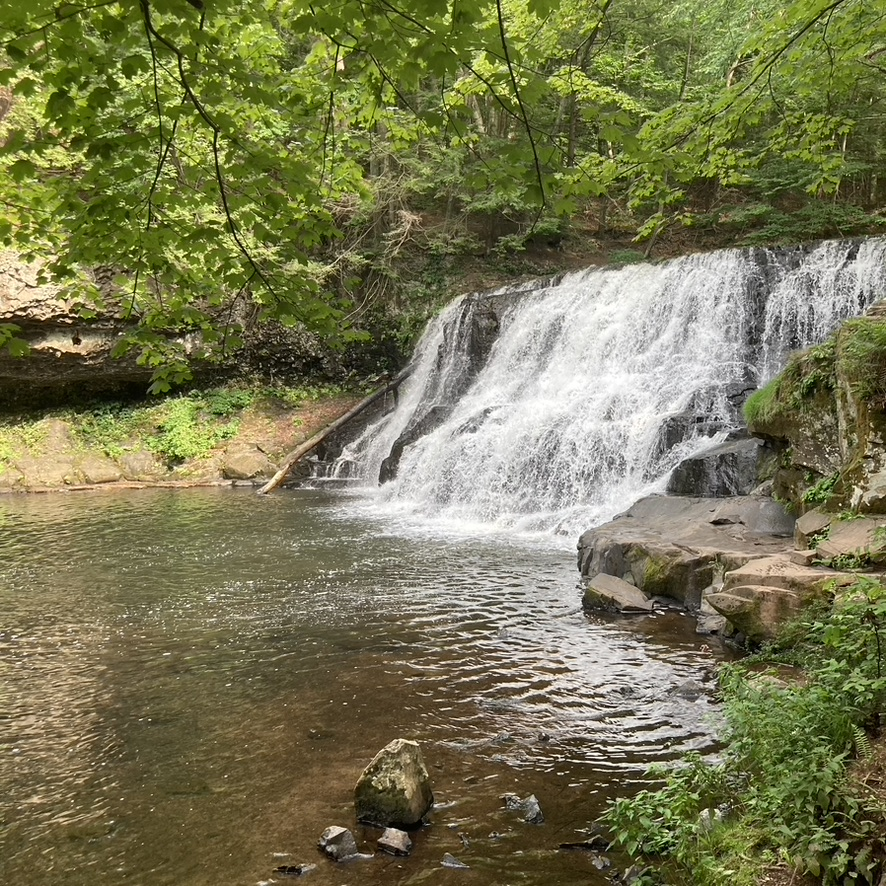

- Location within Connecticut Location within the United States
- Location: Middlefield and Middletown, Connecticut, United States
- Coordinates: 41°31′32″N 72°41′47″W
- Area: 285 acres (115 ha)
- Elevation: 135 ft (41 m)
- Established: 1942
- Administrator: Connecticut Department of Energy and Environmental Protection
- Designation: Connecticut state park
- Named for: Clarence C. Wadsworth
- Website: Official website
- Wadsworth Falls State Park
- U.S. National Register of Historic Places
- U.S. Historic district – Contributing property
- Part of: Wadsworth Estate Historic District
- NRHP reference No.: 96000775
- Added to NRHP: July 25, 1996

Wadsworth Falls State Park, or simply Wadsworth Falls, is a public recreation and preserved natural area located on the Coginchaug River in the towns of Middletown and Middlefield, Connecticut. The state park's 285 acres (115 ha) offer trail hiking, fishing, swimming and picnicking. It is managed by the Connecticut Department of Energy and Environmental Protection.

== History ==
The park bears the name of Colonel Clarence S. Wadsworth (1871–1941), an academic, linguist, conservationist, and member of the New York National Guard. Wadsworth developed the property that the park occupies in the early years of the 20th century as part of his Long Hill estate. He established the Rockfall Corporation as a charitable foundation to administer his properties and further his conservationist interests. Following his death, the corporation gave 267 acres (108 ha) of Wadsworth's estate to the people of Connecticut for preservation as Wadsworth Falls State Park.

In 1996, the portion of the park that lies within the town of Middletown, some 130 acres, was added to the National Register of Historic Places as part of the Wadsworth Estate Historic District. The district's central feature, the Wadsworth Mansion at Long Hill, lies adjacent to the park and may be reached from the park by way of the purple-blazed hiking trail.

== Waterfalls ==
Two natural waterfalls lie within easy reach by park trails: the Big Falls, on the Coginchaug River, and the Little Falls, on Wadsworth Brook. The larger of the two, Wadsworth Big Falls, drops the 52-foot breadth of the Coginchaug River some 30 feet (9.1 m) over a shelf of Hampden basalt. Wadsworth Little Falls is found along Wadsworth Brook and descends approximately 40 feet (12 m) over an outcrop of sandstone known as Portland arkose.

== See also ==
- List of waterfalls
