= Julia Cox Bryant =

American educator

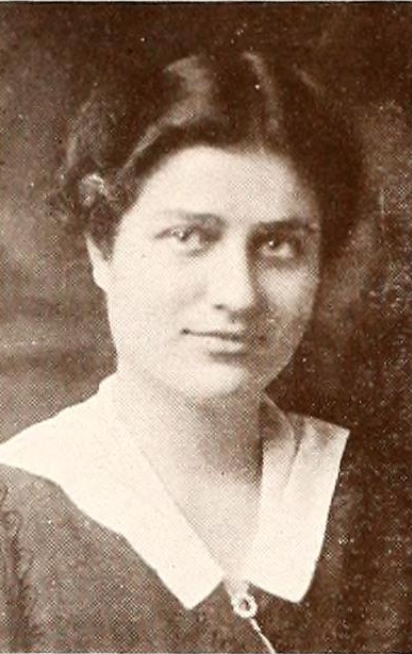
- Julia Cox Bryant, from the 1917 yearbook of Vassar College
- Born: June 25, 1893; Cohasset, Massachusetts, U.S.
- Died: May 21, 1967 (age 73); Durham, Connecticut, U.S.
- Occupation(s): Educator, philanthropist, musician

Julia Cox Bryant (June 25, 1893 – May 21, 1967) was an American educator, musician, philanthropist, and "eccentric". She was from a prominent New England family and an alumna of Vassar College, Oberlin Conservatory of Music, and Radcliffe College. She was a preschool teacher in Durham, Connecticut, for many years before her murder in 1967. A memorial fund in her name supports musical events and education in Durham.

== Early life and education ==
Bryant was born in Cohasset, Massachusetts, the daughter of William Sohier Bryant and Martha Lyman Cox Bryant. Her father was a Harvard-trained surgeon and ear specialist, who was a veteran of the Spanish–American War and World War I. Her brother-in-law Fessenden Blanchard was a noted platform tennis player.

She graduated from Vassar College in 1917. She earned a degree in music from the Oberlin Conservatory of Music in 1920, and earned a master's degree at Radcliffe College in 1924. She was a member of Phi Beta Kappa.

== Career ==
Bryant taught music at Denison University in 1921 and 1922, after completing her Oberlin Conservatory degree. She commuted by horseback when she taught school in Kentucky. She taught school in Concord, Massachusetts, and was the first teacher at the Durham Co-operative Nursery School in Connecticut. She encouraged nature study in her students, taking children for long walks or driving them on field trips to study plants and wildlife. As a tribute in 1965, the Durham Cooperative Nursery-Kindergarten Association held a tea in Bryant's honor, and presented her with a typewriter and "a scholarship which she may personally award to a child entering kindergarten."

Bryant was a skilled musician and a member of the American Guild of Organists. She played piano at a meeting at Harvard University in 1924.

== Personal life ==
Bryant supported several foster sons, and took some of them on a 900-mile bicycle trip in Europe. She took a teenaged niece on a cross-country road trip.

Bryant was attacked and killed in her bed in 1967, at the age of 73, in her Durham, Connecticut, home. One of her foster sons was charged but acquitted in the case, which remained unsolved as of 2025. Bryant's grand-niece Leslie Ware wrote a biography of her, Dear Miss Bryant: The Life and Murder of a Remarkable Eccentric (2021). The Julia C. Bryant Memorial Fund sponsored local concerts, and supported Coginchaug Regional High School music students with scholarships and instrument purchases, into the 21st century.
