= Thomas Lyman House =

Historic house in Connecticut, United States

- U.S. National Register of Historic Places
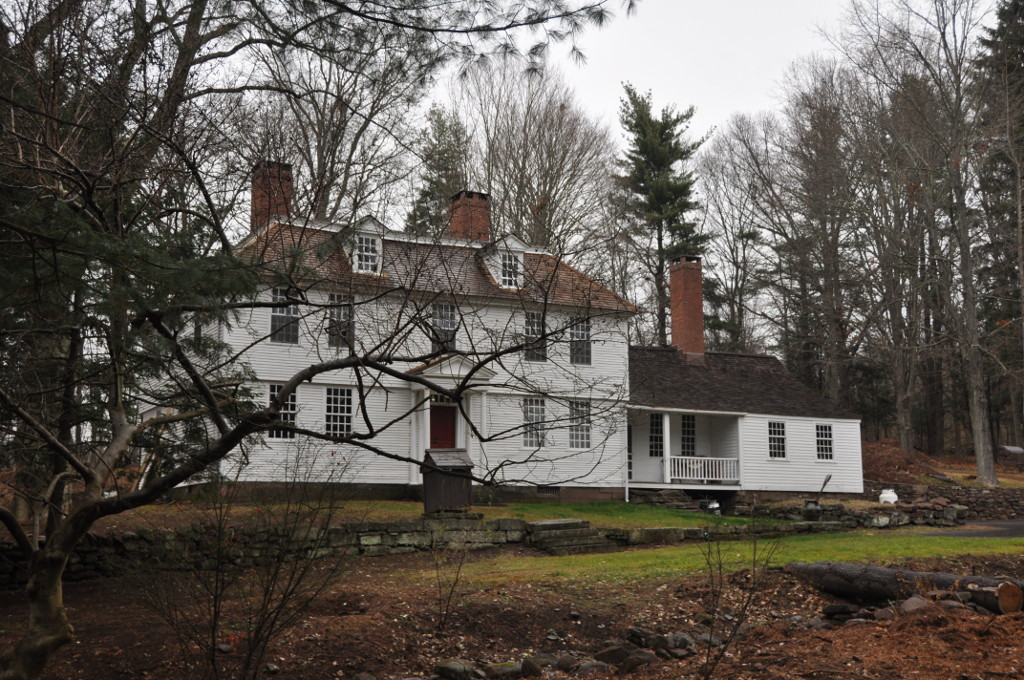

- Location within Connecticut Location within the United States
- Location: 105 Middlefield Road, Durham, Connecticut
- Coordinates: 41°29′18″N 72°41′16″W
- Area: 1 acre (0.40 ha)
- Built: c. 1774
- Architect: Thomas Lyman IV
- NRHP reference No.: 75001921
- Added to NRHP: November 20, 1975

The Thomas Lyman House is a historic house at 105 Middlefield Road in Durham, Connecticut. Built about 1774, it is a well-preserved example of late Colonial architecture, regionally unusual for its hip roof. The 1-acre (0.40 ha) property was listed on the National Register of Historic Places in 1975.

== Description and history ==
The Thomas Lyman House is located in a rural setting northwest of Durham center, on the east side of Middlefield Road (Connecticut Route 147) just north of a stream crossing. It is a 2 1/2-story wood-frame structure, with two chimneys, a hip roof and two front dormers, and is oriented facing south. The front entry is sheltered by a small Doric-columned porch. A 1 1/2-story ell extends to the east, covered by a bellcast gabled roof. Windows are twelve-over-twelve sash, and the second story has a slight overhang over the first. The interior follows a typical colonial-era central hall plan.

The house was built c. 1774 by Thomas Lyman IV on land purchased by his father in 1709. It is locally unusual for its hip roof, which is not normally found on houses of the period. Lyman, a veteran of the American Revolutionary War, is said to have been friends with Thomas Jefferson and to have entertained Lafayette in this house several times. He was also active in civic affairs, serving on a state constitutional convention in 1830. After his death, the house passed through several generations of Lyman descendants.

== See also ==
- National Register of Historic Places listings in Middlesex County, Connecticut
