= Wadsworth Mansion =

Wadsworth Mansion may refer to:

- Wadsworth Mansion at Long Hill, Connecticut, USA
- Wadsworth Mansion (band), a rock band
