= Durham (CDP), Connecticut =

Census-designated place in Connecticut, United States

Durham, Connecticut
- Census-designated place
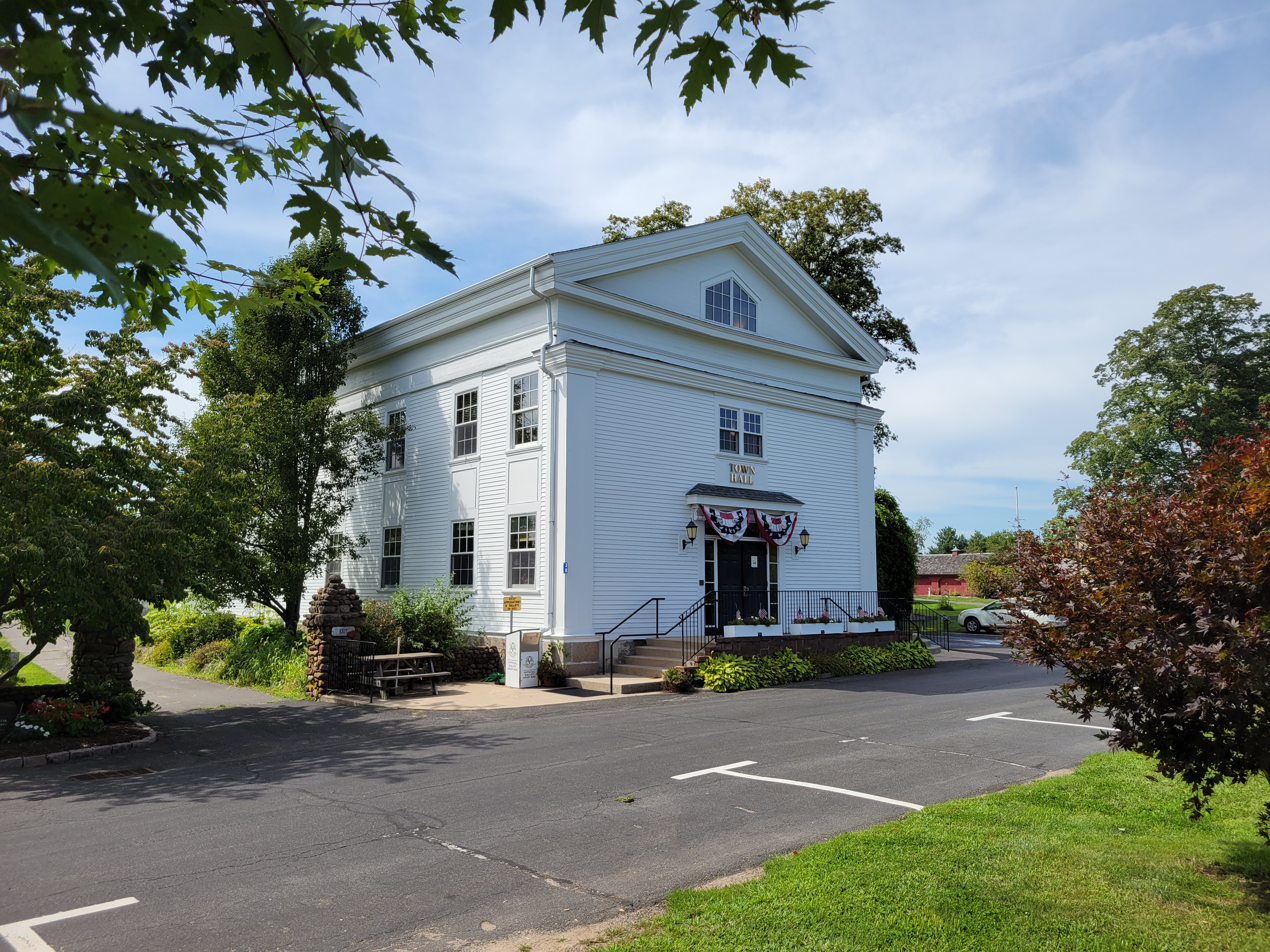
- Town Hall

- Location within Connecticut Location within the United States
- Coordinates: 41°28′40″N 72°40′51″W
- Country: United States
- State: Connecticut
- County: Middlesex
- Town: Durham

Area
  - Total: 8.25 sq mi (21.37 km^{2})
  - Land: 8.25 sq mi (21.36 km^{2})
  - Water: 0.0039 sq mi (0.01 km^{2})
- Elevation: 239 ft (73 m)

Population (2020)
  - Total: 3,771
  - Density: 457/sq mi (176.5/km^{2})
- Time zone: UTC-5 (Eastern (EST))
  - Summer (DST): UTC-4 (EDT)
- ZIP Code: 06422
- Area codes: 860/959
- FIPS code: 09-20740
- GNIS feature ID: 2377815

Durham is a census-designated place (CDP) comprising the primary village and surrounding development in the town of Durham, Middlesex County, Connecticut, United States. It is in the central and northeastern portions of the town, bordered to the north by the town of Middlefield and the city of Middletown. As of the 2020 census, the CDP had a population of 3,771, out of 7,152 in the entire town of Durham.

== Historic District ==
The Main Street Historic District occupies 160 acres (0.65 km^{2}) at the center of the community.
