= Harriet Cooper Lane House =

Historic house in Connecticut, United States

Coordinates: 41.5369°N 72.6783°W

- Interactive map of the Harriet Cooper Lane House area

General information
- Location: 30 Laurel Grove Road, Middletown, Connecticut
- Year built: 1741

Technical details
- Material: Clapboard and Brownstone Foundation with Wood shingle roof

The Harriet Cooper Lane House is a historic building in Middletown, Connecticut.

== Relationship to surroundings ==
This center-chimney Colonial house faces west from the east side of Laurel Grove Road near the intersection of Wadsworth Street. It is set back behind a yard with a stone wall bordering the property near the road. Across the street is the Nehemiah Hubbard House (c. 1730). Laurel Grove Road is an unpaved lane with tall shading scattered residences.

== Significance ==
This house originally stood on the Main Street of Durham, Connecticut near the site of the Durham Manufacturing Company. It was probably built around 1741 by Robert Smithson. In 1957 it was moved to its present site. It is remembered in Durham as the Harriet Cooper Lane House after a long-term former occupant.

This house displays the center-chimney, two-room deep plan typical of mid-18th-century hose construction. In its well-preserved condition it complements the Nehemiah Hubbard House across the street. Together these two houses make the entrance into Laurel Grove Road a pleasing streetscape reminiscent of the 18th century.

The house is still a residential home. On March 27, 2021, a fire occurred at this house. Significant damage occurred.
