= Mattabesset River =

River in the U.S. state of Connecticut

Coordinates: 41.57315°N 72.65148°W

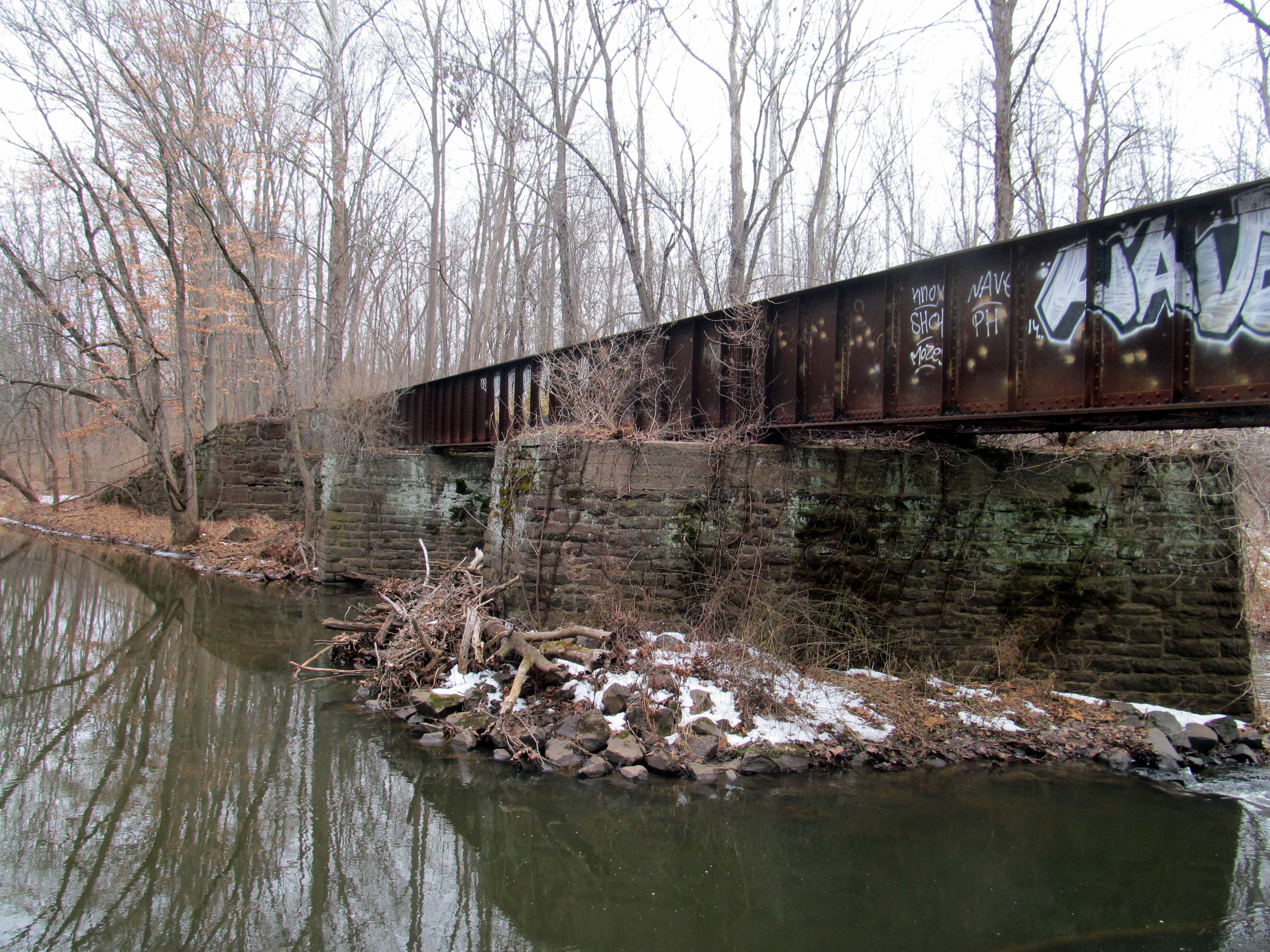
A railroad bridge which formerly carried the New Haven Railroad's Middletown Branch over the Mattabesset River between Middletown and Cromwell.

The Mattabesset River as delineated on present-day maps flows out of Harts Ponds in the town of Berlin and travels 16.1 miles (25.9 km) east to the Connecticut River, passing Kensington and later forming the boundary between Middletown and Cromwell.

Further south, the Coginchaug River (or "winding meadow") flows from an upland meadow in Durham, northwards to the Mattabesset just upstream of that river's junction with the Connecticut. This river was the route to the portage place, located near Palmer Field, just below Sowheag's main stronghold at Indian Hill. Since it was the old western boundary of the incorporated City of Middletown, it was also called the West River, and also, for no known reasons, it was given other names, including the Sebethe River and the Arrawanna River. Presumably the word Mattabeseck was never considered properly euphonious, and various local individuals tried to improve on the name poetically.

== See also ==
- List of rivers of Connecticut
