= Clarence S. Wadsworth =

Philanthropist from Connecticut (1871–1941)

Clarence Seymour Wadsworth (August 29, 1871 – April 7, 1941) was a businessman and philanthropist.

Born in New York City in 1871, the son of Julius Wadsworth and Cornelia De Koven, Clarence Wadsworth served Middletown, Connecticut as a member of the town Park Board and the Planning Commission, and served in the Connecticut General Assembly as a Senator from the 33rd District. As an active conservationist, he developed the parkland adjoining Long Hill Estate parkland and an arboretum of northeast forest trees bordering Long Lane. He is notable for building the Wadsworth Mansion at Long Hill and donating the land to create Wadsworth Falls State Park.

He died on April 7, 1941 in Montreal, Quebec, Canada, aged 69.
