= Wadsworth Mansion at Long Hill =

Historic house in Connecticut, United States

- Wadsworth Estate Historic District
- U.S. National Register of Historic Places
- U.S. Historic district
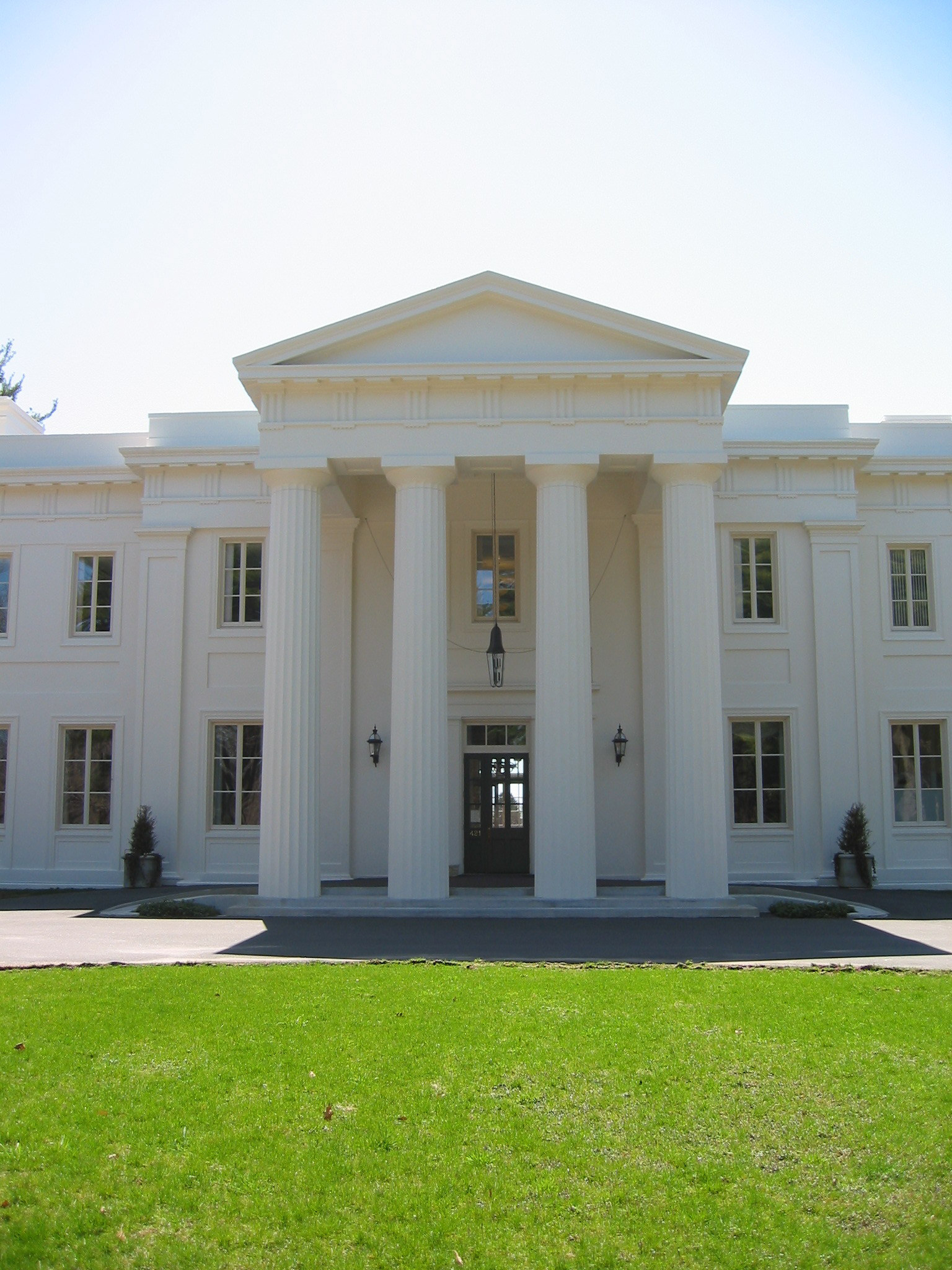
- Wadsworth Mansion Front Elevation

- Location within Connecticut Location within the United States
- Location: 15, 30, 33, 59, 73, 89 Laurel Grove Road, Wadsworth Falls State Park, and 421 Wadsworth Street, Middletown, Connecticut
- Coordinates: 41.5433°N 72.6742°W
- Area: 270 acres (1.1 km^{2})
- Built: 1900, 1909 and 1917
- Architect: Hoppin, Francis L.V.; Olmsted, John C.
- Architectural style: Colonial Revival
- Website: www.wadsworthmansion.com
- NRHP reference No.: 96000775
- Added to NRHP: July 25, 1996

The Wadsworth Mansion at Long Hill Estate is located at 421 Wadsworth Street in Middletown, Connecticut. It is a 16,000-square-foot (1,500 m^{2}) classical revival house situated on 103 acres (0.42 km^{2}) wooded area. It is currently owned by the City of Middletown and is operated by the Long Hill Estate Authority. The mansion is the centerpiece of the Wadsworth Estate Historic District of 270 acres (1.1 km^{2}), which includes the mansion's associated outbuildings, the Middletown portion of Wadsworth Falls State Park, the Nehemiah Hubbard House, and several barns and farmhouses along Laurel Grove Road such as the Harriet Cooper Lane House.

== History ==
From its formal classical nucleus to the naturalized wilderness of its forest, literally every square foot of the estate was shaped by the ideas of Colonel Clarence S. Wadsworth and his architects. After marrying Katharine Fearing Hubbard, Col. Wadsworth began amassing land in the western part of Middletown that would eventually become his 600-acre (2.4 km^{2}) estate. Starting in 1900, thousands of trees and shrubs were planted to change pastures and orchards into a naturalistic woodland setting around the mansion. Dense nursery plantations were established and mature specimen trees were planted. Some pasturage was left in its natural state and open areas were set aside for a lawn tennis court, the great lawn south of the mansion, and formal gardens. John Charles Olmsted played a major role in the design of the estate. The full extent of Olmsted's influence on the final design is not really known, but the firm's well known approach to landscape is evident.

The mansion's architect was Francis Hoppin, who was classically trained at Brown University, M.I.T., and the Ecole des Beaux-Arts in Paris. He became known for his country estates, most notably The Mount, Edith Wharton’s 1902 home in Lenox, Massachusetts. The contract for the house was let to the Dennis O’Brien Construction company, a Middletown firm, at a cost of $90,000.00, a considerable sum even then. The use of reinforced structural concrete and fireproofing, considered a relatively new technology at the time, had rarely been used in residential buildings. Construction of the house began in 1908 and was ‘completed’ around 1911.

The Wadsworth family was in residence at Long Hill in the spring and fall, but maintained homes in New York, Palm Beach, Bar Harbor, Chicago, and Bermuda. The Colonel died in 1941, bequeathing the estate to the Rockfall Corporation, a philanthropic, non-profit organization he established in 1935, devoted to the establishment and preservation of woodlands, wild lands, and open space. In 1942 the Rockfall Foundation honored his wishes by giving 267 acres (1.1 km^{2}) on the west side of Laurel Grove Road to the State of Connecticut to become Wadsworth Falls State Park. The Wadsworth family maintained Long Hill until 1947, when it was sold to Our Lady of the Cenacle, a Roman Catholic religious institute who used it as a retreat center for 40 years. During that time the house was expanded and the land was subdivided. After being sold to a developer in 1986, the estate was resold to another developer who planned to subdivide it into housing lots. His plans failed and he filed for bankruptcy in 1988. The bank that repossessed the estate did not adequately secure the building and it was not long before vandals, satanic worshippers, and homeless people frequented the house. In 1990 a fire was started in the East Ballroom that nearly destroyed the house. The heat was so intense that the steel used in the west side of the house punctured through the concrete. Had the Colonel not used reinforced concrete the structure would not have survived.

In 1994 the City of Middletown purchased the estate and the remaining 103 acres (0.4 km^{2}) for $1,000,000.00. Over the next two years the city evaluated and developed plans to restore the building and grounds. On June 25, 1996, the residents of Middletown approved a referendum for bond funding to rehabilitate the buildings and landscape. The project architect was David Scott Parker of Southport, Connecticut. The construction contractor was Kronenberger and Sons Restoration, a Middletown company specializing in the restoration of old structures. Due to unforeseen work, the costs of the rehabilitation were greater than budgeted, and the citizens approved additional bond funding in 1999. On December 30, 1999, the building received a Certificate of Occupancy just in time to open for a millennium wedding celebration. Over $5.6 million had been expended to restore the mansion.

The public can take guided tours of the mansion on Wednesday afternoons. The grounds and trails are open daily.

== See also ==
- National Register of Historic Places listings in Middletown, Connecticut
