= Coginchaug Regional High School =

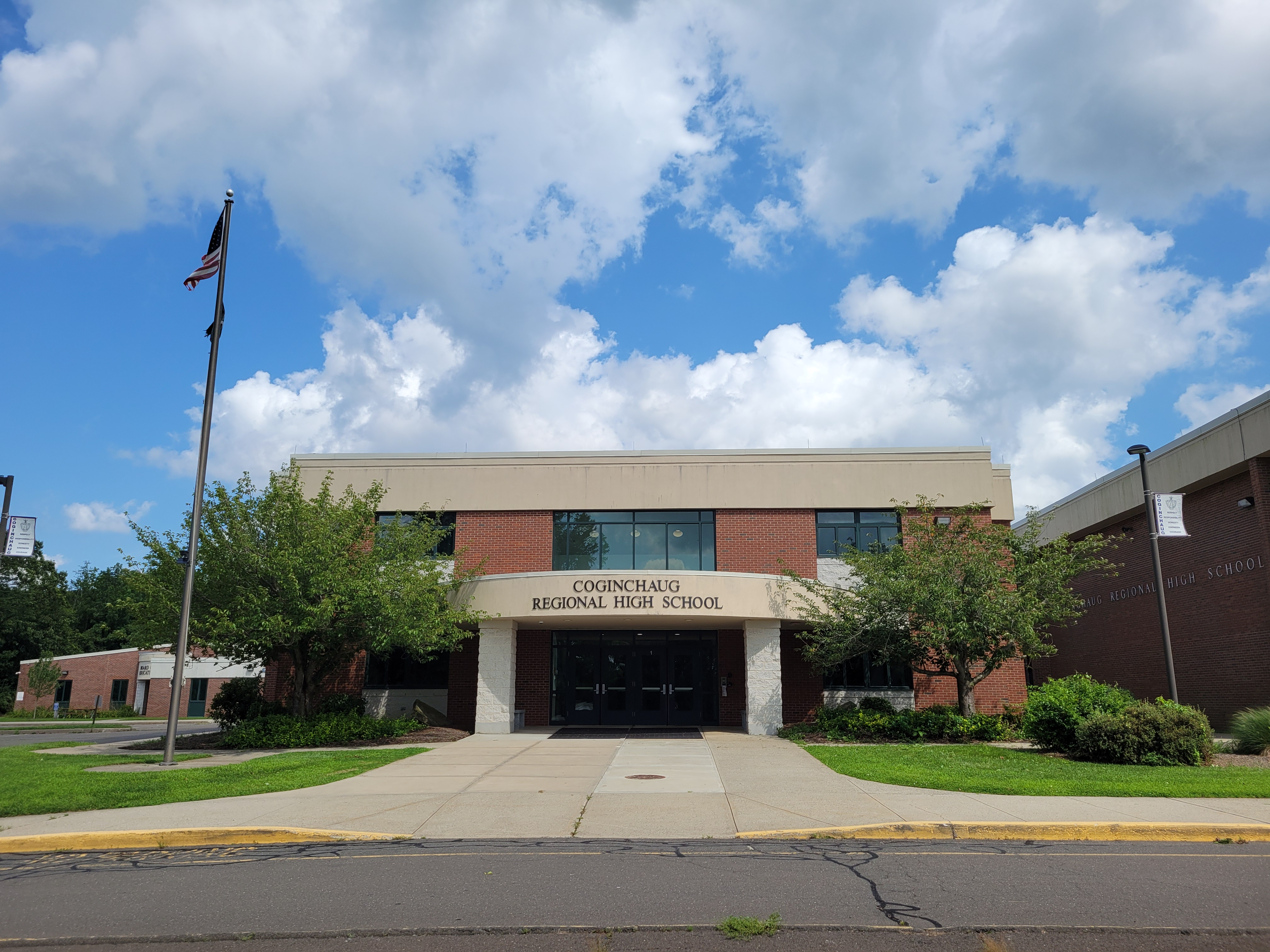
- Coginchaug Regional High School

Location
- 135 Pickett Lane; Durham, Connecticut 06422; United States; 41°28′37″N 72°40′10″W

Information
- Type: Public
- School district: Regional School District #13
- CEEB code: 070160
- Principal: Deborah Stone
- Teaching staff: 38.40 (on FTE basis)
- Grades: 9 to 12
- Enrollment: 359 (2023-2024)
- Student to teacher ratio: 9.35
- Colors: Blue and white
- Athletics conference: CIAC Shoreline Conference
- Mascot: Blue Devils
- Nickname: C.R.H.S.
- Website: crhs.rsd13ct.org

Coginchaug Regional High School (abbreviated as C.R.H.S.) is a public high school located in Durham, Connecticut and is named after the Coginchaug River. It is part of Regional School District #13, which encompasses the communities of Durham, Middlefield and Rockfall, Connecticut. Coginchaug is attended by students in grades 9 through 12.

This map shows the incorporated and unincorporated areas of Connecticut's Middlesex County, with Durham highlighted in red.

== Principal ==
The principal of Coginchaug Regional High School is Debra Stone as of the 2022–2023 school year.

== Academics ==
A variety of academic programs and coursework are offered at Coginchaug, including special education, standard high school classes at three levels (Honors, College Prep A, and College Prep B), and Advanced Placement classes.

== Extracurricular ==
=== Newspaper ===
The student newspaper is The Devil's Advocate, which is published on a biweekly basis as part of The Town Times, the local newspaper of Durham and Middlefield.

=== Sports ===
Coginchaug offers a wide range of sports and extracurricular activities, including; cross country, indoor and outdoor track, basketball, soccer, football (co-op with East Hampton and Hale-Ray), volleyball, golf, tennis, baseball, softball, ice hockey (boys co-op with Haddam-Killingworth Regional and Lyman Hall in Wallingford; plays home games at Northford Ice Pavilion), swimming and diving (co-op with Lyman Hall, meets held at Sheehan HS in Wallingford), and also offers a Unified Sports program

The school's mascot is the Blue Devil, and the school's colors are blue and white.

==== State championships ====
Coginchaug Regional High School has won the following state championships (class S unless otherwise noted):

- girls' basketball: 2012 and 2018
- softball: 1983, 1994, 1995, 1997, 1998, 1999, 2002, 2005, 2006, 2008, 2012 and 2021
- baseball: 1972 and 2021
- girls cross country (Class SS): 1998, 1999, 2000, 2001, and 2014
- boys cross country: 2001
- girls outdoor track: 1999, 2000, 2001, and 2002
- boys outdoor track: 1997, 2000, and 2003
- girls indoor track: 1999
- boys indoor track: 1969, 1970, 1973, 1974
- boys tennis: 1999
- boys basketball: 1974
- ice hockey (Class III, shared title): 2019
