= Powder Ridge Ski Area =

Ski area located in Middlefield, Connecticut

Powder Ridge Park
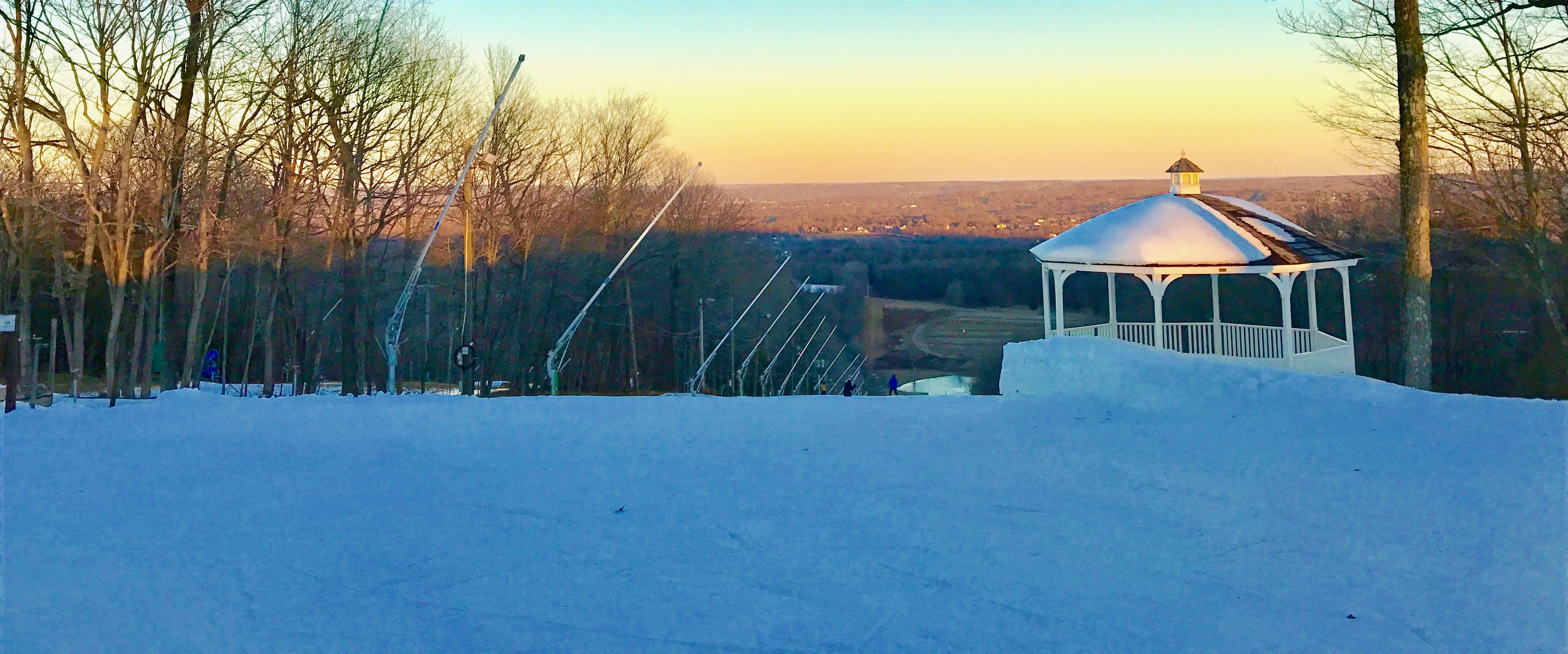
- View downhill from the Middlefield ski slope at sunset in Powder Ridge Mountain Park and Resort.
- Interactive map of Powder Ridge Park
- Location: Besek Mountain
- Nearest city: Middlefield, Connecticut
- Coordinates: 41.502006°N 72.737172°W
- Vertical: 417 ft (127 m)
- Skiable area: 80 acres (32 ha)
- Trails: 20
- Snowfall: 60 inches (150 cm)
- Website: powderridgepark.com

Powder Ridge Ski Area is a ski area located in Middlefield, Connecticut, United States. It began operations on January 22, 1961, closed in 2007, and reopened in 2013 as Powder Ridge Mountain Park & Resort. It is located on Besek Mountain. Powder Ridge Park is affiliated with the Brownstone Exploration and Discovery Park in the Portland Brownstone Quarries in nearby Portland, Connecticut.

== History ==
Powder Ridge began operations in 1959 under the name of Powder Hill. It was started by brothers Louis and Herman Zemel, who had already operated a successful appliance store in New Haven, CT. It initially operated with only surface lifts, but constructed three new double chairs between 1963 and 1965. In 1970, the area changed its name to Powder Ridge; during the year, it was planned to host the Powder Ridge Rock Festival, which was later cancelled. The planners of the festival skipped town with the money, but thousands of young adults showed up at the ski area expecting a second Woodstock. Melanie Safka is the only performer who showed up and ignored the court injunction banning the festival (she performed on a stage powered by Mister Softee trucks).

1972, after resolution of local opposition and legal action, Powder Ridge embarked on a major expansion, which included the construction of the first quad chair in New England, dubbed the "747 lift." It was thus named for the slope it rode over, the 747, known to be one of the area's more difficult runs.

The Zemel brothers also started a business called Fan Jet that produced and sold snow making equipment. However, this enterprise was shut down after a patent infringement lawsuit in the mid-1980s.

When Louis Zemel died in 1981, his half of the business went to his children. His son and daughter-in-law took over the day-to-day management of the ski area and snow making business.

Powder Ridge operated in the off-season by running a pool club that offered an Olympic sized swimming pool, kiddie pool, and tennis courts for members. The restaurant also hosted corporate outings, family outings, and the like in the summer to supplement the winter business.

In the 1980s the ski area had a beginner slope that was 1/4 mile long, the Middlefield slope, running the full 1/2 mile length of the mountain and was perennially the first slope to open and the last to close each season, the Glade, which was a narrower run than the others and open less frequently, due to the lack of snow making, the 747, which sometimes had moguls near the top and was considered the more Difficult run, and finally, the Dinosaur, presumably named for the small park of dinosaur foot prints at one of the ski area's entrances.

The ski area offered night time skiing, keeping the slopes open to the early morning on Friday and Saturday nights.

The ski area partnered with Connecticut schools to host ski clubs.

In 1990, Powder Ridge was purchased by a company called White Water Mountain Resorts, which planned to build the ski area into a year-round resort. As noted above, it already did operate in the off-season, but some local citizens were concerned about the increased numbers of cars projected to run on the small country road.

In 2001, two chairlifts, the quad chair and a double chair were both converted to triples. At some point during the mid-2000s, White Water's plan to build a water park at Powder Ridge were denied by the town of Middlefield. White Water subsequently announced it would try to sell the ski area, and though the town initially agreed to purchase the Powder Ridge for $3.6 million and lease it to White Water, it later voted against the plan.

On 23 September 2006, it was announced that Powder Ridge would not operate during the winter of 2006-2007, a time when the ski area was more than $2.5 million in debt to TD Banknorth. While the ski area later chose to operate that winter, it would permanently close after the end of the 2006-2007 ski season. That spring, Middlefield voted once again to purchase Powder Ridge, but was unable to, and a private operator, Middlefield Holdings LLC, bought the ski area during summer 2008 for $2.75 million. On 29 December 2008, though, the town of Middlefield bought Powder Ridge, at a price of $2.55 million.

The town planned to sell Powder Ridge to a private company, and in 2009 chose CDF and Associates, a New York-based company, to operate the area. CDF, however, pulled out of the deal in February 2010, citing the high costs of doing business in Connecticut. The ski area was placed back on the market, and by the spring of 2010 three entities were reportedly interested in buying the property. Plans changed sometime over the summer of 2010, and the town chose to retain ownership of the ski area while leasing it to a separate company, Alpine Associates. On 22 December 2010, the Connecticut State Bond Commission approved $500,000 to be spent on maintenance on Powder Ridge. On 24 May 2011, the town of Middlefield approved a plan to sell the ski area to Alpine Ridge LLC, a Pennsylvania-based operator of ski areas. At the time, Alpine Ridge said it planned to upgrade facilities at the area, with a reopening by December 2013. However, on 25 October 2011, the town of Middlefield announced that Alpine Ridge had on 20 October informed the town's board of selectmen it no longer plans to buy the ski area.

In February 2012, Middlefield approved a $1 million bid from Brownstone Exploration & Discovery Park, based in Portland, Connecticut, to buy Powder Ridge. In July 2012, the two parties signed an agreement for Brownstone to buy the ski area for $700,000, to be paid in $100,000 annual increments. Brownstone also agreed to invest $2 million into Powder Ridge to restore the ski area, though the company estimated it would cost an additional $1.5 million to bring the facilities to current standards. The sale closed on 13 September, and after some delays in the planned reopening for the 2013-2014 season, the park was reopened for skiing in early January 2014. During this time, Powder Ridge created a new rule requiring helmets while skiing/snowboarding on the mountain, making them the only mountain in Connecticut to have this rule in place.

== Mountain statistics ==
Powder Ridge has 19 named trails on 80 acres (32 ha) of skiable terrain. Snowmaking is available on 68 acres (28 ha), and night skiing on 40 acres (16 ha). 42% of trails are rated as beginner runs, 37% are intermediate, 21% advanced, and no runs rated as expert. There are a total of 6 lifts. The vertical drop is 417 feet (127 m) from the summit at an elevation of 800 feet (240 m) to the base at 383 feet (117 m).

== Park features ==
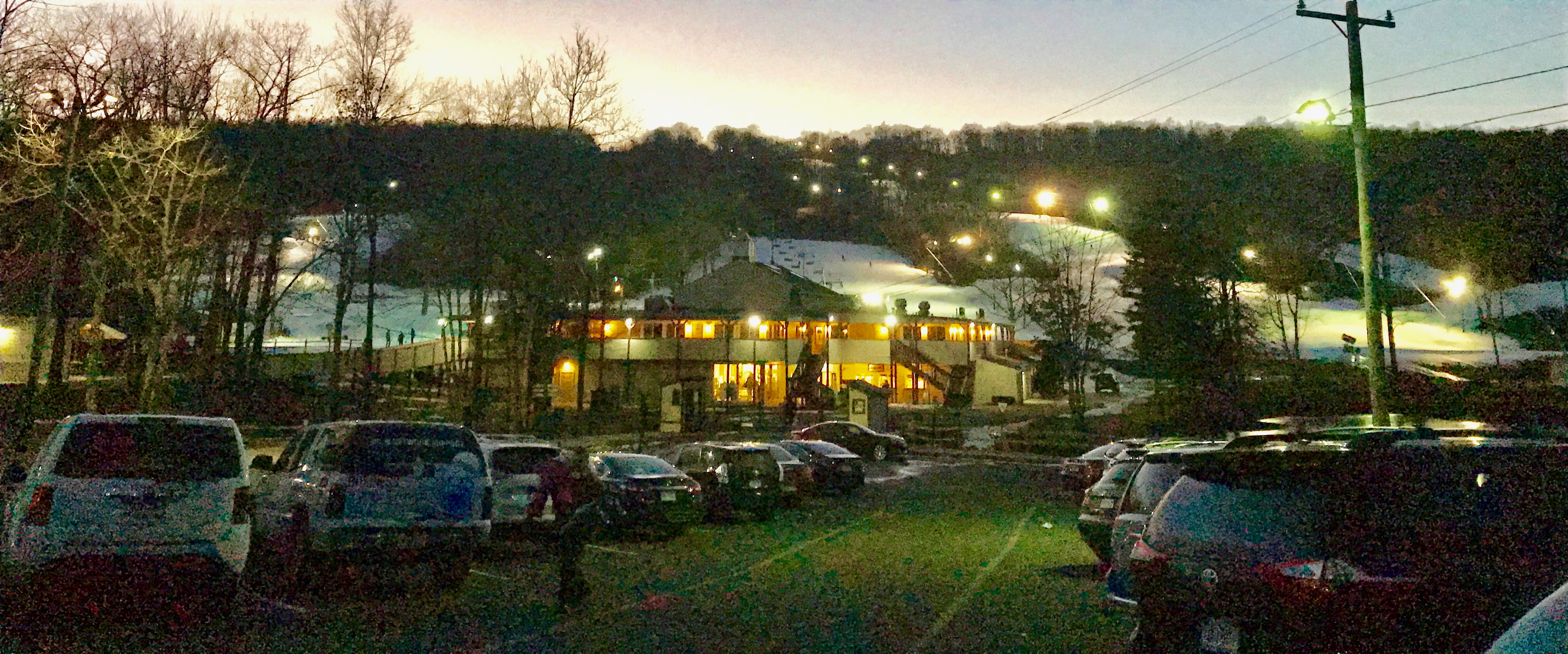
Powder Ridge Mountain Park and Resort lodge, ski slopes (with lights) from the drop off area and short term parking.

The park's total area covers 255 acres (103 ha), and includes facilities for freestyle skiing, snowboarding, snowtubing, racing, and snowbiking such as rails, jumps, and a full size half-pipe. There is also a restaurant/lodge and a retail store.

The Mattabesett Trail crosses the summit of Powder Ridge.

== Summer ==
Powder Ridge offers a variety of activities during the summer, including disk golf, synthetic skiing and snowboarding, mountain biking, tubing, and zip lines.
