= Connecticut Route 147 =

State highway in Middlesex County, Connecticut, US

Route 147
- Map of Middlesex County in southern Connecticut with Route 147 highlighted in red

Route information
- Maintained by CTDOT
- Length: 5.09 mi (8.19 km)
- Existed: 1932–present

Major junctions
- South end: Route 17 in Durham
- North end: Route 66 in Middlefield

Location
- Country: United States
- State: Connecticut
- Counties: Middlesex

Highway system
- Connecticut State Highway System; Interstate; US; State; SSR; SR; Scenic
← Route 146	→ Route 148

Route 147 is a state highway in central Connecticut running from Durham to Middlefield.

== Route description ==
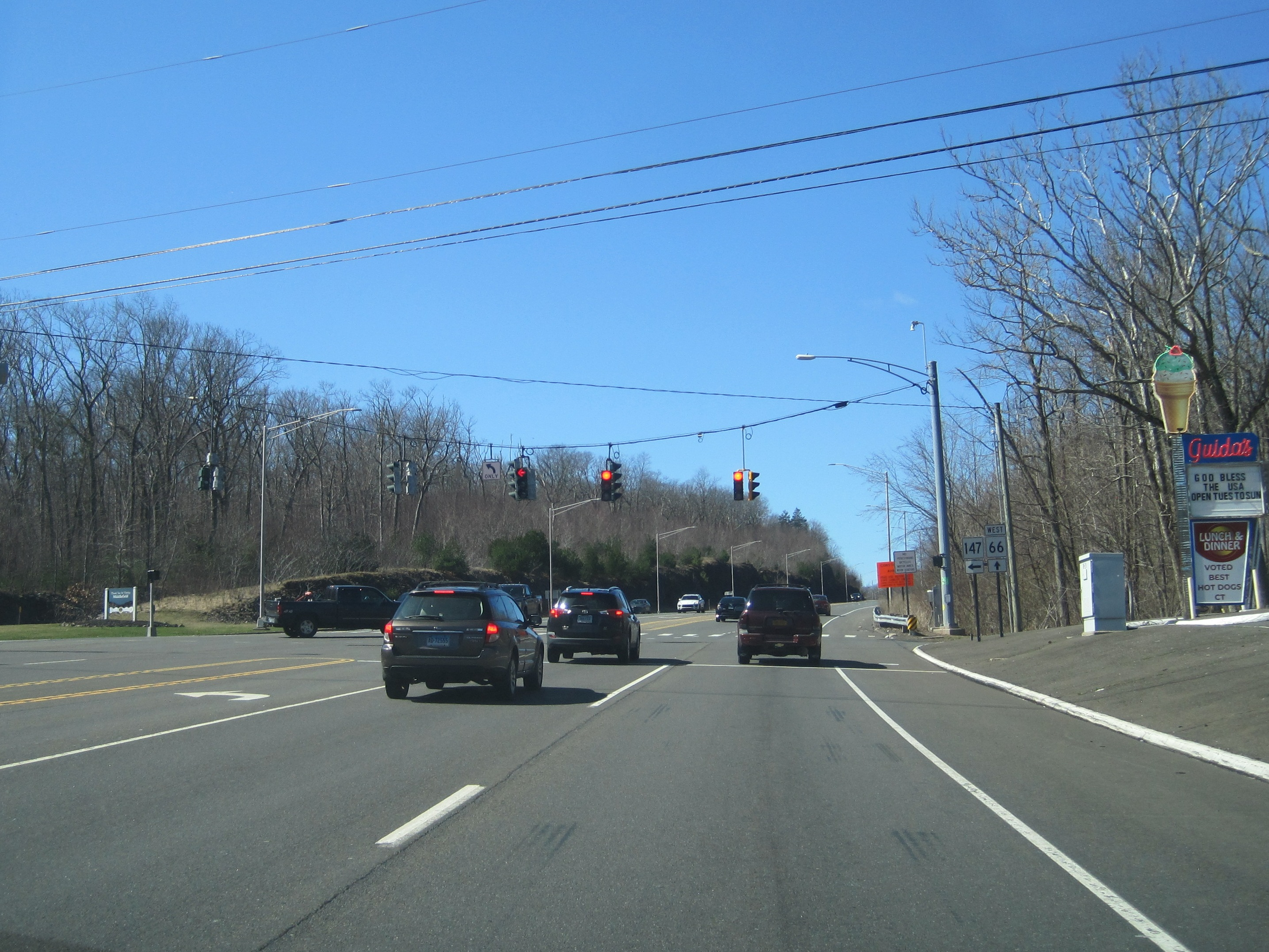
Northern terminus of CT 147 at CT 66

Route 147 begins as Middlefield Road at an intersection with Route 17 just north of the town center of Durham. It heads northwest, crossing into the town of Middlefield after 0.9 miles (1.4 km), where the road changes name to Durham Road. Within Middlefield, it continues northwest, crossing the Coginchaug River, to an overlap with Route 157 (Main Street) about 1.2 miles (1.9 km) north of the town line, during which it heads north. After overlapping Route 157 for 0.7 miles (1.1 km), the two routes split with Route 157 continuing northeast to Middlefield center and the village of Rockfall, and Route 147 heading northwest as Baileyville Road to the village of Baileyville towards the city of Meriden. Route 147 continues northwest and north for another 2.3 miles (3.7 km) until it ends at an intersection with Route 66 in northwestern Middlefield.

== History ==
In the 1920s, the Durham-Middlefield route continuing towards Meriden was designated as a secondary state highway known as Highway 330. It ran more or less along the alignment of modern Route 147. In the 1932 state highway renumbering, old Highway 330 was renumbered to Route 147. At the same time, the Middlefield-Middletown route was created as Route 157. By 1938, Route 157 took over the Durham Road portion of Route 147. In 1966, however, this change was reversed and Route 157 was extended to the southwest towards along its modern alignment south of Route 147.

== Junction list ==
The entire route is in Middlesex County.

Location	mi	km	Destinations	Notes
Durham	0.00	0.00	Route 17 – Middletown, North Branford	Southern terminus
Middlefield	2.07	3.33	Route 157 south – Wallingford	Southern end of Route 157 concurrency
Middlefield	2.76	4.44	Route 157 north – Rockfall	Northern end of Route 157 concurrency
Middlefield	5.09	8.19	Route 66 – Middletown, Meriden	Northern terminus
1.000 mi = 1.609 km; 1.000 km = 0.621 mi: Concurrency terminus
