= Nehemiah Hubbard House =

Historic house in Connecticut, United States

- U.S. National Register of Historic Places
- U.S. Historic district – Contributing property
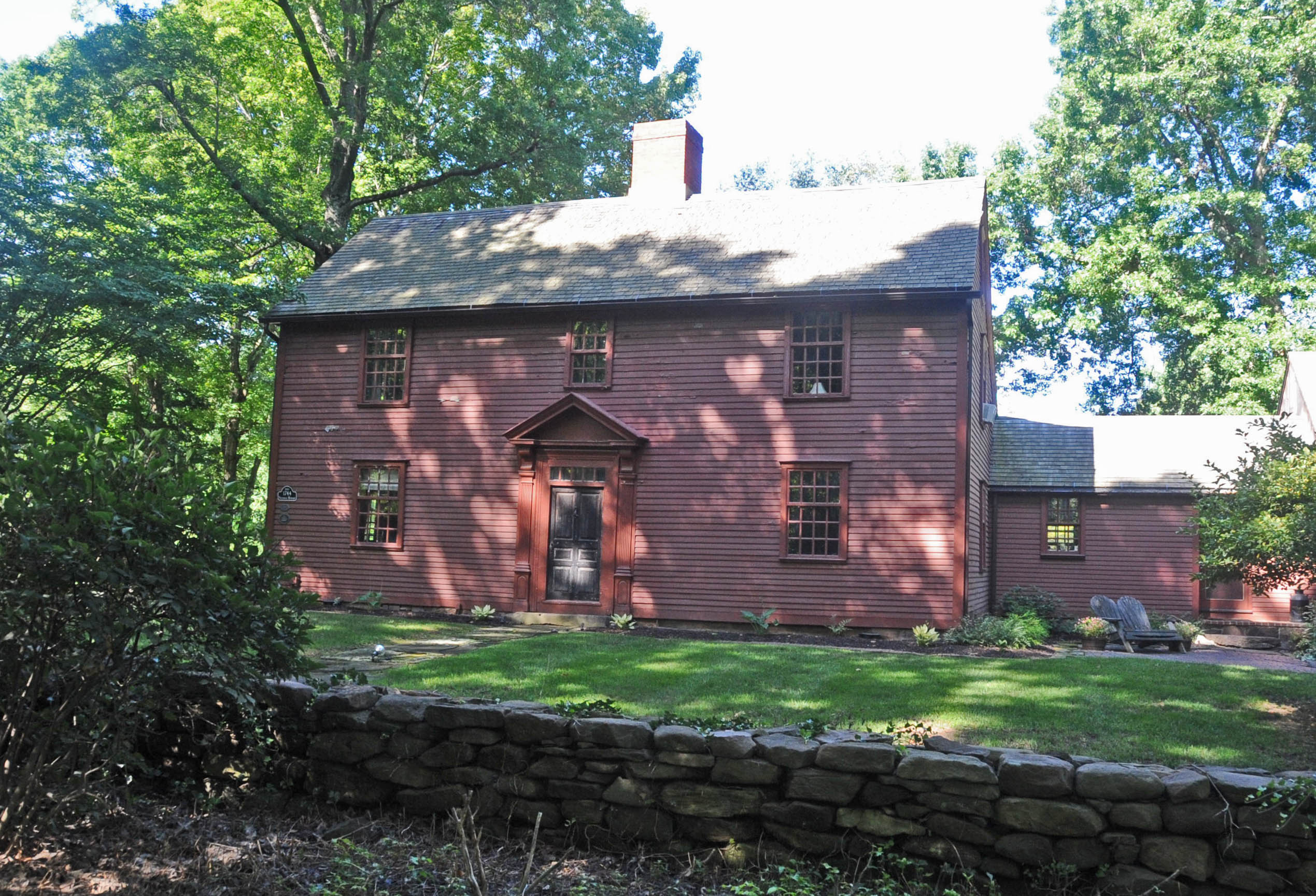
- In 2016

- Location within Connecticut Location within the United States
- Location: Middletown, Connecticut
- Coordinates: 41°32′17″N 72°40′52″W
- Area: 10.4 acres (4.2 ha)
- Built: 1745
- Architect: Kelly, J. Frederick; Isham, Norman M.
- Architectural style: Colonial
- Part of: Wadsworth Estate Historic District (ID96000775)
- NRHP reference No.: 82003771

Significant dates
- Added to NRHP: May 11, 1982
- Designated CP: July 25, 1996

The Nehemiah Hubbard House is a historic house at the corner of Laurel Grove and Wadsworth Street, Middletown, Connecticut. Built in 1745, it is a center-chimney colonial style house built of clapboard siding and brownstone foundation with wood shingle roof; using a structural system of wood frame, post and beam with gable roof. It was built as a residence which is its current use.

== Relationship to surroundings ==
This colonial saltbox house is sited on a large lot at the rural western edge of Middletown. Screened from the front by bushes, trees, and a stone wall, and on the east by a cedar paling fence, the house is very secluded. A two-story gambrel-roofed wing on the west, a two-car garage on the north, and a large nineteenth-century barn south of the house complete the estate.

== Significance ==
This house was the home of Nehemiah Hubbard, a prominent banker and merchant of late eighteenth-century Middletown. The land, part of an original 226-acre (91 ha) tract, belonged to the Hubbard family, noted early settlers of the town, for a number of generations. Nehemiah was in the fourth generation of Middletown Hubbards. Although the house was some distance from the commercial section of Middletown, Hubbard used the property as a home and for extensive farming operations. Nehemiah Hubbard was Deputy Quartermaster for Middletown during the American Revolutionary War, and was the first President of the Middletown Bank. The house remained in the Hubbard family through the nineteenth century. Early in the 20th century, it was the home of Thomas McDonough Russell, Sr.

This 1744 center-chimney saltbox retains most of its early features, both interior and exterior. The main fireplace with its beehive oven measures over eight feet wide. Much early hardware remains. The two-story gambrel-roofed "kitchen wing" is added, but is sympathetic in style with the original house. The house underwent restoration in 1929 by the Colonel Wadsworth family. It continues to be used as a residence.

== See also ==
- National Register of Historic Places listings in Middletown, Connecticut
