= Main Street Historic District (Durham, Connecticut) =

Historic district in Connecticut, United States

- U.S. National Register of Historic Places
- U.S. Historic district
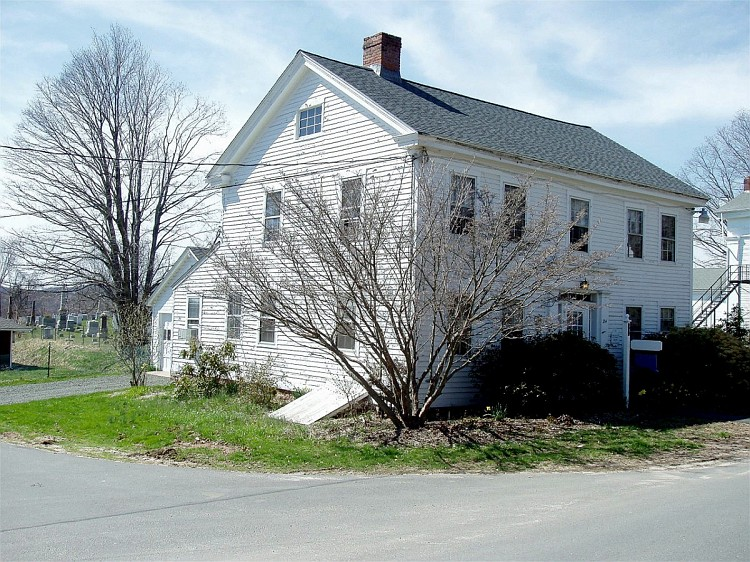
- The Oliver Knowles House (1839)

- Location within Connecticut Location within the United States
- Location: Roughly Maple Avenue and Main Street between Talcott Lane and Higganum Road, Durham, Connecticut
- Coordinates: 41°28′26″N 72°40′51″W
- Area: 160 acres (65 ha)
- Architectural style: Colonial Revival, Greek Revival, Colonial
- NRHP reference No.: 86002837
- Added to NRHP: September 4, 1986

The Main Street Historic District encompasses the historic civic, commercial, and residential center of Durham, Connecticut. The district is primarily linear and runs along Main Street (Route 17) from between Higganum Road and Town House Road in the south to Talcott Lane in the north, and along Maple Avenue, which parallels Main Street. The district includes most of its colonial architecture, as well as many of its civic buildings. It was listed on the National Register of Historic Places in 1986.

== Description and history ==
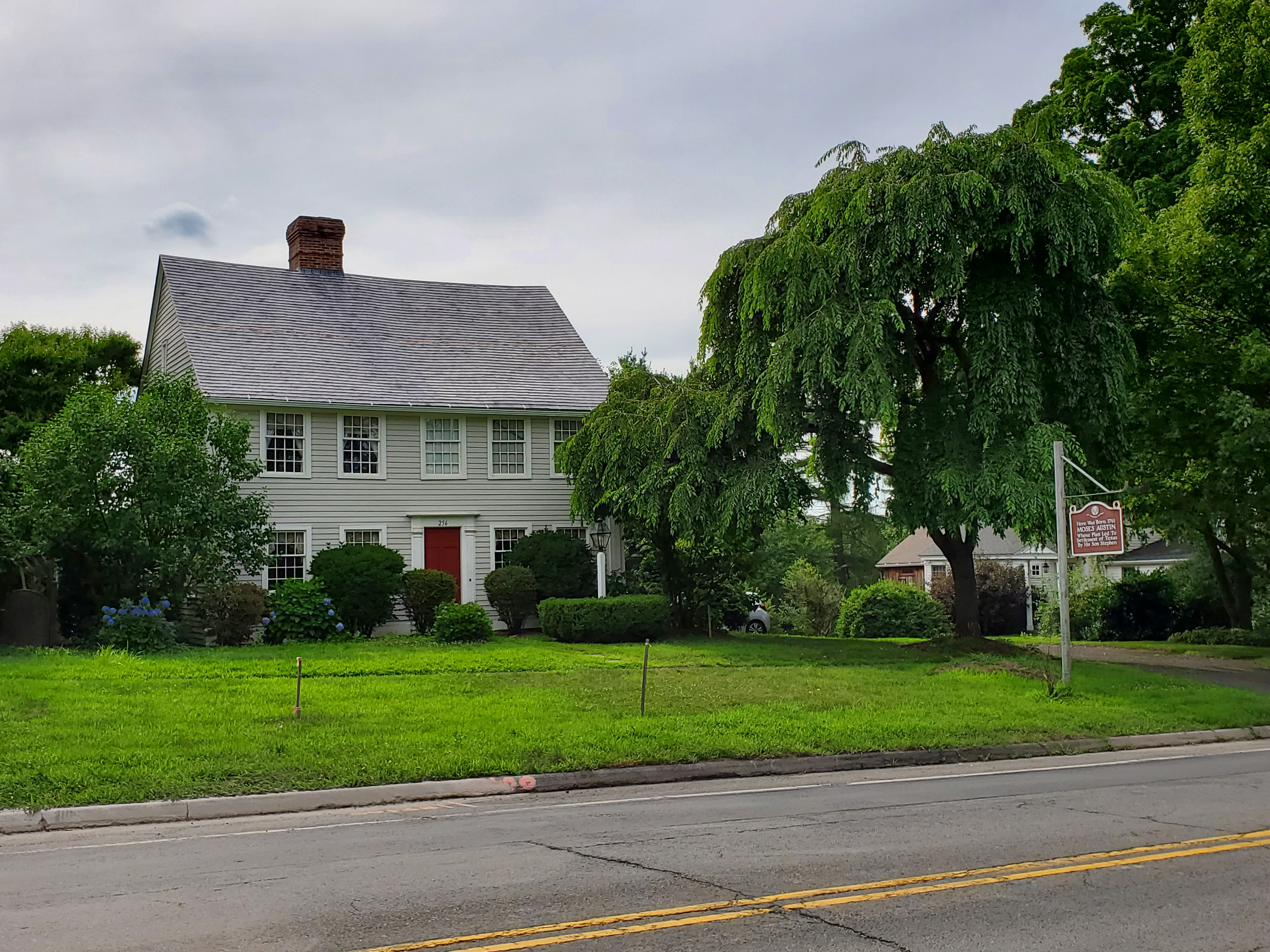
The Elias Austin House (1743), birthplace of Texas settler Moses Austin, as seen from the Phineas Camp House

Colonial settlers divided land that is now Durham in the 17th century, but the town was not platted and settled until the early 18th century. Politically powerful landowners from Hartford were instrumental in securing the location of the town center in its northern part. Main Street was laid out along a ridge of high land between swampy areas that were a defining feature of the town at the time. The swampiness prevented the formation of a full grid of streets, but Maple Street was run parallel to Main Street on its west side during the 19th century. The town was primarily agricultural, but the center benefited from being on a major route between Hartford and New Haven, with taverns and other services for travelers. In the early 19th century, shoemaking arose as a cottage industry, with other small industries added later in the century.

The historic district contains 112 contributing and 23 non-contributing properties over an area of 160 acres (65 ha). It contains a diversity of architectural styles, reflective of more than 200 years of development. The residential architecture includes a few examples of high-style architecture, ranging from the Federal to the Victorian, but also includes examples of vernacular buildings constructed for lower-class mill workers. Non-residential buildings include the town hall, a Greek Revival church built in 1849 that has been converted to that use, as well as the 1901 library, another Greek Revival Church (built 1826), and an early 19th century tavern.

== See also ==
- National Register of Historic Places listings in Middlesex County, Connecticut
