= Lake Beseck =

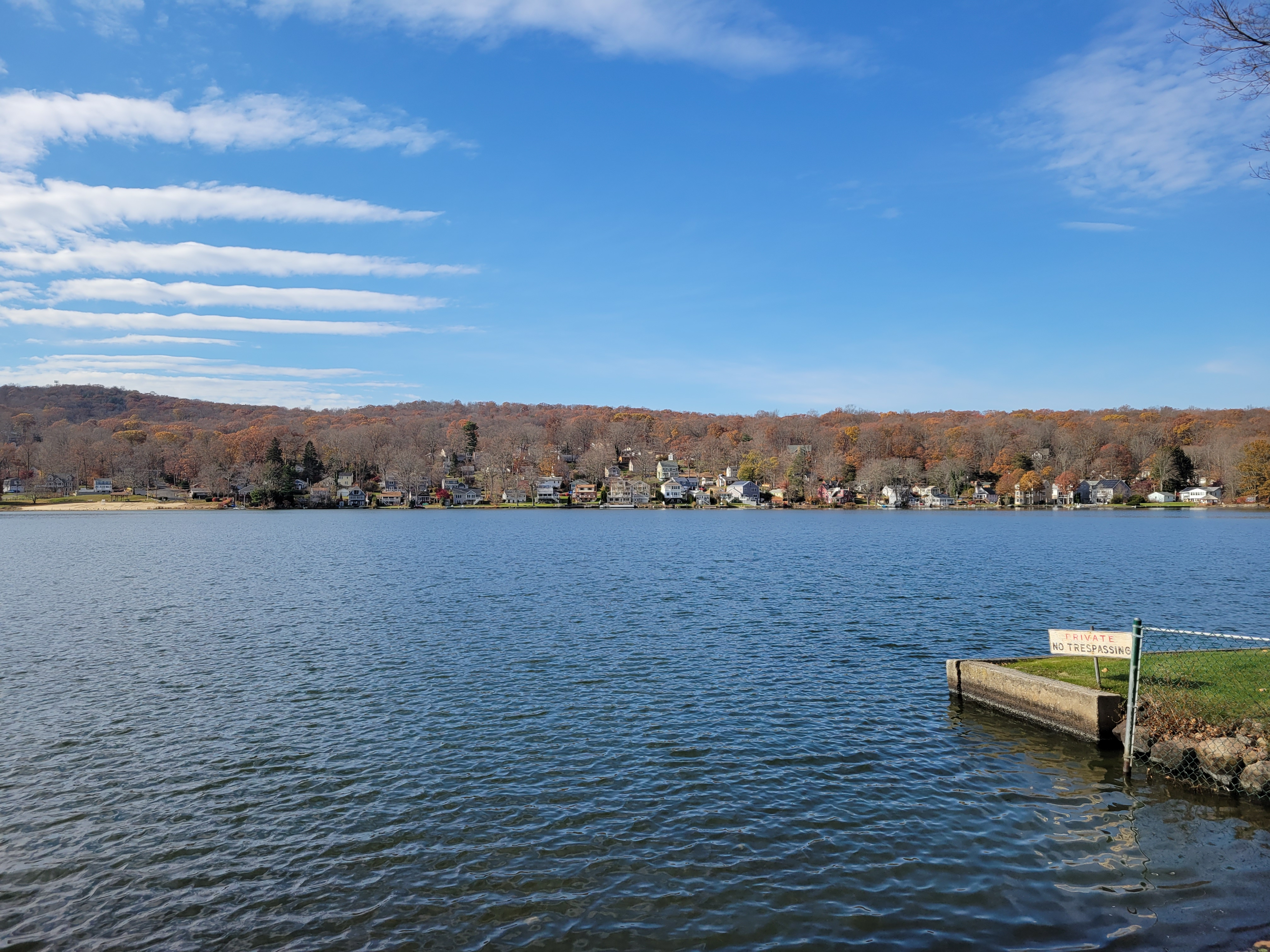

- Location within Connecticut Location within the United States
- Location: Middlefield, Connecticut
- Coordinates: 41°30′52″N 72°43′56″W
- Type: reservoir
- Basin countries: United States
- Max. length: 1 mi (1.6 km)
- Max. width: 0.25 mi (0.40 km)
- Surface area: 116 acres (47 ha)
- Max. depth: 24 ft (7.3 m)
- Surface elevation: 348 ft (106 m)
- Website: http://www.middlefieldct.org/lake-beseck-beach/

Lake Beseck, also known as Beseck Lake, is a body of water in Middlefield, Connecticut, measuring a little less than 1 mile in length and a quarter mile in width. It is owned by the Department of Environmental Protection and was created in 1846 when it was dammed. The initial dam, finished in 1848, was ten feet lower than the current one. The dam was raised in 1852 and in 1870, each time by five feet; it was rebuilt in 1938.
