= Coginchaug River =

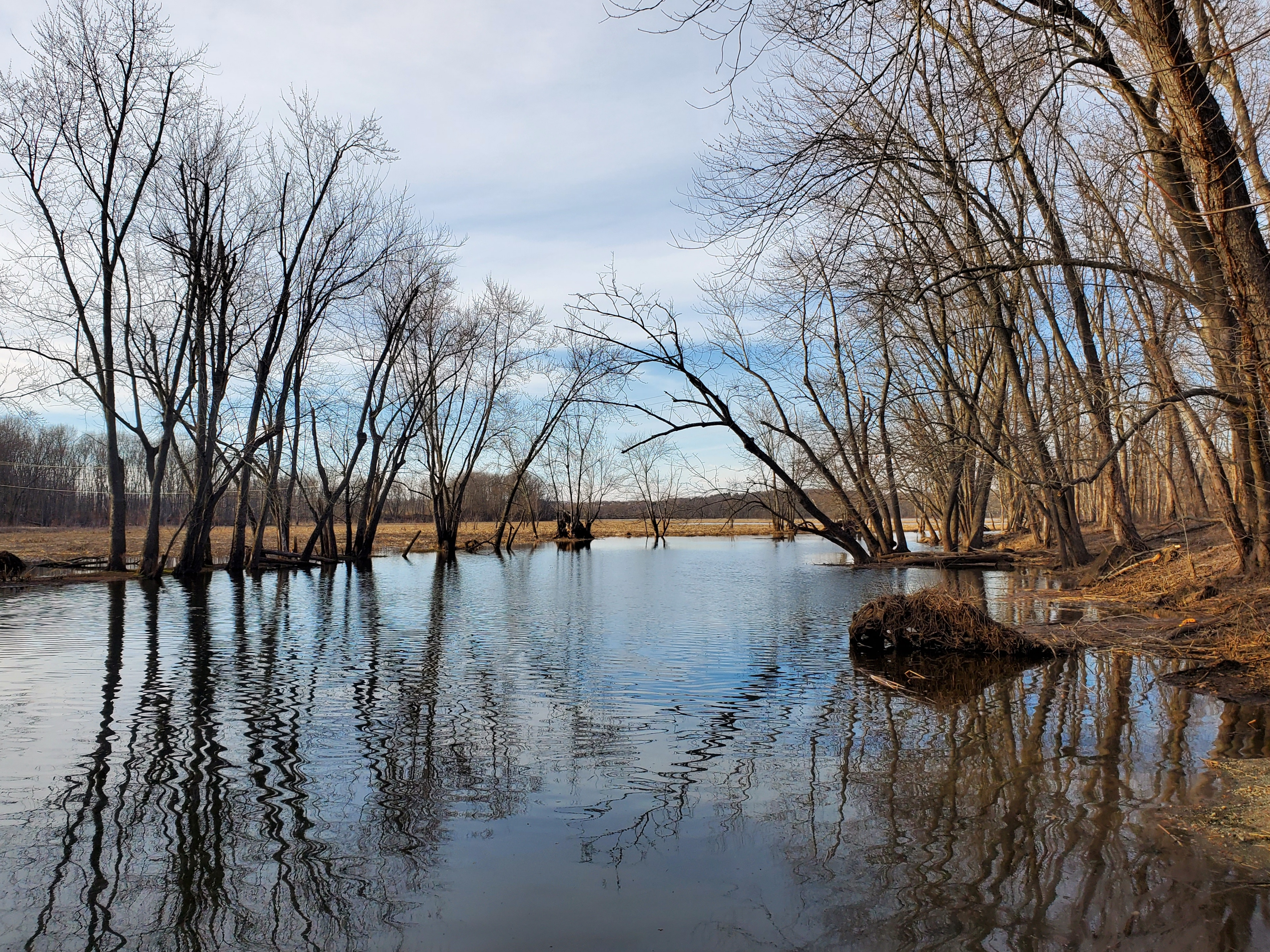
- The Coginchaug River in Middletown in 2023

Location
- Country: United States
- State: Connecticut
- Cities: Middletown, Middlefield, Durham, Guilford

Physical characteristics
- Source
  - location: Guilford, Connecticut, New Haven County, Connecticut, United States
  - coordinates: 41°24′25″N 72°42′19″W
  - elevation: 335 ft (102 m)
- Mouth: Mattabesset River
  - location: Middletown, CT, Connecticut
  - coordinates: 41°34′42″N 72°39′30″W
  - elevation: 20 ft (6.1 m)
- Length: 16.1 mi (25.9 km)
- Basin size: 39 mi^{2} (100 km^{2})
- Discharge
  - location: Middletown, CT

The Coginchaug River in Connecticut, with a watershed including 39 sq mi of forests, pastures, farmland, industrial, and commercial areas, is the main tributary of the Mattabesset River. It is 16.1 mi long, and the river flows northwards from a point approximately 1.8 mi south of the Durham line in Guilford, Connecticut, into Durham and then Middlefield, meeting the Mattabesset in Middletown, about 0.8 miles (1.3 km) upstream of the Connecticut River. The name "Coginchaug" comes from a local Native American name for the Durham area and it was the original name for the town. It has been said to mean "The Great Swamp."

In 2006, the Coginchaug was among Connecticut's 85 waterways cited to be of "lower quality", in view of the elevated levels of bacteria, including E. coli. Currently, efforts are being made by the Natural Resources Conservation Service of the United States Department of Agriculture to reduce the number of bacteria introduced into the river from untreated sewage, sanitary sewer overflow, agricultural runoff, leaking septic tanks, etc.

== Canoeing ==
The river has become a popular canoeing route. In 2006, it was considered safe for canoeing, though it is not safe for in-water activities like swimming. Flowing from Myer Huber Pond, it runs slowly through thick swamps which stretch over 3 miles (5 km) and are likely to be impassable except immediately after heavy rains. The main paddling route starts at Route 147 and continues downstream, north, through additional slow-moving waters and a swamp. There are many portages, including those at six dams and at Wadsworth Falls, the only major waterfall. Class II whitewater is possible before it flows into the tidal marsh of the Mattabesset River.

== See also ==
- List of rivers of Connecticut
