= Middlefield, Connecticut =

- Town
- Town of Middlefield
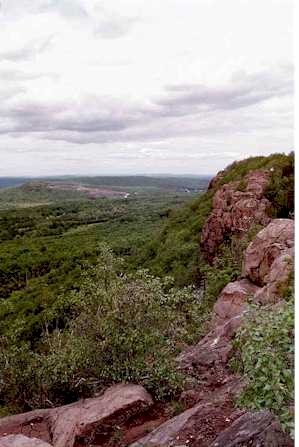
- The view from Higby Mountain

- Seal
- Interactive map of Middlefield, Connecticut
- Coordinates: 41°31′03″N 72°42′44″W
- Country: United States
- U.S. state: Connecticut
- County: Middlesex
- Region: Lower CT River Valley
- Incorporated: May 9, 1866

Government
  - Type: Selectman-town meeting
  - First Selectman: Robert Yamartino
  - Selectman: Carol Bufithis
  - Selectman: James Irish

Area
  - Total: 13.3 sq mi (34.4 km^{2})
  - Land: 12.7 sq mi (32.9 km^{2})
  - Water: 0.62 sq mi (1.6 km^{2})
- Elevation: 210 ft (64 m)

Population (2020)
  - Total: 4,217
  - Density: 332/sq mi (128/km^{2})
- Time zone: UTC−5 (Eastern)
  - Summer (DST): UTC−4 (Eastern)
- ZIP code: 06455, 06481
- Area codes: 860/959
- FIPS code: 09-47080
- GNIS feature ID: 0213460
- Website: www.middlefieldct.org

Middlefield is a town in Middlesex County, Connecticut, United States. The town is part of the Lower Connecticut River Valley Planning Region. The population was 4,217 at the 2020 census. The town includes the village of Rockfall in the northeastern section.

== History ==
Middlefield, in Middlesex County, is so named because it is halfway between Middletown and Durham, and Middletown and Meriden. The Old North Burying Ground was established for those living west of Middletown and the first burial was in 1738. Middlefield became a town in 1866 by an act of the Connecticut Legislature. The town was previously part of the City of Middletown.

== Geography ==
According to the United States Census Bureau, the town has a total area of 13.3 square miles (34 km^{2}), of which 12.7 square miles (33 km^{2}) is land and 0.6 square miles (1.6 km^{2}) (4.65%) is water.

The west side of Middlefield is flanked by the Metacomet Ridge, a mountainous trap rock ridgeline that stretches from Long Island Sound to nearly the Vermont border. Notable mountains of the Metacomet Ridge in Middlefield include Higby Mountain and Besek Mountain. The 50 mile Mattabesett Trail traverses the ridge. The Nature Conservancy manages the summit and ledges of Higby Mountain.

== Attractions ==
Middlefield offers many seasonal activities. Residents can also go ice-skating on one of the many ponds located at the edge of Peckham Park. In the summer Peckham Park has little league baseball games going on almost every day of the week. The smaller kids can play on the jungle gym or play basketball and soccer. Some other summer activities could be golfing on one of the two local golf courses or go to the beach located on Lake Beseck just off of Route 147. Residents can also enjoy picking fruit, playing golf, shopping, and eating at Lyman Orchards. Middlefield is also home to the Powder Ridge Ski Area.

Wadsworth Falls State Park, or simply Wadsworth Falls, is a public recreation and preserved natural area located on the Coginchaug River in the towns of Middletown and Middlefield, Connecticut. The state park's 285 acres (115 ha) offer trails, fishing, swimming, and picnicking. It is managed by the Connecticut Department of Energy and Environmental Protection.

Powder Ridge Ski Area (category Tourist attractions in Middlesex County, Connecticut) is a small ski area located in Middlefield, Connecticut. It began operations on January 22, 1961, the day JFK was inaugurated. It closed in 2007, and has since reopened.

== Registered historic places in town ==
- David, II Lyman House – 5 Lyman Road (added March 6, 1986)
- William, Jr. Ward House – 137 Powder Hill Road (added March 19, 1988)

== Education ==
Middlefield, along with Durham, forms Regional School District 13. It offers a traditional as well as an "Integrated Day" program of education for students in the two communities. The schools in Regional School District 13 are: Brewster Elementary School (K-4), John Lyman Elementary School (grades K–4), Memorial Middle School (grades 5–6), Strong Middle School (grades 7–8) and Coginchaug Regional High School (grades 9–12). The town is also home to the private pre-school–8 school The Independent Day School.

== Town seal ==
The town seal is a view of Middlefield as seen through a gun sight. The crosshairs represent the gun sight manufacturing that has taken place in Middlefield for many years. The four quadrants of the gun sight are broken into different aspects of the town of Middlefield. The upper left-hand quadrant is a picture of the 1700s saltbox homes that still stand in Middlefield. The upper right-hand quadrant represents the orchards and farmland that make up much of the open space of Middlefield. The lower left-hand quadrant represents many of the outdoor activities that go on in Middlefield such as fishing, hunting, boating, skiing, golfing, and many other activities. The lower right-hand quadrant is the old pistol shop that used to be a major part of Middlefield's makeup. The seal was designed by Donald Ginter.

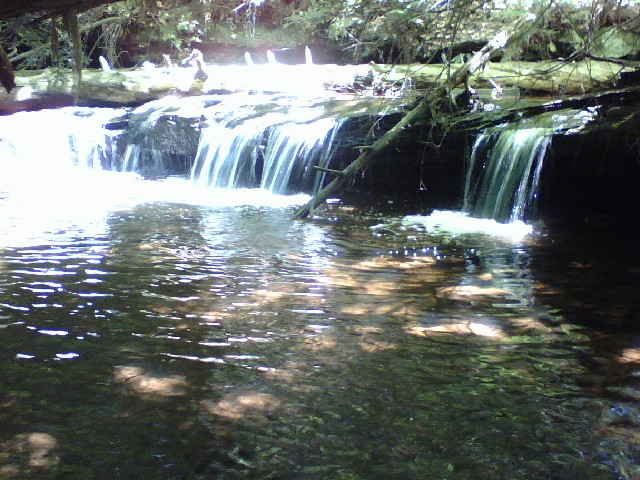
Brook Falls

== Demographics ==
Historical population
Census	Pop.	Note	%±
1870	1,053		—
1880	928		−11.9%
1890	1,002		8.0%
1900	845		−15.7%
1910	1,036		22.6%
1920	1,047		1.1%
1930	1,204		15.0%
1940	1,230		2.2%
1950	1,983		61.2%
1960	3,255		64.1%
1970	4,132		26.9%
1980	3,796		−8.1%
1990	3,925		3.4%
2000	4,203		7.1%
2010	4,425		5.3%
2020	4,217		−4.7%
U.S. Decennial Census

As of the census of 2000, there were 4,203 people, 1,645 households, and 1,199 families residing in the town. The population density was 330.9 inhabitants per square mile (127.8/km^{2}). There were 1,740 housing units at an average density of 137.0 per square mile (52.9/km^{2}). The racial makeup of the town was 97.76% White, 0.74% African American, 0.02% Native American, 0.36% Asian, 0.02% Pacific Islander, 0.43% from other races, and 0.67% from two or more races. Hispanic or Latino of any race were 1.33% of the population.

There were 1,645 households, out of which 34.0% had children under the age of 18 living with them, 62.4% were married couples living together, 7.3% had a female householder with no husband present, and 27.1% were non-families. 22.3% of all households were made up of individuals, and 11.0% had someone living alone who was 65 years of age or older. The average household size was 2.56 and the average family size was 3.03.

In the town, the population was spread out, with 24.7% under the age of 18, 4.6% from 18 to 24, 30.2% from 25 to 44, 24.8% from 45 to 64, and 15.6% who were 65 years of age or older. The median age was 40 years. For every 100 females, there were 101.1 males. For every 100 females age 18 and over, there were 97.5 males.

The median income for a household in the town was $59,448, and the median income for a family was $69,267. Males had a median income of $43,953 versus $31,487 for females. The per capita income for the town was $25,711. About 0.6% of families and 1.5% of the population were below the poverty line, including 0.8% of those under age 18 and 3.4% of those age 65 or over.

== Politics ==
Middlefield has a selectman-town meeting form of government. The current acting first selectman is Robert Yamartino, whom assumed the office of First Selectman on December 8, 2021, due to the death of incumbent first selectman Ed Bailey. The other current selectman is Carol Bufithis.

Voter registration and party enrollment as of October 25, 2005
Party	Active voters	Inactive voters	Total voters	Percentage
Democratic	920	20	940	29.63%
Republican	590	23	613	19.32%
Unaffiliated	1,571	42	1,613	50.84%
Minor Parties	7	0	7	0.22%
Total	3,088	85	3,173	100%

=== State politics ===
Middlefield is in the 13th state senate district, being represented by Democrat Christine Cohen, and in the 90th district in the state house by Republican Craig Fishbein.

Middlefield has swung for Republican candidates in gubernatorial elections, including in 2018, where Republican Bob Stefanowski won 53% of the vote.

=== Federal politics ===
Middlefield is part of Connecticut's 3rd congressional district, and is represented by Rosa DeLauro. It has swung in presidential elections, voting for Joe Biden in 2020 and Barack Obama in 2012 but supporting Donald Trump in 2016.
