= Durham, Connecticut =

- Town
- Town of Durham
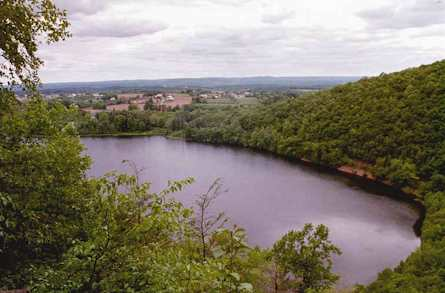
- View from Pistapaug Mountain

- Seal
- Interactive map of Durham, Connecticut
- Coordinates: 41°27′37″N 72°40′55″W
- Country: United States
- U.S. state: Connecticut
- County: Middlesex
- Region: Lower CT River Valley
- Incorporated: 1708

Government
  - Type: Selectman-town meeting
  - First selectman: Brendan Rea (R)
  - Selectman: Robert Chadd (R)
  - Selectman: Thomas Hennick (D)

Area
  - Total: 23.8 sq mi (61.6 km^{2})
  - Land: 23.6 sq mi (61.1 km^{2})
  - Water: 0.15 sq mi (0.4 km^{2})
- Elevation: 161 ft (49 m)

Population (2020)
  - Total: 7,152
  - Density: 303.1/sq mi (117.0/km^{2})
- Time zone: UTC-5 (Eastern)
  - Summer (DST): UTC-4 (Eastern)
- ZIP code: 06422
- Area codes: 860/959
- FIPS code: 09-20810
- GNIS feature ID: 0213419
- Website: www.townofdurhamct.org

Durham (/ˈdɜːrəm/ DURR-əm) is a town in Middlesex County, Connecticut, United States. Durham is a former farming village on the Coginchaug River in central Connecticut. The town is part of the Lower Connecticut River Valley Planning Region. The population was 7,152 at the 2020 census. Every autumn, the town hosts the Durham Fair, the largest volunteer agricultural fair in New England.

The Durham town center is listed by the U.S. Census Bureau as a census-designated place. The core of the town center has also been listed as a historic district on the National Register of Historic Places.

== Geography ==
According to the United States Census Bureau, the town has a total area of 23.8 square miles (62 km^{2}), of which 23.6 square miles (61 km^{2}) is land and 0.2 square mile (40 ha or 0.67%) is water. The town center CDP has a total area of 6.3 square miles (16 km^{2}), of which 6.3 square miles (16 km^{2}) is land and 0.16% is water.

The west side of Durham is flanked by the Metacomet Ridge, a mountainous trap rock ridgeline that stretches from Long Island Sound to nearly the Vermont border. Notable features of the Metacomet ridge in Durham include Trimountain, Fowler Mountain, Pistapaug Mountain, and the northern tip of Totoket Mountain. The 50-mile (80-kilometer) Mattabesett Trail traverses the ridge. Miller's Pond State Park is located within the town.

== History ==
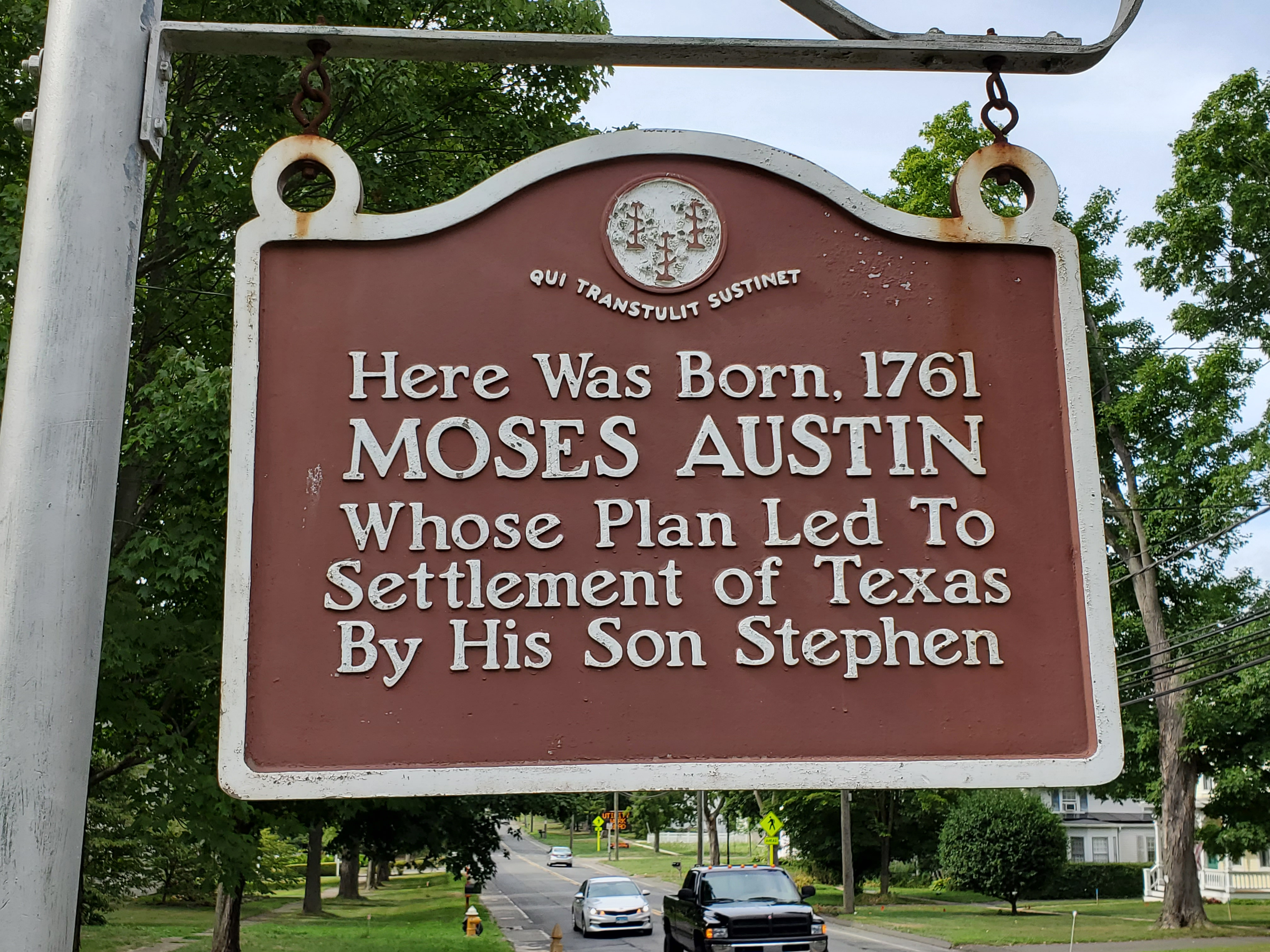
Historical marker at the Elias Austin House

Before European settlers arrived, the Coginchaug area was a Native American hunting ground. European settlers purchased tracts of land from the Mattabesset (Wangunk) tribe around 1662. These later became part of Durham, which was incorporated in 1708. The settlement was named after Durham, England. It took land from Guilford and Haddam.

Durham has one of the first public libraries in the United States. It was founded in 1733, two years after Benjamin Franklin started the Philadelphia library. Moses Austin who, along with his son Stephen F. Austin, began the settlement of Spanish and Mexican Texas by Anglo-Americans, was born in Durham in 1761. In the 1830s Durham came to prominence as the birthplace of Richard P. Robinson, who was tried for and acquitted of the infamous murder of Helen Jewett.

== Demographics ==
Historical population
Census	Pop.	Note	%±
1790	1,079		—
1800	1,029		−4.6%
1810	1,101		7.0%
1820	1,210		9.9%
1830	1,116		−7.8%
1840	1,095		−1.9%
1850	1,026		−6.3%
1860	1,130		10.1%
1870	1,086		−3.9%
1880	990		−8.8%
1890	856		−13.5%
1900	884		3.3%
1910	997		12.8%
1920	959		−3.8%
1930	1,044		8.9%
1940	1,098		5.2%
1950	1,804		64.3%
1960	3,096		71.6%
1970	4,489		45.0%
1980	5,143		14.6%
1990	5,732		11.5%
2000	6,627		15.6%
2010	7,388		11.5%
2020	7,152		−3.2%
U.S. Decennial Census

As of the census of 2000, there were 6,627 people, 2,277 households, and 1,871 families living in the town. The population density was 280.8 inhabitants per square mile (108.4/km^{2}). There were 2,349 housing units at an average density of 99.5 per square mile (38.4/km^{2}). The racial makeup of the town was 96.68% White, 1.15% Black or African American, 0.18% Native American, 0.85% Asian, 0.30% from other races, and 0.85% from two or more races. Hispanic or Latino people of any race were 1.54% of the population.

There were 2,277 households, out of which 41.2% had children under the age of 18 living with them, 72.3% were married couples living together, 7.1% had a female householder with no husband present, and 17.8% were non-families. 14.5% of all households were made up of individuals, and 5.9% had someone living alone who was 65 years of age or older. The average household size was 2.85 and the average family size was 3.17.

The age distribution was 29.0% under the age of 18, 4.8% from 18 to 24, 29.3% from 25 to 44, 27.4% from 45 to 64, and 9.5% who were 65 years of age or older. The median age was 38 years. For every 100 females, there were 100.4 males. For every 100 females age 18 and over, there were 94.4 males.

The median income for a household in the town was $77,639, and the median income for a family was $82,864. Males had a median income of $51,250 versus $38,833 for females. The per capita income for the town was $29,306. About 1.3% of families and 1.7% of the population were below the poverty line, including 0.4% of those under age 18 and 3.1% of those age 65 or over.

=== Town center ===
As of the census of 2000, there were 2,773 people, 1,040 households, and 809 families living in the Durham census-designated place, corresponding to the town center. The population density was 443.1 inhabitants per square mile (171.1/km^{2}). There were 1,078 housing units at an average density of 172.3 per square mile (66.5/km^{2}). The racial makeup of the CDP was 97.91% White, 0.47% Black or African American, 0.07% Native American, 0.87% Asian, 0.25% from other races, and 0.43% from two or more races. Hispanic or Latino people of any race were 1.01% of the population.

There were 1,040 households, out of which 36.7% had children under the age of 18 living with them, 66.5% were married couples living together, 8.1% had a female householder with no husband present, and 22.2% were non-families. 18.9% of all households were made up of individuals, and 9.9% had someone living alone who was 65 years of age or older. The average household size was 2.66 and the average family size was 3.06.

In the town center CDP, the age distribution was 26.1% under the age of 18, 4.4% from 18 to 24, 28.9% from 25 to 44, 27.5% from 45 to 64, and 13.0% who were 65 years of age or older. The median age was 40 years. For every 100 females, there were 96.2 males. For every 100 females age 18 and over, there were 91.4 males.

The median income for a household in the CDP was $66,505, and the median income for a family was $72,465. Males had a median income of $47,179 versus $37,500 for females. The per capita income for the CDP was $26,972. About 2.1% of families and 3.0% of the population were below the poverty line, including 1.0% of those under age 18 and 4.3% of those age 65 or over.

== Government ==
Durham has a selectman-town meeting form of government. The current first selectman is Republican Brendan Rea, who has served since 2023. The other selectmen are Republican Robert Chadd, and Democrat Thomas Hennick

Voter Registration and party enrollment as of October 31, 2024
Party	Active voters	Inactive voters	Total voters	Percentage
Republican	1,700	110	1,810	30.65%
Democratic	1,376	96	1,472	24.92%
Unaffiliated	2,341	203	2,544	43.08%
Minor parties	77	3	80	0.14%
Total	5,494	412	5,906	100%

=== State ===
General Assembly Representatives
Representative	Chamber	District	Party
Vincent Candelora	House of Representatives	86th	Rep
John-Michael Parker	House of Representatives	101st	Dem

Connecticut Senate
Representative	Chamber	District	Party
Paul Cicarella	Senate	34th	Rep
Christine Cohen	Senate	12th	Dem

=== Federal ===
United States House of Representatives
Representative	Chamber	District	Party
Rosa DeLauro	Congress	3rd	Dem

Durham has voted consistently voted Republican in gubernatorial elections. In the 2018 election, Republican Bob Stefanowski beat Democrat Ned Lamont 57%–37%.

==== Presidential elections ====
Durham is a swing town in presidential elections, having voted for the Democratic and Republican candidate five times each in the last ten election cycles.

Presidential Election Results
Year	Democratic	Republican	Third Parties
2020	49.4% 2,363	48.7% 2,330	1.9% 89
2016	44.4% 1,898	50.4% 2,156	5.2% 221
2012	48.9% 2,013	49.7% 2,043	1.4% 57
2008	52.6% 2,187	45.5% 1,893	1.9% 79
2004	49.1% 2,021	49.2% 2,026	1.7% 70
2000	50.2% 1,824	42.9% 1,561	6.9% 250
1996	46.1% 1,504	37.1% 1,209	16.8% 547
1992	35.9% 1,252	34.9% 1,215	29.2% 1,017
1988	43.1% 1,268	55.2% 1,622	1.7% 50
1984	34.0% 760	65.5% 1,754	0.5% 13
1980	33.5% 860	49.2% 1,262	17.3% 502
1976	42.0% 1,033	57.2% 1,406	0.7% 19
1972	35.1% 780	63.8% 1,418	1.1% 24
1968	41.0% 680	52.9% 878	6.1% 99
1964	57.9% 904	42.1% 655	0.00% 0
1960	39.3% 578	60.7% 894	0.00% 0
1956	27.2% 302	72.8% 810	0.00% 0

== Historic locations in Durham ==
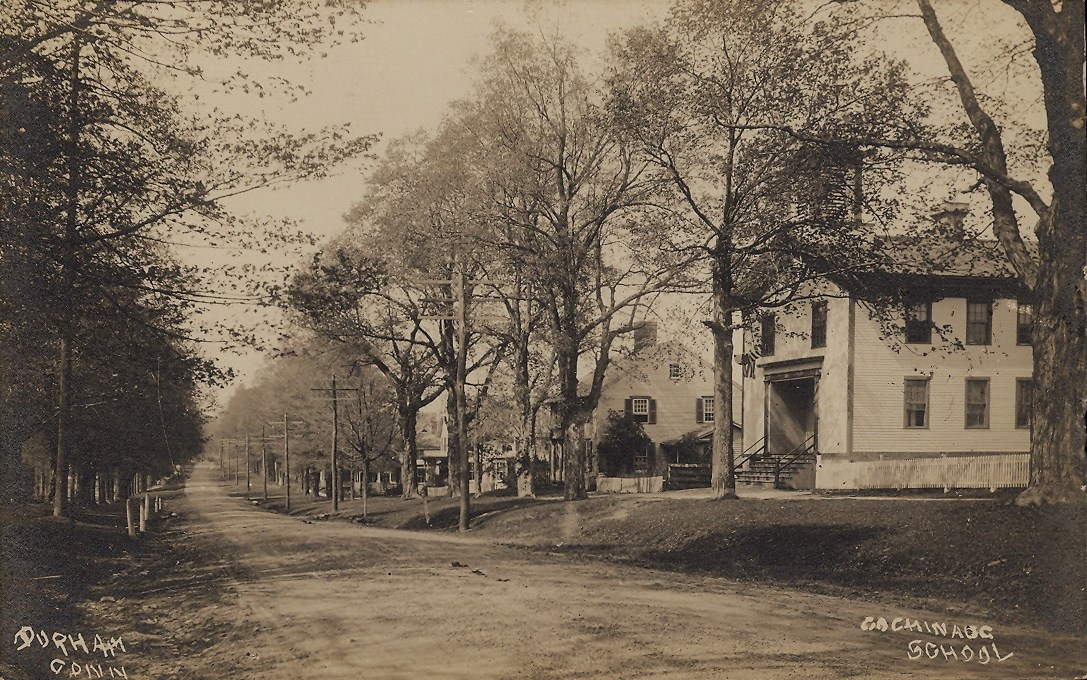
1910 street scene with school

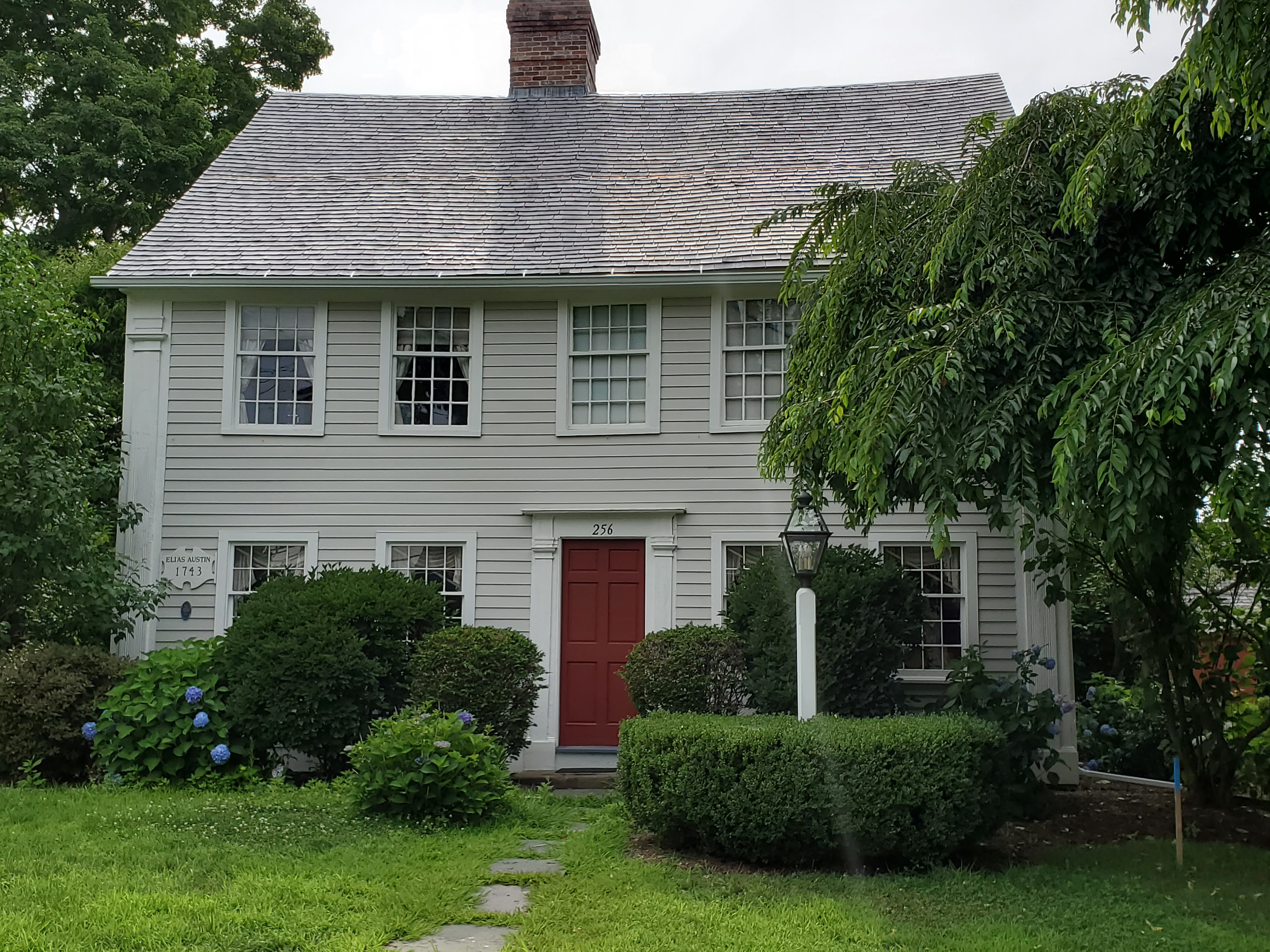
Elias Austin House, July 2020

- Elias Austin House
- Thomas Lyman House
- Main Street Historic District (the town center), noted for the architecture of the houses

== Durham Meadows superfund site ==
The Durham Meadows superfund site encompasses an area around the former Merriam Manufacturing and Durham Manufacturing facilities (both now defunct). Both companies disposed of industrial waste which leached into the town's water supply. The U.S. Environmental Protection Agency and Connecticut Department of Environmental Protection coordinated cleanup and monitoring efforts, including the delivery of free bottled water to affected residents.

== Notable people ==
- Moses Austin (1761–1821), born in Durham; businessman involved in the lead industry
- Stephen F. Austin, founder of Texas; son of Moses Austin
- Vin Baker (born 1971), professional basketball player in the National Basketball Association
- Dwight Baldwin (1798–1886), Missionary to Hawaii
- Julia Cox Bryant (1893–1967), educator, musician
- Chauncey Goodrich (1759–1815), lawyer and politician
- Elizur Goodrich (1761–1849), lawyer and politician
- Vernon "Lefty" Gomez, New York Yankee Hall of Fame; 6 and 0 in World Series play
- Phineas Lyman (1716–1774), major general in the Connecticut militia during the French and Indian War
- Charles D. Madsen, Wisconsin State Senator
- James C. Scott (born 1936), political scientist and anthropologist
- Louise Smith, Connecticut state trooper, first black woman to serve on a state police force in the United States
- James Wadsworth (1730–1816), lawyer; delegate to the Continental Congress in 1784
