= Eightmile Creek =

Eightmile Creek or Eight Mile Creek may refer to:

in Australia

- Eight Mile Creek, Queensland, a rural locality in the Shire of Burdekin
- Eight Mile Creek (South Australia), a watercourse in the south east of South Australia
  - Eight Mile Creek, South Australia, a locality in the local government area of the District Council of Grant

in the United States

- Eightmile Creek (Georgia), a stream in Georgia
- Eight Mile Creek (Kansas), a stream in Kansas spanned by the Bucher Bridge
- Eightmile Creek (Minnesota River), a stream in Minnesota
- Eightmile Creek (Missouri), a stream in Missouri
- Eightmile Creek (Tenmile Creek), a stream in New York
- Eightmile Creek (Fifteenmile Creek), a stream in Oregon
- Eightmile Creek (Washington), a stream in the Alpine Lakes Wilderness

== See also ==
- Eightmile (disambiguation)
- Eightmile River, a stream in Connecticut
