= Historic Bridges of Devil's Hopyard State Park =

- Bridge No. 1604
- U.S. National Register of Historic Places
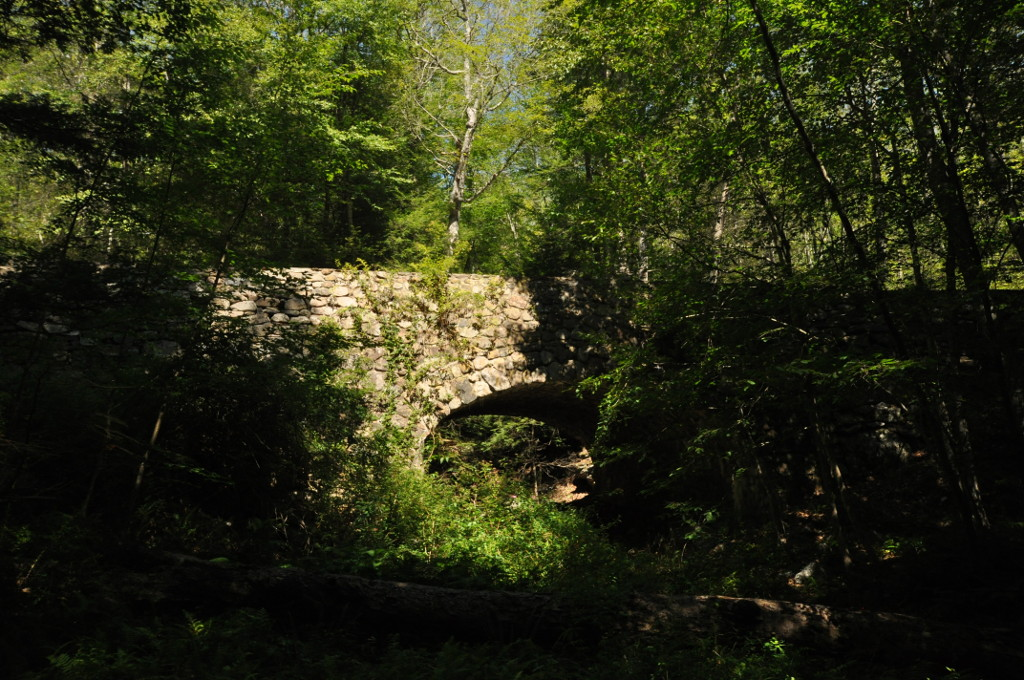
- Bridge No. 1604, as seen from the downstream side

- Location within Connecticut Location within the United States
- Location: Devil's Hopyard Road (CT 434), Devil's Hopyard State Park, East Haddam, Connecticut
- Area: less than one acre
- Built: 1937
- Architectural style: Vernacular, rustic
- MPS: Connecticut State Park and Forest Depression-Era Federal Work Relief Programs Structures TR
- NRHP reference No.: 93000642
- Added to NRHP: July 29, 1993

There are three bridges carrying Hopyard Road (part of unsigned State Road 434) over several brooks within Devil's Hopyard State Park in the U.S. state of Connecticut. The main route of SSR 434 follows the Eightmile River and the bridges cross over its minor tributaries. All three bridges are listed on the National Register of Historic Places (as Bridge No. 1603, Bridge No. 1604, and Bridge No. 1605, corresponding to their structure numbers in the National Bridge Inventory). The three bridges are essentially identical masonry arch bridges, 38 feet (12 m) long, with a roadbed 22 feet (6.7 m) wide, and were built using Depression-era federal jobs money. They are good examples of vernacular rustic park architecture.

== History ==
The state of Connecticut, in developing Devil's Hopyard State Park in the 1920s, contemplated the construction of SSR 434, but funding of those types of capital projects was suspended in 1930. Funding and work crews from the Civilian Conservation Corps resulted in the grading of 1.5 miles (2.4 km) of the road, and the partial construction of one of the three bridges in 1933-35. Funding from the federal Works Progress Administration jobs program was then applied to the project, resulting in the completion of the bridges by the end of 1937. The roadway itself was not completed until several years later. All three bridges were rehabilitated in 1988, capping the arch with concrete and a waterproof membrane before restoring the roadbed.

== Bridge data ==
Bridge No.	Crosses over	Milepost (along SSR 434)
1603	Unnamed brook	6.70; 41.483756°N 72.342370°W
1604	Unnamed brook	7.18; 41.477417°N 72.341954°W
1605	Muddy Brook	7.32; 41.475528°N 72.341911°W

== See also ==
- National Register of Historic Places listings in Middlesex County, Connecticut
- List of bridges on the National Register of Historic Places in Connecticut
