= Lake Hayward (Connecticut) =

- Long Pond, Shaw Lake
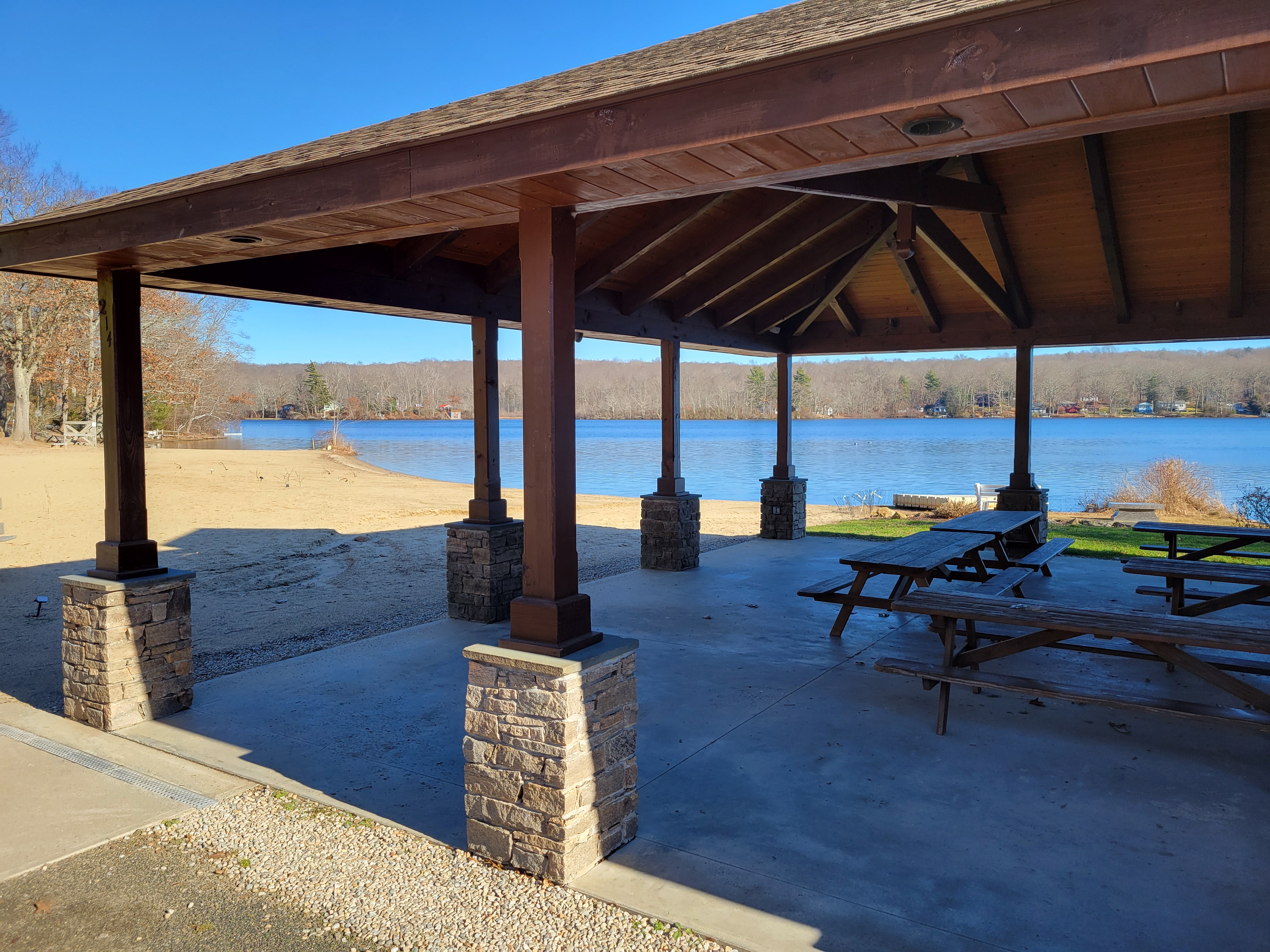
- Pavilion on Lake Hayward

- Location within Connecticut Location within the United States
- Coordinates: 41°31′21″N 72°19′47″W
- Type: lake
- Primary outflows: Eightmile River
- Max. length: 1.5 mi (2.4 km)
- Max. width: 1 mi (1.6 km)
- Surface area: 174 acres (70 ha)
- Average depth: 11 ft (3.4 m)
- Max. depth: 37 ft (11 m)
- Surface elevation: 348 ft (106 m)

Lake Hayward is a natural spring-fed lake situated just north of Devil's Hopyard State Park in the northeastern corner of East Haddam, Connecticut, and is bordered by the towns of Colchester and Salem.

Lake Hayward, formerly known as Long Pond by the native tribes who inhabited its shores, as well as Newton Pond and Shaw Lake, is now named for Nathaniel Hayward. In 1838, Charles Goodyear, of the Goodyear Tire and Rubber Company, and Nathaniel Hayward were partners in a rubber mill which operated in Massachusetts. In 1847 after breaking away from Goodyear's company, Mr. Hayward established a factory in Colchester, Connecticut to manufacture shoes. Mr. Hayward remained in Colchester, Connecticut, until his death in the 1860s. During the time he was residing in Colchester, he purchased land for hunting along Shaw's pond on the north east edge of East Haddam, Connecticut, where a grist mill was operating. After Nathaniel Hayward's death, Shaw's Pond was renamed Lake Hayward in his honor, as well as Hayward Avenue in Colchester.

Lake Hayward is approximately 1.5 miles (2.4 km) long and 0.5 miles (0.8 km) wide. Its surface area is 174 acres (70 ha), and its elevation is 348 feet (106 m) above sea level. The lake has an average depth of 11 feet (3.4 m) and a maximum depth of 37 feet (11 m).

The lake has four private beaches and does not allow motorboats with gasoline engines. The western side of the lake is overseen and monitored by the local homeowners association, the Property Owners Association of Lake Hayward (POALH). There are both year-round and summer homes in the area.
