= Eight Mile =

Eight Mile, Eightmile, or 8 Mile may refer to:

== Media ==
- 8 Mile (film), a 2002 American film starring rapper Eminem, named after the street in Detroit, Michigan
- 8 Mile: Music from and Inspired by the Motion Picture, rap soundtrack album to the film of the same name, featuring Eminem and others
- "8 Mile", a rap song from the eponymous soundtrack, see 8 Mile (soundtrack)
- "Eight Miles", a science fiction short story by Sean McMullen

== Places ==
=== Australia ===
- Eight Mile Creek (South Australia), a watercourse in the south east of South Australia
  - Eight Mile Creek, South Australia, a locality in the local government area of the District Council of Grant
- Eight Mile Plains, a suburb of Brisbane, Australia
  - Eight Mile Plains busway station

=== Canada ===
- Eight Mile Point, Ontario, a community in Canada

=== China ===
- Eight Mile Bridge, in Beijing, China

=== United States ===
- Eight Mile, Alabama, an unincorporated community in Mobile County, Alabama, United States
- Eightmile, Oregon
- Eightmile Island, in West Virginia
- Eightmile River (Connecticut River)
- 8 Mile Road, or M-102, a road and state highway in the Detroit, Michigan area's Mile Road System

== See also ==
- Eightmile Creek (disambiguation)
- Eight Miles High (disambiguation)
- Eight Mile Road (Ryo Kawasaki album)
