= Millington Green =

Millington Green may refer to:

- Millington, Connecticut, USA, including the Millington Green Historic District
- Millington Green, Derbyshire, a hamlet in Derbyshire, England, forming part of Hulland Ward
