= Franklin Academy =

Franklin Academy may refer to:

- Ben Franklin Academy, DeKalb County, Alabama
- Franklin Academy (Connecticut), East Haddam, Connecticut
- Franklin Academy (Louisiana), a high school in Franklin Parish, Louisiana
- Franklin Academy, now Franklin High School, in Reisterstown, Maryland
- Franklin Academy, Columbus, Mississippi, in the Columbus Municipal School District
- Franklin Academy, a Congregational Church-affiliated secondary school in Franklin, Nebraska
- Franklin Academy (New York) in Malone, New York
- Franklin Academy (North Carolina), Wake Forest, North Carolina
- Franklin Academy, Lancaster, South Carolina; see J. Marion Sims
- Ursula Franklin Academy, Toronto, Ontario
- The original school that later became the University of Pennsylvania in Philadelphia
