= Elizabeth Foster (disambiguation) =

Elizabeth Foster (1756–1824) was a novelist.

Elizabeth Foster may also refer to:

- Elizabeth Foster, a character in The Gathering
- Elizabeth Louisa Foster Mather (1815–1882), American writer
- Liz Foster, a character in The Young and the Restless
