= Venture Smith =

Colonial American enslaved African and author

Venture Smith (Birth name: Broteer Furro) (c. 1729 – 1805) was an African American farmer and craftsman. Smith was kidnapped when he was six and a half years old in West Africa and was taken to Anomabo on the Gold Coast (modern-day Ghana) to be sold into slavery. As an adult, he purchased his freedom and that of his family. He documented his life in A Narrative of the Life and Adventures of Venture, a Native of Africa: But Resident above Sixty Years in the United States of America, Related by Himself. This autobiography is one of the earliest known examples of an autobiographical narrative in an entirely African American literary vericas, only about a dozen left behind first-hand accounts of their experiences.

Smith was renamed "Venture" by Robinson Mumford, his first white enslaver. Mumford decided to call him "Venture" because he considered purchasing him to be a business venture. Mumford bought Venture with four gallons of rum and a piece of calico. After regaining his freedom, Smith adopted his last name from Oliver Smith (the last person to enslave him). In his narrative, Smith describes the people in his native country as generally of great bodily stature, stout, and tall. And he reports that he personally was well over 6 feet 1 1/2 inches (1.87 m) tall, weighed 230 pounds (100 kg), and carried a 9-pound (4.1 kg) axe for felling trees. This is confirmed by the archaeological project in 2007 and the runaway ad from 1754.

Venture Smith died in 1805. He is buried at the First Church of Christ cemetery in East Haddam, Connecticut, now a site on the Connecticut Freedom Trail.

== Smith's autobiographical narrative ==
=== Early life ===
Broteer (Venture Smith) was born in a place he recalls as Dukandarra in "Guinea"—a term that at the time referred to much of West Africa. Dukandarra, argues Chandler B. Saint, a historian with the Documenting Venture Smith Project, was probably in the Savannah region.

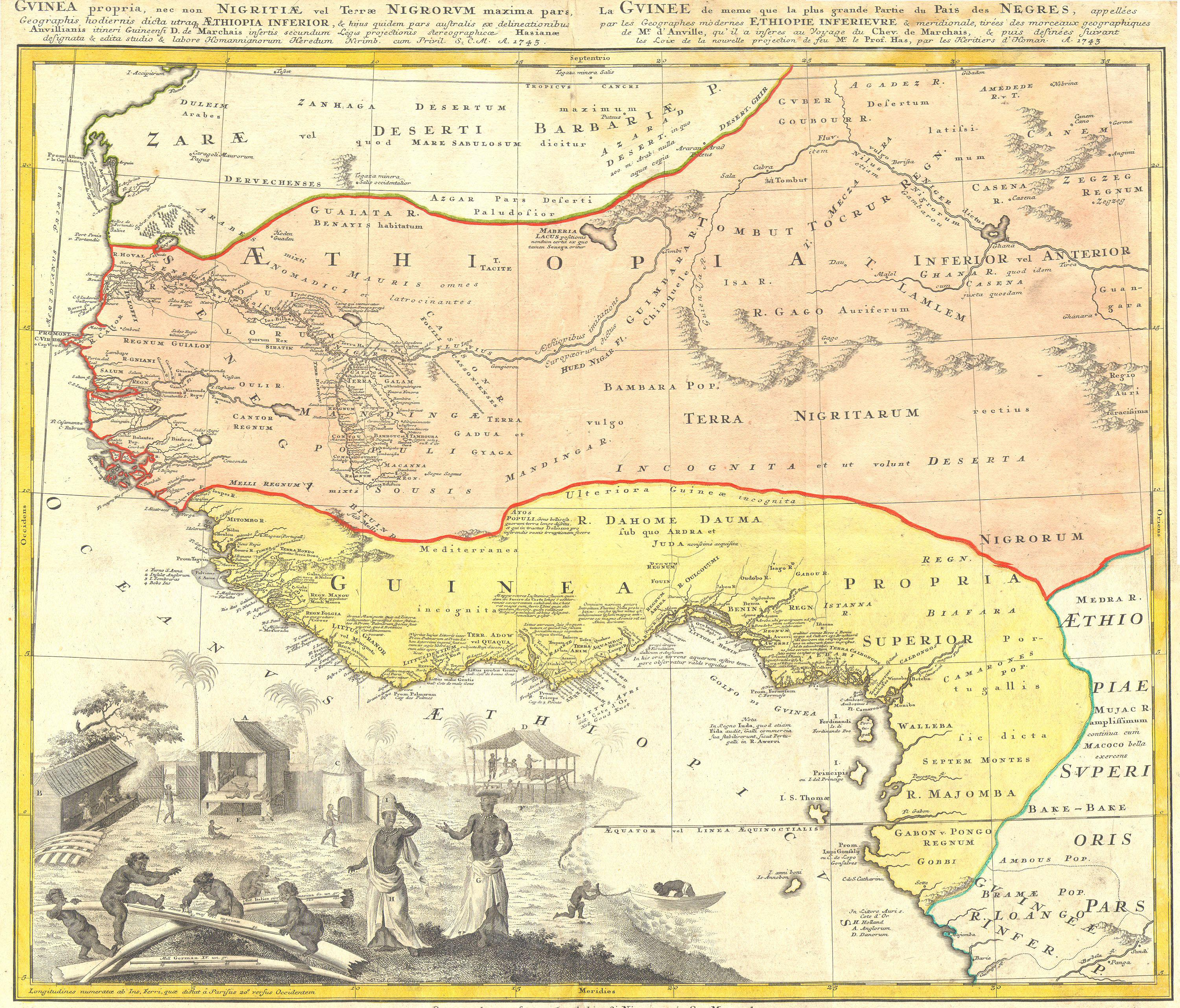
Homann Heirs Map of "Guinea"

His father was Saungm Furro, the prince of Dukandarra. His mother was the first of his three wives, and Broteer was the first of her three children. She left Saungm Furro's village after he married another wife without her permission. However, polygamy was not uncommon in that country, especially among the rich, as every man was allowed to keep as many wives as he could maintain. She took her three children with her. The group traveled 140 miles over four days and relied on foraging for food. The young Broteer was left in the care of a wealthy farmer while his mother was in her home country. While at this farm, Broteer was tasked with caring for the owner's flock of 40 sheep. He remained on the farm for about a year before his father sent an emissary to retrieve him.

Six weeks after he returned to his father's village, Broteer learned that a large, foreign army had invaded the country of the farmer he had just left. The nation had not prepared for war in a long time; hence, the villagers had to evacuate. Saungm Furro agreed to give aid by providing a haven. Shortly after the refugees arrived, an enemy messenger arrived and demanded the payment "of a large sum of money, 300 fat cattle, and a great number of goats, sheep, asses, etc..." The threat of invasion and war was enough for Saugm Furro to agree to the terms.

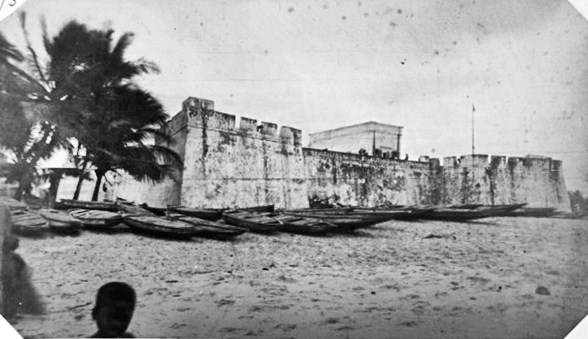
Fort William – the 1890s

Despite paying the enemy what they had asked for, Saungm Furro's village was attacked by 6,000 men. Broteer, his family, and the entire village fled. On the way, Saungm Furro discovered a scouting party of the enemy, and he discharged arrows at them. They were all soon captured. Saungm Furro was interrogated because the invaders knew that he had money. He was tortured to death for refusing to reveal the location of his money. This event stuck with Broteer for the rest of his life: "The shocking scene is to this day fresh in my mind, and I have often been overcome while thinking on it." The invaders forced the captives to march about 1,000 miles to Malagasco and the coast while, at the same time, the raiding force captured more Africans. A local raiding party attacked and defeated the captors in a turn of events. Instead of being set free, he remained in bondage and continued his journey toward the coast and eventually arrived at Anomabu. In the late spring of 1739, a slave ship carrying Smith sailed from Anomabo to Barbados with 260 captives and then to Rhode Island. On board, Broteer was purchased by Robinson Mumford of Rhode Island for four gallons of rum and a piece of calico and renamed "Venture." During the Middle Passage to Barbados, a smallpox outbreak took the lives of 60 of his fellow captives. While most of the surviving captives were sold in Barbados, he was brought to New England.

=== Life in the Americas and death ===
Smith relays in his narrative that upon the ship's arrival in Barbados, all but four of the enslaved persons were sold to Barbadian planters on August 23, 1739. Smith and three others sailed on to Rhode Island, arriving early in the fall of 1739. Afterward, Smith was enslaved at Mumford's residence on Fishers Island, New York. Once there, Mumford forced Smith to work in the household. At this time, he showed his loyalty to his enslaver. When he received the keys to the trunks, he did not give them others, even if the enslaver's father asked him to do so. Because of his work, his enslaver increasingly trusted Smith. He served dutifully and was praised highly after faithfully guarding the contents of his enslaver's chest for an extended period. Nevertheless, Smith was subjected to intense and back-breaking labor at a young age and severe punishments. His enslaver's son, in particular, tormented him and abused him, and at one point, attempted to beat him with a pitchfork and ultimately tied him up and whipped him for his defiance. As he grew older, he endured more arduous tasks and severe punishments.

In his narrative, Smith recalls his initial experience with his first "white master", who possessed abundant fertile land near the river.^{What river?} He mentions how his enslaver had a tender heart and treated him well, and the enslaver's son and Smith even had something similar to friendship. At 22, Smith married an enslaved woman named Meg (Margaret). Shortly thereafter, on March 27, 1754, he made an escape attempt, convinced to take flight by an Irish indentured servant named Heddy and two other people Mumford enslaved. During their escape, at Montauk Point, Long Island, Heddy revealed his true intentions and attempted to steal their supplies and belongings. After discovering this betrayal, Smith and his compatriots hunted down and captured Heddy and returned him to his enslaver, receiving a warm welcome and appreciation for their efforts.

In 1754, Smith and his wife had a daughter called Hannah. Less than a month later, Smith's enslaver forcefully separated him from his family, selling Smith to Thomas Stanton in Stonington, Connecticut. They were reunited the following year when Stanton bought Meg and Hannah. Smith began saving money he had earned from working outside jobs and selling produce he grew; he hoped to purchase freedom for his family. His time enslaved by Stanton began peacefully, but he was thrown into discord after Smith found his wife and Stanton's wife in a heated dispute, with the latter beating upon the former with a switch. When Smith tried to break up the fight, Mrs. Stanton turned the switch upon him, so Smith took it from her grasp and threw it into the fire. In retaliation, Thomas Stanton attacked Smith with a boat oar. After fending off this attack, a vexed Smith went to local authorities to complain about his abuse. Stanton and his brother, who had come to do violence unto Smith for his rebellion, received a harsh warning and were publicly humiliated. In revenge for this, the brothers once again assaulted Smith once they were out of sight of the courthouse and were once again overcome and repulsed by Smith.

I became enraged at this and immediately turned them both under me, laid one of them across the other, and stamped both with my feet what I would. This occasioned my master's brother to advise him to put me off.

Due to this tumultuous series of events, Smith determined to liberate himself from the Stantons. The Smiths had two more children, Solomon in 1756 and Cuff in 1761. Smith was sold twice more. In 1760, he ended up enslaved by Col. Oliver Smith, who agreed to let him buy his freedom. Smith let Venture work for money when his labor was not required at home. Venture Smith tried to earn money by going out to work. Finally, in the spring of 1765, Venture Smith purchased his freedom for 71 pounds and two shillings, a notably exorbitant price.

=== A free man ===
Smith moved to Long Island. In 1769, after cutting wood and investing the money he made, Smith purchased his sons, Solomon and Cuff. He earned money to purchase his sons by cutting and cording wood, which he said he did upward of 400 cords and threshed out 75 bushels of grain over six months. To purchase his sons, he paid 200 dollars (each). He then purchased an enslaved Black man for 40 pounds and gave him 60 pounds, but the man ran away, still owing Smith 40 pounds.

He hired out Solomon, his oldest son, to Charles Church for one year to be paid 12 pounds. Solomon, being 17 years of age and an able body, was, as dictated by Smith, "all my hope and dependence for help." During his year of employment, Church had outfitted a whaling boat and convinced the young Solomon to join, and in return, he would be compensated with his normal wages and a bonus of a pair of silver buckles. When Smith caught word of the expedition, he set off to stop his son from putting out to sea, but when he arrived at Church's house, he could only see the boat on the horizon. Smith would never again see his oldest son because while on the expedition, he caught scurvy and died.

Soon after the death of his son, Smith purchased his wife for 40 pounds. He did this expeditiously as she was then pregnant with his unborn child. If she had given birth before he was able to purchase her, he would have had to buy both his wife and his child separately. After welcoming another son, Smith named him Solomon in memory of his deceased eldest son.

Smith experienced multiple financial and personal setbacks. He bought an enslaved Black man for 400 dollars. However, he wanted to return to his old enslaver, so Smith released him. Venture Smith purchased another enslaved Black man for 25 pounds. After his daughter, Hannah, was married, she became ill. However, her husband did not pay adequate attention to her health. Although Smith nursed her, she died. In addition, two people he enslaved ran away. In his early sixties, he was unjustly charged with the loss of a white man's property and charged for ten pounds while visiting New London. Although absent from the scene with witnesses, he was still prosecuted. Smith then carried this matter to other courts, claiming his innocence, but the judgment was never reversed. This misleading judgment was made out of discrimination against Black people. Remembering this experience, he said: "Captain Hart was a white gentleman, and I a poor African, therefore it was all right, and good enough for the black dog. "

In 1775, Smith bought a farm at Haddam Neck, on the Salmon River, in Connecticut. By 1778, he had expanded the initial 10 acres to form a farm of at least 130 acres. Additionally, he made a living by fishing, whaling, farming his land, and trading in the Long Island basin. He lived the remainder of his life at Haddam Neck.

In 1798, Smith dictated his life experiences and, with his family, had it printed by The Bee in New London, CT. By this time, Venture was showing the signs of his old age: his strong, tall body was bowed, and he was going blind. The narrative has been the subject of some contention, regarded in many instances as "whitewashed" and inauthentic. It was suspected that the white editor manipulated Smith's story, a common practice among editors of slave narratives. After four conferences and numerous scholarly papers, most scholars and the Documenting Venture Smith Project conclude that the Narrative is entirely Venture Smith's own words. The work is titled A Narrative of the Life and Adventures of Venture, a Native of Africa: But Resident above Sixty Years in the United States of America.

== Film, media, and popular culture ==
He is referenced in the 1971 film Let's Scare Jessica to Death, by the title character, who makes a gravestone rubbing of Smith's headstone and later reads it to her husband.

Smith was featured in the 1996 PBS television documentary series "Africans in America" and was the subject of a 2006 USA Today newspaper story.

Saidiya Hartman cites Venture Smith's narrative in her book, Lose Your Mother. She uses Smith's account to illustrate how rare it is for anyone to describe "the castle" at Anomabo where Smith was held until, he writes, "I and other prisoners were put on board a canoe, under our master, and rowed away to a vessel belonging to Rhode-Island, commanded by capt. Collingwood."

Russell Shorto's 2017 book, Revolution Song contains a chapter detailing Smith's life story.

Because Venture Smith's last enslaver, Oliver Smith, was an ancestor of guest Ted Danson, Venture was mentioned on the PBS television show Finding Your Roots with Henry Louis Gates Jr., Season 4, Episode 3 "Puritans and Pioneers" which aired in 2017.

The autobiography is also mentioned in Percival Everett's novel James (2024), a re-imagining of Mark Twain's Adventures of Huckleberry Finn. In Chapter 15, James (the novel's central character) refers to the book, which he had rescued earlier from a wrecked steamboat. "And my books, once read, were not what I wanted, not what I needed. The so-called self related story of Venture Smith became more infuriating the more I examined the work, wondering how a five-year-old could have remembered so much detail that made such neat sense. I had already come to understand the tidiness of lies, the lesson learned from the stories told by white people seeking to justify my circumstance."

== See also ==
- List of enslaved people
