= John Gardner Griffin =

American politician (1815–1904)

John Gardner Griffin (October 30, 1815 – September 13, 1904) was a member of the Wisconsin State Assembly.

== Biography ==
Griffin was born on October 30, 1815, in East Haddam, Connecticut. On March 27, 1841, he married Ursula Mack. They had three children. Griffin settled on a farm in Courtland, Wisconsin, that had been owned by his father, Nathan. Nathan Griffin was Supervisor and Chairman of Courtland and a Commissioner of Columbia County, Wisconsin. Griffin was a Methodist.

== Political career ==
Griffin was a Republican member of the Assembly during the Legislature of 1876. Previously a Free Soiler, he was twice a candidate for the Connecticut General Assembly. Other positions he held include justice of the peace.
