= Little Haddam Historic District =

Historic district in Connecticut, United States

- U.S. National Register of Historic Places
- U.S. Historic district
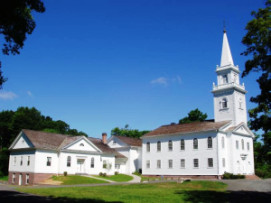
- First Church of Christ, Congregational

- Location within Connecticut Location within the United States
- Location: Roughly bounded by East Haddam Road, Orchard Road, and Town Street, East Haddam, Connecticut
- Coordinates: 41°28′44″N 72°26′48″W
- Area: 75 acres (30 ha)
- Built: 1794
- Architect: Fillmore, Lavius
- Architectural style: Colonial, Federal, Greek Revival
- NRHP reference No.: 96000783
- Added to NRHP: August 1, 1996

The Little Haddam Historic District is a historic district encompassing a rural village center at Orchard and Town Roads in the town of East Haddam, Connecticut. The area was settled early in the town's colonial history and served as its town center into the 19th century. It retains some of its oldest surviving buildings, dating to the 18th and early 19th centuries. The district was listed on the National Register of Historic Places in 1996.

== Description and history ==
East Haddam was originally part of Haddam, from which it is separated by the Connecticut River. It was settled in the 1670s, and its first colonial meeting house was built in Little Haddam in 1704. The town was separately incorporated in 1734. Little Haddam served as the town center, but was later supplanted by locations on the river, where early economic activity was significant, and by Moodus, which developed as an industrial and economic center in the 19th century. It retained some significance in the late 19th century with the introduction of the Grange.

The district is centered at the junction of Orchard and Town Roads, which was the site of East Haddam's first church. The present church was built in 1794, and is a good example of Federal period architecture. Other civic buildings include a hall used for town meetings which was purpose-built in 1857, and the Grange hall, which was built in 1905. Residential architecture of note dates back as far as about 1702, with well-preserved examples of houses from the colonial and Federal period predominating.

== See also ==
- National Register of Historic Places listings in Middlesex County, Connecticut
