= Eight Miles High (disambiguation) =

"Eight Miles High" is a 1966 The Byrds song.

Eight Miles High may also refer to:

- Eight Miles High (album), 1969 Golden Earring album
- Eight Miles High (film), 2007 German film

== See also ==
- Eightmile (disambiguation)
