= Leesville, Connecticut =

- Unincorporated community
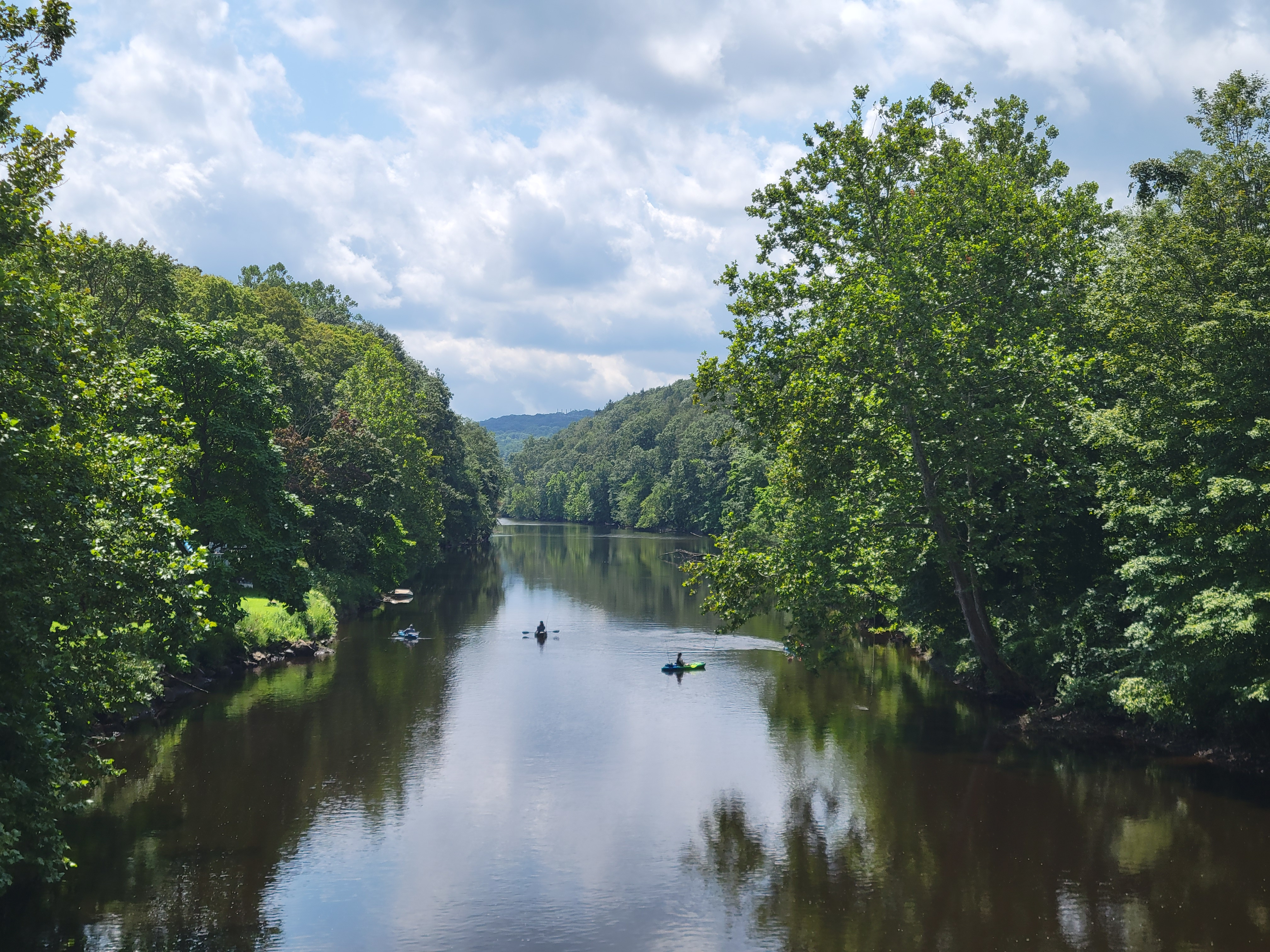
- Salmon River in Leesville

- Location within Connecticut Location within the United States
- Coordinates: 41°30′42″N 72°28′52″W
- Country: United States
- State: Connecticut
- County: Middlesex
- Town: East Haddam
- Elevation: 33 ft (10 m)
- Time zone: UTC-5 (Eastern (EST))
  - Summer (DST): UTC-4 (EDT)
- Area code: 860
- GNIS feature ID: 212495

Leesville is a village in the town of East Haddam, Middlesex County, Connecticut, United States, on Connecticut Route 151, north of the town center. It was originally named Lord's Mills after a local vegetable oil watermill, the first in Connecticut.
