= Devil's Hopyard State Park =

State park in Connecticut, United States

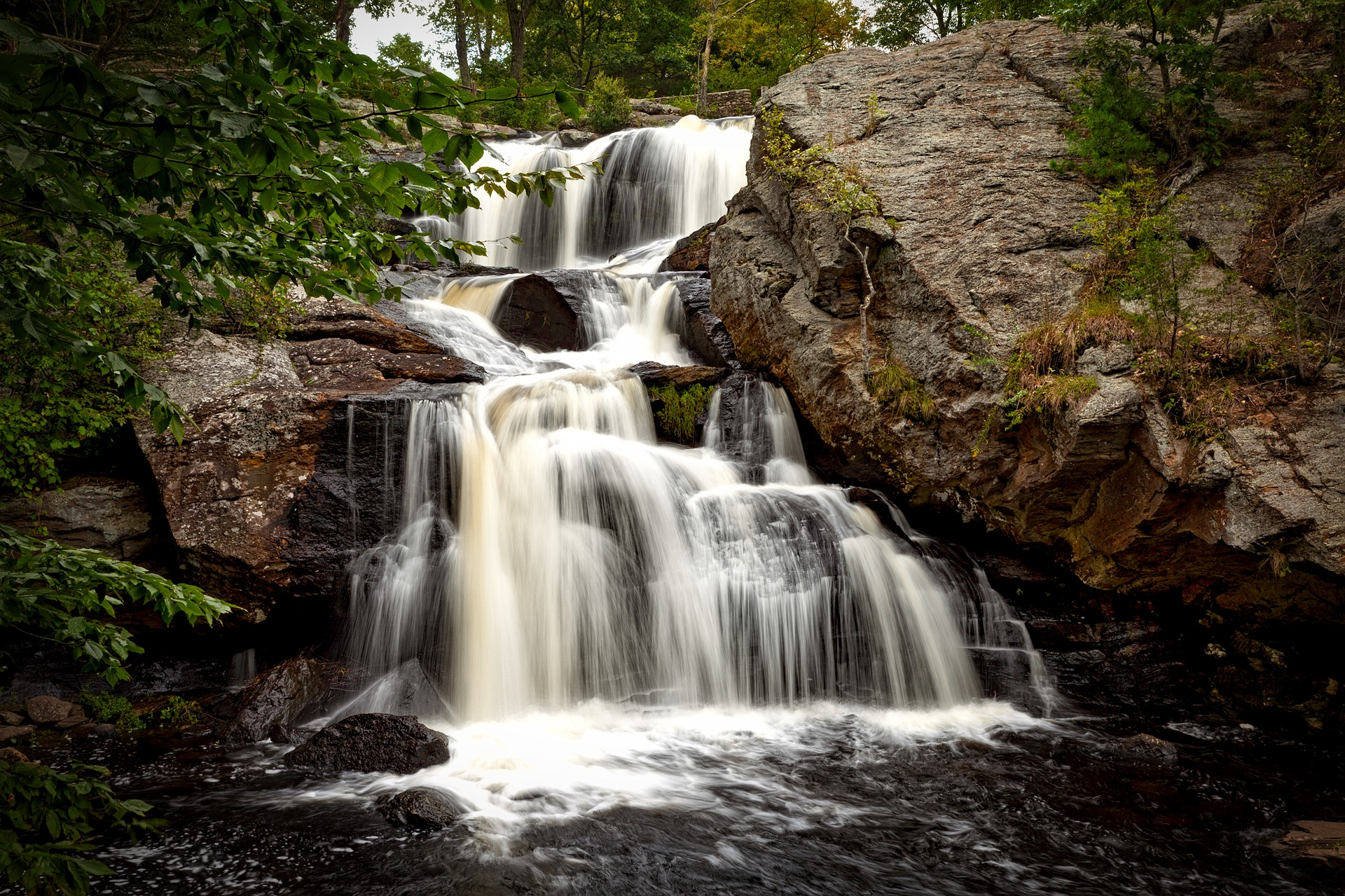
- Chapman Falls

- Location within Connecticut Location within the United States
- Location: East Haddam, Connecticut, United States
- Coordinates: 41°29′00″N 72°20′26″W
- Area: 1,000 acres (400 ha)
- Elevation: 210 ft (64 m)
- Established: 1919
- Administrator: Connecticut Department of Energy and Environmental Protection
- Designation: Connecticut state park
- Website: Official website

Devil's Hopyard State Park is a public recreation area located at the Eightmile River's Chapman Falls in the town of East Haddam, Connecticut. The 1,000-acre (400 ha) state park includes facilities for hiking, fishing, bicycling, picnicking, and camping. It is managed by the Connecticut Department of Energy and Environmental Protection.

== History ==
The park was the site of an attack by the Sons of Liberty, in 1775, on a mill owned by pro-British loyalists. After a portion of the broken millstone was found at the foot of the falls in 2002, a park sign was erected to present details of the story.

The park's falls powered "Beebe's Mills" (named after the original owner) until the 1890s. The site was acquired by the state for use as a state park in 1919 at the prodding of A.G. Willard, a resident of Colchester who had expressed her concern with the extent of logging operations taking place in the area.

== Name ==
At some time prior to 1800, there was a malt house on George Griffin's farm near a small tributary of the Eightmile River called Malt House Brook. The malt house was abandoned prior to 1814, but during the period of its operation Griffin grew hops in a small clearing—the "hopyard"—beside the road running through the area now called Devil's Hopyard.

There are a number of theories as to why the area was named “Devil's” Hopyard, ranging from a landowner named Dibble to supernatural explanations for the naturally occurring potholes near the falls. A sign in the park has more on the legends of the etymology of the park's name.

== Attractions ==
The principal feature of the park, Chapman Falls, drops more than 60 feet (18 m) over a series of steps in a Scotland schist stone formation. The Vista Point cliff, located at the end of the Orange Trail, stands 150 to 175 feet (53 m) above the Eightmile River. Other attractions include "mini falls" and three historic highway bridges listed on the National Register of Historic Places.

== In the news ==
On March 26, 2012, a large brush fire struck the park. Efforts by firefighters from fourteen towns included burning out the area behind two threatened households. The fire consumed more than fifty acres over two days before authorities let it burn itself out. Officials proposed hikers as a possible cause of the blaze. Six to 12 inches of soot, ash and other residue filled the area for some time thereafter.

== See also ==
- List of waterfalls
