= Eightmile Creek (Georgia) =

Stream in Georgia, U.S.

Coordinates: 32°58′11″N 82°07′08″W

Eightmile Creek is a stream in the U.S. state of Georgia. It is a tributary to Buckhead Creek.

Eightmile Creek is approximately 8 miles (13 km) long, hence the name. A variant name is "Eight Mile Creek".
