= Franklin Academy (Connecticut) =

Location
- 140 River Road; East Haddam, Connecticut 06423; United States; 41°26′26″N 72°26′06″W

Information
- Type: Private boarding secondary
- Motto: Belong, Grow, Succeed
- Established: 2001 (25 years ago)
- Founder: Fred Weissbach
- CEEB code: 070166
- Head of school: Dr. Alexander Morris-Wood
- Grades: 8-PG
- Gender: Co-educational
- Enrollment: 105
- Mascot: Phoenix
- Accreditation: New England Association of Schools and Colleges
- Website: www.fa-ct.org

Franklin Academy is a co-educational college-preparatory boarding and day school in East Haddam, Connecticut, serving students in grades 8-12 as well as post-graduate students.

== Description ==
Franklin's academic program includes core courses, electives, honors coursework and support for executive functioning and academic skills. Students can earn college credit through University of Connecticut Early College Experience courses.

The school uses a dyadic advising model in which each student has an academic advisor and a student life advisor. Together, the advisors support executive functioning, social decision-making, self-advocacy and academic skills. Academic advisors used grade-based benchmarks to assess student development and communicate with families about academic progress.

Franklin's four-year college and career readiness curriculum addresses self-awareness, executive functioning, problem solving and self-advocacy. The school offers college counseling and transition planning.

Franklin College Connections is the school's postgraduate program for neurodivergent students. It combines college coursework or internships with support for academic readiness, executive functioning, social integration and independent living.

Franklin Academy is accredited by the New England Association of Schools and Colleges, and is also a member of the National Association of Independent Schools.

== History ==
Sketch of Becket Academy c. 1971 showing various campus buildings, roads, and other complexes.

The East Haddam property on which Franklin Academy's campus is located previously had been home to three other institutions: Becket Academy, established in 1964 as a residential school for boys; Founders School; and Haddam Hills Academy for juvenile offenders.

In November 2001, Franklin Academy was incorporated by John Claude Bahrenburg and Albert Brayson, leaders of the former Haddam Hills. Initially, "business partners intend to open Franklin Academy without seeking state approval", according to Hartford Courant reporting. Preparations for opening began with an administrative team in 2002, with founding headmaster Frederick Weissbach. After the Connecticut State Department of Education granted approval to operate, the school spent $2.5 million on campus facilities.

On February 22, 2021, Franklin Academy and its headmaster were sued for alleged racism. The case was settled for an undisclosed amount. The school's legal issues are documented on Unsilenced, a non-profit website.

In 2022, Tom Hays became director of Franklin Academy, with Fred Weissbach taking the role of president. On November 2, 2023, the Board of Trustees announced retirements of Fred Weissbach and Tom Hays at the end of the school year, and the appointment of Alex Morris-Wood as Head of School on July 1, 2024.

In September 2026, Franklin Academy announced the selection of the Hartford-based Tecton Architects to develop a campus master plan.

== Enrollment ==
Franklin Academy opened in September 2003 with an enrollment of 33 students. Enrollment has increased to 57 students in 2005, and 68 in 2006. In 2020, the school enrolled 76 students. The school opened the 2026-2027 academic year with 105 students, it's largest opening enrollment to date.
