= E. Louisa Mather =

19th-century American writer

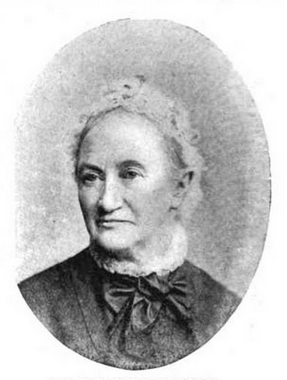
- Born: Elizabeth Louisa Foster; January 7, 1815; East Haddam, Connecticut, U.S.
- Died: February 5, 1882 (aged 67)
- Resting place: Hungerford Cemetery, East Haddam
- Spouse: Eleazer Watrous Mather (m. 1837)

Elizabeth Louisa Mather (née Foster; January 7, 1815 – February 5, 1882) was an American writer from Connecticut. A relative of Miles Standish, she converted to Universalism after her marriage. She was a prolific writer for 40 years, contributing essays, stories, and poems to various periodicals. Her writing often addressed religious subjects, capital punishment, and woman's suffrage.

== Biography ==
Elizabeth Louisa Foster was born in East Haddam, Connecticut on January 7, 1815. On her maternal side, she was a relative of Mrs. Abel C. Thomas. Mather was baptized in the Episcopal Church, of which her parents were members. Her grandfather was Joel Foster, A. M. Her father came from Massachusetts, and settled in Connecticut in 1809 or 1810. The family traces its descent from Miles Standish, of Plymouth Colony, on the father's side. On June 18, 1837, she married Eleazer Watrous Mather (1812–1887), of East Haddam. He was a farmer. In the early days of her marriage, her husband took the Universalist Union, and the writings of Julia H. Scott held Mather's attention. Mather became a convert to Universalism soon after her husband did so.

Mather wrote essays, stories and poems for Ladies' Repository from 1847 to 1874, as well as for the Universalist Union, Trumpet, Ambassador, Golden Hide, and Odd Fellows' Offering. Mary Livermore invited Mather to write for the Lily of the Valley. She wrote for 40 years, on religious subjects, capital punishment, and woman's suffrage.

There were at least three children from the marriage, Kate Louise Mather Warner, Nathan Augustus Mather, and Fannie Foster Mather Dickinson. Mather endured two weeks of severe suffering before she died February 5, 1882, and was buried at the Hungerford Cemetery in East Haddam.

From Hadlyme hills, poems and prose by E. Louisa Mather (1956) is a compilation work by her granddaughter, M. Catherine Dickinson Writer and her great-granddaughter, Priscilla Wright Pratt.

E. Louisa Mather died February 5, 1882.
