= Eightmile Creek (Fifteenmile Creek tributary) =

- Location within Oregon

Location
- Country: United States
- State: Oregon
- County: Wasco

Physical characteristics
- Source: Cascade Range
  - coordinates: 45°21′38″N 121°30′25″W
- Mouth: Fifteenmile Creek
  - location: Petersburg (vicinity)
  - coordinates: 45°36′22″N 121°05′10″W
  - elevation: 259 ft (79 m)

Eightmile Creek is a stream in Wasco County and Hood River County, Oregon, in the United States. It is a tributary of Fifteenmile Creek.

Eightmile Creek was named from its distance, eight miles (13 km) from The Dalles.
