= Millington, Connecticut =

- Millington Green Historic District
- U.S. National Register of Historic Places
- U.S. Historic district
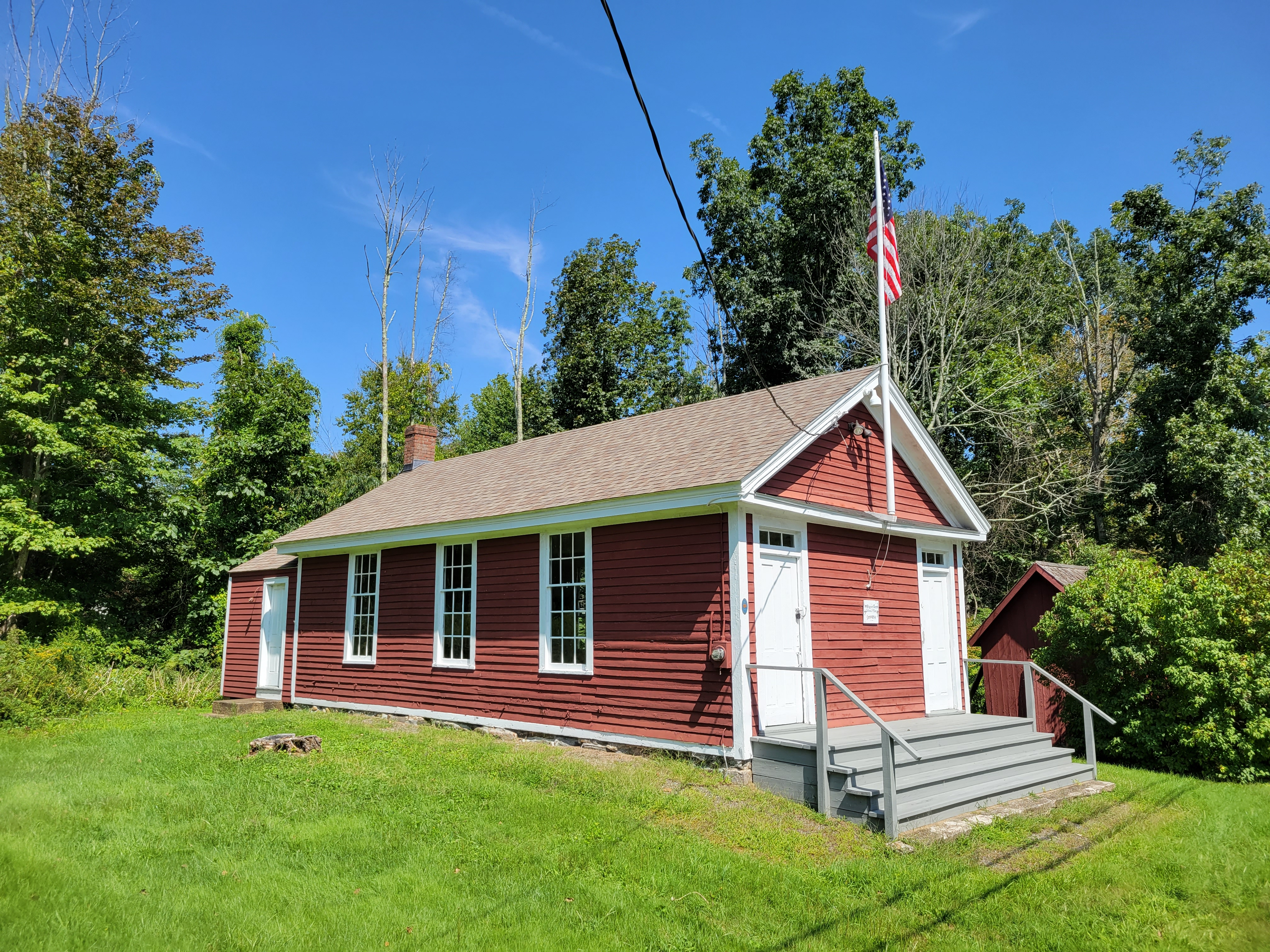
- 10th District Schoolhouse

- Location within Connecticut Location within the United States
- Location: Roughly bounded by Millington, Tater Hill, Haywardville, and Old Hopyard Roads, East Haddam, Connecticut
- Coordinates: 41°29.1′N 72°21.5′W
- Built: 1854
- Architectural style: Colonial, Greek Revival
- NRHP reference No.: 96000782
- Added to NRHP: July 25, 1996

Millington is a village within the town of East Haddam, Connecticut, United States. Millington lies halfway between East Haddam center and Salem center. It is the section of East Haddam that is the closest to Devil's Hopyard State Park. The village is connected to East Haddam Center and to Devil's Hopyard State Park by a series of secondary roads that are maintained by the state. The road is given an unsigned designation "Special Service Road 434", which runs on Mount Parnassus Road, Millington Road, Haywardville Road, and Hopyard Road.

Millington includes the Millington Green Historic District which was listed on the National Register of Historic Places in 1996.

The village is the site of the Millington Green, a small triangular town green in the center of the village at the junction of Millington, Haywardville, and Tater Hill roads. The Green contains a flagpole, bench, and perennial flower garden and is surrounded by several historic houses, including the Daniel Bulkeley House (built in 1792), the 10th District Schoolhouse (built in 1854), the Millington Green Parsonage (built in 1854), the Julius Schwab House (built in 1950 but incorporating a schoolhouse from 1756), and the Ebenezer Dutton House (built in 1766).

Millington was first settled in 1704 by Jonathan Beebe of New London. An ecclesiastical society separate from Haddam (East Haddam was then part of Haddam) was granted in 1733. The congregational church was organized in 1736 and a meetinghouse constructed on the Green in 1740. The village became a training area for the local militia during the Revolutionary War. The village never recovered from a depression following the War of 1812 and is now a rural residential neighborhood.

== See also ==
- National Register of Historic Places listings in Middlesex County, Connecticut
