= Eightmile Creek (Minnesota River tributary) =

Tributary in Minnesota, United States

Coordinates: 44°22′53″N 94°35′34″W

Eightmile Creek is a stream in the U.S. state of Minnesota. It is a tributary of Minnesota River.

Eightmile Creek was so named from its distance, eight miles (13 km) from Fort Ridgely.

== See also ==
- List of rivers of Minnesota
