= East Haddam, Connecticut =

- Town
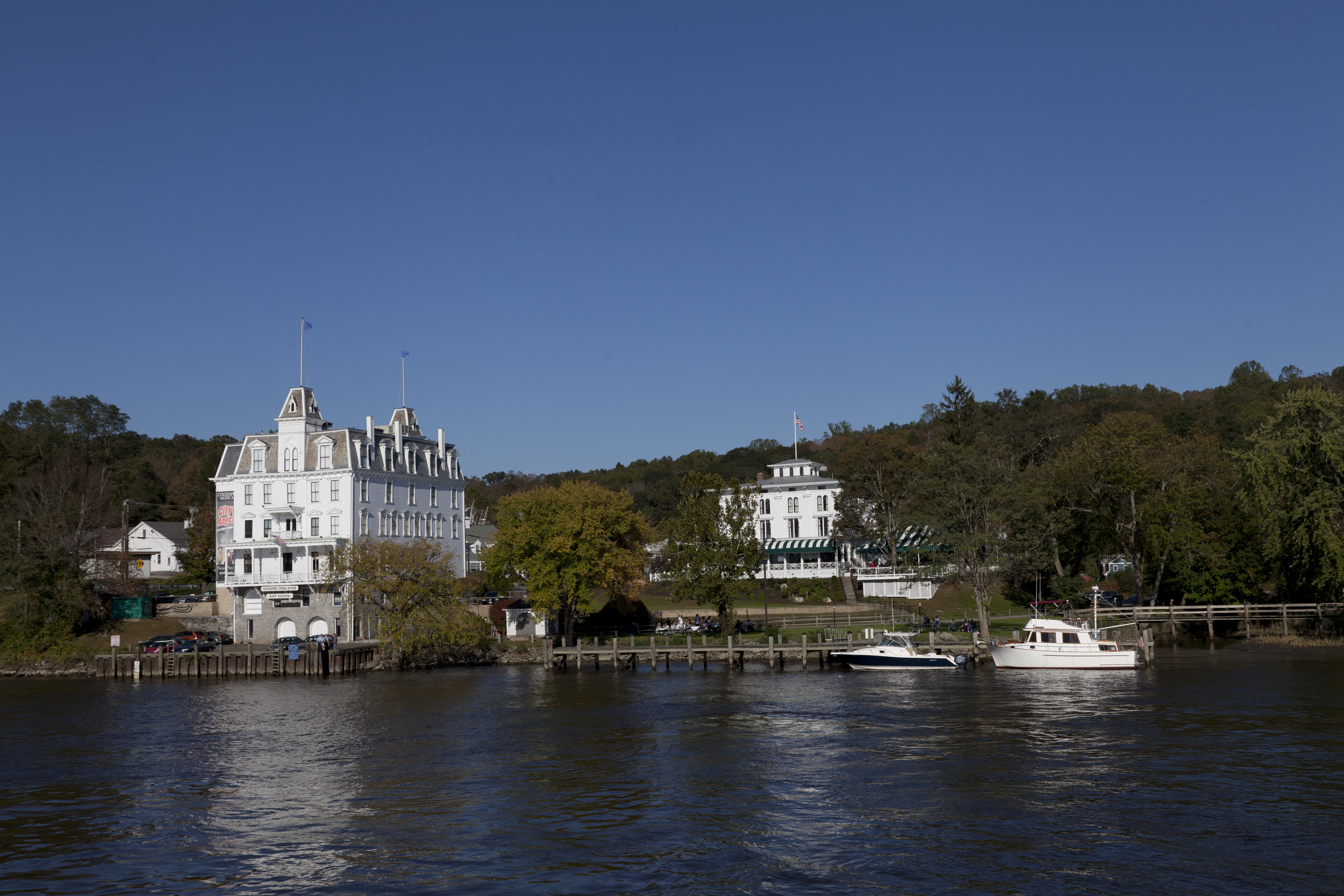
- View of the Goodspeed Opera House (left) and Gelston House (right) from the Connecticut River

- Seal
- Interactive map of East Haddam, Connecticut
- Coordinates: 41°28′47″N 72°23′40″W
- Country: United States
- U.S. state: Connecticut
- County: Middlesex
- Region: Lower CT River Valley
- Incorporated: 1734

Government
  - Type: Selectman–town meeting
  - First selectman: Irene M. Haines (R)

Area
  - Total: 56.6 sq mi (146.6 km^{2})
  - Land: 54.3 sq mi (140.7 km^{2})
  - Water: 2.2 sq mi (5.8 km^{2})
- Elevation: 535 ft (163 m)

Population (2020)
  - Total: 8,875
  - Density: 163.4/sq mi (63.1/km^{2})
- Demonym: East Haddamite
- Time zone: UTC-5 (Eastern)
  - Summer (DST): UTC-4 (Eastern)
- ZIP code: 06423, 06469
- Area codes: 860/959
- FIPS code: 09-22280
- GNIS feature ID: 0213422
- Website: www.easthaddam.org

East Haddam is a town in Middlesex County, Connecticut, United States. The town is part of the Lower Connecticut River Valley Planning Region. The population was 8,875 at the time of the 2020 census. It includes summer resorts, historical sites, and natural areas.

== History ==
Until 1650, the area of East Haddam was inhabited by at least three Indigenous peoples: the Wangunk, the Mohegan and the Niantic. The Indigenous nations called the area "Machimoodus", the place of noises, because of numerous earthquakes that were recorded between 1638 and 1899. Loud rumblings, the "Moodus Noises", could be heard for miles surrounding the epicenter of the quakes near Mt. Tom. The land, which is now Haddam and East Haddam, was purchased by settlers from the natives in 1662 for thirty coats, worth about $100.

Layout of the highways began in 1669 with Creek Row about ¼ mile east of the River and Town Street “The Great Highway” about ¼ mile east of Creek Row. The first permanent settlers established homesteads along Creek Row in 1685. By 1700, there were thirty families living in East Haddam. Agricultural and timber farming, shipbuilding, tanneries and blacksmiths were among the early commerce. Captain John Chapman began ferry service across the Connecticut River in 1695, which ended with the completion of the swing bridge in 1913.

East Haddam was incorporated as a separate town from Haddam in 1734. By 1756, there were nearly 2,000 residents, with the Millington District as the most populated. Growth of commerce brought a surge in population to around 3,000 people by the mid-1800s. In the nineteenth century, Moodus was the “Twine Capital of America,” with twelve mills in operation. In the winter of 1773, American patriot Nathan Hale briefly taught in a one-room schoolhouse in East Haddam which is now a living history museum operated by Connecticut Society of the Sons of the American Revolution.

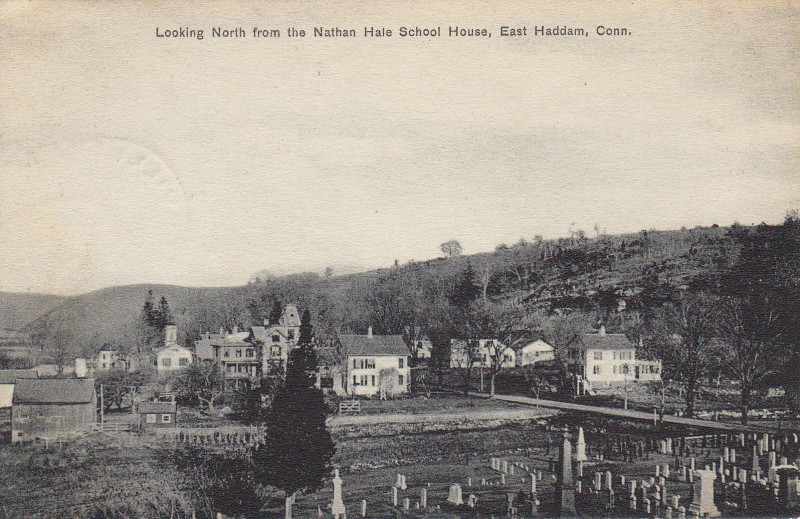
Looking north from the Nathan Hale Schoolhouse, 1919

Visitors and residents such as actor William Gillette whose castle home was completed in 1914, were drawn to the area known for its rural charm and natural scenery. The growth of the resort areas of Lake Hayward, Bashan Lake and Moodus Reservoir began in the early 1900s and was a booming business for the next fifty years. Lake Hayward is a small private lake community within East Haddam that is home to around 120 families, most living at the lake only during summer months.

East Haddam was listed as one of the 52 Places to Love in 2021 by The New York Times.

== Geography ==
According to the United States Census Bureau, the town has a total area of 56.6 square miles (147 km^{2}), of which 54.3 square miles (141 km^{2}) is land and 2.2 square miles (5.7 km^{2}) (3.96%) is water.

=== Principal communities ===
- Bashan
- East Haddam Center
- Hadlyme
- Leesville
- Little Haddam
- Millington
- Moodus
- North Plain

== Demographics ==
Historical population
Census	Pop.	Note	%±
1790	2,749		—
1800	2,805		2.0%
1810	2,537		−9.6%
1820	2,572		1.4%
1830	2,664		3.6%
1840	2,620		−1.7%
1850	2,610		−0.4%
1860	3,056		17.1%
1870	2,951		−3.4%
1880	3,032		2.7%
1890	2,599		−14.3%
1900	2,485		−4.4%
1910	2,422		−2.5%
1920	2,312		−4.5%
1930	2,114		−8.6%
1940	2,217		4.9%
1950	2,554		15.2%
1960	3,637		42.4%
1970	4,676		28.6%
1980	5,621		20.2%
1990	6,676		18.8%
2000	8,333		24.8%
2010	9,126		9.5%
2020	8,875		−2.8%
U.S. Decennial Census

As of the census of 2000, there were 8,333 people, 3,174 households, and 2,285 families residing in the town. The population density was 153.4 inhabitants per square mile (59.2/km^{2}). There were 4,015 housing units at an average density of 73.9 per square mile (28.5/km^{2}). The racial makeup of the town was 97.26% White, 0.84% African American, 0.28% Native American, 0.40% Asian, 0.46% from other races, and 0.77% from two or more races. Hispanic or Latino of any race were 0.98% of the population.

There were 3,174 households, out of which 35.2% had children under the age of 18 living with them, 62.3% were married couples living together, 6.9% had a female householder with no husband present, and 28.0% were non-families. 21.4% of all households were made up of individuals, and 8.1% had someone living alone who was 65 years of age or older. The average household size was 2.58 and the average family size was 3.02.

In the town, the population was spread out, with 25.5% under the age of 18, 4.8% from 18 to 24, 33.3% from 25 to 44, 25.8% from 45 to 64, and 10.6% who were 65 years of age or older. The median age was 38 years. For every 100 females, there were 100.1 males. For every 100 females age 18 and over, there were 96.2 males.

The median income for a household in the town was $62,304, and the median income for a family was $70,091. Males had a median income of $45,500 versus $36,055 for females. The per capita income for the town was $28,112. About 1.0% of families and 2.9% of the population were below the poverty line, including 1.5% of those under age 18 and 1.5% of those age 65 or over. 2017 CERT Town Profile, click here.

== Politics ==
Voter Registration and Party Enrollment as of October 25, 2005
Party	Active Voters	Inactive Voters	Total Voters	Percentage
Democratic	1,529	91	1,620	28.72%
Republican	1,181	56	1,237	21.93%
Unaffiliated	2,598	179	2,777	49.24%
Minor parties	5	1	6	0.11%
Total	5,313	327	5,640	100%

Presidential Election Results
Year	Democratic	Republican	Third Parties
2020	51.2% 2,980	46.9% 2,731	1.9% 114
2016	45.9% 2,331	49.0% 2,487	5.1% 259
2012	53.0% 2,471	45.2% 2,109	1.8% 82
2008	58.9% 2,874	39.3% 1,918	1.8% 87
2004	55.4% 2,607	42.7% 2,009	1.9% 89
2000	52.8% 2,186	40.7% 1,687	6.5% 271
1996	45.4% 1,663	32.6% 1,193	22.0% 804
1992	37.3% 1,468	26.5% 1,042	36.2% 1,427
1988	45.5% 1,457	53.1% 1,702	1.4% 44
1984	36.9% 1,112	62.7% 1,885	0.4% 11
1980	38.9% 1,104	46.6% 1,324	14.5% 413
1976	50.4% 1,308	49.3% 1,280	0.3% 9
1972	41.2% 968	57.6% 1,353	1.2% 28
1968	49.1% 1,028	44.1% 922	6.8% 143
1964	67.3% 1,243	32.7% 605	0.00% 0
1960	50.2% 930	49.8% 921	0.00% 0
1956	38.1% 647	61.9% 1,049	0.00% 0

== Education ==
=== Public ===
The East Haddam Public School System has about 1,100 students in grades Pre-K–12; about 121 certified teachers, 70 support staff and 7 administrators. Ms. Teresa DeBrito is superintendent of schools. Located in Moodus, Connecticut, the three schools in the public school system are:

- Nathan Hale-Ray High School (grades 9–12) – about 418 students
- Nathan Hale-Ray Middle School (Grades 4–8) – about 573 students
- East Haddam Elementary School (Grades Pre-K–3) – about 430 students

=== Private ===
- Franklin Academy – "A Boarding and Day School for Students with Nonverbal Learning Differences in grades 8–12", according to the school's Web site. The private, nonprofit school was opened in 2003 and has a campus of 75 acres (300,000 m^{2}).

== Attractions ==
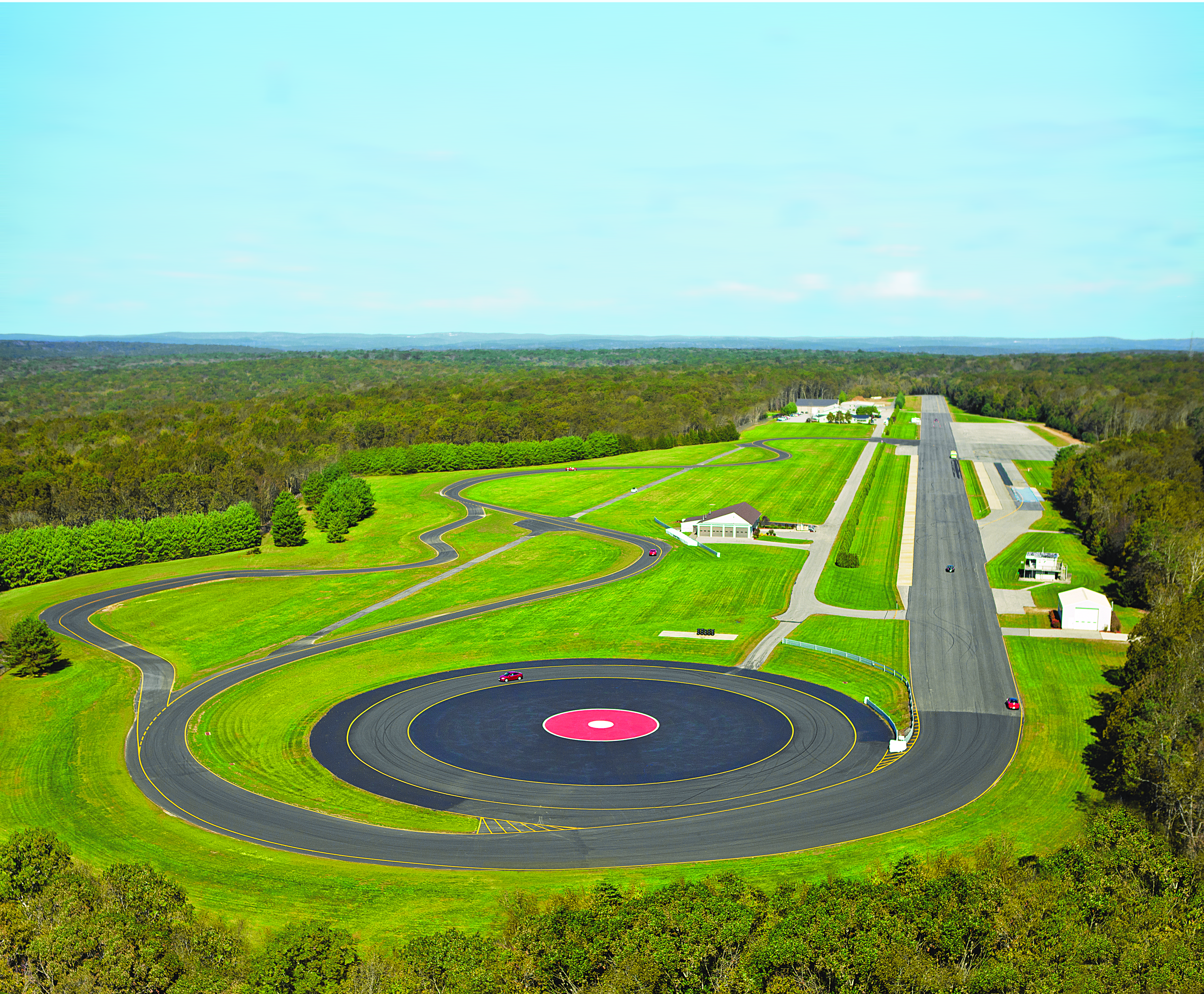
An auto test track in East Haddam

=== Cultural ===
- East Haddam Libraries – two public libraries, The East Haddam Free Public Library] (18 Plains Rd, Moodus) and The Rathbun Free Memorial Library (36 Main St, East Haddam). EHFPL is well known for its teen and family programs, while Rathbun Library is known for its adult and child programs. Both have special collections in addition to offering basic library fare
- Goodspeed Opera House – twice Tony award-winning theater, on Route 82 near the East Haddam Bridge.
- Music on the River - annual summer series of free concerts held on the Goodspeed Opera House green.
- Scherer Library of Musical Theatre - at the Goodspeed Opera House; the only library dedicated solely to American musical theatre in the world.
- Venture Smith Day – annual celebration at First Church Cemetery honoring Venture Smith, East Haddam resident and author of early slave narrative

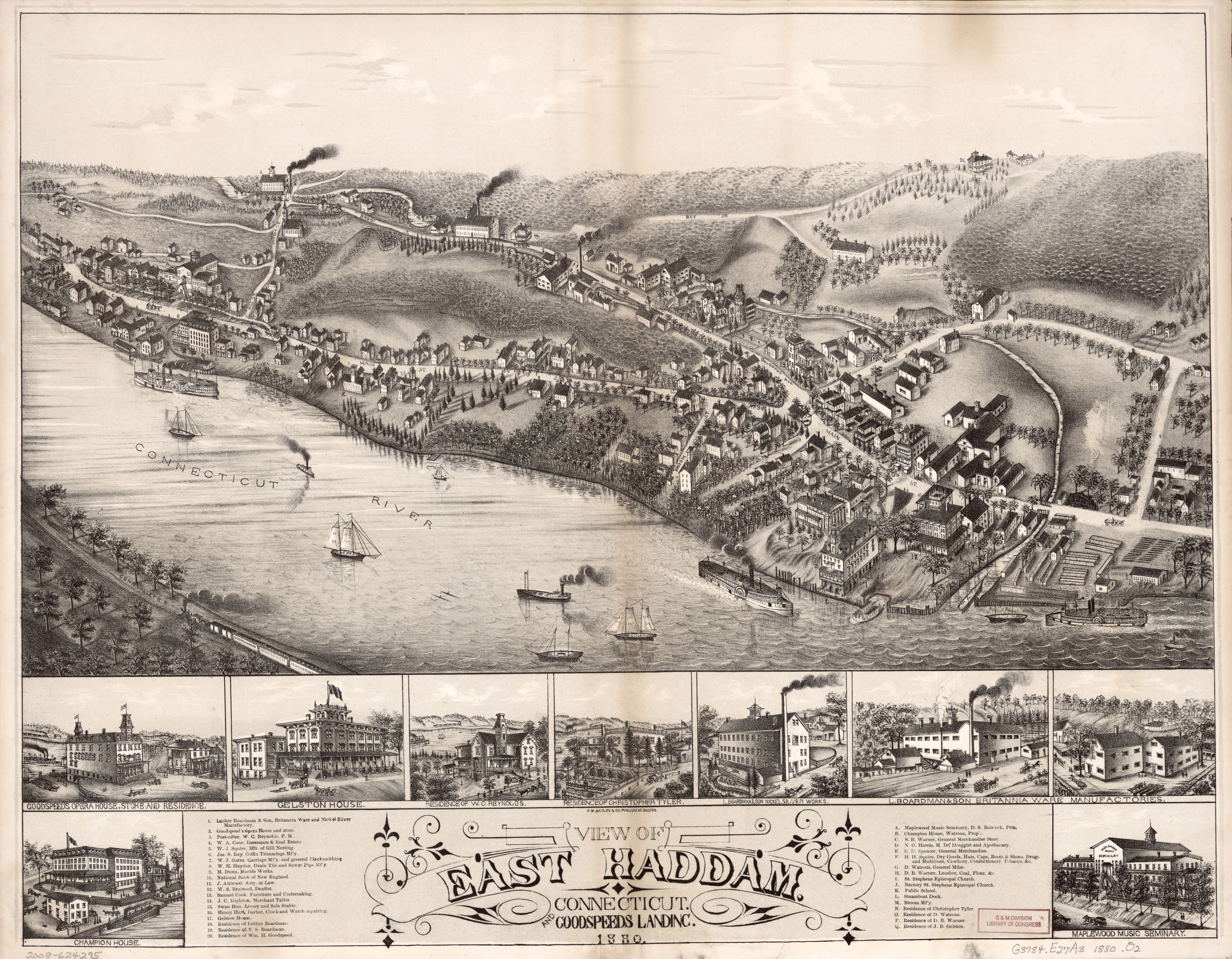
View of East Haddam and its sights from 1880

=== Historical ===
- Amasa Day House – historic museum, on Plains Road
- Allegra Farm - horsedrawn carriage and sleigh museum
- Champion House, a former hotel at Upper Oanding
- East Haddam Bridge – built in 1913, the 899-foot-long swing bridge is reputed to be the longest of its type in the world
- East Haddam Historical Society Museum – includes local history exhibits, including pictures of the construction of the East Haddam Swing Bridge.
- First Church of Christ – Congregational Church built in 1794, on Town Street.
- Gelston House – built in 1736, once a tavern and boarding house, now a restaurant and bar adjacent from the Goodspeed Opera House.
- Gideon Higgins house – site on the Underground Railroad, on Route 149.

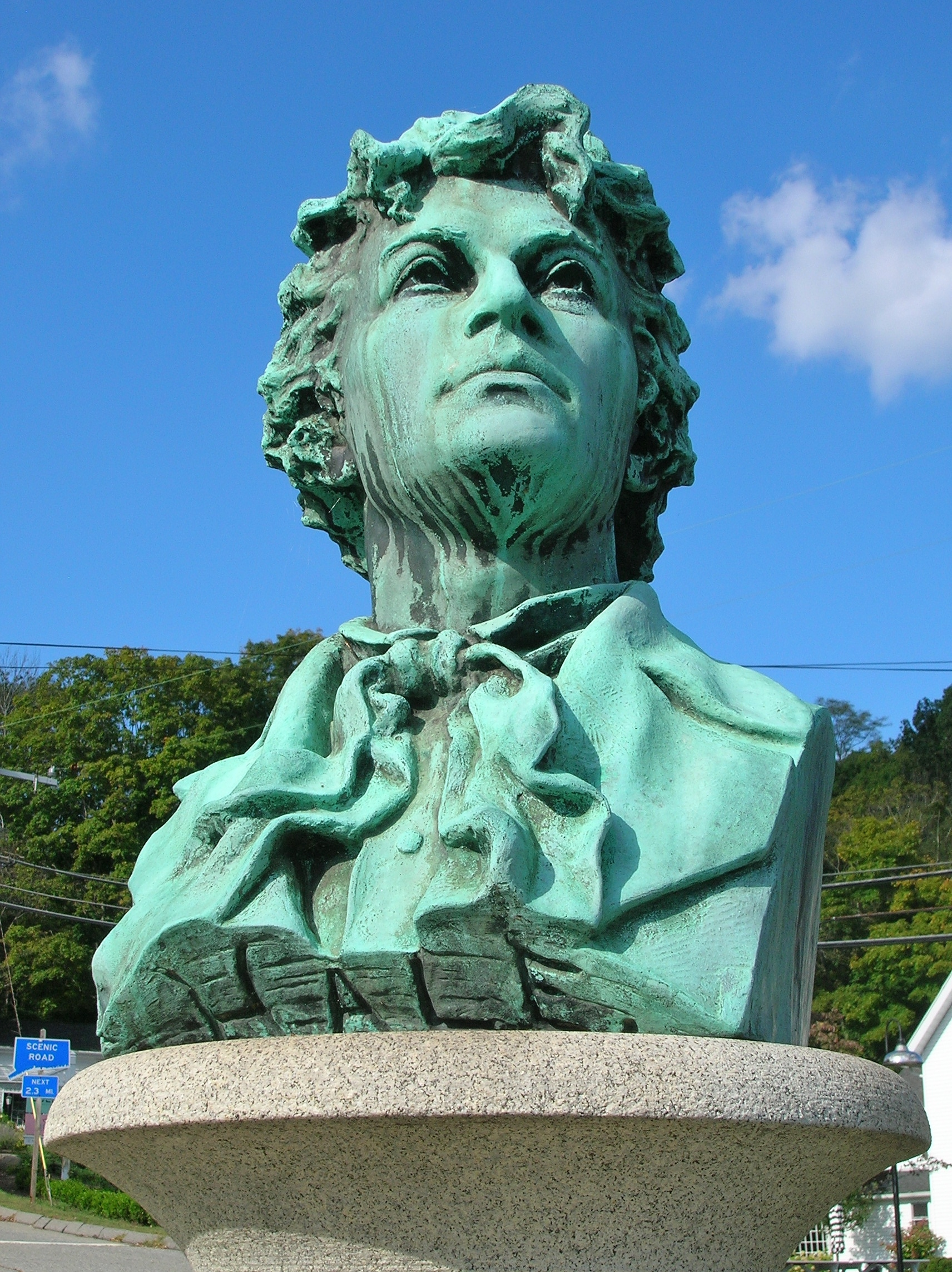
Bust of Nathan Hale located in the center of town.

- Johnsonville Village – once a thriving mill community, then a Victorian Era tourist attraction, then an abandoned ghost town, now owned by Iglesia ni Cristo.
- Nathan Hale School House – historic site, on Route 149, one of two Nathan Hale School Houses in Connecticut.
- St. Stephen's Bell – thought to be the oldest bell in the New World, it was cast in a Spanish monastery in 815 CE and brought to the US in 1834. It now hangs at St. Stephen's Episcopal Church on Route 149.
- Thunder in the Valley Ancient Drum & Fife Muster - annual parade of local corps.
- Venture Smith's Grave – a site on the Connecticut Freedom Trail.

=== Natural ===
- Devil's Hopyard State Park, natural area with hiking trails, picnic areas, campground, and Chapman's Falls.
- Eagle viewing sites:
  - Along the Connecticut River at the Town Office parking lot
  - Near Riverhouse, overlooking the north side of the East Haddam Bridge
- Gillette Castle State Park – historic former home of actor William Gillette and river outlook with hiking trails on Route 82.
- Lake Hayward, 1.5-mile (2.4 km) long, 0.5-mile (800 m) wide spring-fed lake in northern section of East Haddam. Originally called Long Pond.
- Machimoodus State Park
- Ray of Light - animal rescue and attraction

== Notable people ==
- Morgan Bulkeley (1837–1922), Baseball Hall of Fame inductee and first president of the National League
- George Comer (1858–1937), polar explorer and whaler; namesake of Gallinula comeri
- Christopher Dodd (b. 1944), United States senator for Connecticut from 1981 to 2011
- Nathanael Emmons (1745–1840), Congregational minister, theologian
- William Gillette (1853-1937), actor who portrayed Sherlock Holmes
- John Gardner Griffin (1815-1904), Wisconsin state assemblyman
- Bill Griffith (b. 1944), cartoonist
- Nathan Hale (1755-1776), school teacher, patriot, soldier, and spy
- Louis P. Harvey (1820–1862), seventh governor of Wisconsin
- Uriel Holmes (1764–1827), United States representative from Connecticut
- Elizabeth Louisa Foster Mather (1815–1882), writer
- George White Pratt (1840-1899), Wisconsin state senator
- Venture Smith (c.1725-1809), former slave and entrepreneur
- Joseph Spencer (1714-1789), lawyer, soldier, and statesman during the Revolutionary War
- Heinz Warneke (1895-1983), sculptor. The East Haddam Historical Society Museum has a wing dedicated to his works.
- Calvin Willey (1776-1858), United States senator and chair of the Senate Agriculture Committee

== Filming Location ==
- Christmas at Pemberley Manor (2018 Hallmark movie) - Staehly Farms
- Deep In Darkness (2014) - Moodus Village
- Gilmore Girls (2007) - Drive-by Gelston House in second episode
- Let's Scare Jessica To Death (1971) - Exterior of First Church of Christ, Petticoat Lane, various sciences on Town St.
- River of Dreams (1993 Billy Joel music video) - Johnsonville Village
- Sherlock Holmes Turns Engineer (1927) - Gillette's Castle
