= Eightmile River =

Coordinates: 41°25′52″N 72°20′15″W

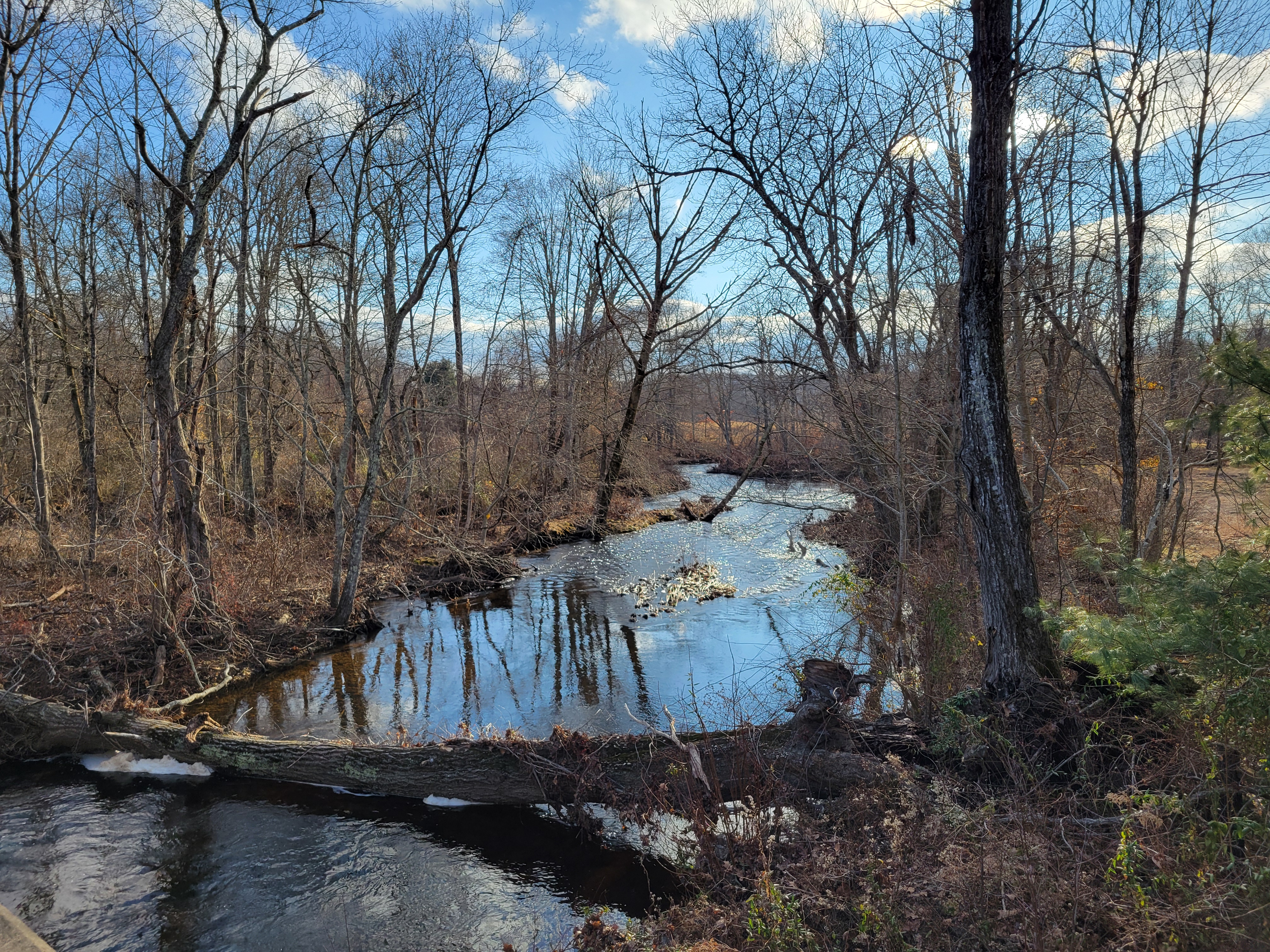
- Eightmile River at Route 156

National Wild and Scenic River
- Type: Scenic
- Designated: May 8, 2008

The source of the Eightmile River is a swampy, undeveloped region in the town of East Haddam, Connecticut, centered between Ackley Road, Hall Kilbourne Road, Usher Swamp Road, and Miles Standish Road. The Eightmile River runs for 13.4 miles (21.6 km) to Hamburg Cove in the town of Lyme, Connecticut.

The East Branch of the river begins 1/10 of a mile west of the junction of Route 85 and Witch Meadow Road, about 1 mile north of Salem, Connecticut. A popular paddling route begins about 3 miles southwest of Salem along Darling Road about a half mile southwest of the junction of White Birch Road. Most of the route is whitewater reaching Class III-IV at its most difficult with some flatwater and quickwater between the rapids. A take-out can be found at the Route 156 bridge just before the river's confluence with the main branch of the Eightmile River.

== Gallery ==
=== East Haddam ===
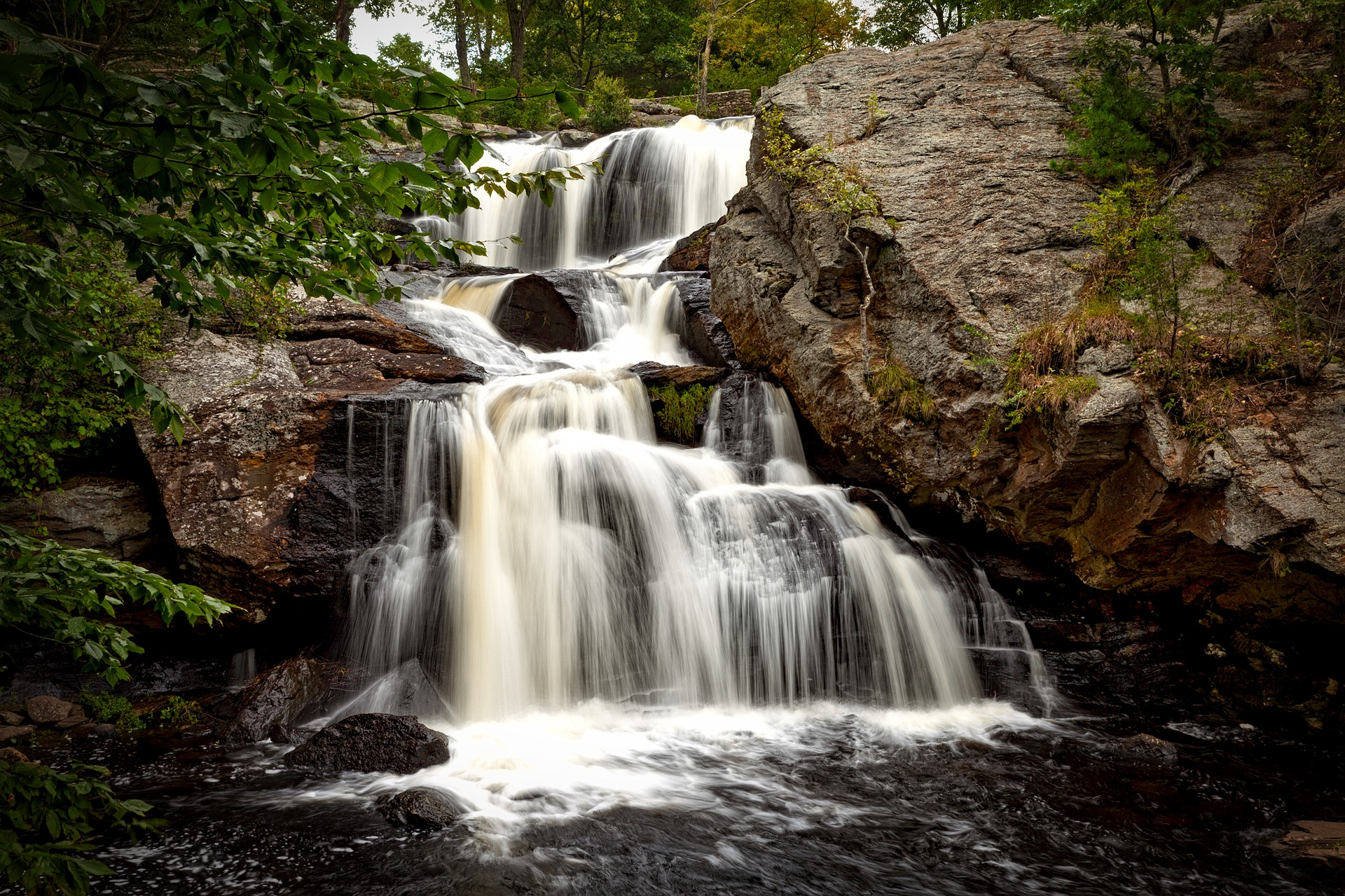
Chapman Falls in Devil's Hopyard State Park.

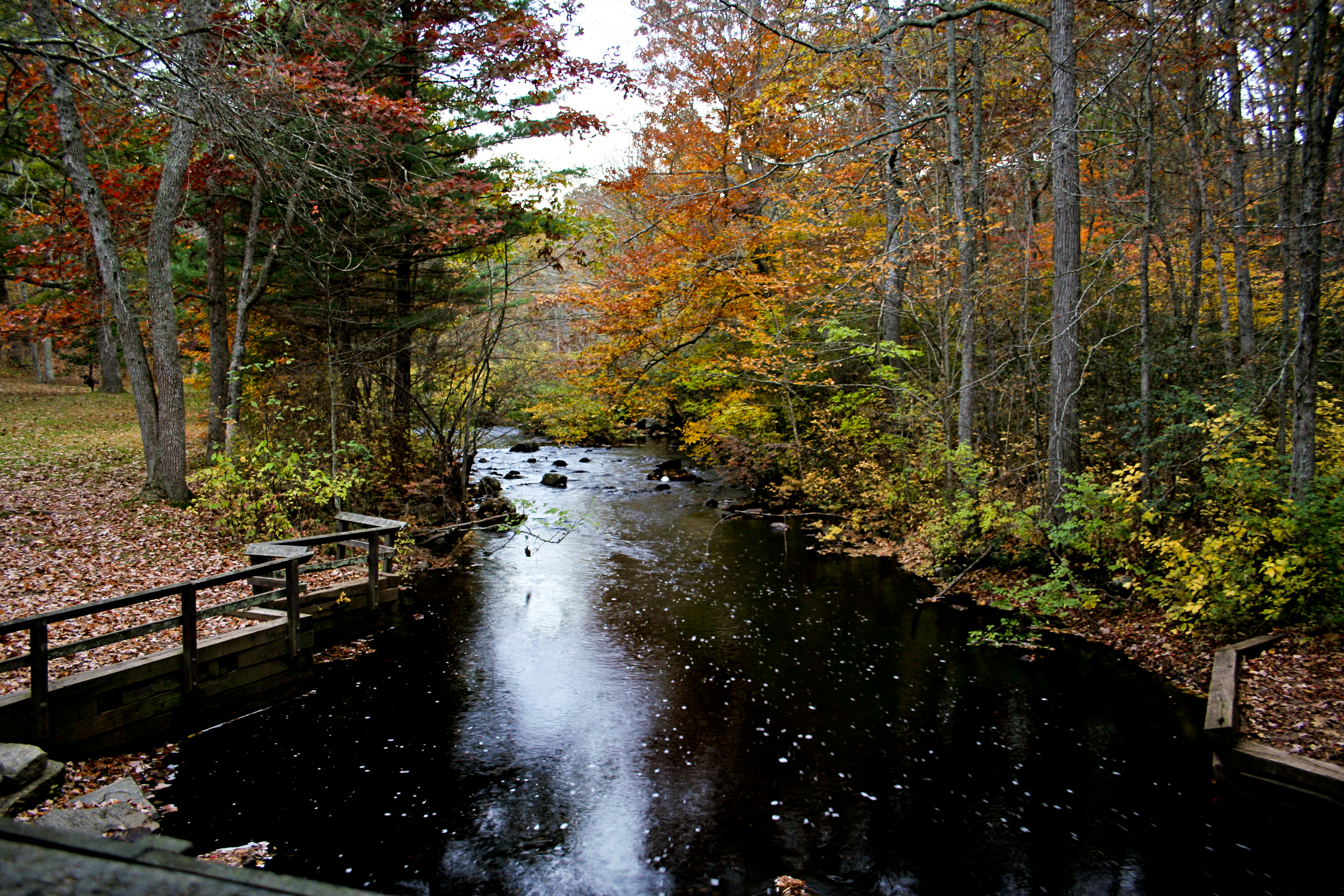
View from the covered bridge in Devil's Hopyard State Park.

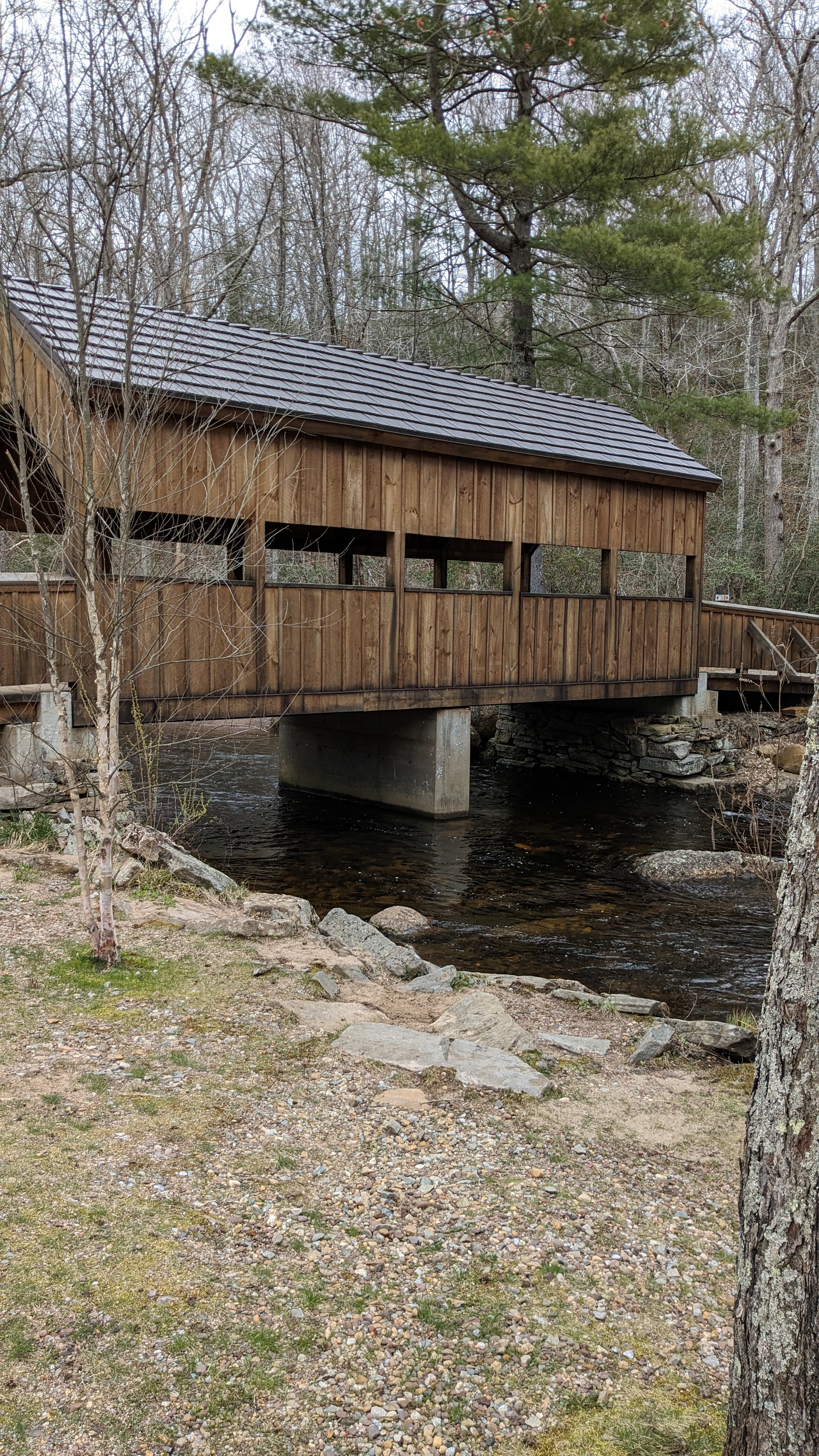
Covered bridge across the Eightmile River in Devil's Hopyard State Park`.

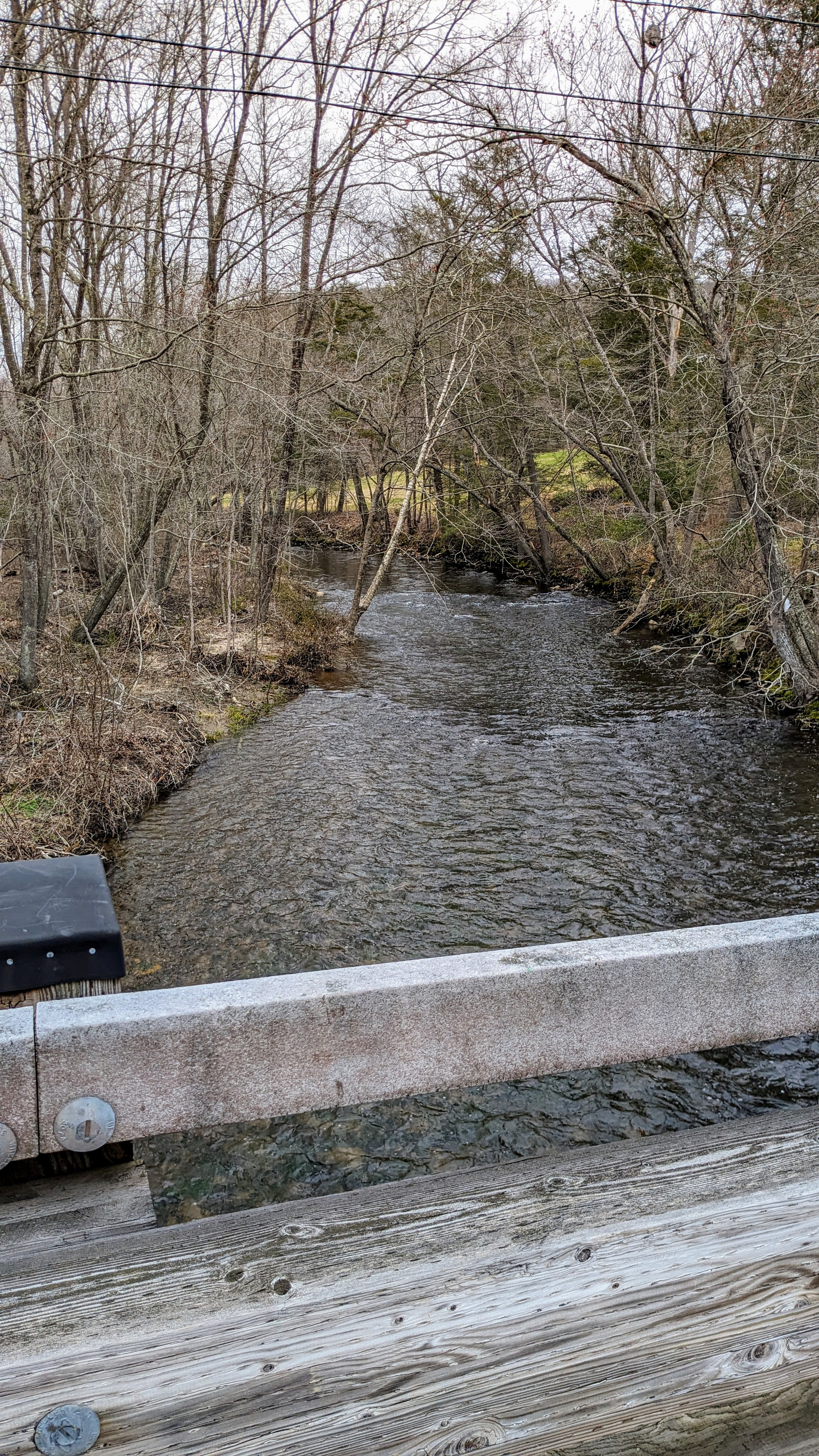
Eightmile River at Jones Hill Road bridge.

=== Lyme ===
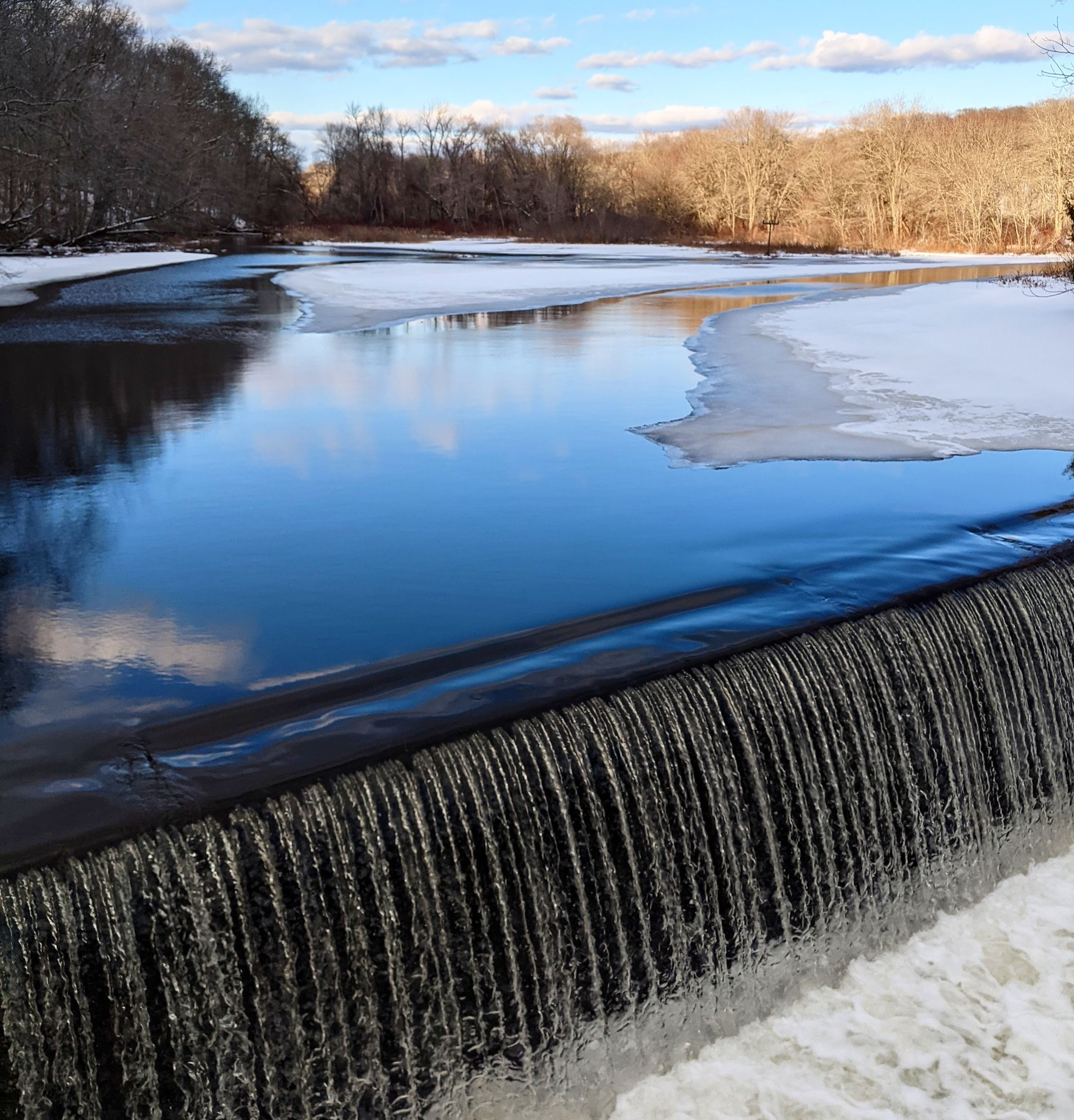
Moulson Pond and Rathbun Dam from Mount Archer Road.

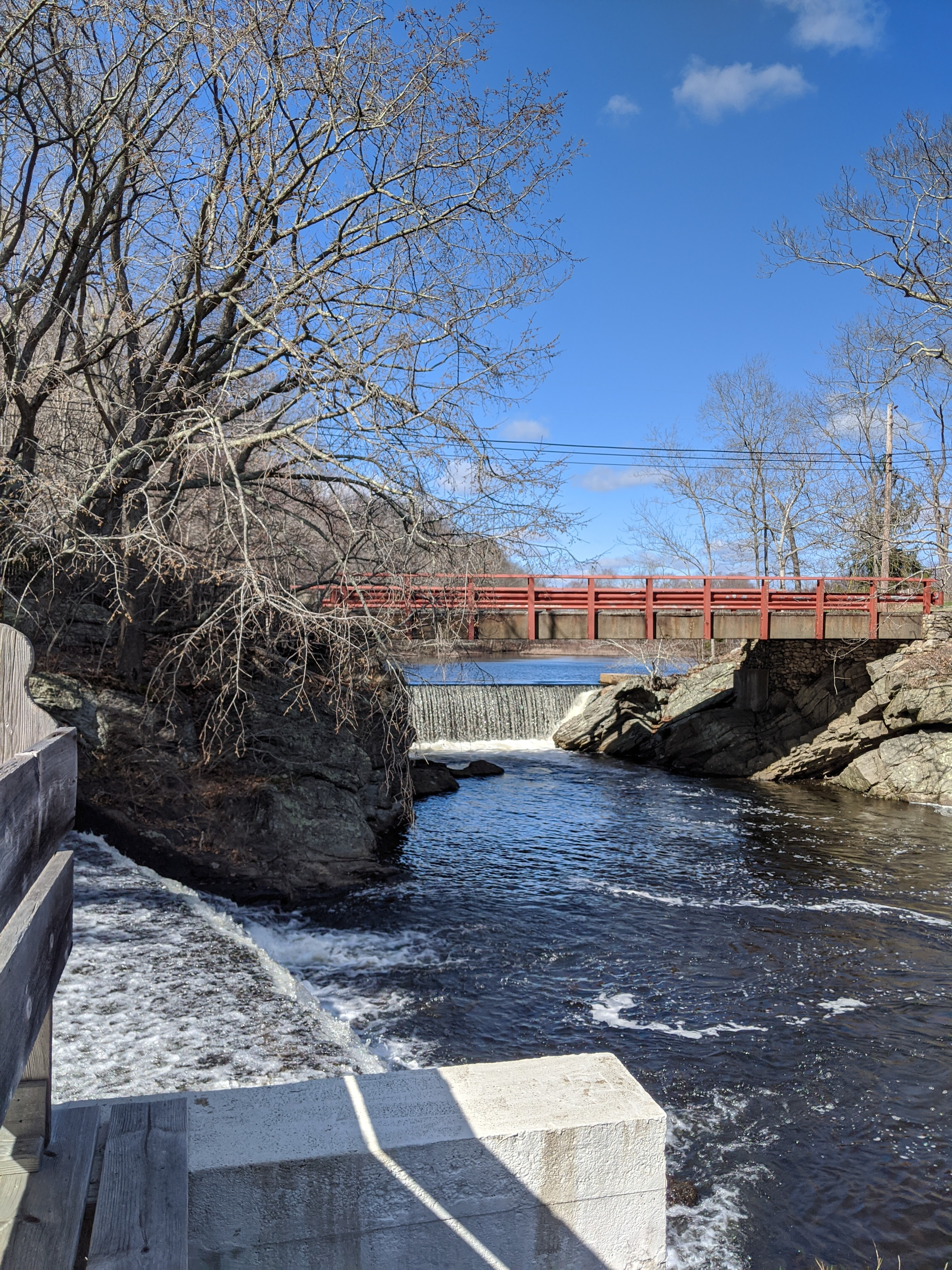
The bridge at Mount Archer Road.

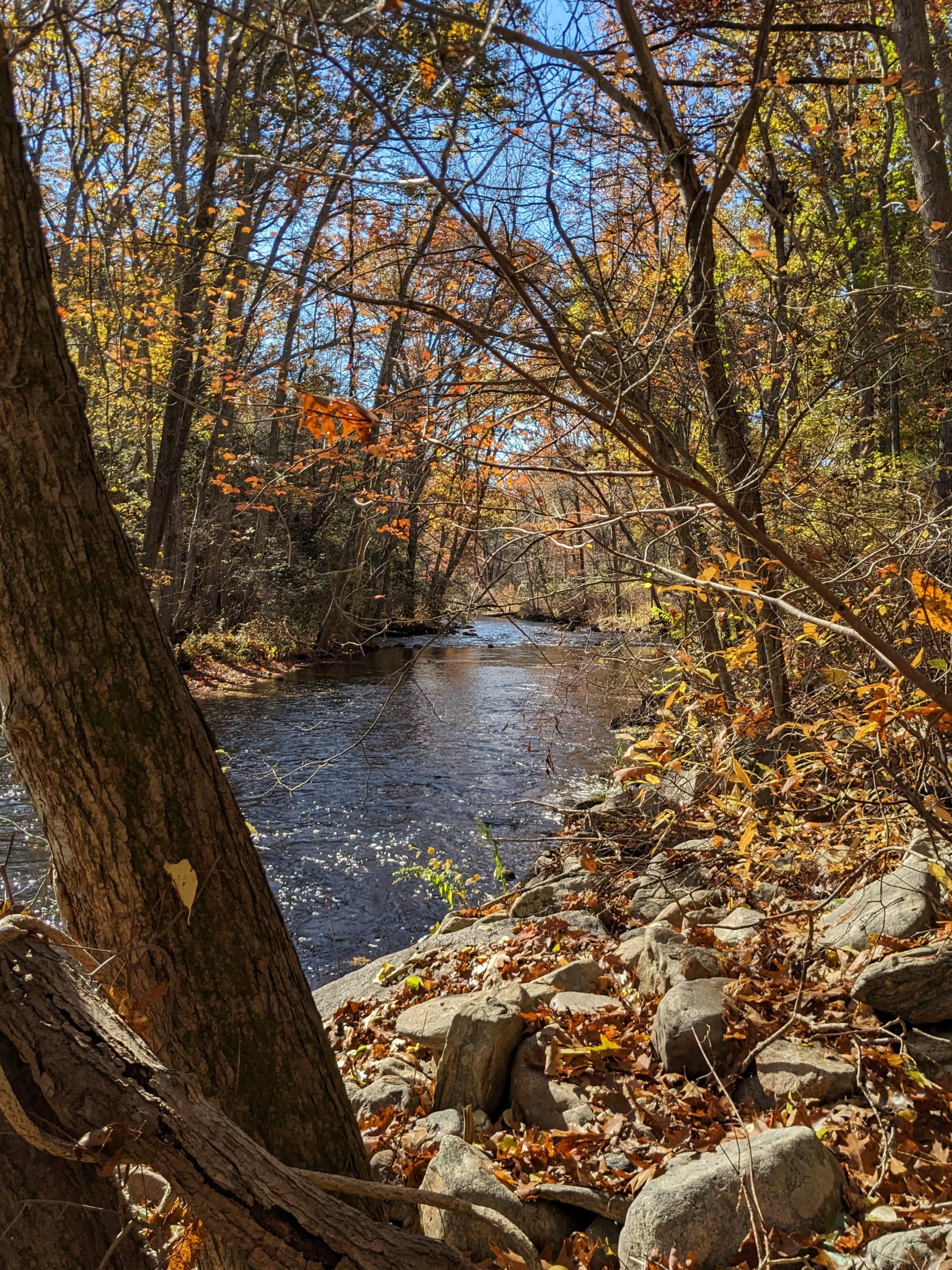
The Eightmile River above Joshuatown Road.

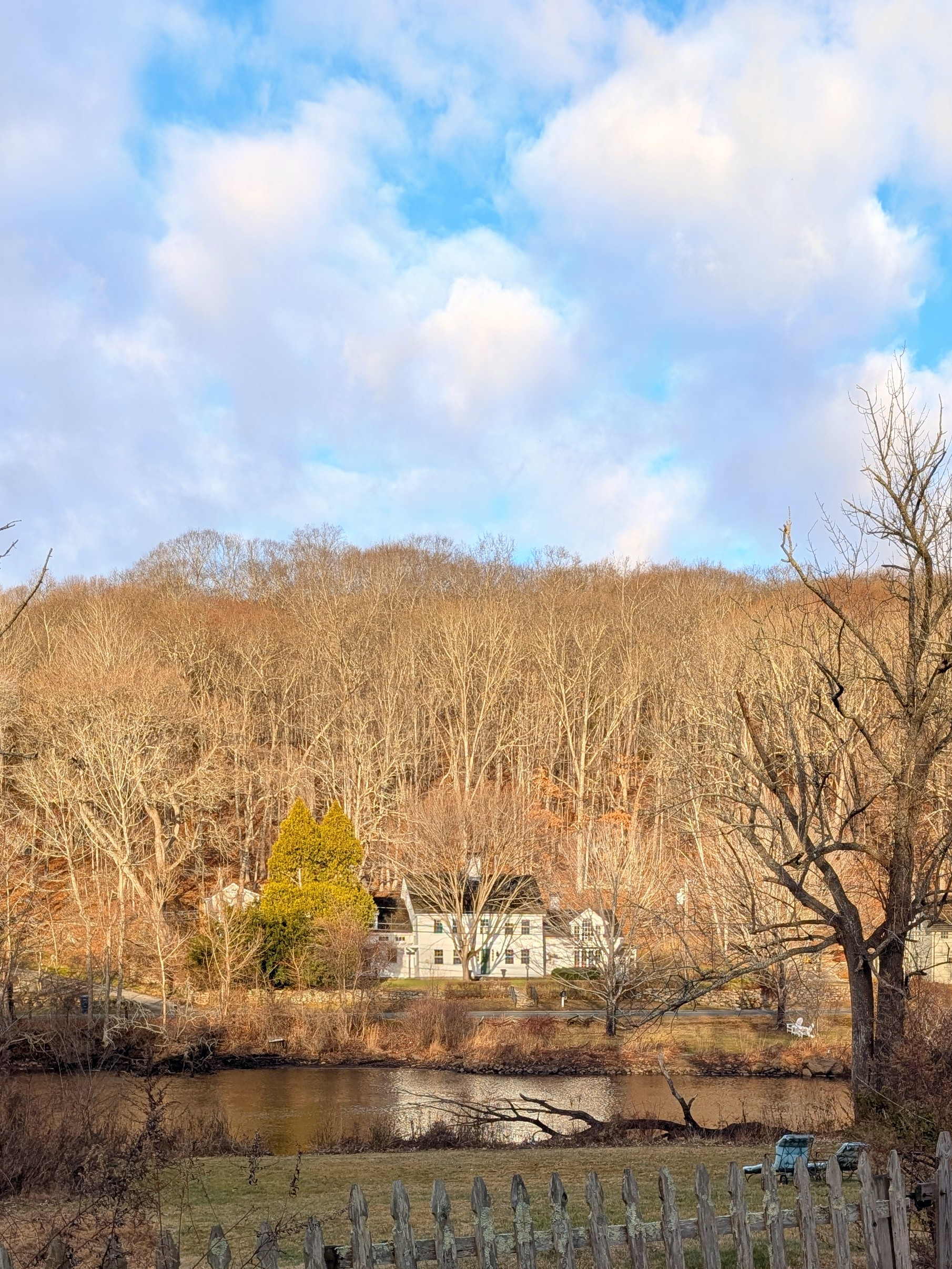
Eightmile River below Joshuatown Road bridge.

A view of Hamburg Cove from Cove Road.

== Tributaries of the Eightmile River (from source to mouth) ==
=== East Haddam tributaries ===
Begin at Pecks Meadow Pond outlet dam:

- An unnamed stream, joins the river from the north, southeast of Pecks Meadow Pond.
- An unnamed stream, joins the river from the south, east of Wickham Road.
- An unnamed stream, joins the river from the north, south of Geoffrey Road.
- An unnamed stream, joins the river from the north, west of Early Road.
- An unnamed stream, joins the river from the south, east of Hopyard Road.
- Early Brook, joins the river from the northeast, west of Salem Road.
- Lake Hayward Brook, joins Eightmile River from the east.
- Unnamed stream joins the river from the east, north of Foxtown Road.
- Unnamed stream joins the river from the east at Chapman Lake, south of Foxtown Road.
- Muddy Brook joins the Eightmile River from the west, east of Hopyard Road.
- Unnamed stream joins the river from the west, east of Hopyard Road near Mitchell Road.
- Burnhams Brook joins the Eightmile River from the east, just east of Hopyard Road.
- Hedge Brook joins the Eightmile River from the west, east of Hopyard Road.
- Strongs Brook joins the Eightmile River from the east at the river’s intersection with Route 82.
- Unnamed stream joins the Eightmile River from the west at the river’s intersection with Route 82.

=== Lyme tributaries ===
- Eightmile River East Branch joins Eightmile River from the east, south of the intersection of routes 156 and 82, Lyme, CT.
- Cranberry Meadow Brook enters Eightmile River from the west, south of the intersection of routes 156 and 82, Lyme, CT.
- An unnamed stream enters Eightmile River from the west, north of Macintosh Road, and opposite the town library.
- A small, unnamed stream enters Eightmile River from the northwest at Moulson Pond, after crossing Macintosh Road.
- Beaver Brook enters Eightmile River from the northeast at Moulson Pond, after crossing Route 156.
- Falls Brook enters Hamburg Cove from the east, at Cove Road.

== See also ==
- List of rivers of Connecticut
