= Claire (given name) =

- Pronunciation: /ˈklɛər/
- Gender: Unisex
- Language: English; French

Origin
- Origin: French
- Meaning: "clear", "bright"
- Region of origin: France

Other names
- Variant forms: Clair; Clare; Klare; Klaire; Clairy
- Related names: Clare, Clara, Clarissa, Clarisse, Clarice, Chiara, Ciara, Klare, Klara, Clarabelle,

Claire or Clair /ˈklɛər/ is a given name of French origin. The word means clear in French in its feminine form.

Its popularity in the United Kingdom peaked during the 1970s and 1980s; in 1974 it was the second most popular female first name and in 1984 was still sixth, but by 1997 it had fallen out of the top 100 after several years of sharply declining popularity.

'French form of Clarus (see Clara). As an English name it is unisex, sometimes being regarded as a variant of Claire, French form of Clara. This was a common name in France throughout the 20th century, though it has since been eclipsed there by Clara. It was also very popular in the United Kingdom, especially in the 1970s'.

In the early 20th century, it became more commonly used as a female name and is usually spelt Claire.

According to WolframAlpha, the name Claire is the 67th female name in the world.

== Women ==
=== Actresses ===
- Claire Adams (1898–1978), Canadian actress
- Claire Bloom (born 1931), English actress
- Claire Coffee (born 1980), American actress
- Claire Corlett (born 1999), Canadian actress
- Claire Cox (born 1975), British actress
- Claire Danes (born 1979), American actress
- Claire Dodd (1911–1973), American actress
- Claire Forlani (born 1972), English actress
- Claire Foy (born 1984), English actress
- Claire Holt (born 1988), Australian actress
- Claire Lacombe (1765–1826), French actress
- Claire Maurier (1929–2026), French actress
- Claire Nielson (1937–2026), Scottish actress
- Claire Schade (1893–1991), American vaudeville actress
- Claire Sweeney (born 1971), English actress, singer, and television personality
- Claire Trevor (1910–2000), American actress
- Claire Yiu (born 1978), Hong Kong actress

=== Politics ===
- Claire Baker (born 1971), British politician
- Claire Begg (died 2025), American politician
- Claire Bouchet (born 1954), French politician
- Claire Coutinho (born 1985), British politician
- Claire Clutterham, Australian politician
- Claire Fox (born 1960), British journalist, writer and politician
- Claire Guichard (born 1967), French politician
- Claire Guion-Firmin (born 1957), French politician
- Claire IsaBelle (born 1962), Canadian politician
- Claire Janowski, American retired politician from Connecticut
- Claire Johnson, Canadian politician
- Claire Kerrane (born 1992), Irish Sinn Féin politician
- Claire Martens (born 1987), Dutch politician
- Claire McCaskill (born 1953), American politician from Missouri
- Claire Perry O'Neill (born 1964), British businesswoman and former politician
- Claire O'Petit (born 1949), French politician
- Claire Pitollat (born 1979), French politician
- Claire Sugden (born 1986), British politician
- Claire Rattée, Canadian politician
- Claire Shulman (1926–2020), American politician
- Claire Valdez, American politician
- Claire Ward (born 1972), British politician

=== Royalty and aristocracy ===
- Princess Claire of Belgium (born 1974), British-Belgian land surveyor
- Princess Claire of Luxembourg (born 1985), a member of the grand ducal family of Luxembourg and bioethics researcher

=== Sports ===
- Claire Backhouse-Sharpe (born 1958), Canadian badminton player
- Claire Butorac (born 1999), American ice hockey player
- Claire Calvert (born 1988), English ballet dancer
- Claire Curzan (born 2004), American competitive swimmer and Olympian
- Clair DeGeorge (born 1999), American ice hockey player
- Claire Donahue (born 1989), American swimmer
- Claire Emslie (born 1994), Scottish footballer
- Claire Fahey (born 1991), British real tennis player
- Claire Febvay (born 1982), French diver
- Claire Izacard (born 1964), French diver
- Claire Johnstone (born 1982), Scottish football goalkeeper
- Claire Lecat (born 1965), French judoka
- Claire Lovett (1910–2005), Canadian badminton and tennis player
- Claire Martin (born 1998), French artistic gymnast
- Claire Morel (born 1984), French footballer
- Claire Pontlevoy (born 2003), French artistic gymnast
- Claire Vautrin (1917–1995), French sprint canoeist
- Claire Weinstein (born 2007), American Olympic medalist freestyle swimmer

=== Other ===
- Claire Adjiman, French academic
- Claire Armitstead, British journalist
- Claire Boucher (born 1988), Canadian musician better known by her stage name Grimes
- Claire Bouilhac (born 1970), French bande dessinée illustrator, scriptwriter, and colorist
- Claire Broadbridge (1937–2017), Trinidadian conservationist and museum curator
- Claire Buffie (born 1986), American photographer
- Claire Byrne (born 1975), Irish journalist and television presenter
- Claire Chazal (born 1956), French journalist
- Claire Clairmont (1798–1879), stepsister of Mary Shelley and mother of Allegra
- Claire Cottrill (born 1998), American musician known by her stage name Clairo
- Claire Cunningham (born 1977), Scottish choreographer
- Claire Cupples, Canadian microbiologist
- Claire Deeks, New Zealand anti-vaccine activist
- Claire dela Fuente (1958–2021), Filipino singer and businesswoman
- Claire Denis (born 1946), French film director and screenwriter
- Claire Etcherelli (1934–2023), French novelist
- Claire Évéquoz (2006-pres.), Swiss artist
- Claire Falkenstein (1908–1997), American artist
- Claire Finkelstein, American professor at the University of Pennsylvania Law School
- Claire Fontijn, musicologist
- Claire Hardaker (linguist) (born 1981), English forensic and corpus linguist
- Claire Hodgkins (1929–2011), American virtuoso violinist
- Claire Hooper (born 1976), Australian comedian
- Claire Ighodaro, British-born Nigerian chartered management accountant
- Claire Keegan (born 1968), Irish writer
- Claire Lomas (born 1980), British campaigner, fundraiser and former event rider
- Claire Martin, people of the same name:
  - Claire Martin (1914–2014), pseudonym of Canadian author Claire Montreuil
  - Claire Martin, British-born television weather presenter, now living in Canada
  - Claire Martin (born 1967), British jazz singer
- Claire McCardell (1905–1958), American fashion designer
- Claire Moore, people of the same name:
  - Claire Moore (born 1960), British singer and actress
  - Claire Moore (born 1956), Australian politician
- Claire Julie de Nanteuil (1834–1897), French writer
- Claire Newell, Canadian travel expert and business woman
- Claire Rafferty (footballer) (born 1989), English pundit and professional footballer
- Claire Rayner (1931–2010), English journalist and agony aunt
- Claire Richards (born 1977), English singer
- Claire Rutter (born 1976), English soprano
- Claire Saffitz (born 1986), pastry chef, Youtube personality, contributing editor to Bon Appétit
- Claire Seymour (1970–2024), English educator, violinist and music reviewer
- Claire Skinner (born 1964), British actress
- Claire Smith, people of the same name:
  - Claire Smith (archaeologist) (born 1957), Australian archaeologist
  - Claire Smith (journalist) (born 1954), American sportswriter
  - Claire Smith (equestrian) (born 1963), Canadian equestrian
  - Claire Bidwell Smith (born 1978), American therapist and author
  - Claire Elizabeth Smith (born 1970), British TV host, model and beauty pageant titleholder
- Claire E. Sterk (born 1957), Dutch scientist
- Claire Sterling (1919–1995), American author and journalist
- Claire Summers, Welsh news presenter
- Claire Tiltman (1977–1993), English murder victim
- Claire Vallée (born 1980), French chef
- Claire Waldoff (1884–1957), German singer
- Claire Wallace (1900/1906–1968), Canadian journalist and broadcaster
- Claire Williams, people of the same name:
  - Claire Williams (born 1976), British motorsport executive and former deputy team principal of Williams Racing
  - Claire Williams (born 1987), Welsh paralympian athlete
- Claire Woolterton (died 1981), American murder victim

=== Fictional characters ===
- Claire Bennet, in the television series Heroes
- Claire Conway, in the television series The Morning Show
- Claire Dearing, protagonist in the movie Jurassic World
- Claire Dunphy in the television series Modern Family
- Claire Farron, aka Lightning, protagonist in the video game Final Fantasy XIII and its second sequel Lightning Returns: Final Fantasy XIII
- Claire Fisher, in the television series Six Feet Under
- Claire Fraser, the heroine of the Outlander novel series and television series
- Clair Huxtable, in the television series The Cosby Show
- Claire Kincaid, in the television series Law & Order
- Claire Kyle, in the television series My Wife & Kids
- Claire Littleton, in the television series Lost
- Claire Novak, in the television series Supernatural
- Claire Parker, in the comic book series Spider-Man: Life Story
- Claire Peacock, in the television series Coronation Street
- Claire Redfield, in the video game series Resident Evil
- Claire Riesen, in the television series Dominion
- Claire Temple, in the television series Daredevil
- Claire Underwood, in the television series House of Cards

== Men ==
- Clair du Dauphiné (c. 590–660), French Catholic abbot
- Clair of Nantes, first bishop of Nantes, France in the late 3rd century
- Claire Alexander (born 1945), Canadian ice hockey player
- Claire Allen (1853–1942), American architect
- Claire Ball (1941–2019), American attorney and politician
- Clair Bee (1896–1983), American basketball coach and sports novelist
- Claire B. Bird (1868–1954), American lawyer
- Clair Branch (1937–2022), American football player
- Claire Brésolles (1929–2018), French runner
- Clair Alan Brown (1903–1982), American botanist
- Clair Burgener (1921–2006), American politician
- Clair A. Callan (1920–2005), American politician
- Lt. Gen. Claire Lee Chennault (1893–1958), American aviator, commander of the Flying Tigers
- Clair Cline (1917–2010), American carpenter and cabinetmaker, World War II veteran
- Claire Cribbs (1912–1985), American basketball player and high school coach
- Clair Carlton Criss (1879–1952), American businessman
- Clair W. Ditchy (1891–1967), American architect
- Claire Dunn (1915–1996), American football coach
- Claire Egtvedt (1892–1975), American airplane designer
- Clair Engle (1911–1964), American politician and senator
- Clair Finch (1911–1976), American lawyer and politician
- Claire Frye (1899–1971), American college football player
- Clair George (1930–2011), veteran officer of the Central Intelligence Agency
- Clair F. Gill (born 1943), United States Army general
- Clair L. Gleason (1923–1986), American sports coach and college athletics administrator
- Clair Goodblood (1929–1951), US Army soldier
- Claire Goodwin (1891–1972), American baseball player
- Clair Huffaker (1926–1990), American author
- Claire E. Hutchin Jr. (1916–1980), United States Army lieutenant general
- Clair Aubrey Huston, American postage stamp designer
- Clair Kenamore (1875–1935), American journalist
- Claire Konold (1938–2024), American politician
- Claire Lawrence (born 1939), Canadian musician with the band Chilliwack and music producer
- Clair Maxwell (1890–1957), American journalist
- Clair McCollough (1904–1995), American broadcasting executive
- Clair Omar Musser (1901–1998), American marimba player
- Clair Nelson (1940–2019), American politician, farmer, and businessman
- Clair Patterson (1922–1995), American geochemist
- Clair E. Robb (1905–1965), American judge
- Clair Roddewig (1903–1975), American attorney
- Claire L. Straith (1891–1958), American plastic surgeon
- Clair S. Tappaan (1878–1932), American lawyer, professor, and jurist
- Clair Tisseur (1827–1896), French architect
- Clair H. Voss (1920–1999), American lawyer and judge
- Clair Warner (1903–1970), American-born Canadian football player and executive
- Clair Wilcox (1898–1970), American economist
- Clair Ysebaert (born 1950), Belgian politician
- Clair Zimmerman (born 1956), American professional stock car racing driver

=== Fictional character ===
- Claire Stanfield, in the light novel series Baccano!
- Clair Deforest, in the film The Last Broadcast

== See also ==
- Claire (disambiguation)
