= Clare (surname) =

Clare is a surname of English or Irish origin. Notable people with the surname include:

== Clare ==
- Ada Clare (1834–1874), American actress, writer, and feminist
- Alan Clare (1921–1993), British jazz pianist
- Alex Clare (born 1985), English singer-songwriter
- Alfred Clare (1851–1912), British solicitor
- Alys Clare (real name Elizabeth Harris, born 1944), English author
- Anthony Clare (1942–2007), Irish psychiatrist
- Baldwin of Clare (fl. 1141), French noble
- Camille A. Clare, American obstetrician and gynecologist
- Cassandra Clare (born 1973), American author
- Chapman James Clare (1853–1940), British-Australian sailor
- Charlie Clare (born 1991), English rugby union player
- Clarette Clare, American silent film actress
- Claudia Clare, British ceramicist and writer
- Craig Clare (born 1984), New Zealand rugby union player
- Daryl Clare (born 1978), Irish professional footballer and coach
- Denny Clare (1853–1928), American baseball player
- Diane Clare (1938–2013), British actress
- Dustin Clare (born 1982), Australian actor
- Edwin Clare (1883–1944), English footballer
- Eli Clare (born 1963), American activist and writer
- Eva Clare (1884–1961), Canadian musician and educator
- George Clare (writer) (1920–2009), UK-Austrian journalist
- George Adam Clare (1854–1915), Canadian politician
- George William Burdett Clare (1889–1917), English recipient of the Victoria Cross
- Gilbert Holles, 3rd Earl of Clare (1633–1689), English politician
- Gwen C. Clare (born 1945), American diplomat
- Harcourt Clare (1854–1922), English county council clerk
- Helen Clare (1916–2018), English singer
- Horatio Clare, Welsh author
- Ina Clare (1932–2010), British actress
- Jack Clare, Australian rugby league player
- James Clare (rugby league) (born 1991), English rugby league footballer
- James Clare (rugby union) (1857–1930), Wales international rugby union player
- Jason Clare (born 1972), Australian politician
- Jillian Clare (born 1992), American actress and singer
- Jimmy Clare (born 1959), English footballer
- Joe Clare (1910–1987), English footballer
- John Clare (1793–1864), English poet
- John Clare (journalist) (born 1955), English author and journalist
- John Clare (soccer), American soccer coach
- Jonathan Clare (born 1986), English cricketer
- Joseph Clare (1846–1917), English scenic designer and painter
- Kenny Clare (1929–1984), British jazz drummer
- Kerry and Lindsay Clare, Australian wife and husband architects
- Leanne Clare (born 1962), Australian judge
- Lou Clare (1950–2017), Canadian gridiron football player
- Madelyn Clare (1894–1975), American actress
- Mary Clare (1892–1970), British actress
- Matt Clare (born 1988), American soccer player
- Monica Clare (1924–1973), Aboriginal political activist and author
- Natalia Clare (1919–2007), American ballet dancer and instructor
- Octavius Leigh-Clare (1841–1912), English barrister and politician
- Osbert of Clare, 12th-century monk
- Patti Clare (born 1976), English actress
- Pauline Clare (born 1947), British police officer
- Peter Clare (1738–1786), British surgeon
- Phyllis Clare (1905–1947), British actress
- Ralph Clare (1589–1670), English courtier and politician
- Robert Clare (born 1983), English footballer
- Roy Clare (born 1950), British Royal Navy Rear Admiral
- Sean Clare (born 1996), English footballer
- Sheldon Clare, Canadian politician
- Sidney Clare (1892–1972), American comedian, dancer and composer
- Thomas Clare (monk), English Benedictine monk and university Chancellor
- Thomas Clare (cricketer) (1883–1940), English cricketer
- Tom Clare (singer) (1876–1946), British music hall singer
- Tom Clare (lawyer), American lawyer
- Tom Clare (footballer) (born 1999), English footballer
- Tommy Clare (1865–1929), English footballer and manager
- Vernon Lawrence Clare (1925–1998), New Zealand musician and cabaret owner
- William Harvey Clare (1874–1956), Canadian politician

== de Clare ==
- de Clare, Anglo-Norman noble family
- Amice de Clare (1220–1284), English noblewoman
- Basilia de Clare (fl. 1173–1201), Anglo-Norman noblewoman
- Bogo de Clare (1248–1294), English ecclesiastic
- Eleanor de Clare (1292–1337), Anglo-Welsh noblewoman
- Elizabeth de Clare (1295–1360), English heiress
- Gilbert Fitz Richard known also as Gilbert de Clare (died 1117), lord of Clare, Tonbridge and Ceredigion
- Gilbert de Clare, 1st Earl of Pembroke (1100–1148)
- Gilbert de Clare, 1st Earl of Hertford (1115–1153)
- Gilbert de Clare, 4th Earl of Hertford and 5th Earl of Gloucester (1180–1230)
- Gilbert de Clare, 6th Earl of Hertford and 7th Earl of Gloucester (1243–1295)
- Gilbert de Clare, 7th Earl of Hertford and 8th Earl of Gloucester (1291–1314)
- Isabel de Clare, 4th Countess of Pembroke (1172–1220)
- Isabella of Gloucester and Hertford (1226-1264)
- Margaret de Clare (1293–1342), English noblewoman
- Maud de Clare (1276–1327), English noblewoman
- Richard de Clare, 2nd Earl of Pembroke (1130–1176)
- Richard de Clare, 3rd Earl of Hertford (1153–1217)
- Richard fitz Gilbert (1035–1090), 1st Lord of Clare, known as "Robert de Clare"
- Richard Fitz Gilbert de Clare (died 1136), Norman nobleman
- Rohese de Clare (died before 1166), Anglo-Norman noblewoman
- Walter de Clare, 12th-century Anglo-Norman baron in England

== See also ==
- Clare (disambiguation)
- Clare (given name)
