= Clare (given name) =

- Pronunciation: /ˈklɛər/
- Gender: Unisex
- Language: English
- Name day: August 11

Origin
- Origin: French/Irish/Latin
- Meaning: "bright", "clear"
- Region of origin: England

Other names
- Variant forms: Claire; Clair
- Related names: Clara, Clair/Claire, Clarissa, Clarisse, Clarice, Clarence, Clar

Clare /ˈklɛər/ is a given name, the medieval English form of Clara. 'French form of Clarus (see Clara). As an English name it is unisex, sometimes being regarded as a variant of Claire, French form of Clara. This was a common name in France throughout the 20th century, though it has since been eclipsed there by Clara. It was also very popular in the United Kingdom, especially in the 1970s'.

Clare and Claire are usually female in the UK but Clare is a common male name in the US (see list of names below).

It is very often associated with the Irish County Clare. That name was derived from the Irish word ('Clár') given to a small bridge that crossed the River Fergus near the town of Ennis in what is now County Clare.

== Women ==
- Clare of Assisi (1194–1253), saint, foundress of the Order of Poor Ladies (Poor Clares) and companion of Saint Francis
- Clare of Montefalco (c. 1268–1308), Augustinian Catholic saint, nun and abbess
- Clare of Rimini (c. 1260–c. 1326), beatified Poor Clare nun
- Clare Abbott (artist) (1921–2008), South African artist
- Clare Abbott (equestrian) (born 1986), Irish eventing rider
- Clare Adamson (born 1967), British politician
- Clare Akamanzi (born 1979), Rwandan politician
- Clare Asquith (born 1951), British scholar
- Clare Athfield, New Zealand interior designer
- Clare Atwood (1866–1962), British painter
- Clare Azzopardi (born 1977), Maltese writer
- Clare Bailey (born 1970), British politician
- Clare Balding (born 1971), British sports presenter
- Clare Baldwin, American journalist
- Clare Buckfield (born 1976), English actress
- Clare Colvin, British writer
- Clare Eichner (born 1969), American distance runner
- Clare Gass (1887–1968), Canadian military nurse and social worker
- Clare Grey (born 1965), British chemist
- Clare Grogan (born 1962), British musician
- Clare Hastings, British author, fashion journalist, stylist and costume designer
- Clare Hocking, New Zealand's first occupation therapy professor
- Clare Hunt (born 1999), Australian footballer
- Clare Kummer (1873–1958), American composer, lyricist and playwright
- Clare Lombardelli, British economist
- Clare Boothe Luce (1903–1987), American writer, politician and ambassador
- Clare Maguire (born 1987), British singer-songwriter
- Clare Martin (born 1952), Australian politician
- Cläre Mjøen (1874–1963), German-Norwegian translator and women's rights activist
- Clare Moody (born 1965), British politician
- Clare Mulley (born 1969), British author and historian
- Clare Nasir (born 1970), British meteorologist
- Clare Nott (born 1986), Australian wheelchair basketball player
- Clare Nowland (1928–2023), Australian nonagenarian who died after being tasered by police
- Clare Parnell (born 1970), British astrophysicist and applied mathematician
- Clare Polkinghorne (born 1989), Australian footballer
- Clare Potter (1903–1999), American fashion designer
- Clare Short (born 1948), British politician
- Clare Torry (born 1947), British singer-songwriter
- Clare Twomey (born 1968), British artist
- Clare Venema, Australian model
- Clare Wheatley (born 1971), British football player and administrator
- Clare Wheeler (born 1998), Australian footballer
- Clare Whitfield (born 1978), English writer

== Men ==
- Clare Hibbs Armstrong (1894–1969), United States Army general
- Clare Berryhill (1925–1996), American politician
- Clare Briggs (1875–1930), American comic strip artist
- Clare Bice (1909–1976), Canadian artist
- Clare Barnes Jr. (1907–1992), American author and art director
- Clare Baker (1885–1947), English cricketer
- Clare Carlson, American politician
- Clare Drake (1928–2018), Canadian retired ice hockey head coach
- Clare Victor Dwiggins (1874–1958), American cartoonist and illustrator
- Clare Exelby (born 1938), Canadian football player
- Clare Fischer (1928–2012), American musician
- Clare Ford (1828–1899), English diplomat
- Clare G. Fenerty (1895–1952), American politician
- Clare Grundman (1913–1996), American composer and arranger
- Clare W. Graves (1914–1986), American professor of psychology
- Clare Hunter (1886–1940), American football and basketball coach
- Clare Hoffman (1875–1967), United States Representative from Michigan's 4th congressional district
- Clare Jacobs (1886–1971), American pole vaulter
- Clare Laking (1899–2005), Canadian veteran of the First World War
- Clare Mapledoram (1903–1983), Canadian politician
- George "Clare" Martin (1922–1980), Canadian ice hockey player
- Clare Magee (1899–1969), American lawyer and politician
- Clare MacKichan (1918–1996), American engineer and automobile designer
- Clare Patterson (1887–1913), American outfielder and baseball
- Clare Purcell (1884–1964), American bishop
- Clare Randolph (1907–1972), American football player
- Clare Raglan (1927–2002), Canadian ice hockey player
- Clare Sewell Read (1826–1905), British agriculturist and politician
- Clare Retan (1888–1931), American lawyer and politician
- Clare Smith (born 1933), Canadian ice hockey player
- Clare H. Timberlake (1907–1982), American diplomat
- Clare Wakshinski (born 1936), Canadian professional hockey player
- Clare Woolwine (1888–1939), American politician
- Clare Westcott (1924–2025), Canadian politician
- Clare Jack Wheeler (1908–1990), American football player
- Clare Wilson (1886–1917), English professional footballer

== Fictional characters ==
- Clare, the main character from the manga and anime Claymore
- Clare (Power Rangers), in the series Power Rangers: Mystic Force
- Clare, in the British comic strip Clare in the Community
- Clare Abshire in the novel The Time Traveler's Wife by Audrey Niffenegger
- Clare Arnold in the 1990s television drama Beverly Hills, 90210
- Clare Bleecker in Don Roff's novel Clare at Sixteen, its sequels and a movie adaptation
- Clare Devine in the British soap opera Hollyoaks
- Clare Devlin in Derry Girls
- Clare Edwards in the Canadian television drama Degrassi: The Next Generation
- Clare Fishburn in Annie Dillard's novel The Living
- Clare Kendry in Nella Larsen's novel Passing
- Clare Quilty, a male character in Lolita

== See also ==
- Clare (surname)
- Clare (disambiguation)
- Clara (given name)
- Claire (given name)
- Sinclair (surname)
