= Clare =

Clare may refer to:

== Places ==
=== Antarctica ===
- Clare Range, a mountain range in Victoria Land

=== Australia ===
- Clare, South Australia, a town in the Clare Valley
- Clare Valley, South Australia

=== Canada ===
- Clare (electoral district), an electoral district
- Clare, Nova Scotia, a municipal district

=== Republic of Ireland ===
- County Clare, one of the 32 counties of Ireland
  - Clare (Dáil constituency) (since 1921)
  - County Clare (UK Parliament constituency) (1801–1885)
  - County Clare (Parliament of Ireland constituency) (until 1800)
- Clarecastle, a village in County Clare
- Clare, County Westmeath, a townland in Killare civil parish, barony of Rathconrath
- Clare Island, County Mayo
- River Clare, counties Galway and Mayo
- Clare (barony), in County Galway

=== South Africa ===
- Clare, Mpumalanga, a town in Mpumalanga province

=== United Kingdom ===
- Clare, County Antrim, a townland in County Antrim, Northern Ireland
- Clare, County Armagh, a village in County Armagh, Northern Ireland
- Clare, County Down, a townland in County Down, Northern Ireland
- Clare, County Tyrone, a townland in County Tyrone, Northern Ireland
- Clare, Oxfordshire, a location in England
- Clare, Suffolk, a town
  - Clare railway station, a closed station
  - Clare Rural District, a former district of West Suffolk

=== United States ===
- Clare, Illinois, an unincorporated community
- Clare, Indiana, an unincorporated community
- Clare, Iowa, a city
- Clare, Kansas, an unincorporated community
- Clare, Michigan, a city
- Clare, New York, a town
- Clare County, Michigan

== People and fictional characters ==
- Clare (given name), includes a list of people and fictional characters
- Clare (surname), includes a list of people and fictional characters with the surname Clare or de Clare
- de Clare, a noble family in medieval England

== Other uses ==
- Clare Street (disambiguation), streets of this name
- Clare GAA, responsible for Gaelic games in County Clare
- Earl of Clare, an extinct title created three times, once each in the peerages of England, Great Britain, and Ireland
- Viscount Clare, an extinct title in the Peerage of Ireland, created twice
- Cyclone Clare, which struck Western Australia in 2006
- USS Abel P. Upshur (DD-193), a destroyer traded to the Royal Navy and renamed HMS Clare at the beginning of the Second World War
- Clare College, Cambridge, a constituent college of the University of Cambridge
- The Clare, a residential skyscraper in Chicago, Illinois, United States
- Contact lens acute red eye, an inflammatory condition of the cornea due to overwearing of contact lenses
- "Clare", a song by Fairground Attraction

== See also ==
- Saint Clare (disambiguation)
- Clare Hall (disambiguation)
- Clare Valley (disambiguation)
- Clair (disambiguation)
- Clara (disambiguation)
