= Thomas Clare =

Thomas Clare may refer to:

- Thomas Clare (cricketer) (1883–1940), English cricketer
- Thomas Clare (monk), medieval English Benedictine monk and university chancellor
- Tommy Clare (1865–1929), English international footballer
- Tom Clare (singer) (1876–1946), British music hall singer
- Tom Clare (footballer) (born 1999), English footballer
- Tom Clare (lawyer), American lawyer

== See also ==
- Clare (surname)
- Thomas de Clare, Lord of Thomond (c. 1245–1287), Anglo-Norman peer and soldier
