= Clarisse (given name) =

Clarissa
- Gender: Female

Origin
- Origin: Latin, Italian, Portuguese
- Meaning: clear, bright, famous

Other names
- Related names: Clara, Clarisse, Clarice, Clare, Clair

Clarisse is a female given name borrowed from French, derived from the Italian and Latin name Clarissa, originally denoting a nun of the Roman Catholic Order of St. Clare. It is a combination of St. Clare of Assisi's Latin name Clara (originally meaning "clear" and "bright") and the suffix -issa, equivalent to -ess. Clarice is an anglicization of Clarisse and there are numerous cognate names, including Clara, Clare, and Claire. Notable people and characters with the name include:

== People ==
- Clarisse Agbegnenou (born 1992), French judoka
- Clarisse Albrecht (born 1978), French musical artist
- Clarisse Bader (1840–1902), French writer
- Clarisse Coignet (1823–1918), French moral philosopher, educator, and historian
- Clarisse Cruz (born 1978), Portuguese runner
- Clarisse Crémer (born 1989), French offshore sailor
- Clarisse Doris Hellman (1910–1973), American historian of science
- Clarisse Garcia (basketball) (born 1984), American basketball coach
- Clarisse Herrenschmidt (born 1946), French archaeologist and linguist
- Clarisse Imaniriho, Rwandan politician
- Clarisse Iribagiza (born 1988), Rwandan computer scientist
- Clarisse Le Bihan (born 1994), French professional footballer
- Clarisse Leite (1917–2003), Brazilian composer, pianist and music educator
- Clarisse Loxton Peacock (died 2004), Hungarian-born artist later styled Lady Dunnett
- Clarisse Machanguana (born 1984), Mozambican basketball player and philanthropist
- Clarisse Midroy (1820–1870), French actress
- Clarisse Moh (born 1986), French middle-distance runner
- Clarisse Rasoarizay (born 1971), Malagasy long-distance runner
- Clarisse Ratsifandrihamanana (1926–1987), Malagasy writer
- Clarisse de Souza, Brazilian professor of human–computer interaction
- Clarisse Tremblay (1951–1999), Canadian journalist and poet
- Clarisse Vigoureux (1789–1865), French Fourierist journalist and writer
- Clarisse Yeung (born 1986), Hong Kong politician

== Fictional characters ==
- Clarisse La Rue, a character introduced in Rick Riordan's Percy Jackson & the Olympians
- Clarisse McClellan, a character from Ray Bradbury's novel Fahrenheit 451
- Clarisse Renaldo, a character from Meg Cabot's The Princess Diaries
- Princess Clarisse d'Cagliostro, a character in The Castle of Cagliostro

== See also ==
- Clarisse (disambiguation)
- Clarissa (given name)
