= Clair (surname) =

Clair, also spelt Claire, is a surname of English and French origin. It is derived from the Middle French and Old French cler literally meaning "clear" and "bright" which itself is derived from the Latin clārus of the same meaning.

Notable people with the surname Clair or Claire include:

- Benoît Clair (born 1953), French journalist and writer
- Bernice Claire (1906–2003), stage name of American actress and singer Bernice Jahnigen
- Cyrielle Clair (born 1955), French actress
- Daphne Clair (1939–2026), New Zealand writer
- Davey Claire (1897–1956), American baseball player
- Dorothy Claire (1920–1982), American singer, actress, and radio personality
- Ebba St. Claire (1921-1982), American baseball player
- Fraser Clair (born 1981), Canadian ice hockey player
- Fred Claire (1935–2026), American Major League Baseball executive, general manager of the Los Angeles Dodgers
- Gene Clair (1940–2013), American sound engineer and entrepreneur
- Helen Claire (1911–1974), American actress
- Hilary Claire (1941–2007), English–South African anti-apartheid activist, writer
- Imogen Claire (1943–2005), British dancer, choreographer, actor and dance teacher
- Ina Claire (1893–1985), American actress
- Janete Clair (1925–1983), Brazilian screenwriter
- Jany Clair (born 1938), French actress
- Jean Clair (born 1940), French writer
- Joe Clair (born 1969), American stand-up comedian
- Julia Clair (born 1994), French ski jumper
- Julie Claire (born 1970), American actress
- Maxine Clair (1939–2025), American novelist
- Michel Clair (born 1950), Canadian politician
- Philippe Clair (1930–2020), French film director
- René Clair (1898–1981), French film director and writer
- Sandie Clair (born 1988), French cyclist
- Serge Clair (born 1940), Mauritian politician
- Clair (Hampshire cricketer), English cricketer

== See also ==
- Clare (surname)
