= Clair =

Clair or Claire may refer to:

== People and fictional characters ==
- Claire (given name), including a list of people and fictional characters with the given name Clair or Claire
- Clair (surname), a list of people with the surname Clair or Claire

== Places ==
- Clair, New Brunswick, Canada, a former village, now part of Haut-Madawaska
- Clair Parish, New Brunswick, Canada
- Clair, Saskatchewan, Canada
- Clair oilfield in the Atlantic Ocean, 75 km west of Shetland

== Arts and entertainment ==
- Claire (band), an electronic-pop band using English lyrics from Munich, Germany
- Claire (album), a 2002 album by Claire Sweeney
- "Clair" (song), a 1972 hit for Gilbert O'Sullivan
- Claire (1924 film), a German silent film
- Claire (2001 film), a fantasy film
- Claire (2007 film), written by Drew Seeley
- Clair Obscur: Expedition 33, a 2025 video game

== Other uses ==
- Clair Global, an international sound reinforcement and event technology company
- Council of Local Authorities for International Relations (CLAIR), a Japanese government-affiliated foundation
- Confederation of Laboratories for Artificial Intelligence Research in Europe (CLAIRE), a European organization on artificial intelligence
- Claire (programming language), an object-oriented programming language
- Claire's, a female accessory store

== See also ==
- Clair Lake (disambiguation)
- Clare (disambiguation)
- Clara (disambiguation)
- Eau Claire (disambiguation)
- Saint Clair (disambiguation)
- St. Claire (disambiguation)
