= ML Procise =

- Born: Martin Luther Procise III; June 21, 1952; Fort Wayne, Indiana, United States
- Died: March 5, 2015 (aged 62); Carrollton, Texas, United States
- Occupation: Audio engineer
- Employer(s): Showco (1975–2000); Clair Brothers (2000–15)
- Children: 4

Martin Luther "ML" Procise III (June 21, 1952 – March 5, 2015) was an American audio engineer who mixed more than 4,500 concerts for a wide array of musical artists including the Bee Gees, Michael Jackson/the Jackson 5, and ZZ Top. Procise started his live sound mixing career in 1975 with Showco, his first assignment mixing monitors for Genesis. He continued mixing concerts throughout the 1980s and 1990s, and he increasingly took on a role in company management and sales, becoming the senior director of touring, and the vice president of sales. In 2000 when Clair Brothers bought Showco, Procise was named executive director of touring. In 2014 he was inducted into the Tour Link Top Dog Hall of Fame.

== Early career ==
Procise was born in Fort Wayne, Indiana; working in the field of sound reinforcement was one of his hobbies. He left the city late in 1975 at the age of 23 when a friend working for Showco invited him to mix monitors for an upcoming Genesis tour. At the time, Procise's favorite band was Genesis, so he quickly moved to the Dallas metro area to begin mixing monitors for Genesis as they rehearsed for the A Trick of the Tail Tour. The first tour date was in March 1976.

== Personal life ==
Procise married Deborah R. "Debby" Haley on February 29 (Leap Day) in 1980. The couple honeymooned in June 1980. They had four children: Raleigh, Luke, Parker and Evan. Procise was widowed in 2013 when Debby died of cancer. Procise died quietly in his sleep in the early morning hours of March 5, 2015.
