= Clar =

Clar or CLAR may refer to:

== People ==
=== Given name ===
- Clar Weah (born 1965), First Lady of Liberia

=== Surname ===
- Conrad Clar (1844–1904), Austrian physician, balneologist, and geologist
- Erich Clar (1902–1987), Austrian chemist
- Fanny Clar (1875–1944), French journalist and writer
- Jean-Pierre Clar (born 1942), French rugby player
- Mimi Clar Melnick (1935–2013), American journalist, writer, and jazz host
- Pedro Clar (born 1986), Spanish tennis player and coach
- Walter Clar (born 1994), Paraguayan footballer

== Other uses ==
- BMW CLAR platform, a car platform
- CLÀR, a Scottish Gaelic book publisher

== See also ==
- Clair (disambiguation)
- Clare (disambiguation)
