= James Clare =

James Clare may refer to:

- James Clare (rugby union) (1857–1930)
- James Clare (rugby league) (born 1991)
- Jimmy Clare (born 1959), English footballer

== See also ==
- James Sabben-Clare (1941–2017), headmaster of Winchester College
