= Clarice (disambiguation) =

Clarice is a female given name.

Clarice may also refer to:

- Clarice (TV series)
- "Clarice", song from America (America Album)
- Clarice Smith Performing Arts Center
