= John Clare (disambiguation) =

John Clare (1793–1864) was an English poet

John Clare may also refer to:

- John Clare (journalist) (born 1955), English author and journalist
- John Clare (soccer), American soccer coach

== See also ==
- John Clare Billing (1866–1955), English organist and composer
- John Clare Whitehorn (1894–1974), American psychiatric educator
