= Konold =

Konold is a surname. Notable people with the surname include:

- Claire Konold (1938–2024), American politician
- Wulf Konold (1946–2010), German musicologist, dramaturge, and theatre director

== See also ==
- Kobold
