= Alice Thomas Ellis =

English essayist and novelist (1932–2005)

Alice Thomas Ellis (born Anna Margaret Lindholm; 9 September 1932 – 8 March 2005) was an English writer and essayist. Born in Liverpool, she wrote numerous novels and some non-fiction, including cookery books. She was also known as Mrs. Anna Haycraft.

== Life ==
Ellis was born in Liverpool to John and Alexandra Lindholm. John was half Finnish, and Alexandra half Welsh. She spent part of her childhood as a World War II evacuee in North Wales, a period she wrote about in A Welsh Childhood. Thomas Ellis was educated at Bangor Grammar School and then entered the Liverpool School of Art. A member of the Church of Humanity, Ellis converted to Catholicism at age 19. She then dropped out of art school and spent six months in a convent. However, after she suffered a slipped disc, the religious order expelled her as unable to do physical labour.

In the 1950s she moved to Chelsea in London, where she embraced a Bohemian lifestyle and became known for wearing black. She was working in a coffee shop when she met Colin Haycraft. The couple married in 1956 and eventually had seven children. Their daughter Rosalind died two days after birth. Their son Joshua spent ten months in a coma after falling off a roof, dying at age 19 in 1978. Ellis dedicated her poem "The Birds of the Air" to Joshua, with the inscription:

All his beauty, wit and grace
Lie forever in one place.
He who sang and sprang and moved
Now, in death, is only loved.

In 1968, Haycraft and a partner bought Gerald Duckworth and Company, a publishing house in London. Ellis became its fiction editor. Her most famous client was Beryl Bainbridge, who worked with Ellis for many years. The author Clare Colvin, in Ellis's obituary in The Guardian, described her skills as an editor:

She combined a novelist's imagination with an editor's forensic skills, getting immediately to the heart of the problem, with an observation such as, "Lovely characters, darling, but where's the plot?"

Her first novel, The Sin Eater (1977) appeared under the pseudonym Alice Thomas Ellis, which she used in all her later writing. Probably her best-known novel, Unexplained Laughter (1985), was adapted for UK television, as was her Summerhouse Trilogy. Her novel The 27th Kingdom (1982) was shortlisted for the Booker Prize. In a New York Times article, Margalit Fox described her work:

Shot through with melancholy, Ms. Ellis's novels focus on the small savageries, deep discontents and abiding grief of women's lives. Yet they are also mordantly funny sendups of bourgeois manners. Sometimes, as in the work of Shirley Jackson, the gothic overlays the domestic, to unsettling effect. Many of Ms. Ellis's characters are repellent, and they are meant to be.

Ellis's cookery books include All-natural Baby Food (Fontana/Collins, 1977) and Darling, you shouldn't have gone to so much trouble, co-written with Caroline Blackwood. Blackwood and her poet husband, Robert Lowell, were frequent visitors to the Haycraft home.

Her Home Life column in The Spectator was republished in four volumes. All her work was livened by a dry, dark sense of humour. As she put it, "There is no reciprocity. Men love women. Women love children. Children love hamsters. Hamsters don't love anyone".

As a traditionalist Catholic, Ellis disliked the Second Vatican Council changes in church practices. In one book, she described them as "tide of sewage" and "Protestantized happy-clappy stuff." She was a sharp critic of what she saw as abuses of liturgy and practice that watered down the faith. She claimed that since the change from the Tridentine Mass, she could barely bring herself to attend church on Sundays. Though her fiction often seems feminist, with women usually the leads, she opposed what she viewed as radical feminist activism in the Church. As a regular columnist of the Catholic Herald newspaper, Ellis in 1996 criticised Derek Worlock, the former Archbishop of Liverpool, shortly after his death, accusing him of responsibility for a strong fall in church attendance in the previous decade. Infuriated by her comments, Cardinal Basil Hume pressed the Catholic Herald to restrict her columns to cookery.

In 1995, Ellis's husband died, after which she moved from London to their farmhouse in Powys, Wales. She became a Fellow of the Royal Society of Literature in 1999. She was treated for lung cancer in 2003 and died of the disease two years later, on 8 March 2005. She was 72 years old.

== Fiction ==
- The Sin Eater, 1977
- The Birds of the Air, 1980
- The 27th Kingdom, 1982
- The Other Side of the Fire, 1983
- Unexplained Laughter, 1985
- The Clothes in the Wardrobe, 1987 (Summerhouse Trilogy I)
- The Skeleton in the Cupboard, 1988 (Summerhouse Trilogy II)
- The Fly in the Ointment, 1990 (Summerhouse Trilogy III)
- The Inn at the Edge of the World, 1990
- Pillars of Gold, 1992
- The Evening of Adam, 1994 (stories)
- Fairy Tale, 1996
- Hotel Lucifer, 1999
