= Claire Williams (disambiguation) =

Claire Williams may refer to:

== People ==
- Claire Williams Harris (born 1976; as Claire Williams) team leader of Formula One team Williams Racing
- Claire Williams (athlete) (born 1987) Paralympian for Wales
- Ann Claire Williams (born 1949) United States circuit judge
- Julia Claire Williams (pageant princess), 2016 awardee at the Miss Louisiana's Outstanding Teen
- Colette Claire Williams (politician) for the Respect Party, who ran in the 2014 Manchester City Council election
- Claire Williams (actress), actress noted for performing with animated characters in 1977
- Claire Williams (soccer), footballer for the Millwall Lionesses in the 2005–06 FA Women's Premier League

== Fictional characters ==
- Claire Williams (Fringe character), a fictional character from The Fringe 2008 season 2 number 6 episode "The Cure" (Fringe)
- Claire Williams (Diamond Horseshoe character), a fictional character portrayed by Beatrice Kay from 1945 film Diamond Horseshoe
- Claire Williams (Voices character), a fictional character from the 1973 horror film Voices (1973 film)

== See also ==
- claire (disambiguation)
- williams (disambiguation)
