= Clare Abbott =

Clare Abbott may refer to:

- Clare Abbott (artist) (1921–2008), British-South African wildlife artist and illustrator
- Clare Abbott (equestrian) (born 1986), Irish eventing rider
