= 1883 in association football =

The following are the association football events of the year 1883 throughout the world.

== Clubs founded ==
=== England ===
Andover
Ashington
Belper Town
Buckingham Town
Bourne Town FC
Bognor Regis Town
Bristol Rovers
Coventry City
Darlington
Gloucester City
Stockport County
Thame United F.C.

=== Netherlands ===
FC Dordrecht

== Domestic cups ==
Nation	Tournament	Winner	Score	Runner-up	Venue	Title	Last title won
England	1882–83 FA Cup	Blackburn Olympic	2-1 (after extra time)	Old Etonians	Kennington Oval	1st	None
Ireland	1882–83 Irish Cup	Cliftonville	5-0	Ulster	Bloomfield Ground	1st	None
Scotland	1882–83 Scottish Cup	Dumbarton	2-1 (replay after 2-2 draw)	Vale of Leven	Hampden Park	1st	None
Wales	1882–83 Welsh Cup	Wrexham	1-0	Druids	The Racecourse	2nd	1878

== Births ==
- 15 January – James Stewart (d. 1958), England international forward in three matches (1907–1911), scoring two goals.
- 25 February – Herbert Burgess (d. 1954), England international full-back in four matches (1904–1906).
- 29 July – Fred Pentland (d. 1962), England international forward in five matches (1909).
- 23 August – Jesse Pennington (d. 1970), England international full-back in 25 matches (1907–1920).
- 8 September – George Wilson (d. 1960), Scotland international forward in six matches (1904–1909).
- 21 September – Edwin Clare (d. 1944), English professional footballer
- 2 November – Evelyn Lintott (d. 1916), England international half-back in seven matches (1908–1909).
- 14 December – Dicky Bond (d. 1955), England international forward in eight matches (1905–1910), scoring two goals.
- 26 December – Alec McNair (d. 1951), Scotland international full-back in fifteen matches (1906–1920).
