= Duroliponte =

Roman town which became Cambridge

Coordinates: 52°12′45″N 0°06′51″E

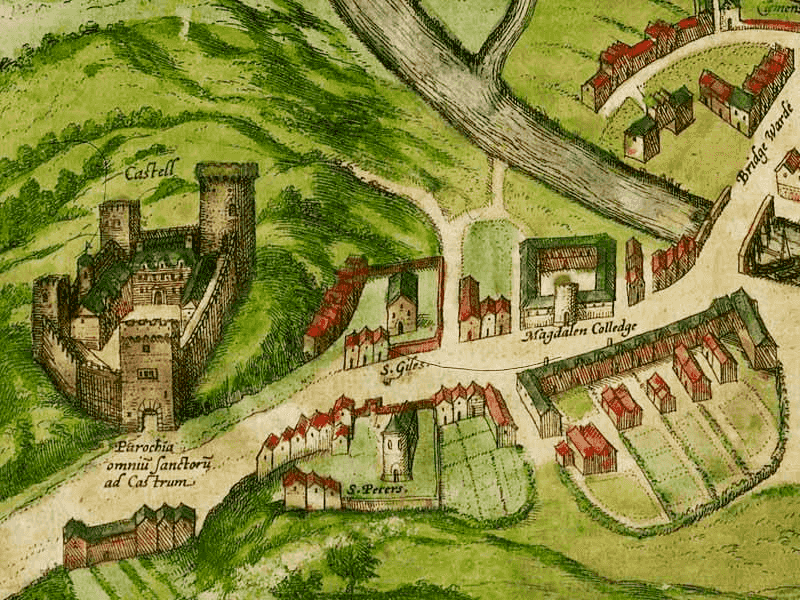
1575 engraving showing the site of Duroliponte between Cambridge Castle and the bridge

Duroliponte or Durolipons was a small town in the Roman province of Britannia on the site of what is now the city of Cambridge.

The site of Roman Cambridge is located on Castle Hill, just northwest of the city centre. The fort (Latin: castrum) was bounded on two sides by the lines formed by the present Mount Pleasant, continuing across Huntingdon Road into Clare Street. The eastern side followed Magrath Avenue, with the southern side running near to Chesterton Lane and Kettle's Yard before turning northwest at Honey Hill.

It was originally an Iron Age hillfort in which the Romans may have constructed a small military station about AD 70. The settlement seems to have become civilian in nature around fifty years later. Most of the buildings discovered so far were of timber construction. They had both tiled and thatched roofs and some had painted plaster internal walls. Only one stone building has been located. The town went into decline during the 3rd century, but expanded after its walled defences were put in place a hundred years later. There were four gates and a cemetery to the south. Occupation seems to have continued until the Roman departure from Britain around 410, but it has been identified as the Cair Grauth listed among the 28 cities of Britain by the History of the Britons (Note: Although note that Bishop Ussher believed that listing to refer to the Cambridge in Gloucestershire.) and the invading Saxons had begun occupying the area by the end of the century.

The settlement was served by the River Cam (then still known as the Granta) and two Roman roads: Akeman Street ran from Ermine Street north east through Cambridge to The Fens and the Via Devana ran northwest through the town on its way to Godmanchester.
