= & You Revolution =

& YOU revolution

EP by sifow
- Released: 15 February 2006
- Recorded: 2005–2006
- Genres: Dance, J-pop
- Length: 23:29
- Labels: Avex Trax; RZCD-45050 (Japan, CD)

Sifow chronology
& YOU revolution (2006)	Clarity (2006)

& YOU revolution is Sifow's first mini album, and was self-released in early 2006. It contains various self-released songs from the previous year.

& YOU revolution peaked at No. 281 on the Oricon Charts.

== Track listing ==
1. "Jewel" – 5:01
2. "& YOU revolution" – 5:01
3. "I Uta" ("I謡") – 4:00
4. "Mermaid Story" ("マーメィドストーリィ") – 3:54
5. "Apple ~Aka Ringo~" ("Apple ~Red Apple~", "Apple～赤りんご～") – 5:32
