= Clarissa (given name) =

- Gender: Female

Origin
- Origin: Latin, Italian, Portuguese
- Meaning: clear, bright, famous

Other names
- Related names: Clara, Clarisse, Clarice, Clare, Clair

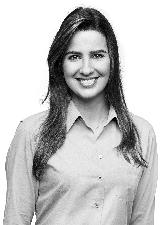
Clarissa Garotinho, Brazilian politician and journalist, born 1982

Clarissa is a female given name borrowed from Latin, Italian, and Portuguese. It is a combination of St. Clare of Assisi's Latin name Clara (originally meaning "clear" and "bright") and the suffix -issa, equivalent to -ess. Clarice is an anglicization of Clarisse, the French form of the same name. Clarisa is the Spanish form of the name, and Klárisza the Hungarian. The given names Clara, Clare, and Claire are all cognates of this name.

== Notable people ==
- Clara Barton (Clarissa Harlowe Barton, 1821–1912), American humanitarian who founded the American Red Cross
- Clarissa Britain (1816–1895), American inventor
- Clarissa Danforth (1792–1855), first woman ordained as a Free Will Baptist minister
- Clarissa Davis (born 1967), American coach and women's basketball hall-of-famer
- Clarissa Dickson Wright (1947–2014), English celebrity chef
- Clarissa F. Dye (1832–1921), Civil War nurse from Philadelphia
- Clarissa Eden, Countess of Avon (1920–2021)
- Clarissa Pinkola Estés (born 1945), American writer and Jungian psychoanalyst
- Clarissa Herbst (born 1981), German politician
- Clarissa Kaye (1931–1994), Australian stage, film and television actress
- Clarissa Caldwell Lathrop (1847–1892), American social reformer, autobiographer
- Clarissa Stadler (born 1966), Austrian journalist, moderator and writer
- Clarissa Ward (born 1980), British-American television journalist
- Clarissa Wei, American journalist and writer

== Fictional characters ==
- Clarissa Darling from Clarissa Explains It All, a children's TV show in the 1990s
- Clarissa Dalloway in Mrs Dalloway, a 1925 novel by Virginia Woolf
- Clarissa "Clary" Fray in The Mortal Instruments novel series
- Clarissa Harlowe, the heroine of Samuel Richardson's 1748 tragic epistolary novel Clarissa, or, the History of a Young Lady
- Clarissa Hailsham-Brown in Spider's Web, a 1954 play by Agatha Christie
- Clarissa Mao in The Expanse (novel series), and its TV adaptation The Expanse (TV series)
- Clarissa Mellon in Enduring Love, a 1997 novel by Ian McEwan
- Clarissa Saunders in Mr. Smith Goes to Washington, a 1939 film
- Clarissa Stamp in Murder on the Leviathan, a 1998 novel by Boris Akunin
- Clarissa Vaughan in The Hours, a 2002 film directed by Stephen Daldry, based on the novel by Michael Cunningham

== See also ==
- Clarissa (disambiguation)
