= Clare, Mpumalanga =

Clare
- Location within Mpumalanga Location within South Africa
- Coordinates: 24°38′S 31°18′E
- Country: South Africa
- Province: Mpumalanga
- District: Ehlanzeni
- Municipality: Bushbuckridge

Area
  - Total: 3.40 km^{2} (1.31 sq mi)

Population (2011)
  - Total: 9,586
  - Density: 2,820/km^{2} (7,300/sq mi)
- Time zone: UTC+2 (SAST)

Clare is a town in Bushbuckridge Local Municipality, Mpumalanga, South Africa. It lies south of the R531, west of Hluvukani. It is divided into Clare A, B & C; which together have a population of 9,586.
