= Clare Valley (disambiguation) =

Clare Valley may refer to:

== South Australia ==
- Clare Valley
- Clare Valley Aerodrome
- Clare Valley Racecourse
- Clare Valley wine region

== Elsewhere ==
- Clare Valley, Saint Vincent and the Grenadines, a town in Saint Vincent

== See also ==
- Clare (disambiguation)
