= Clarisse =

Clarisse may refer to:

== People and characters ==
- Clarisse (given name)
- Eddy Clarisse (born 1972), a retired badminton player from Mauritius
- Clarisse La Rue, a character in Percy Jackson & the Olympians
- Clarisse McClellan, a character in the Ray Bradbury novel Fahrenheit 451
- Clarisse Midroy (1820–1870), French actress known simply as Clarisse
- Princess Clarisse, a character in The Castle of Cagliostro

== Other ==
- Clarisse House, the official residence of the Prime Minister of Mauritius
- Clarisses, an early name for the Poor Clares

== See also ==
- Clarissa (disambiguation)
