= Clarissa =

Clarissa may refer to:

- Clarissa (given name), a female given name
- Clarissa; or, The History of a Young Lady, a novel by Samuel Richardson
- Clarissa (1941 film), a German romance film
- Clarissa (2026 film), an American drama film
- Clarissa (TV series), a British television drama series based on Richardson's novel
- Clarissa, Minnesota, a small city in the United States
- 302 Clarissa, an asteroid
- Clarissa, an opera based on the Richardson novel by Robin Holloway
- Clarissa, an unfinished novel by Stefan Zweig
- Clarissa, a genus of sawflies in the family Pergidae

== See also ==
- Clarisse (disambiguation)
