= Clarisse Coignet =

French moral philosopher, educator, and historian

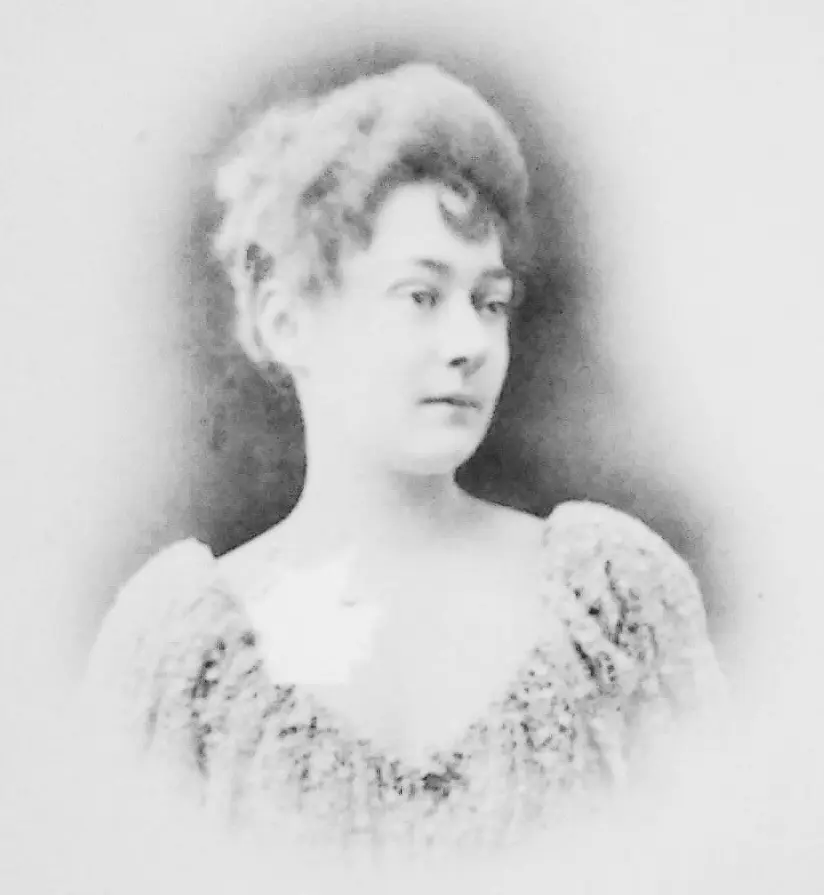
- Born: 1823; Montagney, France
- Died: 1918 (aged 94–95); Dampierre-sur-le-Doubs
- Occupations: Philosopher, educator, and historian
- Known for: Independent morality theory, public education
- Spouse: François Coignet
- Children: Lucy Coignet

Clarisse Coignet (1823–1918) was a French moral philosopher, educator, and historian. She was also associated with the social and political movement called La Morale independante, which advanced the idea that morality is independent from science and religion.

== Background ==
Coignet was born in Montagney, a commune of Rougemont. Her father Joseph Gauthier, was a master blacksmith while her mother Virginie Génisset was a professor of Latin literature at a university in Besançon. She was also the niece of the writer Clarisse Vigoureux and a cousin of Victor Considerant.

In 1850, Coignet married Francois Coignet, a noted French civil engineer and industrialist. The couple had three children, including Lucy Coignet, the wife of Count Gérando-Teleki.

== Public education ==
Coignet is considered an important figure in the French socio-political movement called La Morale independente, which emerged in the 18th century. Particularly, she exerted her influence when she became the editor of the newspaper that promoted its agenda, which focused on the liberal ideals of the French Revolution and the secularization of education.

Coignet's early works had been influenced by the reform of the French educational system after the proclamation of the French Third Republic. This is, for example, demonstrated in her defense of the public education published in 1856 as well as her account of the life of Elisa Grimailh Lemonnier, an educator who founded professional schools for young women. In 1873, she criticized Catholicism as "the most powerful expression of intellectual despotism the human mind has ever presented".

Coignet is also known for her biographical account of her relatives, such as Clarisse Vigoureux and her cousin Victor and his socialist politics.

== Independent Morality ==
Coignet proposed her idea of evolving independent morality, which reflected the issues addressed in the philosophical discussions of her time. Her main argument was that morality should not be grounded in science or religion since it is produced by humans. She primarily explored this theory in the published work called La Morale independante dans son principe et son objet (1869), which was also partly influenced by Immanuel Kant. This work emerged from her writings for the La Morale independante newspaper.

Coignet's theory identified the concept of freedom as the basis of internal morality, one that is distinguished from external morality, which is derived from philosophy or natural science. This was explained in the case of a tribal chief who constantly beats his wife. The woman puts a stop to it when she realized her worth and her freedom, allowing her to regard her husband with reproach, awakening his conscience as a result. According to the thinker, freedom is an irreducible first principle of human existence and, hence, of moral science.

Coignet further clarified her arguments on morality and religion in the book De Kant a Bergson: reconciliation de la religion et de la science dans un spiritualisme nouveu (1911).
