= Concert 10 =

Rock concert in the United States

- Genre: Rock, heavy metal
- Dates: July 8 and 9 of 1972
- Locations: Pocono International Raceway in Long Pond, Pennsylvania, U.S.
- Founders: Concert 10, Inc., Irving Reiss, George Charak
- Attendance: 200,000+

Concert 10 was a rock concert at Pocono International Raceway in Long Pond, Pennsylvania, on July 8 and 9, 1972. The event attracted an estimated 200,000 people who were met with hot weather, then cold and a downpour replete with rain and mud. The general atmosphere of the concert was compared to the Woodstock Festival of 1969. Concert 10 represented a successful revival of the American summer rock festival after the repeated failure of U.S. festivals during the previous two years.

== History ==
Concert production was handled by Concert 10, Inc. First time concert producers Irving Reiss, vice president of the Candygram Company, and attorney George Charak put US$250,000 in escrow to avoid problems paying the artists faced by previous festivals. The festival-scale sound and lighting systems, the vast double stage and the associated specialized crews were provided by Showco, an international touring concert production company based in Dallas, TX. 300 security people backed by University karate clubs maintained order, and the raceway's hospital was staffed by six physicians and eight nurses. 65 people from the Lackawanna County Drug Council were on site to handle adverse drug reactions (bad trips) from recreational drug users. The concert was promoted with radio commercials on rock music radio stations in New York, New Jersey, and Pennsylvania. Concert ticket prices were set at US$11, with 90,000 tickets sold in advance of the show.

The July 8 concert was scheduled from 1:00 to 11:00 p.m., but due to intermittent weather-related delays, ended at 8:45 a.m. on July 9.

== Performers ==
Black Sabbath and Badfinger were scheduled to appear, but canceled. According to Don Heckman of the New York Times, Edgar Winter's band received the greatest reaction from the audience, with long, bluesy rock jams like "Tobacco Road".

July 8

- Mother Night – 1:00 p.m.
- Claire Hamill
- The Groundhogs
- Ramatam (w/ Mitch Mitchell) – 6:00 p.m.
- Bull Angus
- Cactus
- Edgar Winter – 10:00 p.m.
- LACE PAVEMENT – 9:00 p.m.

July 9

- Emerson, Lake & Palmer – 4:00 a.m. The entire ELP performance was recorded and released on CD box set in 2017.
- Faces w/ Rod Stewart – 5:00 a.m.
- Humble Pie
- The J. Geils Band
- Three Dog Night – 7:40 a.m.

== See also ==
- List of historic rock festivals
