= Sifow =

Japanese singer (born 1985)

Sifow シーフォウ
- Born: 藤田 志穂 (Fujita Shiho); May 11, 1985 (age 41)
- Origin: Chiba, Japan
- Genres: Pop
- Occupations: Singer, businesswoman
- Years active: 2005–2007

Shiho Fujita (Japanese: 藤田 志穂, romanized: Fujita Shiho; born May 11, 1985), known by her stage name Sifow (stylized as sifow), is a former Japanese pop singer, model and businesswoman. She signed to the Avex Trax music label in 2006, but in 2008 she announced her retirement from the music industry. She has since focused on business and health advocacy, and established Office G-Revo Corporation in 2010.

== Discography ==
=== Studio albums ===
Year	Information	Oricon weekly peak position
2006	Clarity: Released: September 13, 2006	299
2007	Love Spell: Released: August 15, 2007	—

=== Mini albums ===
Year	Information	Oricon weekly peak position
2006	& You Revolution: Released: February 15, 2006; Self-released album	281

=== Singles ===
Year	Title	Album
2005	"I Uta" ^{†}	& You Revolution
2005	"Mermaid Story" ^{†}	& You Revolution
2005	"Apple: Ao Ringo" ^{†}	—
2005	"Apple: Aka Ringo" ^{†}	& You Revolution
2006	"Clover"	Clarity
2006	"Love & Peace"	Clarity
2007	"Carat"	Love Spell
2007	"Rule"	Love Spell
2007	"Natsu Hanabi"	Love Spell

- ^{†} = singles released before Sifow's debut under Avex Trax
