= Claire (2001 film) =

2001 film by Milford Thomas

- Region 1 DVD Cover
- Directed by: Milford Thomas
- Written by: Milford Thomas
- Produced by: Milford Thomas
- Starring: Toniet Gallego; Mish P. DeLight; James Ferguson; Pat Bell; Katherine Moore; Anna May Hirsch; Allen Jeffrey Rein
- Cinematography: Jonathan Mellinger
- Edited by: Anne Richardson
- Release date: November 2001
- Running time: 57 minutes
- Country: United States
- Language: No dialogue

Claire is a 2001 film directed by Milford Thomas.

The story itself is loosely based on Kaguyahime, on an old Japanese fairy tale about an elderly childless couple that finds a child from the Moon in a stalk of bamboo and raises her as their own. Thomas’ version tells a tale of an elderly male couple on a farm in the rural 1920s South who find the moon princess in an ear of corn. Thomas took the prize for Best First Feature (Special Mention) with this little number at the San Francisco International Lesbian & Gay Film Festival in 2002. Claire is an homage to early cinema. Accompanied by its silent-era camera, all set-design and special effects were achieved the old-fashioned way. Canvas backgrounds are present, alongside semi-hidden wires, multiple exposures and was filmed with a hand-cranked 35mm camera.

== Plot ==
When the curtains open, viewers find themselves caught within a nightmare that strongly contrasts the dreaminess of sequences to come: a young girl's birthday party is cruelly interrupted by Josh's (Mish P. DeLight) loss of custody over her. He wakes in a fright and squeezes the hand of his husband (James Ferguson) for comfort. Early on, a theme in Claire is identified here: the transcendence of love beyond social norms. The audience is briefly walked through the pair's daily routine. One exception emerges after the couple has lain down the following night: the appearance of Claire; their unexpected miracles, just a tiny thing inside an iridescent ear of corn. As the story progresses and Claire grows into the shape of a young woman, she enchants onlookers with her beauty and readings of fantastic poetry in various languages. Richard (Allen Jeffrey Rein) is particularly entranced; and gives her his copy of Shelley's work as a token. It is in him that Claire discovers her miraculous healing powers proceeding his dive from a cliff in an attempt to win her affection. While exemplifying the nontraditional family---two men lovingly raising a child of the Moon---the film celebrates the diversity of family and also addresses the grief of losing a loved one.

== Cast ==
- Toniet Gallego as Claire, on whom this story revolves
- Mish P. DeLight as Josh, one of the men that find Claire in a cornstalk whom adopts her as his own
- James Ferguson as Walt, husband to Josh; Claire's second father
- Allen Jeffrey Rein as Richard, Claire's (almost) romantic interest
- Pat Bell as the antagonist of the story
- Anna May Hirsch as Miss Earwood
- Katherine Moore as Kat

== Soundtrack ==
The film is accompanied solely by Orchestra De Lune conducted by Anne Richardson. It was performed live when the film was originally shown at the San Francisco International Lesbian & Gay Film Festival.
