= Montagney =

- Commune
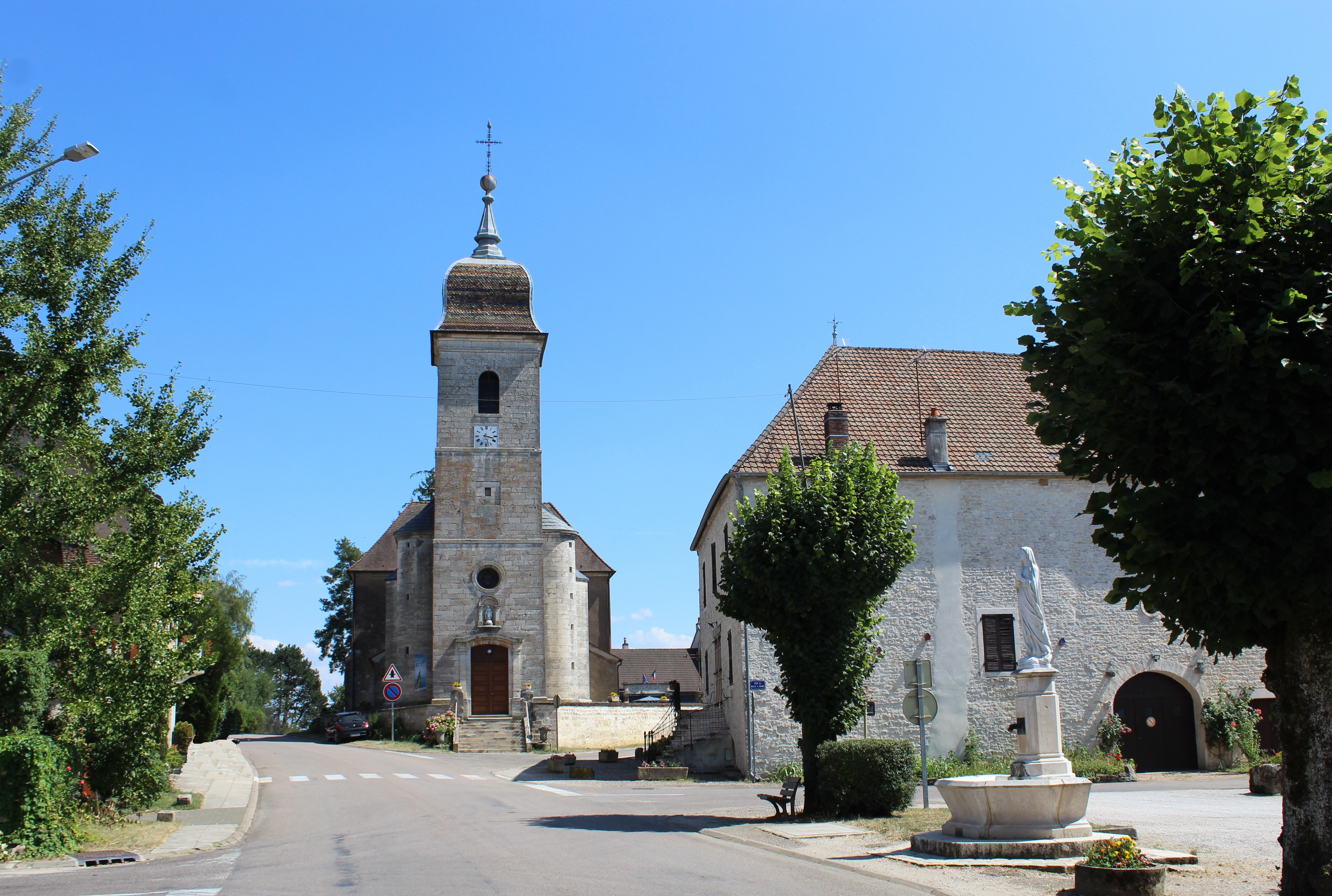
- The church in Montagney

- Coat of arms
- Location of Montagney
- Location within France Location within Bourgogne-Franche-Comté
- Coordinates: 47°17′14″N 5°39′43″E
- Country: France
- Region: Bourgogne-Franche-Comté
- Department: Haute-Saône
- Arrondissement: Vesoul
- Canton: Marnay

Government
  - Mayor (2020–2026): Yann Beuraud
- Area^{1}: 9.21 km^{2} (3.56 sq mi)
- Highest elevation: 282 m (925 ft)
- Lowest elevation: 192 m (630 ft)
- Population (2023): 488
  - Density: 53.0/km^{2} (137/sq mi)
- Time zone: UTC+01:00 (CET)
  - Summer (DST): UTC+02:00 (CEST)
- INSEE/Postal code: 70353 /70140
- ^{1} French Land Register data, which excludes lakes, ponds, glaciers > 1 km^{2} (0.386 sq mi or 247 acres) and river estuaries.

Montagney (French pronunciation: [mɔ̃taɲɛ]) is a commune in the Haute-Saône department in the region of Bourgogne-Franche-Comté in eastern France.

== See also ==
- Communes of the Haute-Saône department
