= Hilary Claire =

English–South African anti-apartheid activist, educationist and writer

Hilary Claire (1941–2007) was an English–South African anti-apartheid activist, educationist and writer.

== Life ==
Hilary Claire was born in Erith on 4 November 1941, into a middle-class Jewish family. In 1942 the family was relocated to southern Africa, where her father came from. She was educated at Roedean School in Johannesburg and the University of Witwatersrand, where her mother was professor of French. Though she won an open exhibition to St Hugh's College, Oxford, she discontinued study there to return to South Africa and marry Ronnie Mutch. The pair joined the African Resistance Movement, and were forced to flee to Botswana when the organisation was broken up in 1964.

Returning to London, Claire took a mixture of jobs before studying for a primary school teaching diploma at Goldsmiths College in 1971–72 and teaching at Henry Fawcett School in South London from 1972 to 1977. In 1980 she gained an advanced diploma in the psychology of education at the Institute of Education. She taught at the Inner London Education Authority's centre for urban educational studies from 1981 to 1983, and then became the deputy head of Bolingbroke primary school in southwest London. Moving into teacher education, she worked at the Sussex Institute of Higher Education, Ealing education authority, the Open University and South Bank University.

In 1997 she joined London Metropolitan University, teaching history and citizenship education to primary and secondary school teachers. She died on 26 June 2007.

== Works ==
- (with Phillida Salmon) Classroom collaboration, 1984
- (ed. with Janet Maybin & Joan Swann) Equality matters: case studies from the primary schools, 1993
- Reclaiming Our Pasts: Equality and Diversity in the Primary History Curriculum, 1995
- Not Aliens: primary school children and the citizenship/PSHE curriculum, 2001
- Teaching Citizenship in Primary School, 2004
- The Song Remembers When, South Africa, 2006
- (ed.) The Challenge of Teaching Controversial Issues, 2007
