= Clarice =

Clarice is a female given name, an anglicization of the French Clarisse, derived from the Latin and Italian name Clarissa, which ultimately derives from clara ("clear" and "bright"). It can also be a female form of the male name Clarence.

It may refer to:

== People ==
=== Pre-modern world ===
- Clarice Orsini (1450–1488), wife of Lorenzo de' Medici and mother of Pope Leo X
- Clarice de' Medici (1493–1528), noblewoman from Florence, granddaughter of Lorenzo de' Medici

=== Modern world ===
- Clarice Assad (born 1978), Brazilian composer
- Clarice Beckett (1887–1935), Australian painter
- Clarice Benini (1905–1976), Italian chess master
- Clarice Blackburn (1921–1995), American actress
- Clarice Carson (1929–2015), Canadian opera singer
- Clarice Cliff (1899–1972), British ceramic artist
- Clarice Y. Hashimoto, American politician
- Clarice Herzog (born 1941), Brazilian sociologist and human rights activist
- Clarice Lispector (1920–1977), Ukrainian writer naturalized in Brazil.
- Clarice Mayne (1886–1966), English actress
- Clarice McLean (born 1936), American dancer
- Clarice Modeste-Curwen (born 1945), Grenadian politician
- Clarice Morant (1904–2009), American centenarian and caretaker
- Clarice Osiecki (1934–2007), American politician
- Clarice Phelps, African-American nuclear chemist
- Clarice Shaw (1883–1946), Scottish politician
- Clarice Taylor (1917–2011), American actress
- Clarice Tinsley (born 1954), American journalist
- Clarice Vance (1870–1961), American actress

== Fictional characters ==
- Milady "Clarice" de Winter, one of the main antagonists of The Three Musketeers
- Clarice Starling, in the Hannibal Lecter series
- Clarice, in the short film Two Chips and a Miss and the Chip 'n' Dale: Park Life TV series
