= Clare Hall =

Clare Hall may refer to:

== United Kingdom ==
- Clare Hall, Cambridge, a constituent college of the University of Cambridge
- Clare College, Cambridge, a constituent college of the University of Cambridge, originally called Clare Hall
- Clare Hall Manor, a former health facility in Hertfordshire, England
- Clare Town Hall, Suffolk, a municipal building in Suffolk, England

== Elsewhere ==
- Clare Town Hall (New York), a museum in Clare, New York, United States
- Clare Hall, a city in Antigua and Barbuda
- Clarehall Shopping Centre, in Coolock, Dublin, Ireland
