= Claire Cupples =

Canadian microbiologist

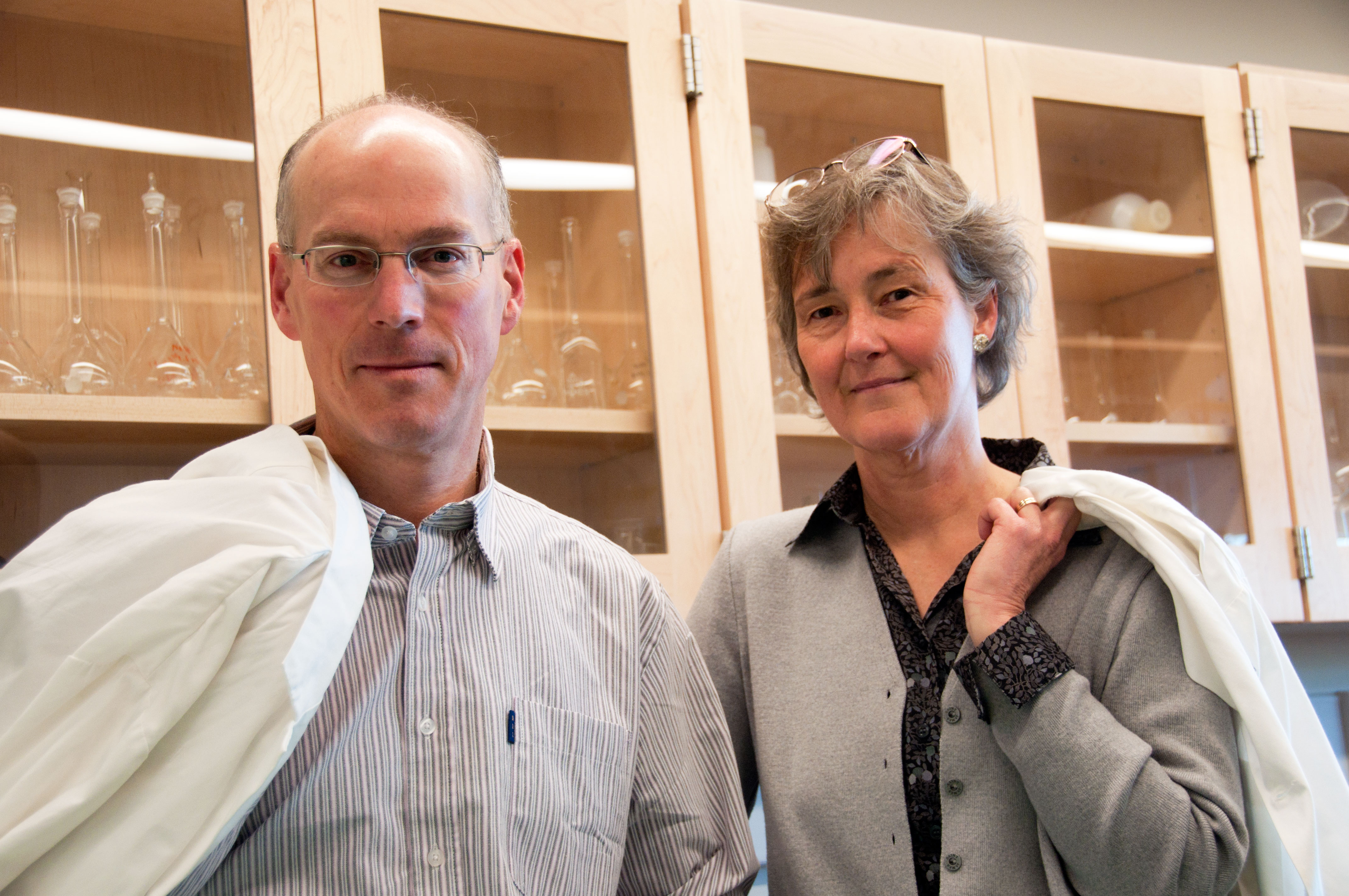
- Cupples and George Agnes in 2012
- Spouse: Will Cupples

Academic background
- Education: BSc, University of Victoria; MSc., University of Calgary; PhD, York University
- Thesis: Structure and rearrangement of the actin gene from Tetrahymena thermophila (1986)

Claire Georgina Cupples (nee Wilson) is a Canadian microbiologist. She is a Professor in the Department of Molecular Biology and Biochemistry at Simon Fraser University. Her research focuses on the causes, consequences and prevention of mutations in microbes and in humans.

== Career ==
After conducting her postdoctoral at the University of California, Los Angeles, Cupples accepted an assistant professor position at Concordia University in 1989. Her research at Concordia focused on DNA and molecular biology. She stayed in this position until the 1997-98 academic year, when she was appointed acting chair of the Biology Department. By 2002, she was promoted to Full professor.

In 2003, Cupples accepted a position as a professor in the Department of Biochemistry and Microbiology at the University of Victoria (UVic). The next year, she received a $292,432 grant to research how cells repair damage to their DNA. She was appointed UVics Acting Dean of Science in 2009. She stayed in her role there until 2010, when she was appointed Simon Fraser University's (SFU's) Faculty of Science dean. Three years later, she was nominated for the 2013 YWCA Women of Distinction Award.

== Personal life ==
Cupples met her future husband Will Cupples while conducing undergraduate research at the University of Victoria.

== Selected publications ==
- Very-Short-Patch Repair in Escherichia coli Requires the dam Adenine Methylase
- The Escherichia coli mismatch repair protein MutL recruits the Vsr and MutH endonucleases in response to DNA damage.
- Physical and functional interactions between Escherichia coli MutL and the Vsr repair endonuclease.
