= Clarice Morant =

Clarice Morant (August 29, 1904 – June 10, 2009), also known as Classie, was an American centenarian from Washington, D.C., who gained national media attention for her role as caregiver to Rozzie Laney, Morant's younger sister diagnosed with Alzheimer's disease, and Ira Barber, Morant's younger brother diagnosed with dementia and suffering the aftereffects of a disabling stroke.
