= Claire (band) =

German band

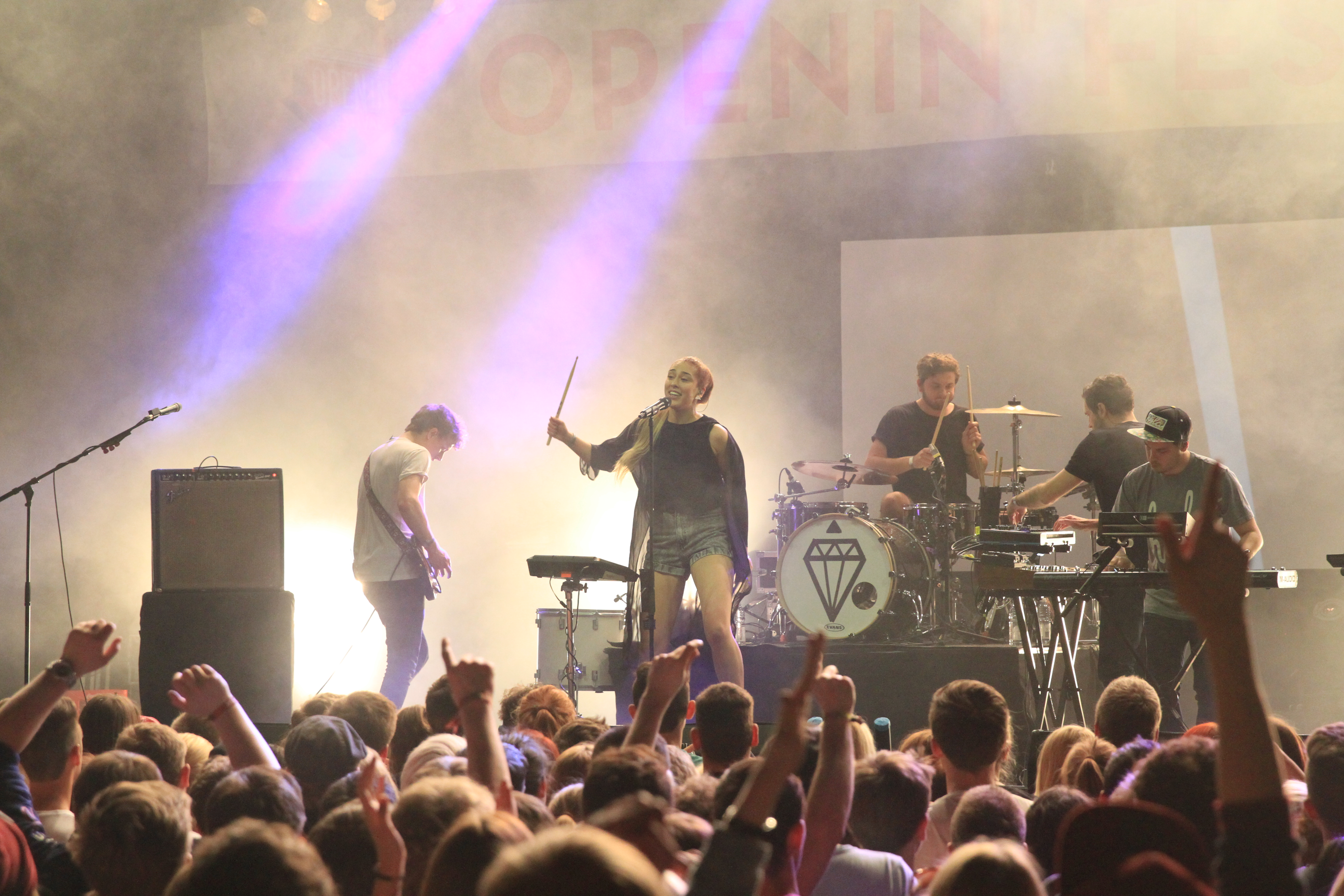
- Claire at the Openin Festival 2014

Background information
- Origin: Munich, Germany
- Genres: Electropop
- Years active: 2012–present
- Members: Josie-Claire Bürkle; Matthias Hauck; Nepomuk Heller; Florian Kiermaier; Fridolin Achten
- Website: claireofficial.com

Claire is an electropop band from Munich, Germany.

== History ==
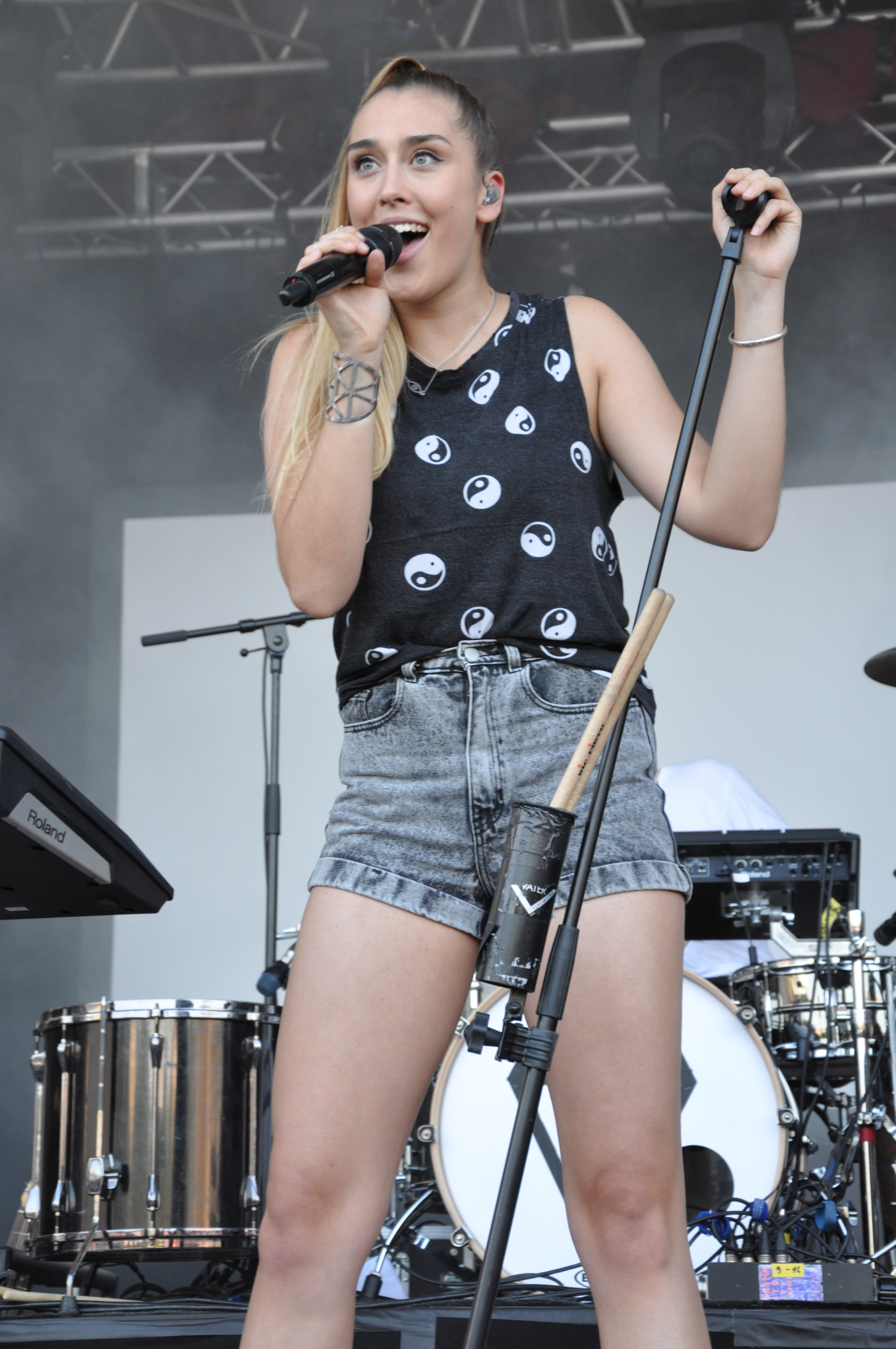
Josie-Claire Bürkle at Oben Ohne Open Air 2014

In 2012, three musicians and producers Matthias Hauck, Heller Nepomuk and Florian Kiermaier found Josie-Claire Buerkle to sing for a film project with their shared recording studios. This was a result of her participation in the TV show The Voice of Germany the year before, and her subsequent search for a band. Out of their film project emerged the band. The fifth member of the band, drummer Fridolin Achten, joined shortly after.

They had immediate Internet success with their first volume, the EP Games, helping them to get a recording contract with Capitol Records, part of Universal Music Group. In the summer of 2013, they had an initial moderate success with the title song of their EP in the German charts. At the end of September they released their debut LP, entitled The Great Escape, which debuted at number 38 on the album charts.

== Band members ==
- Josie-Claire Bürkle – vocals
- Matthias Hauck – keyboards
- Nepomuk Heller – keyboards
- Florian Kiermaier – guitar
- Fridolin Achten – drums

== Discography ==
=== Studio albums ===
Title	Details
The Great Escape	Released: 27 September 2013; Label: Island
Tides	Released: 7 April 2017; Label: Island

=== Extended plays ===
Title	Details
Games	Released: 28 June 2013; Label: Island
Broken Promise Land	Released: 24 September 2013; Label: Astralwerks
Raseiniai	Released: 30 October 2015; Label: Island

=== Singles ===
- "Pioneers" (2012)
- "Games" (2013)
- "The Next Ones to Come" (2013)
- "Overdrive" (2013)
