= Hluvukani =

Hluvukani Tsakani(Clara B)
- Location within Mpumalanga Location within South Africa
- Coordinates: 24.6456°S 31.3498°E
- Country: South Africa
- Province: Mpumalanga
- District: Ehlanzeni
- Municipality: Bushbuckridge

Area
  - Total: 7.67 km^{2} (2.96 sq mi)

Population (2011)
  - Total: 9,631
  - Density: 1,260/km^{2} (3,250/sq mi)

Racial makeup (2011)
  - Black African: 99.5%
  - Coloured: 0.2%
  - Indian/Asian: 0.2%
  - White: 0.1%

First languages (2011)
  - Tsonga: 94.9%
  - Sotho: 3.3%
  - Other: 1.8%
- Time zone: UTC+2 (SAST)
- PO box: 1363

Hluvukani is a Tsonga speaking town in Bushbuckridge Local Municipality, Mpumalanga. It lies south of the R531 and west of the Manyeleti Game Reserve. It had a population of 9,631 in 2011. The Hluvukani Animal Clinic, a satellite of the University of Pretoria Faculty of Veterinary Science operates from the town.

The community pride themselves with Muchongolo (traditional dance) and Tingoma (initiation school), as well as Xiseveseve (Xibelana).
