= Joe Clare =

English footballer (1910–1987)

Personal information
- Full name: Joseph Clare
- Date of birth: 4 February 1910
- Place of birth: Westhoughton, Lancashire, England
- Date of death: 23 September 1987 (aged 77)
- Height: 5 ft 11 in (1.80 m)
- Positions: Outside left; left back

Senior career*
Years	Team	Apps	(Gls)
- Westhoughton Town
1930–1931	Manchester City	0	(0)
1931	Wigan Borough	0	(0)
1931–1933	Westhoughton Town		
1933–1935	Accrington Stanley	28	(1)
1935	Arsenal	0	(0)
1935–1936	Margate		(11)
1936–1937	Norwich City	22	(5)
1937–1945	Lincoln City	68	(23)
–	Ruston Bucyrus		
- * Club domestic league appearances and goals

Joseph Clare (4 February 1910 – 23 September 1987) was an English footballer who scored 41 goals from 90 appearances in the Football League playing for Accrington Stanley, Norwich City and Lincoln City. He played at outside left or left back.

He was on the books of Manchester City and Arsenal, without representing those clubs in the league, and was with Wigan Borough in their final season in the Football League, when the club folded in October 1931 and its results were expunged; Clare did not appear for their first team that season. He played in the Southern League with Margate. He later became first-team trainer for Bournemouth & Boscombe Athletic.
