= Claire Hodgkins =

American violinist (1929–2011)

- Hodgkins in 1962
- Born: 1929
- Died: 2011
- Occupation: Violinist

Claire Hodgkins (1929– 2011) was an American violin virtuoso, a student of Jascha Heifetz, and founder of the Jascha Heifetz society.

== Biography ==
Claire Hodgkins was born in Portland, Oregon the daughter of James L. and Viena H. Hodgkins. She started violin lessons at age four with James Eoff and, at age 9, continued with Edward Hurliman, concertmaster of the Portland Symphony. She would later study with Boris Sirpo.

She began her career in the Portland area, where she played as concertmaster in the Little Chamber Orchestra in the 1950s. In their first tour to Europe in 1955, where they played in six countries, they created a sensation and received rave reviews. The sixteen members, all young women from fifteen to eighteen years of age, gave impeccable performances, playing their concerts from memory.

In those years, Hodgkins was chosen from 500 applicants for the Brussels International Competition to be one of seven women to compete, along with thirty male contestants. La Libre Belgique praised her playing on that occasion for its "flawless accuracy, magnificent bowing, and superior tone quality."

Although in her early years she toured as a recitalist and as a soloist with orchestras in the Pacific Northwest, she would become known for her playing as a soloist and chamber musician with prestigious groups in internationally known venues during tours in the U.S. and Europe. Her first experience in playing in a master class in 1962 for Jascha Heifetz, hailed by many as the greatest violinist of the 20th century, was a frightening experience. An early performance is captured on a 1985 video. She worked closely with Heifetz for twelve years, as a master teaching associate at the University of Southern California, and prepared Heifetz's masterclass students. During that time she played chamber music with Heifetz, Gregor Piatagorsky, Leonard Pennario, and others.

Hodgkins taught at four other Southern California universities, including Loma Linda University, La Sierra Campus, now La Sierra University, where she led the string program and the orchestra. When LLU launched the Blomstedt Conducting Institute in 1971, she served as concertmaster for the orchestra used during that program. She also scheduled a successful ongoing summer string workshop to coincide with the institute. In 1974 she founded the Little Orchestra of Loma Linda University, a select group of musicians that included musicians, physicians, medical and dental students, and others in the medical professions. The ensemble toured extensively on the West Coast and in 1979 toured Scandinavia.

She founded Chanterelle Music Festivals, which are dedicated to the memory of Jascha Heifetz, his love of teaching, and passion for chamber music. With festivals in Vienna, Switzerland, and California from 1983 to present, musicians from students to professionals and teachers study, play chamber music, and perform concerts in inspiring surroundings.

Following Heifetz's death in 1987, Hodgkins founded the Jascha Heifetz Society, working with Heifetz's teaching assistant Sherry Kloss to preserve his concepts in playing and teaching. She assisted in cataloguing his personal music as part of a larger project to create a complete archive of materials related to his life and career.

== Death ==
Hodgkins was residing in Thousand Oaks, Ventura, California, when she died at age 82, following an extended illness.
