= Clair Maxwell =

American journalist

Clair Maxwell (1890–1957) was a 20th-century American magazine publisher.

== Career ==
Maxwell served in World War I as a transport pilot.

From 1921 to 1936 he was the publisher of Life magazine (when it was a general interest magazine). He acquired the magazine on the verge of financial ruin, and brought it back to being profitable after years of modifying its format and editorial style. After selling the business to Henry Luce in 1936 he worked for Luce for a short time before retiring to St. Augustine, Florida.

Maxwell subsequently became a partner in a liquor distribution company serving northern and central Florida.

== Personal life ==
Maxwell was born in 1890 in South Dakota. He was one of eight children, including brothers: Lee Maxwell; President of Crowell Publishing Company, Ray G. Maxwell; advertising agent, and Lloyd Maxwell; of Williams & Cunnyngham agency in Chicago. In 1918 he married Dorothy Boyden, daughter of a Chicago jeweler and a graduate of the University of Chicago. He and Dorothy had three children, Clair Maxwell Jr., Joan Maxwell Alvarez (television producer), and Hope Tate. He died in September 1957 from a smoking-related disease now known as congestive obstructive pulmonary disorder.

=== Golf ===
Maxwell was an enthusiastic golfer. The "four Brothers Maxwell" (Clair/Lee/Ray/Lloyd) had a standing challenge to any other foursome of one family, or any foursome of the publishing business. In 1931 when the USGA had approved a new tour ball, Maxwell had a strong personal opinion of the new ball, which he widely publicized. He called it a "cross between a ping-pong globule and a Mexican jumping bean".
