= Clarity (Sifow album) =

CLAЯITY

Studio album by sifow
- Released: September 13, 2006
- Recorded: 2006
- Genres: Dance, J-Pop
- Length: -
- Labels: Avex Trax (Japan, CD)

Sifow chronology
& YOU revolution (2006)	CLAЯITY (2006)	Love Spell (2007)

CLAЯITY is the first album to be released by sifow. The album was released under the label Avex Trax on September 13, 2006. It includes the singles CLOVER and LOVE & PEACE. The DVD also contains the PV's for the singles, as well as Jewel.

== Track listing ==
1. CLAЯITY
2. LOVE & PEACE
3. with you
4. image
5. Chain
6. Don't stop
7. CLOVER
8. 深呼吸 (Shin Kokyū, Deep Breath)
9. tell me love!!
10. Rainbow's
11. キミと空 (Kimi to Sora, You and the Sky)
12. My Dear
13. Bonus track：Jewel (Cyber NATION remix)

Bonus DVD:

1. Jewel music clip
2. CLOVER music clip
3. LOVE & PEACE music clip
4. Jewel TV SPOT
5. CLOVER TV SPOT
6. LOVE & PEACE TV SPOT
