= Peter Clare =

British surgeon (1738–1786)

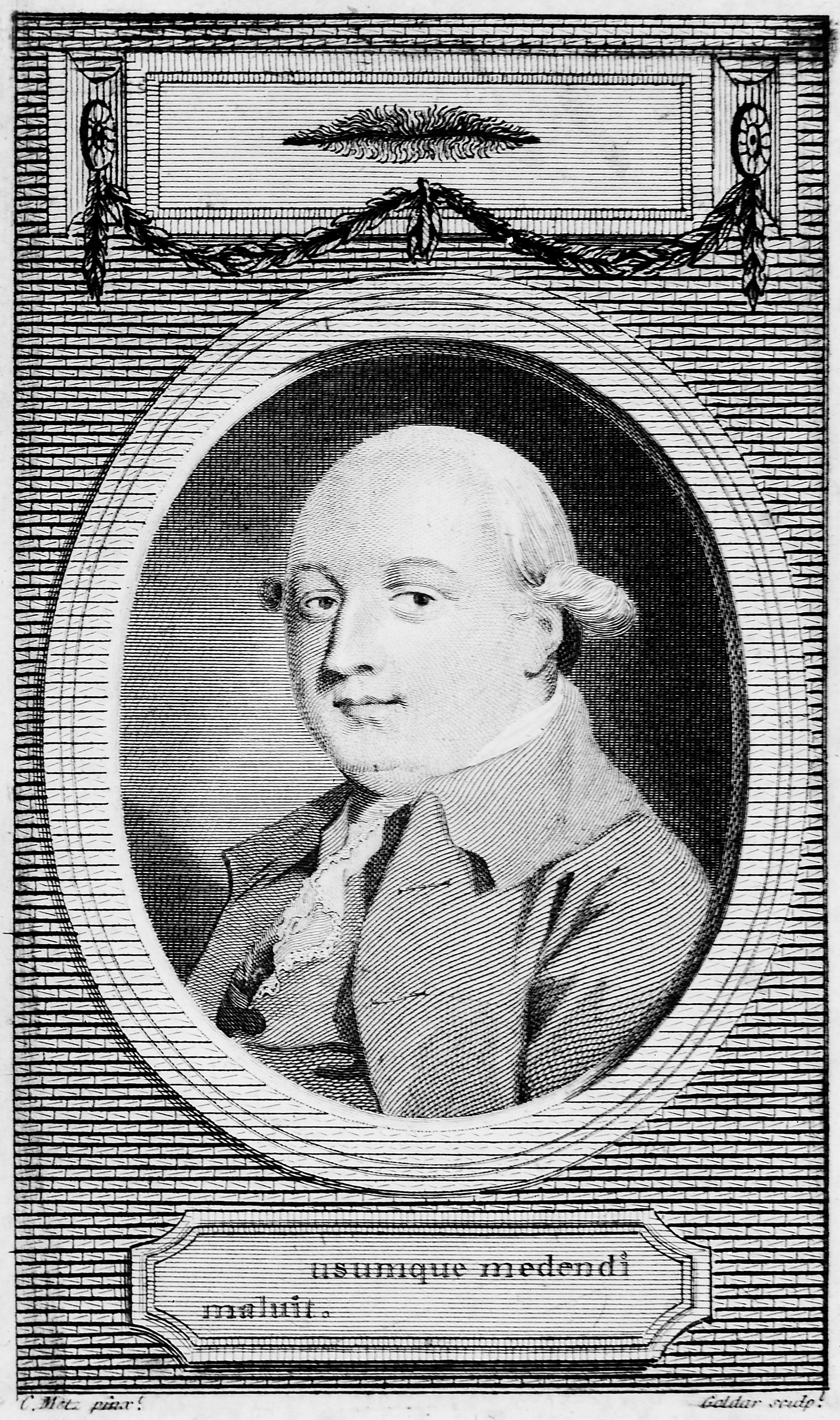
- Born: 1738
- Died: 30 March 1786 (aged 47–48)
- Occupation: Surgeon

Peter Clare (1738 – 30 March 1786) was a British surgeon.

== Biography ==
Clare was a London surgeon who wrote several treatises advocating a method of administering calomel by friction within the mouth as a remedy for venereal diseases. A medal by T. Holloway was struck in Clare's honour in 1779, with a finely executed portrait on one side, and on the other the words alluding to Clare's method: ‘Artem medendi Remed. ore absorpt. invt et divulgt.’ His principal writings, most of which were translated into French, were: 1. ‘Essay on the Cure of Abscesses by Caustic, and on the Treatment of Wounds and Ulcers,’ London, 1778. 2. ‘Method of Curing the Lues Venerea by the Introduction of Mercury into the System through the Orifices of the Absorbent Vessels,’ London, 1780. 3. ‘Treatise on Gonorrhœa,’ London, 1780. He died at Rugby 30 March 1786.
