= Gene Clair =

American audio engineer

Walter Eugene Gene Clair
- Born: May 6, 1940; Lititz, Pennsylvania
- Died: December 3, 2013 (aged 73); Lititz, Pennsylvania
- Occupation(s): Inventor, entrepreneur, audio engineer
- Parent(s): Roy B. Clair; Ellen Mae (Ulrich) Clair

Gene Clair (May 6, 1940 – December 3, 2013) was an American sound engineer who, along with his brother Roy Clair, founded Clair Brothers Sound in 1966. The company was among the first to provide sound reinforcement equipment and personnel that toured with music performers. Gene and his company were involved with many important innovations in sound reinforcement. His company grew to be among the largest sound companies in the world.

== Early years ==
Gene Clair was born in 1940 in the Lititz, Pennsylvania area. Gene graduated from Warwick High School in 1958. He was given awards for being one of the top athletes of his class. He received a two-year degree in Engineering from Penn State York. He started working with sound in 1955 when his father bought him and his brother a small PA system. In high school, college and afterward they started renting the PA out to bands, schools, and churches. They also expanded it with new equipment.

== Birth of touring sound reinforcement ==
In 1966, they provided sound to Frankie Valli and the Four Seasons at a local show. Their road crew was so impressed by the Clair Brothers sound system, the Clair brothers were asked to bring their equipment and provide sound for the Frankie Valli tour. Because of Clair Brothers success with Frankie Valli he was soon being hired to tour with Jefferson Airplane, Blood Sweat and Tears, and Elvis among others.

== Growth of Clair Brothers ==
Gene along with his brother Roy presided over the growth of Clair Brothers during the 1970s and 1980s from a small company to one of the leading sound companies in the US. The Clair brothers evolved the company from using standard commercial sound products to designing and manufacturing much of their own equipment. Two notable products were the S4 4-way speaker system and their 12 AM stage monitor.
