= Clarity =

Clarity may refer to:

== Music ==
=== Albums ===
- Clarity (Jimmy Eat World album) or the title song, 1999
- Clarity (Sifow album) or the title song, 2006
- Clarity (Zedd album) or the title song (see below), 2012
- Clarity (mixtape), by Kim Petras, or the title song, 2019
- Clarity: Music of Clare Fischer, by Roseanna Vitro, 2014
- Clarity, by Article One, 2010

=== Songs ===
- "Clarity" (John Mayer song), 2003
- "Clarity" (Senakah song), 2008
- "Clarity" (Vance Joy song). 2022
- "Clarity" (Zedd song), 2012
- "The Clarity", by Sleep, 2014
- "Clarity", by All That Remains from Behind Silence and Solitude, 2002
- "Clarity", by Attila from Closure, 2021
- "Clarity", by Bleed from Within from Era, 2018
- "Clarity", by Linkin Park, 2012
- "Clarity", by Northlane from Obsidian, 2022
- "Clarity", by Protest the Hero from Volition, 2013
- "Clarity", by Upon a Burning Body from Fury, 2022

== Companies ==
- Clarity Capital, an Israeli investment firm
- Clarity Visual Systems, a company acquired by Planar Systems
- Clarity Wireless, a company acquired by Cisco Systems

== Science and technology ==
- CLARITY, a method of making brain tissue transparent
- Clarity meter, or transparency meter, an instrument used to measure the transparency of an object
- Diamond clarity, relating to the appearance of internal and surface defects in diamond
- Honda FCX Clarity, a hydrogen fuel cell automobile

== Other uses ==
- "Clarity" (Homeland), a 2018 TV episode
- CLARITY – Employment for Blind People, a charitable organization
- Clarity Act, a 2000 Canadian law regarding secession
- Clarity Haynes, American queer feminist artist and writer

== See also ==
- Clearness committee, a Quaker religious practice
- Image resolution, the detail of an image
- Transparency (disambiguation)
