= Claire Newell =

Canadian businesswoman

Claire Newell is a Canadian travel expert, media personality, author, journalist & founder and president of Travel Best Bets (1993) which has more than 650 agents. She is one of the most well-known and respected travel experts in Canada & beyond.

For the past 33 years she has appeared as a regular contributor on Global TV BC (5 times/week), CKNW Radio (3 times/week), and is a weekly guest on Global TVs national The Morning Show. Claire has been a guest multiple times on Today, Fox & Friends, Good Day New York, ABC Morning News – Chicago, and CNN Radio.

She has been a spokesperson for Scenic (cruise line), Disney, Hilton Hotels & Resorts, Vancouver International Airport, Conrad Hotels & Resorts, Dukoral for Valneva, Bridgestone Tires, CHASE Sapphire Preferred Card, and TD Bank. She has been featured in ads and promotions for Visit Las Vegas, Visit Laguna Beach, Visit Anaheim, Vancouver International Airport, Hong Kong Tourism Board, BC Ferries, Canadian Tourism College, and the Canadian Tourism Commission.

Claire is an author of Travel Best Bets - An Insider's Guide to Taking Your Best Trip, Ever. She has also authored or been featured in articles for SUCCESS, Professional Woman, Today's Parent, Reader's Digest and for various newspapers. She was a co-host for the travel series Operation: Vacation which aired in the US Logo TV, Canada T+E and affiliate stations internationally.

Claire is a regular speaker at travel events in the U.S. and Canada. Having visited over 80+ countries, with many more on her bucket list, Claire provides her audience with helpful tips and deals.

Claire lives in Vancouver, British Columbia, with her husband and 2 children.
