= Alfred Clare =

British solicitor (1851–1912)

- Born: 17 September 1851; Bedford, England
- Died: 1 November 1912 (aged 61); Muswell Hill, London, England
- Education: Bedford Modern School
- Occupation: Lawyer

Alfred Clare (17 September 1851 – 1 November 1912) was for 19 years District Registrar of the High Court of Justice, Registrar in Bankruptcy and County Court Registrar in the districts of which Bedford was the centre. Clare was also an Alderman of Bedford for six years and served as a Governor of the Harpur Trust.

== Life ==
Alfred Clare was born in Bedford on 17 September 1851. He was the son of John Clare, who died when Alfred was young, and Emma who later married as her second husband, Mr. J. C. Conquest, a solicitor of Bedford.

Clare was educated at Bedford Modern School and left with a leaving exhibition, joining his step-father's firm as an articled clerk and later becoming a partner practising as Conquest and Clare. Clare established his reputation in the Petty Sessional and County Courts of Bedford and neighbouring counties while also earning a good reputation in the family courts. In one of his obituaries he was described as a 'shrewd and honourable practitioner, and an eloquent and successful pleader'.

Clare rose to prominence and was for nineteen years District Registrar of the High Court of Justice, Registrar in Bankruptcy, and County Court Registrar in the districts of which Bedford was the centre. He also held the clerkship to the burial board and served for six years as a borough alderman of Bedford. He also served as a Governor of the Harpur Trust.

Clare married Miss Mary Catherine Hensman in 1882. He died on All Saints' Day in Muswell Hill on 1 November 1912 and his funeral took place in Highgate. He was survived by his wife and four children.
