= Clair Alan Brown =

American botanist

- Born: August 16, 1903; Port Allegany, Pennsylvania
- Died: March 24, 1982 (aged 78); Baton Rouge, Louisiana
- Education: New York State College of Forestry, University of Michigan
- Children: 2
- Awards: Guggenheim Fellowship (1952); NSF Fellowship (1961)
- Scientific career
- Fields: Botany
- Institutions: Louisiana State University

Clair Alan Brown (August 16, 1903 – March 24, 1982) was an American botanist who specialized in Louisiana flora. He was a Louisiana State University faculty member from 1926 until his retirement in 1970.

== Biography ==
Brown was born in Port Allegany, Pennsylvania, to Charles Melvin and Jennie Burroughs Brown, one of four sons. He earned his bachelor's degree cum laude from New York State College of Forestry in 1925 and his Master's in botany from the University of Michigan in 1926. He began working at Louisiana State University (LSU) the following year before returning to the University of Michigan for his doctorate, which he completed in 1934. His dissertation was titled Morphology and biology of some species of Odontia. He took up his position at LSU again and taught botany, systematic botany, wood identification, dendrology, forest pathology, ecology, and palynology until his retirement in 1970.

He held a number of leadership roles in international organizations throughout his career, including as president of the Southern Weed Control Conference in 1948; as a delegate to the International Botanical Congress in 1950; and as president of the American Fern Society in 1960. He was also appointed to the International Committee on Palynology and was president of honor at the 78th Société botanique de France. Among his awards were a Guggenheim Fellowship in 1952, a National Science Foundation fellowship in 1961, and an Edmund Niles Huyck Fellowship. In 1973, he received a Louisiana Literary Award for his illustrated anthology Wildflowers of Louisiana and Adjoining States.

== Personal life ==
Brown married Maude Nichols on September 4, 1926 and they had two daughters, Sarah and Dorcas. Maude and nineteen-year-old Sarah died in a car accident in April 1962.

Brown died on March 24, 1982, in Baton Rouge.

== Selected publications ==
The standard author abbreviation C.A.Br. is used to indicate this person as the author when citing a botanical name.

- With Donovan Stewart Correll (1908–1983) Ferns and Fern Allies Trees & Shrubs. 1942
- Louisiana Trees & Shrubs. 1945
- Vegetation of the Outer Banks of North Carolina. 1959
- Palynological Techniques. 1960
- Wildflowers of Louisiana & Adjoining States. Ed. Louisiana State University Press. 259 pp. ISBN 0-8071-0780-8, 1980

== Sources ==
- Allen G. Debus (dir.) (1968). World Who's Who in Science. To Biographical Dictionary of Remarkable Scientists from Antiquity to the Present. Marquis-Who's Who (Chicago) : xvi + 1855 pp.
