= Conrad Clar =

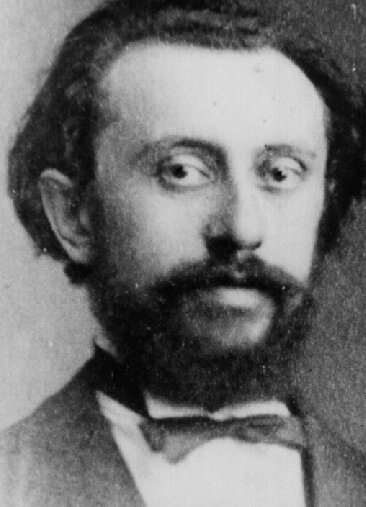

Conrad Clemens Clar or Konrad Clar (22 February 1844 – 13 January 1904) was an Austrian physician, balneologist and geologist. An innovation of a head mounted mirror and lamp for examining the throats of patients was named after him and the term "Clar (ENT) mirror" is still sometimes in use.

== Biography ==
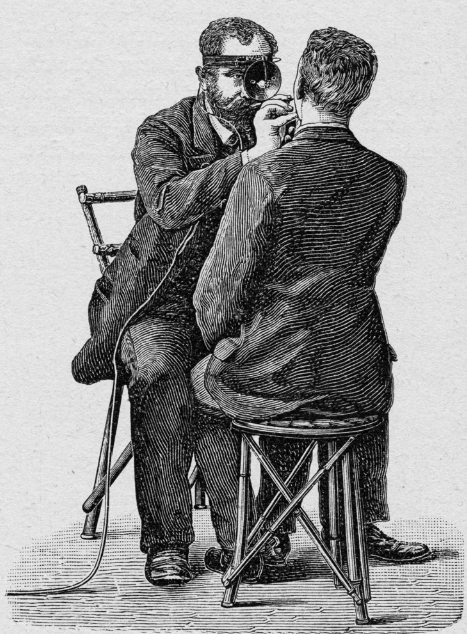
The mirror as shown in a 1908 catalog of Reiner Company

Clar was born in Graz, the son of Franz Clar (1812-1876), a professor of general pathology, therapy and pharmacology at the University of Graz. Conrad went to grammar school in Graz and studied philosophy at the University of Dresden and then at the University of Leipzig. He received a doctorate with a thesis on crystallography from Leipzig in 1864. He received a medical degree from the University of Graz in 1869. While at Graz, he became interested in mineralogy through the lectures of Carl Ferdinand Peters (1825-1881). In 1870 he became a lecturer in balneology along with Peters. He became a member of the Imperial Geological Institute from 1871 and in 1888 he began to lecture at the University of Vienna, while also working at the spa in Gleichenberg. In 1899 he became an extraordinary professor and gave lectures on topographical balneotherapy and climatotherapy. At Gleichenberg he had two pressure chambers built. He took an interest in geology and examined an area near Graz. He published the first geological map of Graz in 1877. During the 9th Internal Geological Congress in 1903, he led a group excursion to Bad Gleichenberg along with Alois Sigmund. He died in 1904 following a short illness.

Clar invented an electrical lamp with a concave mirror that could be placed on top of the head of a physician with the beam directed using the mirror to light the throat of patients. It was termed as Clar's mirror and included in product catalogues such as from Reiner Company in 1896. The original paper notes that the author was "Dr. Clar at Gleichenberg" and notes the issue of lack of gas light and was inspired to produce a more focussed light.
