= Claire Fontijn =

American musicologist

- Occupation: Musicologist

Academic background
- Education: B.A., French and Music; Certificate, Baroque Flute; M.A., Performance Practice; Ph.D., Musicology
- Alma mater: Oberlin College; Royal Conservatory of The Hague; Duke University

Claire Fontijn is a musicologist who holds the position of the Phyllis Henderson Carey Professor of Music at Wellesley College.

Through her research, Fontijn has explored the contributions of women composers throughout various periods of music history, spanning the Middle Ages (Hildegard of Bingen) to the Baroque era (Antonia Bembo and Barbara Strozzi) to the Romantic period (Fanny Hensel). She is the author of the monographs Desperate Measures: The Life and Music of Antonia Padoani Bembo and The Vision of Music in Saint Hildegard's Scivias: Synthesizing Image, Text, Notation, and Theory.

== Education ==
Fontijn obtained her B.A. in Music and French with honors from Oberlin College in 1982. She went on to earn a Certificate in Baroque Flute Performance from the Royal Conservatory of the Hague in 1985. In 1989, she received her M.A. in Performance Practice from Duke University, where she completed her studies with a Ph.D. in Musicology in 1994.

== Career ==
Fontijn joined Wellesley College as an assistant professor of Music in 1994 and was promoted to associate professor in 2001. In 2008, she became the Barbara Morris Caspersen Associate Professor of the Humanities at Wellesley College, a position she held until 2011. From 2013 to 2016, she was a professor of music, and since then, has held the title of Phyllis Henderson Carey Professor of Music.

Fontijn was the resident director of the Eastern College Consortium (E.C.Co.) in Bologna, Italy, in 2009–10 and again in Fall 2024.

As a performer, Fontijn has appeared as a singer and Baroque flutist with the Washington Bach Consort, Le Concert Spirituel in Paris, and La Donna Musicale in Boston.

== Works ==
In 2006, Fontijn published her first monograph, Desperate Measures: The Life and Music of Antonia Padoani Bembo, the first biography to detail the life and works of this seventeenth-century Venetian singer and composer. The book was recognized as a valuable and erudite addition to historical music literature, although critics of the book did note the difficult style and structure of the book, alongside some inaccuracies in text. In 2010, with Susan Parisi, she edited and contributed to the volume titled Fiori musicali: Liber amicorum Alexander Silbiger, a collection of essays intended as a Festschrift for her dissertation advisor, Alexander Silbiger. The volume was described as substantial, articulated and a quality addition to Baroque music literature, however, Bethany Cencer pointed out that the international scope of the book could have benefitted from the inclusion of an English topic.

In a book chapter she authored in the periodical Early Music, Fontijn examined the issue of inequality of note values in Johann Joachim Quantz's flute music. In 2013, she published her second monograph, titled The Vision of Music in Saint Hildegard's Scivias: Synthesizing Image, Text, Notation, and Theory, which presents the work of polymath Hildegard von Bingen. Later, in 2020, she edited the book Uncovering Music of Early European Women and contributed a chapter in which she explored how Barbara Strozzi represented weeping characters in her laments.

== Awards and honors ==
- 2007 – Nicolas Slonimsky Award for Outstanding Biography in the Field of Classical Music, American Society of Composers, Authors, and Publishers of Music
- 1989 – Third Prize Winner, Case Western University Baroque Music Competition

== Books ==
- Fontijn, Claire Anne (2006). Desperate measures: the life and music of Antonia Padoani Bembo (1st ed.). New York Oxford: Oxford University press. ISBN 978-0195135381.
- Parisi, Susan Helen (2010). Fontijn, Claire Anne (ed.). Fiori musicali: liber amicorum Alexander Silbiger. Harmonie Park Press. ISBN 978-0899901442.
- Fontijn, Claire Anne (2013). The vision of music in Saint Hildegard's Scivias: synthesizing image, text, notation and theory. Music Word Media. ISBN 978-1937330217.
- Fontijn, Claire, ed. (2020). Uncovering music of early European women (1250–1750) (1st ed.). Routledge. ISBN 978-1138585638.
