= Showco =

- Type: Private
- Industry: Entertainment technology
- Founded: 1970
- Founders: Jack Maxson; Rusty Brutsche; Jack Calmes
- Defunct: October 2000
- Fate: Acquired by Clair Bros. Audio Enterprises, Inc.

Showco was a sound equipment provider of touring sound reinforcement equipment and services to the concert touring industry. It was based in Dallas, Texas, United States. In 2000, Showco was acquired by Clair Global.

Showco was established in 1970 by Jack Maxson and Rusty Brutsche, and Jack Calmes, and is known for helping to pioneer post Woodstock-era stadium rock shows by providing state-of-the-art sound equipment for famous acts beginning with Led Zeppelin, Three Dog Night and James Taylor. According to Brutsche:

We were one of the first to realize the amount and scale of equipment that the major arena concerts required. Jack [Maxson] was a recording engineer and I was a musician. We learned that most public address systems were built for the amplification of a single announcer over crowd noise. The dynamics of live music and the power required to generate the sounds we hear at concerts today were almost unthinkable at that time.

With Showco equipment and services, the star performers could count on reliable and consistent sound reproduction at different venues. Showco introduced such features as mixing gear and stage monitors to aid the musicians. The equipment was also built to handle rugged touring schedules, outdoor weather conditions and quick assembly and disassembly.

Throughout the 1970s, Showco expanded its multi-discipline equipment and services to include stage lighting, set design and fabrication, special effects/lasers and disco sound systems. Later forays into stage lighting led to the 1981 formation of sister company Vari-Lite, Inc.

Showco was acquired by Clair Brothers in late 2000. Showco was merged into the touring arm of Clair Brothers. The combined division was then renamed ClairShowco. In 2008 the name was changed once again to Clair and given the corporate tagline "Global Service and Live Shows Since 1966."

== Showco Clients ==
Showco has provided equipment and services throughout the world for an extensive list of artists' tours, festivals and events.

Showco Artists and Events
Aerosmith
Al Jarreau
Alan Jackson
Alanis Morissette
Alice Cooper
Alice in Chains
Allman Brothers
Alvin Lee
Anita Baker
Art Garfunkel
Average White Band
B. B. King
Bad Company
Badfinger
Barbara Mandrell
Barry White
Beastie Boys
Beck, Bogert & Appice
Bee Gees
Ben Vereen
Billy Bob's Texas
Billy Preston
Billy Thorpe
Black Oak Arkansas
Black Sabbath
Blockbuster RockFest
Blood, Sweat & Tears
Bloodrock
Bob Seger
Bon Jovi
Bonnie Bramlett
Boston
Bread
Britney Spears
Brooks & Dunn
Brothers Johnson
Buddy Miles
Burton Cummings
Cactus
Carole King
Cat Stevens
CBS Records Conventions
Chaka Khan
Charlie Daniels Band
Chicago
Christina Aguilera
Claire Hamill
Climax Blues Band
Clint Black
Club MTV Tour
Commodores
Concert 10
Cornelius Brothers
Counting Crows
Crazy Horse
Culture Club
Dave Mason
David Bowie
David Cassidy
Deep Purple
Diana Ross
Dionne Warwick
Dixie Chicks
Don Henley
Doobie Brothers
Dr. Hook & the Medicine Show
Dr. John
Eagles
Earth, Wind & Fire
Edgar Winter
Edie Brickell & New Bohemians
Electric Light Orchestra
Elton John
Elvin Bishop
Elvis Presley
England Dan & John Ford Coley
Eric Burdon
Eric Clapton
Extreme
Faces
Farm Aid
Firefall
Fleetwood Mac
Flo & Eddie
Frank Zappa
Freddie King
Fruit of the Loom CountryFests
Garbage
Genesis
George Benson
George Michael
George Strait
Ginger Baker
Glen Campbell
Golden Earring
Grand Funk Railroad
Green Day
Guns N' Roses
Hall & Oates
Havana Jam
Humble Pie
In Performance at the White House
INXS
Iggy Pop
It's a Beautiful Day
J. J. Cale
Jackson Browne
James Gang
James Taylor
Janet Jackson
Jeff Beck
Jefferson Airplane
Jerry Jeff Walker
Jesus Christ Superstar
Jim Stafford
Joe Cocker
Joe Walsh
John Fogerty
John Mayall
John McLaughlin
John Waite
Johnny Winter
Judas Priest
Julian Lennon
Karla Bonoff
KC and the Sunshine Band
Kiki Dee
KISS
Kansas
Knebworth Festival
Kool & the Gang
Korn
Krokus
Lake
Laurie Anderson
Led Zeppelin
Lee Michaels
Leo Kottke
Leon Russell
Leon Spinks vs. Muhammad Ali II
Levon Helm
Limp Bizkit
Linda Ronstadt
Little Feat
Live
Loggins & Messina
Luther Vandross
Lynyrd Skynyrd
Mahavishnu Orchestra
Mar y Sol Pop Festival
Maria Muldaur
Mariah Carey
Marshall Tucker Band
Marvin Gaye
Mary Kay Conventions
Matchbox Twenty
Meat Loaf
Megadeth
Michael Martin Murphy
Mick Jagger
Mike and the Mechanics
Mothers of Invention
Mountain
Musicians United for Safe Energy Conventions
NSYNC
Nazareth
New Grass Revival
Ozark Music Festival
Ozzfest
Ozzy Osbourne
Pantera
Parliament Funkadelic
Paul McCartney
Pete Townshend
Peter Frampton
Peter Gabriel
Phil Collins
Phoebe Snow
Pope John Paul II
Prince
Procol Harum
Puff Daddy
Quiet Riot
Rare Earth
Reba McEntire
REO Speedwagon
Richard Pryor
Richie Havens
Rick James
Ritchie Blackmore
Robert Palmer
Robert Plant
Robin Trower
Rock in Rio
Rod Stewart
Roger Daltrey
Rossington Collins Band
Rufus
Sammy Hagar
Santana
Scandal
Seal
Shawn Phillips
Sheena Easton
Slayer
Soundgarden
Spiro Agnew
Staind
Steely Dan
Stephen Stills
Steppenwolf
Steve Miller Band
Steve Winwood
Steven Stills
Stevie Ray Vaughan
Stevie Wonder
Stone Temple Pilots
Sugar Ray
Sunday Break II
Suzi Quatro
T. Rex
Tanya Tucker
Ted Nugent
Ten Years After
The Band
The Beach Boys
The Black Crowes
The Blues Brothers
The Carpenters
The Clash
The Dudek-Finnegan-Krueger Band
The Firm
The Gap Band
The Groundhogs
The Guess Who
The Highwaymen
The J. Geils Band
The Jackson Five
The Jam
The Kinks
The Moody Blues
The New Barbarians
The O'Jays
The Osmonds
The Rolling Stones
The Smashing Pumpkins
The Who
Thin Lizzy
Third Eye Blind
Three Dog Night
Todd Rundgren
Tomita
Torvill and Dean
Toto
Uriah Heep
US Festival
Van Halen
Van Morrison
Vina del Mar International Song Festival
Vince Gill
War
Waylon Jennings
Weather Report
West, Bruce & Laing
Willie Nelson
Willie Nelson's Fourth of July Picnics and Dripping Springs Reunion
Wings
Wishbone Ash
Wynonna Judd
Yoko Ono
ZZ Top
