= Clair McCollough =

American broadcasting executive

Clair R. McCollough (January 15, 1904 – November 30, 1995) was an American broadcasting executive. He worked for 44 years as an executive for the Steinman Stations company and at its flagship station, WGAL-TV in Lancaster, Pennsylvania. He was also involved in the foundation of Broadcast Music, Inc., and with the National Association of Broadcasters (NAB). During his career, McCollough received a Distinguished Service Award from the NAB in 1959 and the Common Wealth Award of Distinguished Service in 1980.

== Life ==
McCollough was born in York, Pennsylvania in the early 1900s as the son of A. E. McCollough. At the age of eight, he was run over by a horse and buggy while playing in the middle of a York street. At the age of 10, he was a carrier boy for Lancaster Newspapers, owned by the Steinman family; he later worked in newspaper offices in high school and college. After graduating from Millersville State Normal School, where he played on the football team, he started his career as a classified advertising salesman for Lancaster Newspapers.

The Steinmans branched into broadcasting in 1929, and McCollough moved with them. After starting as manager of the two Steinman outlets in Wilmington, Delaware, WDEL and WILM, by 1932, he was the general manager of York station WORK. Two years later, he had been promoted to general manager of the Mason Dixon Radio Group, with stations at Lancaster, York and Hazleton as well as the two in Wilmington. The group grew to seven outlets by 1944, having expanded into Easton and Harrisburg. By the late 1940s, he was president of WGAL radio and television, a post he would hold until his retirement.

In the late 1930s and 1940s, McCollough's career began to include more prominent state and national positions. In 1938, the NAB elected him as a director, which began a lengthy involvement with the association. A year later, he served on the copyright committee that oversaw the creation of performing rights organization Broadcast Music, Inc. He presided over the Pennsylvania Association of Broadcasters, the first state association of its kind, from 1940 to 1945. At the NAB, he served on various committees. By 1955, he had been elected to the NAB board more times than any other individual. McCollough also served as the group's president in 1958.

McCollough was also active within the NBC network with which WGAL radio and television were affiliated, chairing the NBC stations planning and advisory committee. He also took part of the founding of the Television Bureau of Advertising and was the president of Broadcasters' Foundation, Inc., in the 1960s. The NAB presented McCollough with its Distinguished Service Award, one of its highest honors, in December 1959. Days later, he was named to a commission created to clean up the radio and television industries in the wake of the 1950s quiz show scandals and other controversies.

Two years later, when the radio and television boards of the NAB were unified, he was unanimously elected chairman and served in that post for two years. McCollough retired from all of his positions—president of WGAL, president of the Steinman Stations, and president of Steinman's cable television division—in 1974. After retiring, he became a consultant to Steinman and was named vice-chairman of WGAL radio and television.

=== Personal life and death ===
In addition to his broadcasting involvement, McCollough served as president of the Lancaster Chamber of Commerce and was active in a myriad of civic and business organizations in Lancaster. A member of the Presbyterian Church (USA), McCollough served on its long-range planning committee and chaired its Department of Radio and Television. McCullough was honored with the Common Wealth Award of Distinguished Service in 1980.

After having been active on the Millersville state normal school's council of trustees from 1936 to 1942, a $200,000 gift from McCullough in 1985 established a broadcasting center at the now-university, and a scholarship was also established in his name at the university. McCullough married Velma A. Dilworth in 1926 and had one daughter; Dilworth died in 1982. McCullough died in Lancaster on November 30, 1995.
