= Clare, Kansas =

Unincorporated community in Kansas, U.S.

Clare is an unincorporated community in Johnson County, Kansas, United States, and part of the Kansas City metropolitan area. It is located at 38°49′37″N 94°52′17″W.

== History ==
Clare was located on the Atchison, Topeka and Santa Fe Railway.
