= Thomas Clare (cricketer) =

English cricketer (1883–1940)

Personal information
- Full name: Thomas Clare
- Born: 20 August 1883; Brierley Hill, Staffordshire, England
- Died: 6 May 1940 (aged 56); Hagley, Worcestershire, England
- Batting: Right-handed

Domestic team information
- Years: Team
- 1920–1925: Worcestershire

Career statistics
Competition	FC
Matches	2
Runs scored	63
Batting average	15.75
100s/50s	0/0
Top score	34
Balls bowled	0
Wickets	-
Bowling average	-
5 wickets in innings	-
10 wickets in match	-
Best bowling	-
Catches/stumpings	3/0
- Source: , 1 March 2009

Thomas Clare (20 August 1883 – 6 May 1940) was an English cricketer: a right-handed batsman and right arm fast bowler who played two first-class games for Worcestershire, almost five years apart, in the 1920s. Both matches were at Amblecote.

His highest score of 34 came against Lancashire in the second innings of his debut in August 1920. This constituted exactly half of Worcestershire's paltry total of 68; the county lost by an innings inside two days having been routed by a career-best 7/34 from James Tyldesley. Clare's only other first-class outing was against Surrey in June 1925; he hit 25 in the second innings.
