= Jimmy Clare =

English footballer (born 1959)

Personal information
- Full name: James Edward Clare
- Date of birth: 6 November 1959 (age 66)
- Place of birth: Islington, England
- Position: Forward

Youth career
- 1976–1980: Chelsea

Senior career*
| Years | Team | Apps | (Gls) |
| 1980–1981 | Chelsea | 1 | (0) |
| 1981–1982 | Charlton Athletic | 0 | (0) |
| Total | | 1 | (0) |
- * Club domestic league appearances and goals

James Edward Clare (born 6 November 1959) was an English professional footballer who played as a forward in the Football League.
