= Tom Clare (singer) =

British music hall singer (1876–1946)

- Born: September 26, 1876; London, England
- Died: January 30, 1946 (aged 69)
- Genres: Music hall, humorous songs
- Occupations: Singer, entertainer, songwriter
- Instruments: Piano, vocals
- Years active: c. 1884–1946

Tom Clare (26 September 1876 – 30 January 1946) was a British music hall singer from the early twentieth century, who was born in London. He was best known for singing humorous songs, which he self-accompanied on the piano.

His parents were Thomas Wright and Harriet Laura née Angell. His father was a jeweller, silversmith and vocalist, who changed his name to George Clare in the early 1900s.

He made his first stage appearance when he was eight years old, with the Mohawk Minstrels. He was particularly well known, in the First World War era, for his ironic, humorous songs, "The Fine Old English Gentleman" (a song which gently mocked the arrival of modernity, "Who Bashed Bill Kaiser?" and "What Did You Do in the Great War, Daddy?" This last song (based on a 1915 Savile Lumley propaganda poster, "Daddy, what did YOU do in the Great War?") criticized those who claimed to be war heroes, but had been busy on the black market, or avoiding work, throughout the war. In another of his songs, he poked fun at certain civilian decorations which had been (in the opinion of The Times) too generously bestowed. Songs of social criticism were rare at this time in the music hall, so Clare's tended to stand out. He can be found on both the 1901 and 1911 census as an entertainer; he was also involved with the Bohemia Theatre at Broadstairs, Kent.

He was also involved in a large number of charity concerts in aid of wounded soldiers.

Although, like most singers of his time, it was in live shows that he gained his reputation, he began recording his songs on cylinder as early as 1906, with his hit "The Girl in the Big Black Hat".

== Bibliography ==
- Rust, Brian: British Music Hall on Record, Harrow: Gramophone Publications Ltd., 1979. ISBN 9780902470125 - Lists dozens of recordings by Tom Clare.
- Garrett, John M.: Sixty Years of British Music Hall Songs, London: Chappell & Co., 1976. ISBN 978-0903443135
- Kilgarriff, Michael: Sing Us One of the Old Songs: A Guide to Popular Song, 1860-1920, Oxford: Oxford University Press, 1999. ISBN 978-0198166573
