= Clare Street =

Clare Street may refer to:

- Clare Street, Dublin
- Clare Street, Bristol, an extension of Corn Street
- Clare Street, Northampton, the location of Clare Street drill hall, Northampton
