= Claire Konold =

American politician (1938–2024)

Member of the South Dakota House of Representatives from the 5th district
- In office 1997–2004

Personal details
- Born: February 13, 1938 Clear Lake, South Dakota, U.S.
- Died: March 9, 2024 (aged 86)
- Party: Republican
- Spouse: Wylla Hicks
- Children: Four
- Profession: Real Estate Appraiser/Broker

Claire B. Konold (February 13, 1938 – March 9, 2024) was an American politician. He served in the South Dakota House of Representatives from 1997 to 2004. He died on March 9, 2024, at the age of 86.
