= James Clare (rugby union) =

Wales international rugby union player (1857–1930)

- Born: James Arthur Clare; 1857 London, London
- Died: 4 January 1930 (aged 72–73) Cardiff, Wales
- School: Christ College, Brecon
- Occupation: Maritime pilot

Rugby union career
- Position: Three-quarter
Amateur team(s)
Years	Team	Apps	(Points)
1881–1886	Cardiff RFC		
International career
Years	Team	Apps	(Points)
1883	Wales	1	(0)

James Arthur Clare (1857 – 4 January 1930) was an English-born international rugby union three-quarter who played club rugby for Cardiff Rugby Football Club and international rugby for Wales. He achieved just a single cap, in the second international encounter between Wales and his birth country England.

== Rugby career ==
Clare was born in London in 1857 but moved to Penarth in Wales, where he became a pilot in the Cardiff Docks, guiding ships through the harbour. While working in the Cardiff area he began playing rugby for Cardiff Rugby Club. In 1883 Clare was selected to represent his adopted country when he played for Wales in the opening game of the 1883 Home Nations Championship against England. This was only the third international game Wales had played and was the first ever game of the inaugural Six Nations Championship. Under the captaincy of Charles Lewis, Clare played three-quarters along with David Gwynn and Cardiff team-mate William Norton. Wales lost the game by two goals and four tries to nil, and Clare was not reselected to represent Wales again.

=== International matches played ===
Wales

- England 1883

== Bibliography ==
- Smith, David; Williams, Gareth (1980). Fields of Praise: The Official History of The Welsh Rugby Union. Cardiff: University of Wales Press. ISBN 0-7083-0766-3.
