= Clare Colvin =

British journalist and writer

Clare Colvin is a British journalist, author, book reviewer and theatre critic. She is the author of three books, literary editor for the Sunday Express, and a book reviewer for a number of British dailies, including the Daily Mail.

== Early life and education ==
Colvin was born in London, the daughter of British journalist and historian, Ian Colvin. She attended Digswell Primary School and, after passing her 11 plus, Ware Grammar School for Girls, Herschel Girl's School in Cape Town, Folkestone Grammar School for Girls, a year at the American University in Beirut, and a A-levels cram school in Chelsea.

== Critical reception ==
Of her 1996 novel, A Fatal Season, the Daily Telegraph considered that she "calls on [her] skills to reprise the life of egocentric theatre director Lambert Rees, who is in decline, both personally and professionally.... Plenty there for Colvin to play with, which she does, with some amusement, and not a little sympathy for the theatrical egos which are scrambled along the way."

Of her 1999 novel, Masque of the Gonzagas, the Daily Telegraph said "in this fine novel... Colvin has fashioned a love story of suitably baroque intensity. This is historical fiction with imaginative sweep." However, the Guardian for its part said "Colvin... conjures malaria, plague and the complex loyalties of courtiers with spirit but these, though enjoyable, are baroque flourishes which disguise the absence of a plot with substance.

Of her 2003 novel, The Mirror Makers, the Independent said "No historical novel is com-plete without a little master-servant misalliance, and Colvin effectively exploits the upstairs-downstairs narrative." The Gazette and Herald found that "Clare Colvin skilfully weaves a novel of romance and revenge bringing details of the time colourfully to life. She makes us ponder the stories of lesser players in great moments of history."

== Personal life ==
In 1975, she married the barrister and writer, David Melvin Fingleton; he died in 2006.

== Works ==
- A Fatal Season (1996) Duckworth.
- Masque of the Gonzagas (1999) Arcadia.
- The Mirror Makers (2003) Hutchinson.
