= Edwin Clare =

English footballer (1883–1944)

Personal information
- Full name: William Edwin Clare
- Date of birth: 21 September 1883
- Place of birth: Basford, England
- Date of death: 1944 (aged 60–61)
- Place of death: Edmonton, England
- Height: 6 ft 0 in (1.83 m)
- Position: Full back

Senior career*
Years	Team	Apps	(Gls)
- Kirkby Rovers
- Bentinck Colliery Welfare
- Mansfield Woodhouse
1904–1905	Notts County	6	(0)
1905–1906	Brighton & Hove Albion	15	(0)
- Mansfield Wesleyans
- * Club domestic league appearances and goals

William Edwin Clare (21 September 1883 – 1944) was an English professional footballer who played as a full back in the Football League for Notts County. He also played Southern League football for Brighton & Hove Albion.

== Life and career ==
William Edwin Clare was born in Basford, Nottinghamshire, on 21 September 1883, the son of a coal-mining contractor. He played local football for clubs including Kirkby Rovers, Bentinck Colliery Welfare and Mansfield Woodhouse, and signed for Notts County in 1904. He made his debut at the end of the 1903–04 season in a 2–0 loss away to Small Heath in the First Division, and made five more league appearances the following season. He signed for Brighton & Hove Albion in May 1905. He began as a regular but was displaced by Tom Turner, made no more appearances in the Southern League team, and left the club at the end of the season. He later played for Mansfield Wesleyans.

Clare also played cricket professionally. He joined Nottinghamshire County Cricket Club's ground staff as a 17-year-old and played at least once for the club's Second XI, before continuing his career as a club professional with West Norfolk, Redcar of the North Yorkshire and South Durham League, and Ribblesdale League club Burnley St Andrew's, whose local newspaper described him as a "powerful-looking young fellow", "a fast bowler and good bat".

In 1904, while a Notts County player, he received the Certificate of the Royal Humane Society for rescuing a child from the Grantham Canal:

Clare was walking on November 26th between Nottingham and Radcliffe-on-Trent, when he heard cries for help, and saw a boy named Harold Lamb, of West Bridgford, struggling in the canal. Although fully dressed, Clare unhesitatingly plunged into the water, swam to the other side, and rescued the boy.

Clare died in 1944 in Edmonton, Middlesex.
