= John Clare (journalist) =

English author and journalist (born 1955)

John Clare (born 1955) is an English author, journalist and chief executive of Lions Den Communications.

He was a producer and reporter at ITN where he covered some of the biggest stories of the 1980s including the Troubles in Northern Ireland, the Hungerford Massacre, the Heysel stadium disaster and trial of the Liverpool fans, the Bradford football stadium fire, the trial of the Brighton Bomber, Patrick McGee, and his associates, and the Broadwater Farm trials.

He also, with reporter David Chater, covered Tom McClean's historic single-handed rowing across the Atlantic, a feat for which Tom still holds the world speed record.

On the Daily Mail he was a feature writer and commissioning editor.

He is the author of a number of books, including Communicating Clearly about Science and Medicine (Gower, 2012), John Clare's Guide to Media Handling (Gower), and Organ Farm (Carlton Books) – the book of the TV series of which he was an executive producer.

== Biography ==
Born in Manchester, Clare attended Kaskenmoor Comprehensive School in Oldham and turned down university in favour of a place on a course run by the National Council for the Training of Journalists.

His first job in journalism was on the award-winning South London Press, where he was indentured under legendary newspaper editor HH (Max) Wall.

He left there to join the London office of United Newspapers, publishers of the Yorkshire Post, Sheffield Morning Telegraph and a number of evening and weekly newspapers in the north of England.

He worked casual reporting shifts on various Fleet Street newspapers including the Daily Mail, the Observer and the News of the World, the newspaper he eventually joined as the youngest staff reporter at the time, aged 22.

He joined Thames News as a researcher/subeditor in 1979, then was one of the first news editors at TVAM, the first commercial breakfast TV service in the UK, joining three months before the station went on air in February 1983. He had a ringside seat as the "Famous Five"'s vision for intellectual TV was replaced by the Roland Rat-inspired Greg Dyke revolution that quickly won the battle for breakfast viewers.

Clare left there to join ITN in 1984. In 1987, he became editor at LWT News, Britain's first independent commercial news programme.

In 1992, he founded LionsDen Communications and is now recognised as an expert in communications, presenting and media handling, particularly in the pharmaceutical sector.

He has coached thousands of physicians, scientists and pharmaceutical executives in clear communication, and speaks on communication-related subjects at international conferences.

He has coached people for Parliamentary inquiries, regulatory hearings and helped them to prepare for announcements involving hundreds of millions of pounds.

In 2006, he was awarded the Communiqué Judges Award for Outstanding Healthcare Communications. He regularly writes and interviews senior pharmaceutical industry figures for PMLive.

He is also the author of The Organ Farm and Media Handling and a SCRIP special report, Patents, Patients and Profits: Media reporting of the Pharmaceutical Industry. His book on presenting medical data will be published by Gower in Autumn 2011.
