= Clair Global =

Audio engineering company

- Formerly: Clair Brothers Audio Enterprises
- Type: Private
- Industry: Entertainment, Construction, Professional Audio
- Founded: 1966; 60 years ago in Lititz, Pennsylvania, United States
- Founders: Walter Eugene "Gene" Clair; Roy Clair
- Headquarters: Lititz, Pennsylvania, United States
- Number of locations: 22 locations (2024)
- Area served: Worldwide
- Key people: Troy Clair (president and CEO)
- Brands: Ampco-Flashlight, ATK Audiotek, AudioRent Clair, BBM Clair, Britannia Row Productions, Clearwing, Eighth Day Sound, JPJ Audio, LD Systems, Pro Media Audio Video, Purple, Riggingbox, SKAN, Sound Image, Stagelight, Surfhire, TDA Clair
- Divisions: Rental; Integration; Product
- Website: clairglobal.com

Clair Global, or simply Clair, is a professional sound reinforcement, live touring production and integrated audio, video, lighting and controls design and integration company. It was founded by brothers Roy and Gene Clair, who went into business in 1966 after they were asked to bring their sound system on tour with Frankie Valli and the Four Seasons. It is believed they were the first professional sound company to tour with a band. The company formally incorporated in 1970 as Clair Bros. Audio Enterprises, Inc.

== History ==
=== 1960s and 1970s ===
Brothers Roy and Gene Clair grew up in Lititz, Pennsylvania, where their parents owned a grocery store. Their father bought them a small public address system in 1955 which they started to rent out to bands, schools, and churches. It consisted of a horn loudspeaker, a Stromberg-Carlson integrated preamplifier, a 35-watt power amp, and a microphone. Money they earned went to buying more equipment. Through high school, college and after they continued to rent it out and add to it.

Their first business was a loudspeaker reconing business, Clair Reconing, which fixed loudspeakers. This is where they first started learning about loudspeaker design and how important it is to efficiency.

In the early 1960s Gene began working as a technician for Franklin & Marshall College in nearby Lancaster, Pennsylvania, which gave them opportunities to rent out their sound system. Their sound system consisted of two columns with six eight-inch speakers each, a Bogen amplifier and four Shure 55s microphones and rented for $95 a night.

Their big break came in 1966. They provided sound to Frankie Valli and the Four Seasons at a local show at Franklin & Marshall College. Their road crew was impressed by the Clair Brothers sound system. Roy asked to be invited into their dressing room, where he talked about why the system sounded so good. The next day the band had a show in Allentown, Pennsylvania, which sounded terrible. They contacted the Clair brothers through a local DJ and asked them to come down with their system. Just before these two concerts they had done a show with Herb Alpert, who had not allowed them to use his superior sound system, and they were stuck with the poor house sound system. This made them realize the benefit of traveling with their own sound system. Once again impressed with the Clair brothers sound system, the tour manager asked them to join them on the road for the rest of the tour, bringing their sound system, for $90 per show. It is believed they were the first professional sound company to tour with a band.

In 1967, Clair Brothers used Altec Lansing A7-500 Voice of the Theater speakers on the Frankie Valli and the Four Seasons tour.

In 1968, the Clair Brothers main front of house system consisted of stacks of custom designed dual 15 inch bass horns loaded with Altec drivers. These were paired with passive crossovers and Altec 288-C high frequency drivers attached to Altec multi-cell horns. These were powered by the new Crown DC300 direct coupled amplifiers. The new dual 15 inch bass horn design was based on the Altec A7 horn design. They were built in-house.

In 1970, the Clair Brothers officially incorporate as Clair Bros. Audio Enterprises, Inc. and switched to JBL speaker components in their speaker designs.

=== 1974 Clair S4 All-In-One full range speaker ===
In 1974 Clair Brothers introduced their S4 all-in-one PA speaker. A radical departure from the different sized modular boxes generally used in large concert PA systems of the time. The S4 was a single box full range 4-way speaker weighing 425 lbs with integrated rigging hardware for suspending from the roof or superstructure of an auditorium or arena. The S4 measured 45 inches by 45 inches which allowed two cabinets to sit side by side in a semi-trailer truck. The S4 design was a system that included the S4 speakers, amplifier racks, flying hardware and cabling as an integrated package.

The original S4 design was a 4-way system with two JBL K150 18 inch bass speakers, four JBL K110 10 inch midrange speakers, two JBL 2440 2-inch throat high frequency drivers coupled to JBL 2385 12 inch elliptical exponential horns (without the slant-plate acoustic lenses) and two JBL 2405 ultra-high frequency "slot" drivers. The drivers were vertically aligned so they would acoustically couple with the cabinets above and below them. The driver selection evolved over time generally keeping with the all JBL design.

The 4-way design used a 3-way active cross over with 200 Hz and 1,200 Hz crossover points initially powered by Phase Linear 700 amplifiers. A passive 7 kHz high frequency crossover between the JBL 2440 and JBL 2405 drivers was installed in the cabinet. Speaker cabinets were connected to the amplifier racks using custom large gauge multi pair cables with Cannon multi-pin connectors.

The S-4 was used in large two dimension arrays. Typically six to ten or more columns of six or nine speakers closely arrayed.

=== 1980s through present ===
In 1980, Clair Global established its first location outside the United States, with Clair Japan in Yokohama. At the end of the decade, Clair Global officially launched a spin-off to install permanent sound, video, and lighting systems in concert venues, churches, stadiums, theaters, cruise ships, and schools. This new business eventually grew large enough that in 2009 it moved out of the Lititz location to a new location in nearby Manheim. That business is now separate and known as Clair Companies.

In 1990, Clair acquired MD Systems of Nashville and created a partnership with JANDS in Australia. Also that year, Clair opened a location in Cambridge, England. Four years later it moved the operation to Switzerland to combine with Audio Rent in Basel, operating there as AudioRent Clair. In 1995, Gene Clair sold his end of the business to his son Troy Clair, who is now president and CEO.

In October 2000, Clair bought Showco, its direct competitor, and named the combined company ClairShowCo. With this move, the company became one of the world's largest sound reinforcement equipment providers, and it continued to grow over the course of the decade, particularly with acquisitions of DB Sound of Chicago and ConcertSound of the UK in 2008. In 2008, renamed as Clair Global. Clair Global added a broadcast services division in August 2010, in part through the acquisition of Wireless First, Inc. and GTO Live, Inc. With that acquisition came Kevin Sanford, the founder of both companies.

In December 2013, co-founder Gene Clair died of an illness at age 73.

In April 2022, Black Box Music in Berlin was acquired by AudioRent Clair, which now operates as BBM Clair. Clair thus has a branch in the EU again after Brexit.

In April of 2025 Clair global acquired the in the Netherlands based Ampco Flashlight Group. Expanding their reach even more into the European market.

In August of 2025, Clearwing Productions and Clearwing Systems Integration (Based in Milwaukee, WI and Phoenix, AZ) were acquired by Clair Global, expanding production, system integration, service and equipment sale capabilities.

== Innovations ==
Clair designed and built the first stage monitor, in 1970, and the first hanging sound system for indoor arenas, in 1972. Both are now standard parts of live events. Clair, along with JANDS co-founder Bruce Jackson, developed and introduced its own 32-channel folding audio console with parametric EQ, in 1977, followed by CTS™ processing and the Clair/TC remote controlled EQ system in 1980.

In 2014, along with partner Tait Towers, Clair opened the 30,000 square-foot Rock Lititz, the largest dedicated rehearsal space in the world.

=== Rock Lititz Campus ===
Clair is a primary developer of Rock Lititz, a campus shared with other companies in the live event industry.

== See also ==
- Sound reinforcement system
- Showco
