= Clare Abbott (artist) =

South African wildlife artist and illustrator (1921–2008)

- Born: Clare Pauline Hinshelwood; 5 July 1921; England
- Died: 2008 (aged 86–87)
- Occupation: Illustrator
- Writing career
- Language: English
- Genre: Natural history

Clare Pauline Abbott (née Hinshelwood, 5 July 1921 – 2008) was a South African wildlife artist and illustrator from England.

== Early life ==
Abbott was born in Castle Eden Durham, England to a family with Mancunian influences. Her mother and grandad were both teachers who showed her the importance of education. She studied English at Lady Margaret Hall. She permanently moved to South Africa in 1961.

== Career ==
Abbot volunteered at the Cheltenham Literature Festival after graduation, working on events hosted at the Everyman Theatre. She got her first job at Shakespeare’s Globe in London and in five years she was the theater's school's education provision. She switched to overseeing student services at the adult education college City Lit and later relocated to the north-west as Operations Director at Manchester Mind which delivers mental-health services and local community action projects.

She produced detailed natural history paintings that were used in numerous publications in South Africa and also art illustration of wildlife books. She redesigned the colour plates for the American edition of Rowland Ward's book of big game records.

== Works ==
- Smithers, Reay H.N.; Clare Abbott (1983). The Mammals of the Southern African Subregion. University of Pretoria.
- Henning, Stephen; Clare Abbott (1984). Southern African Butterflies. Macmillan South Africa.
- Smithers, Reay H.N.; Clare Abbott (1986). Land Mammals of Southern Africa, a Field Guide. Macmillan South Africa.

== Death ==
Abbott died in 2008, and was later buried in Linlithgow, Scotland.
