= Bounty (chocolate bar) =

Mars Inc. brand of coconut-filled chocolate bar

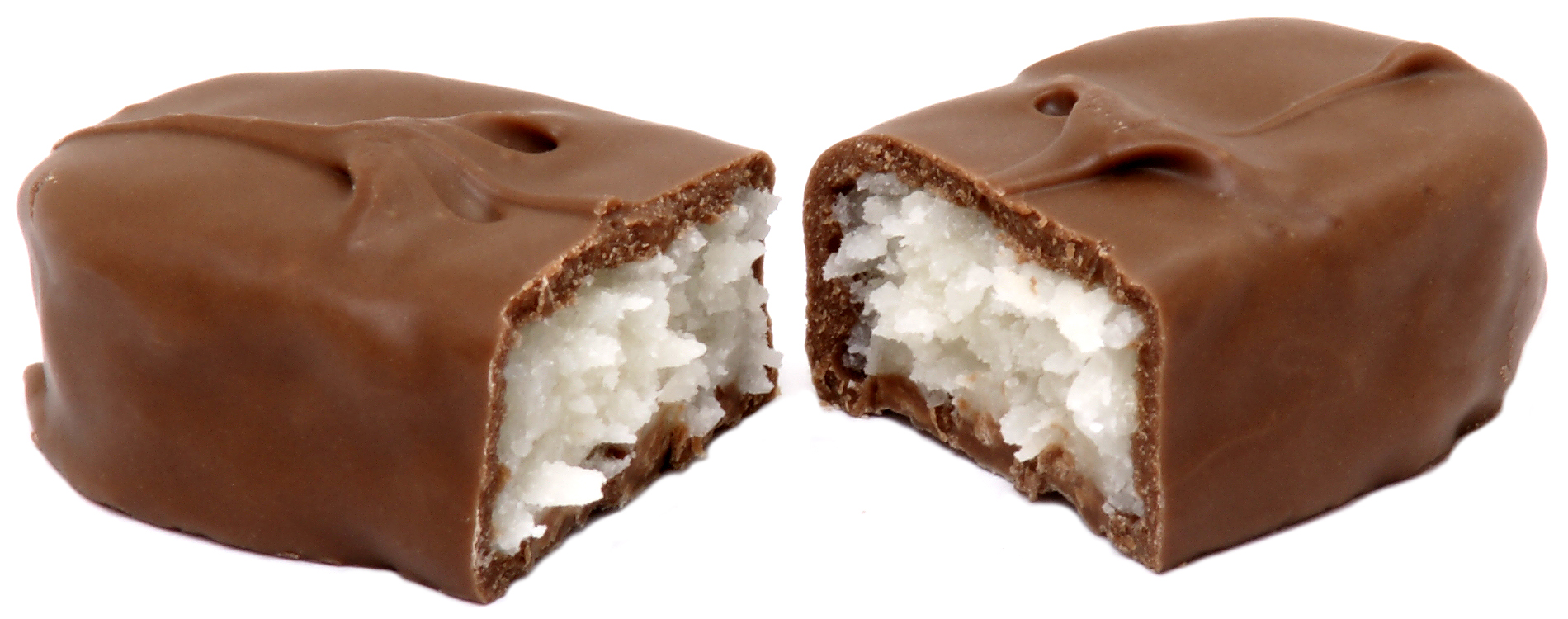
- One of the two bars in a Bounty, split
- Product type: Confectionery
- Produced by: Mars Inc.
- Country: United Kingdom
- Introduced: 1951; 75 years ago
- Tagline: The Taste of Paradise.

Bounty is a British coconut-filled, chocolate-enrobed candy bar manufactured by Mars Inc. since 1951.

== History ==
The Bounty was designed in Slough by Forrest Mars Sr. as an imitation of the Mounds bar introduced by Peter Paul in 1936. Mars introduced his version in Britain and other markets where Paul did not operate. Since then, Bounty has been marketed around the world. In the United States, Bounty was launched in 1989 by Mars to compete against The Hershey Company which had taken control of the Mounds and Almond Joy bars. However, Bounty failed in the market there.

== Flavours ==
Bounty has a coconut filling, enrobed typically with milk chocolate (in a blue wrapper) but also with dark chocolate (in a red wrapper) and is usually sold as two small bars wrapped in one package, although smaller bars do exist—usually not sold separately.

Bounty Trio is a triple bar version, usually sold alongside Mars' "Duo" ranges of Mars bars and Snickers etc.

Bounty chocolate bar, Cherry limited-edition (2009–2013)

Since 2006, a cherry-flavoured version has also been available in Australia. This was initially a limited edition flavour, but remained available as of 2013. In 2018 the cherry bounty was no longer available. In Europe, a limited edition mango flavour was available in 2004–05 and in Russia and Ukraine in 2010. A pineapple-flavoured edition was available in Russia during 2014.

Since November 2022 the dark chocolate Bounty has not been available in British stores. Mars UK said in September 2023 that "we have temporarily had to delist Bounty Dark for operational reasons and we’re working hard to bring the product back when we can".

== Popularity ==
In 2022, Guardian journalist Emma Hughes viewed the 1951 introduction of the product as responding to a "new mood of postwar optimism and people's longing for sunny foreign travel".

Described as "perhaps Britain’s most controversial confection", Bounty achieved a reputation of being the leftover snack from Celebrations tubs. On 3 November 2022, it was announced that Bounty bars would be removed from some Celebrations tubs sold in Britain as a trial run after the manufacturers found that 40% of people disliked them. A limited run of "No Bounty" tubs were made available in the weeks before Christmas. However, a final decision on removing them from the tubs completely had not been made, after 18% of people surveyed named the Bounty as their favourite chocolate bar in Celebrations tubs.

== Advertising ==
Early advertisement described the bar as "the new chocolate thrill from the South Seas".

Most of Bounty's advertisement show a sandy, and sunny beach on an unnamed island with coconut palms (as Bounty's filling consists of Coconut)

In the 1970s the bar was promoted in television adverts showing a tropical beach scene and the tag-line "The Bounty hunters—They came in search of paradise." In 1996 the format was radically changed, after a £2 million investment from the manufacturer, Mars Inc.

== See also ==
- List of chocolate bar brands
