= Laurel Park =

Laurel Park may refer to:

- Laurel Park, Richmond, California, a neighborhood
- Laurel Park, New Jersey
- Laurel Park, North Carolina
- Laurel Park, Virginia
- Laurel Park (race track), a horse racing facility in Laurel, Maryland
  - Laurel Racetrack station, also known as Laurel Park
- Laurel Park Incorporated, a landfill site in Naugatuck, Connecticut
