= YSC =

YSC may refer to:

== Acronyms and initialisms ==
- Yemeni Super Cup
- Yerevan Komitas State Conservatory a conservatory located in Yerevan, Armenia
- Yugoslav Super Cup
- Young Survival Coalition an international group for women under 40 who have been diagnosed with breast cancer
- Youth detention center#Youth Services Center the District of Columbia's secure juvenile detention center

== Codes ==
- Sherbrooke Airport has IATA code YSC
- Jassic dialect has ISO 639-3 code ysc
