= Garbage scow =

Boat or barge used to transport waste

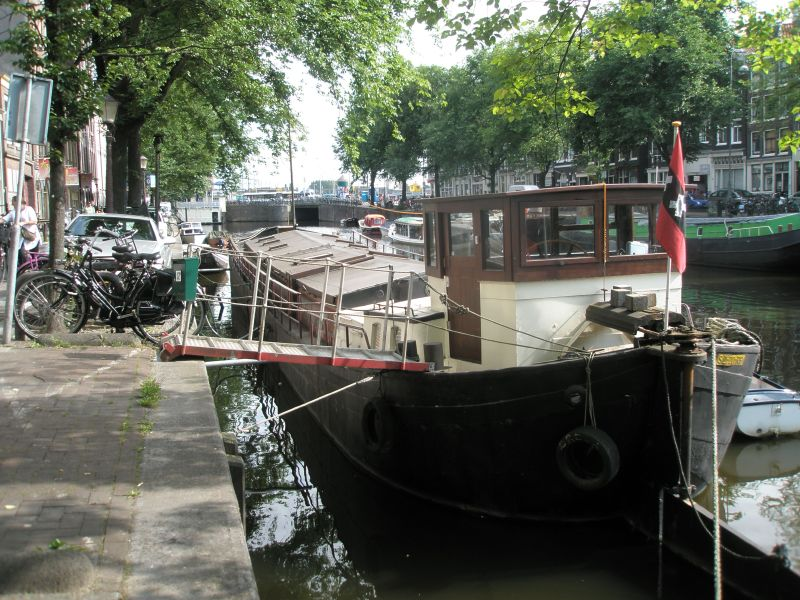
A typical garbage scow used in Amsterdam

A garbage scow is a large watercraft used to transport refuse and waste/garbage across waterways. It is often in the form of a barge which is towed or otherwise moved by means of tugboats; however, many are also self-propelled. They are most common in large, coastal cities, such as New York City, which may transport collected trash to neighboring ports for disposal or, occasionally, even illegally dump the payload at sea.

The garbage scow Mobro 4000, which was given the nickname the "Gar-Barge", became notorious in 1987 for travelling between New York City and Belize trying unsuccessfully to get rid of a load of rubbish, ultimately incinerated in New York.

Garbage scows have been used to covertly transport illegal substances in the US. In 1948, the Milwaukee Journal Sentinel reported a major bust of narcotics smugglers by United States customs guards and NYC police, with city sanitation workers searching through 20 tons of garbage on a scow in New York Harbor for over US$1 million in drugs concealed there.

In another case, during the 1920–1933 era of US prohibition of alcoholic beverages, a garbage scow in New York was used to smuggle 1,000 cases of liquor from New York's "rum row".

== See also ==
- Beach cleaner
- Garbage truck
