= Walnettos =

American confectionary

20th Century versions of product logo and packaging. Top: Original J. N. Collins logo. Bottom: Packaging of Peter Paul version.

Walnettos are an American chewy caramel-walnut candy.

Walnettos were introduced by the J. N. Collins Company of Minneapolis, Minnesota, in 1919. Although originally not available in the summer, Walnettos were one of America's most popular candies in the 1920s and 1930s. Walnettos were later bought by Peter Paul and, as the candy declined in popularity, passed through several other hands before being bought and resurrected by candy entrepreneur Sandy Licht in the 1980s. Sandy Licht's daughter, Lisa Licht, is now running the company. They are currently made by Walnettos Incorporated of Valencia, California.

Comedian Arte Johnson's dirty-old-man character Tyrone Horneigh on the popular 1968-1973 television comedy Laugh-In used the tagline "Wanna Walnetto?" which briefly entered popular culture as a minor comedic catchphrase and spurred sales.

== Notes ==
1. However, the name "Walnettos" was not registered until 1922.
