= Swoops =

Chocolate candy

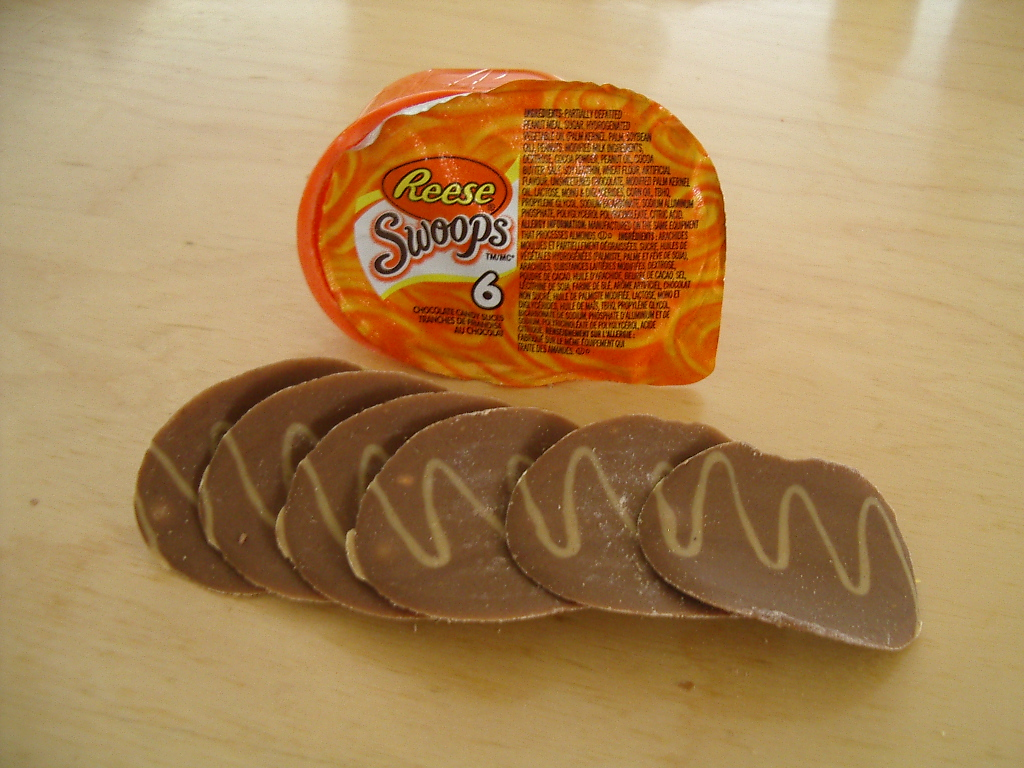
Reese's Peanut Butter Swoops

Swoops were a chocolate candy manufactured by The Hershey Company. They were produced in the following flavors: Hershey's Milk Chocolate, Reese's Peanut Butter, Almond Joy, York Peppermint Pattie, White Chocolate Reeses, and Toffee and Almond. Limited edition varieties included White Chocolate Peppermint (available around Christmas), Special Dark with Almonds, and Strawberries & Creme. They were introduced into the market in 2003 and discontinued in August 2006. According to a market research study of April 2004, only 14% of the customers knew Swoops.
