= Peter Paul Halajian =

Armenian American confectioner and businessman (1864–1927)

Peter Paul
- Born: Peter Halajian; March 9, 1871; Harput, Turkey
- Died: January 21, 1927 (aged 55); Waterbury, Connecticut
- Occupations: Confectioner, entrepreneur
- Known for: Founder of Peter Paul Candy Manufacturing Company

Peter Paul Halajian (1871 – 1927) was an Armenian-American candy manufacturer in the New Haven, Connecticut, area and founder of the Peter Paul Candy Manufacturing Company.

Born Peter Halajian in the Ottoman Empire, he immigrated to the U.S. in 1888 and worked in a rubber factory, opening a candy shop on February 1, 1895, in Naugatuck, Connecticut, and changing his surname to Paul. After selling chocolate bars to the U.S. Army for use by soldiers in World War I, who demanded them when they came home, he teamed with five other Armenian investors – his brother-in-law Cal Kazanjian, Cal's cousin Artin Kazanjian, chemist George Shamlian, Jacob Chouljian and his cousin Jacob Hagopian – to form the Peter Paul Candy Manufacturing Company on Webster Street in New Haven in 1919 with $6,000. The company at first sold various brands of candies, including the Mounds bar, but following sugar and coconut shortages in World War II, they dropped most brands and concentrated on the Mounds bar, with the U.S. military purchasing as much as 80% of their output by 1944, packing 5 million candy bars monthly into combat rations. The Almond Joy bar was introduced in 1946. In 1978 Peter Paul merged with Cadbury-Schweppes.

Paul died on January 21,1927, at Waterbury Hospital.
