= Hop Brook Lake =

Man-made reservoir in Connecticut, United States

- Location within Connecticut Location within the United States
- Location: New Haven County, Connecticut
- Coordinates: 41°30′49″N 73°03′59″W
- Type: reservoir
- Primary inflows: Hop Brook
- Primary outflows: Hop Brook
- Basin countries: United States
- Surface area: 16.4 sq mi (42 km^{2})

Hop Brook Lake is spread over three communities in New Haven County, Connecticut, United States. These communities are Naugatuck, Middlebury, and Waterbury. A dam was created across Hop Brook in Naugatuck and the lake that was created is known as Hop Brook Lake.

== Construction ==
Construction of the dam commenced in December 1965 and was completed in December 1968, costing $6.2 million. The relocation of 1.8 miles (2.9 km) of Route 63 was required. The project includes an earthfill dam with stone slope protection 520 feet (160 m) long and 97 feet (30 m) high; an earthfill dike measuring 400 feet (120 m) long and 33 feet (10 m) high; a gated rectangular 425-foot (130 m)-long concrete conduit three feet wide and five feet high; and a chute spillway edged in rock with a 200-footlong broad-crested weir. The weir's crest elevation is 17 feet (5.2 m) lower than the top of the dam.

The flood storage area of the project, which is normally empty and is only utilized to store floodwaters, is 1.5 miles (2.4 km) long and spreads out over 270 acres (1.1 km^{2}). The project and associated lands total 553 acres (2.24 km^{2}) throughout Naugatuck, Middlebury, and Waterbury. Hop Brook Lake can store up to 2.23 billion US gallons (8,400,000 m^{3}) of water for flood control purposes. This is equivalent to eight inches (200 mm) of water covering its drainage area of 16.4 square miles (42 km^{2}).

== Recreation ==
Hop Brook Lake contains a 21-acre (85,000 m^{2}) recreation pool that has a maximum depth of 18 feet (5.5 m).

Hop Brook Lake contains largemouth bass and panfish. The state stocks both the lake and its feeder streams with trout. Recreational development of the reservoir includes picnic sites, walking trails, a beach, ball field, drinking water, and sanitary and parking facilities.

In 2002, a man drowned at Hop Brook Lake.

== Park rangers ==
Hop Brook Lake is controlled by the Army Corps of Engineers.
