= Sand cleaning machine =

Machine, usually pulled by a Tractor, for cleaning sand on a beach

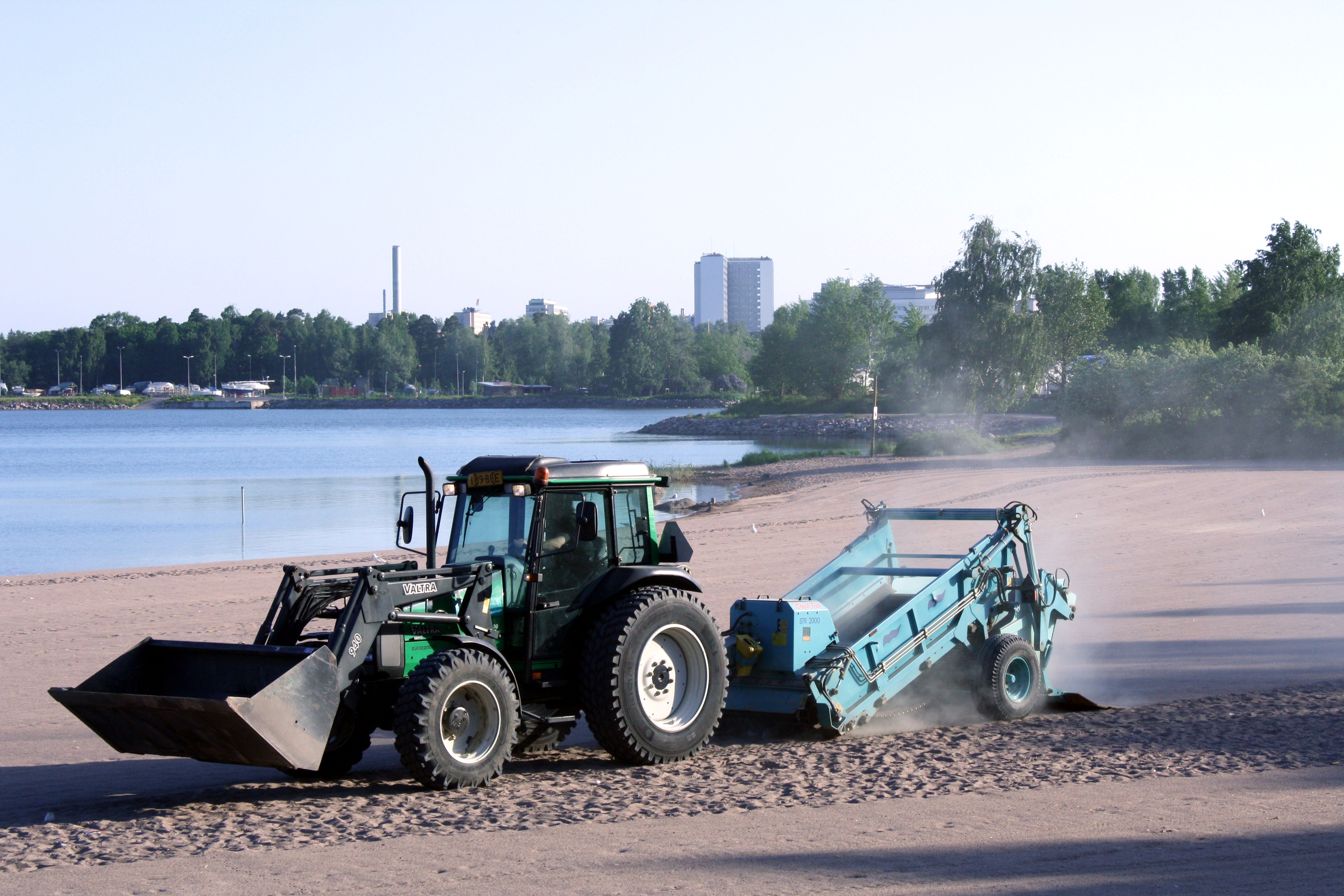
A tractor-pulled beach cleaner at Hietaniemi beach in Helsinki, Finland

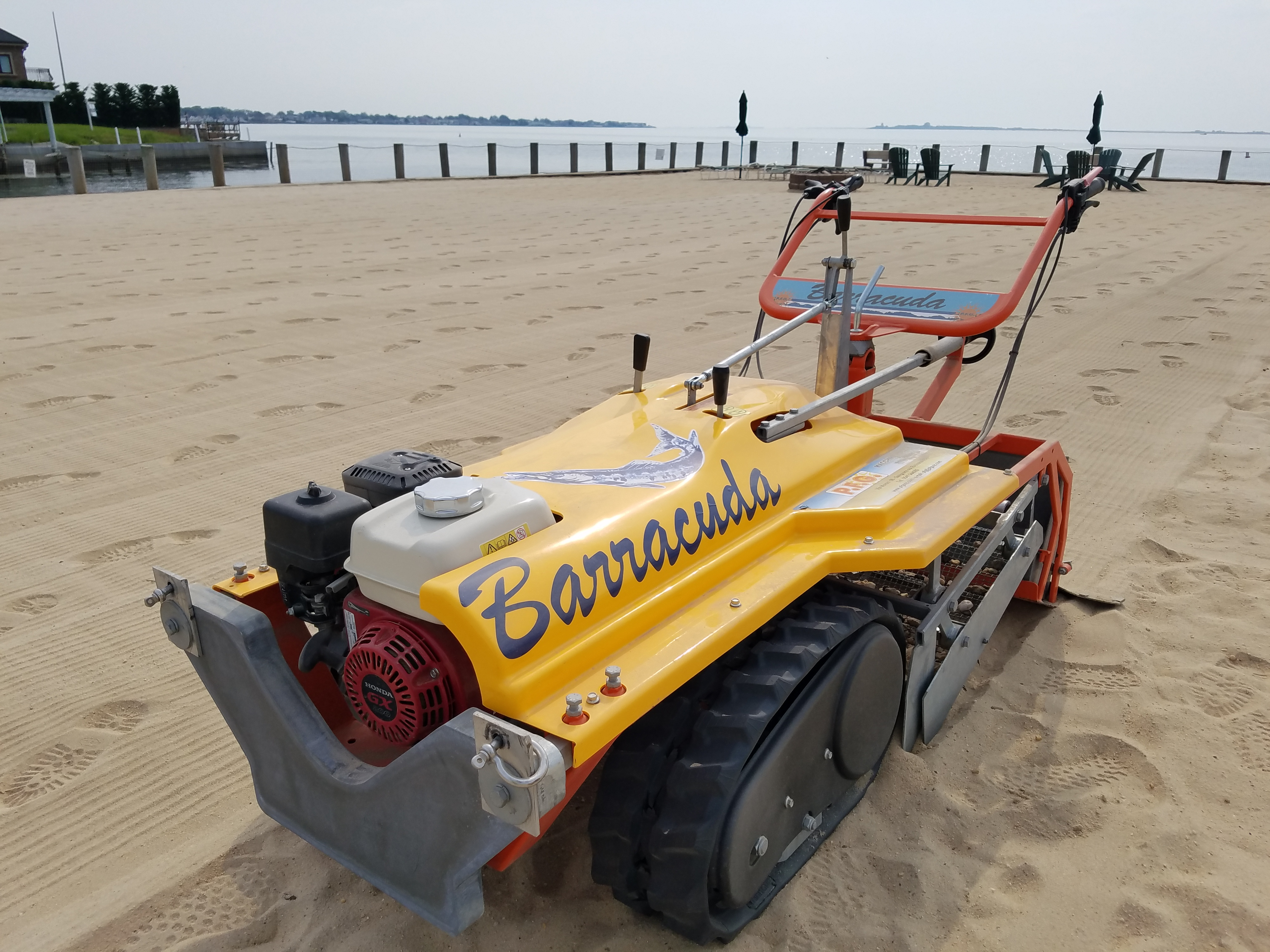
Walk-behind beach cleaner

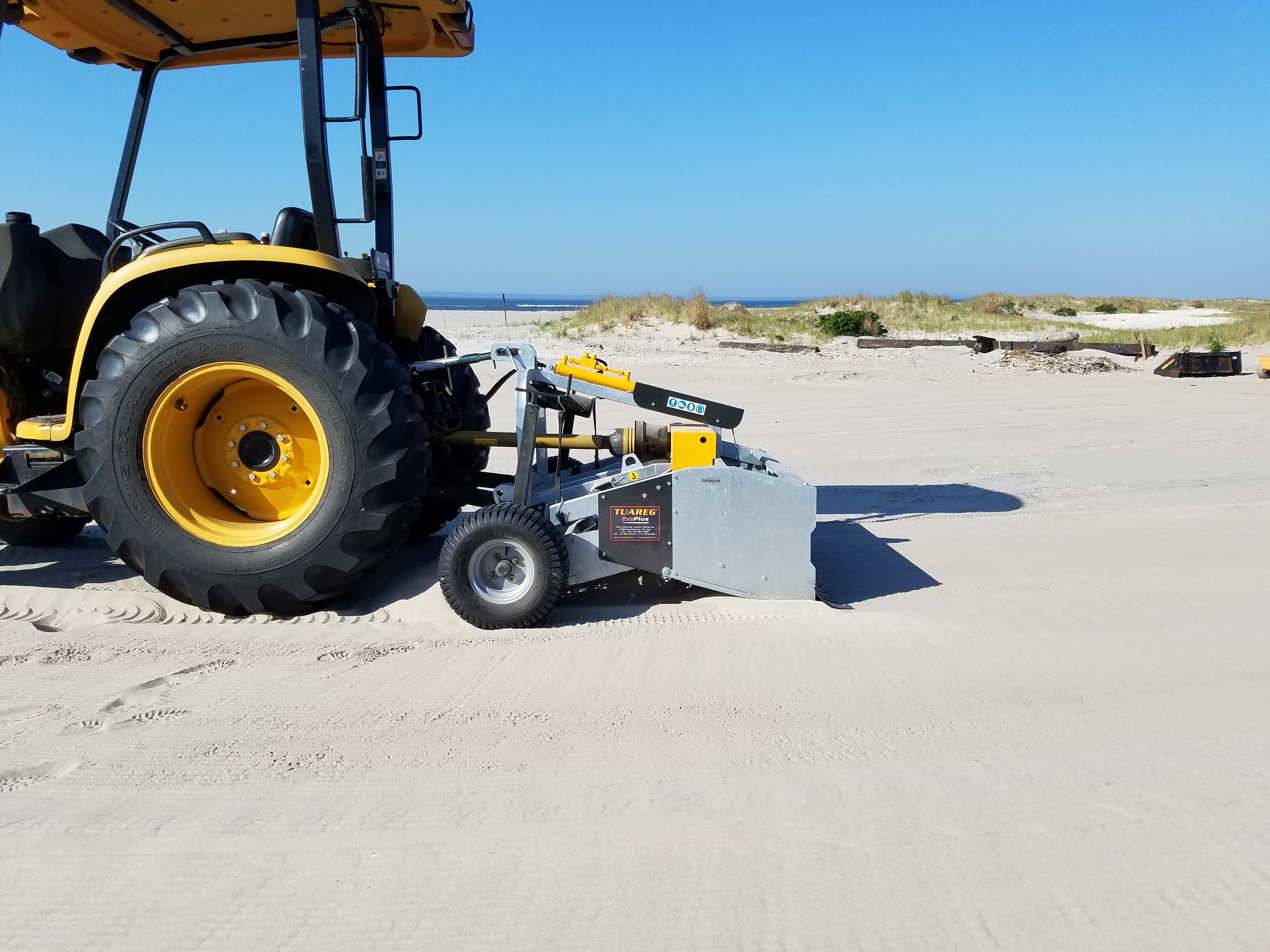
Tractor Attached Beach Cleaner

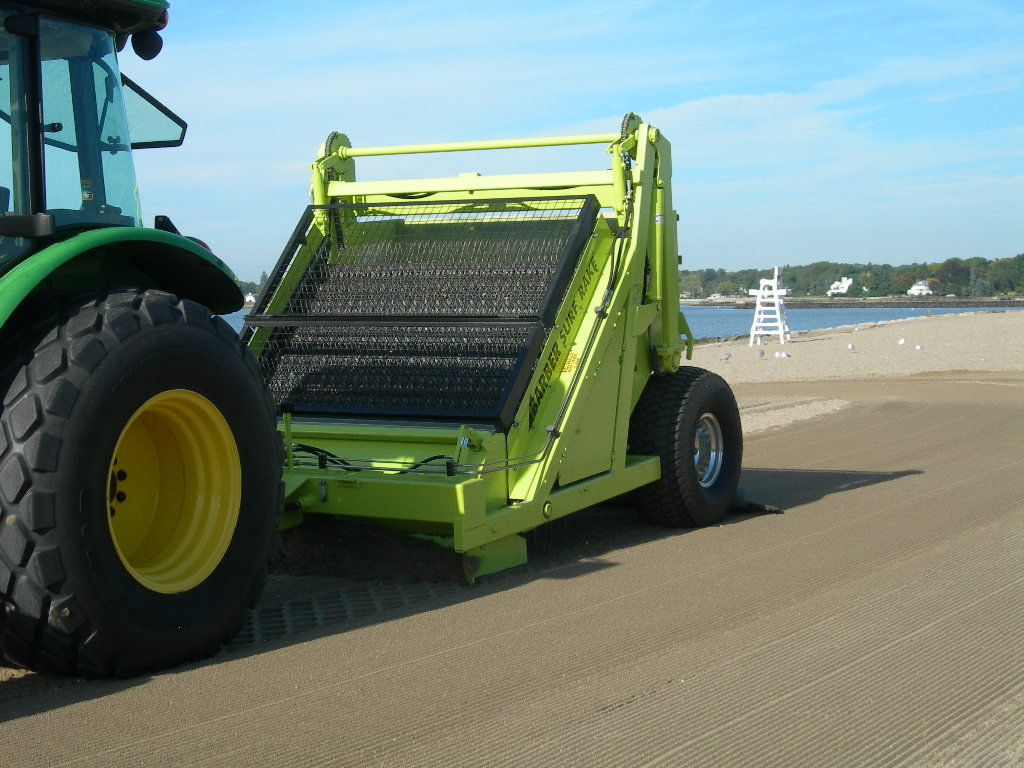
Raking beach cleaner

A sand cleaning machine, beach cleaner, or (colloquially) sandboni is a vehicle that drags a raking or sifting device over beach sand to remove rubbish and other foreign matter. They are manually self-pulled vehicles on tracks or wheels or pulled by quad-bike or tractor. Seaside cities use beach cleaning machines to combat the problems of litter left by beach patrons and other pollution washed up on their shores. A chief task in beach cleaning strategies is finding the best way to handle waste matter on the beaches, taking into consideration beach erosion and changing terrain. Beach cleaning machines work by collecting sand by way of a scoop or drag mechanism and then raking or sifting anything large enough to be considered foreign matter, including sticks, stones, litter and other items.

Similar applications include lake beaches, sandfields for beach volleyball and kindergarten and playing field sandpits. The word "sandboni" is a back-formation referencing the ice-surfacing machine Zamboni.

== Common technologies ==
Raking technology
This can be used on dry or wet sand. When using this method, a rotating conveyor belt containing hundreds of offset tines combs through the sand and removes surface and buried debris while leaving the sand on the beach. Raking machines can remove materials ranging in size from small pebbles, shards of glass, and cigarette butts to larger debris, like seaweed and driftwood. By keeping the sand on the beach and only lifting the debris, raking machines can travel at high speeds.
Sifting technology
This is practiced on dry sand and soft surfaces. The sand and waste are collected via the pick-up blade of the vehicle onto a vibrating screening belt, which leaves the sand behind. The waste is gathered in a collecting tray which is often situated at the back of the vehicle. Because sand and waste are lifted onto the screening belt, sifters must allow time for the sand to sift through the screen and back onto the beach. The size of the materials removed is governed by the size of the holes in the installed screen.
Combined raking and sifting technology
This differs from pure sifting in that it uses rotating tines to scoop sand and debris onto a vibrating screen instead of relying simply on the pick-up blade. The tines' position can be adjusted to more effectively guide different-sized materials onto the screen. Once on the screen, combined raking and sifting machines use the same technology as normal sifters to remove unwanted debris from the sand.
Sand sifting by hand
This is used for smaller areas or sensitive habitat. Sand and debris is collected into a windrow or pile and manually shoveled onto screened sifting trays to separate the debris from the sand. While effective, it requires the movement of sand to the site of the tray, and then redistribution of the sand after sifting. A more efficient method is the use of a screened fork at the place where the debris is located. The effort to manually agitate the sand can become tiresome; however, a recent development of a battery-powered sand rake combines the spot cleaning effectiveness of manual screening with the ease of an auto-sifting hand tool.

== Areas of operation ==
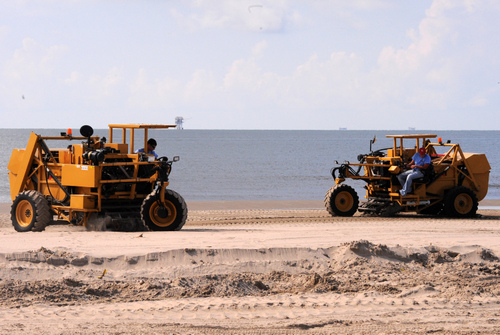
Sandboni at the gulf of Mexico

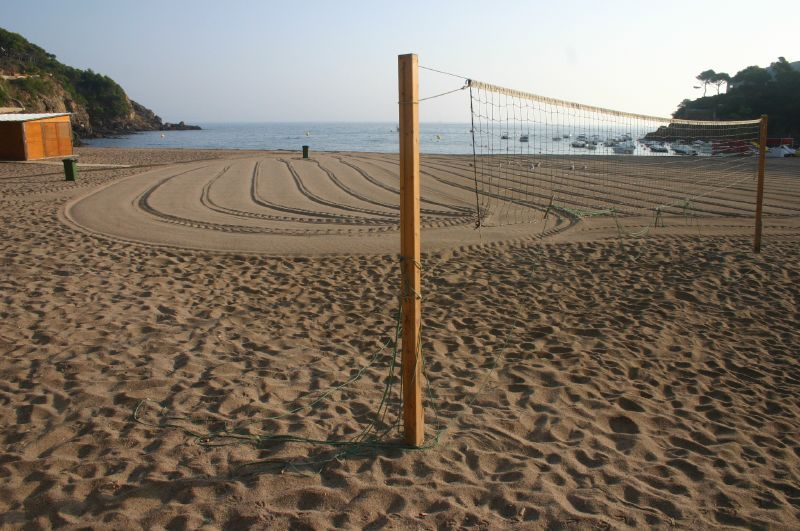
Beach volleyball field after rework of a sand cleaner

Sand cleaning machines are used all over the world for the purpose of the safety and happiness of beach-goers. By removing litter, unwanted seaweed, and other debris from the beach, municipalities and resorts are able to maintain their beaches with fewer invested hours.

In addition to their regular litter-removing uses, beach and sand cleaners have been used to clean up after natural disasters. For example:

In Galveston, Texas, low oxygen levels in the water resulted in thousands of dead fish washing ashore. Raking sand cleaners were then used to remove the rotting fish off the beach before they released excessive toxins into the air, sand, and water.

The Olympic Games 2008 saw the first remote-control Sandbonis for the beach volleyball fields in Beijing Chaoyang Park.

The cleanup after the Deepwater Horizon oil spill saw large applications of sand cleaners to the area. Similarly, the Rena oil spill in New Zealand also saw beach cleaners deployed in an effort to remove the affected sand.

== Manufacturers ==
The major manufacturers of large beach-sand cleaning machines are considered to be H Barber & Sons, Cherrington, BeachTech, PFG Srl, Tuareg Srl, D'Hooghe machinebouw, ingeniería Flozaga Guterh Sl, Scam, Rockland, Qingzhou Rio, Tirrenia Srl and CleanSands.

There are many other manufacturers of sand cleaners being used for other purposes. For example, a smaller 4-wheel and halftrack sand cleaning machine is used for sandpits in kindergarten and municipality playing fields and for beach volleyball. When environmental or spot-cleaning requires hand operations, an auto-sifting, lightweight, screened rake can be the best choice.

== See also ==
- Marine debris
- Waste collector – Person employed by a public or private enterprise to collect and dispose of waste
