= Gunntown Cemetery =

Old cemetery in Naugatuck, CT

Coordinates: 41.4908°N 73.1042°W

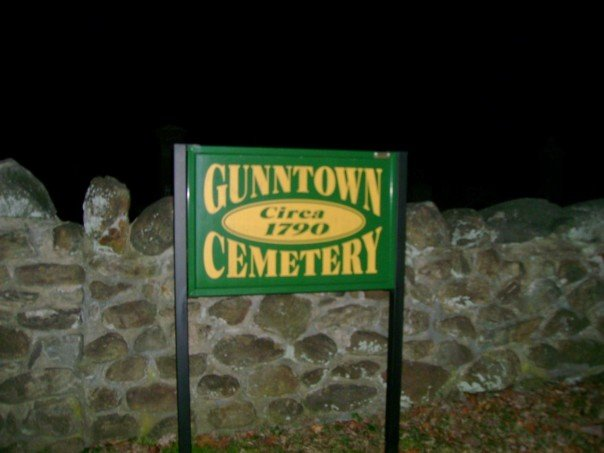
The entrance to Gunntown Cemetery in 2007

Gunntown Cemetery is an old cemetery in Naugatuck, Connecticut which was established in 1790. Many of Naugatuck's citizens who supported independence from British rule during the Revolutionary War are buried in the cemetery. The cemetery is also considered by many to be haunted.

== The Gunns ==
The history of the Gunn family has been traced to before the colony of Connecticut. The first to arrive to Connecticut was Scottish-born Jasper Gunn (1606-1670). His first journey was from London to Boston on October 8, 1635. He and his wife then made their way to Roxbury, CT. Looking to start his own small colony, Jasper, with several other families from Roxbury and Dorchester, purchased even more land from the local Indians. Then on November 24, 1640, this area was named the town of Milford. Being considered one of the founders of Milford, Jasper Gunn was also considered to be Milford's first physician. After living in Milford for a while, he and his family moved around Connecticut a few times; in 1647 they moved to Harford. Along with being a doctor, Jasper Gunn did many other things. He was also a deacon at the church in Milford, a lawyer (for a few cases), and sealer of weights and measures. With all his life experience, he was made the main operator at Hartford’s Mill from 1649 to 1658. At his death in 1670, he and his wife Christian had seven children. His decedents have since spread throughout Connecticut, including Naugatuck.

The area that was once called Gunntown is an 800-acre area located just off of Naugatuck’s Rubber Ave Ext. The Gunn family was said to have lived and operated a sawmill in this area sometime around the 1740s. The Gunntown cemetery lies somewhat in the middle of area, with many people buried there bearing the same name.

== Folklore ==
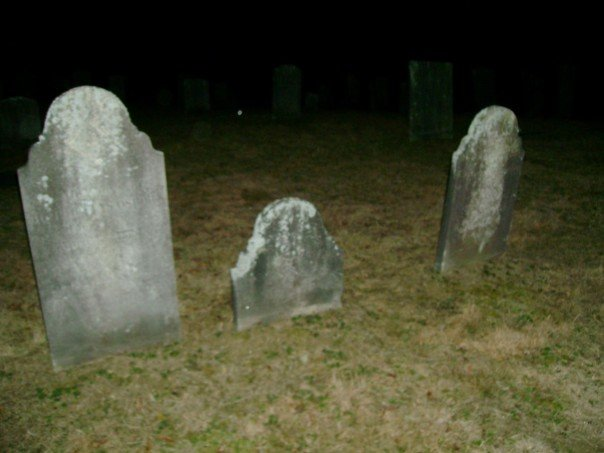
Gunntown Cemetery in 2007. A small orb is supposedly seen in the background.

Many photographs that have been taken at the cemetery are purported to show spirit energy in the form of orbs, globules or ectoplasmic mist. On rare occasions, visitors have claimed to see colorful orbs flitting about the grounds with the naked eye.
