= Naugatuck, Connecticut =

Consolidated borough and town in Connecticut, United States

- Borough
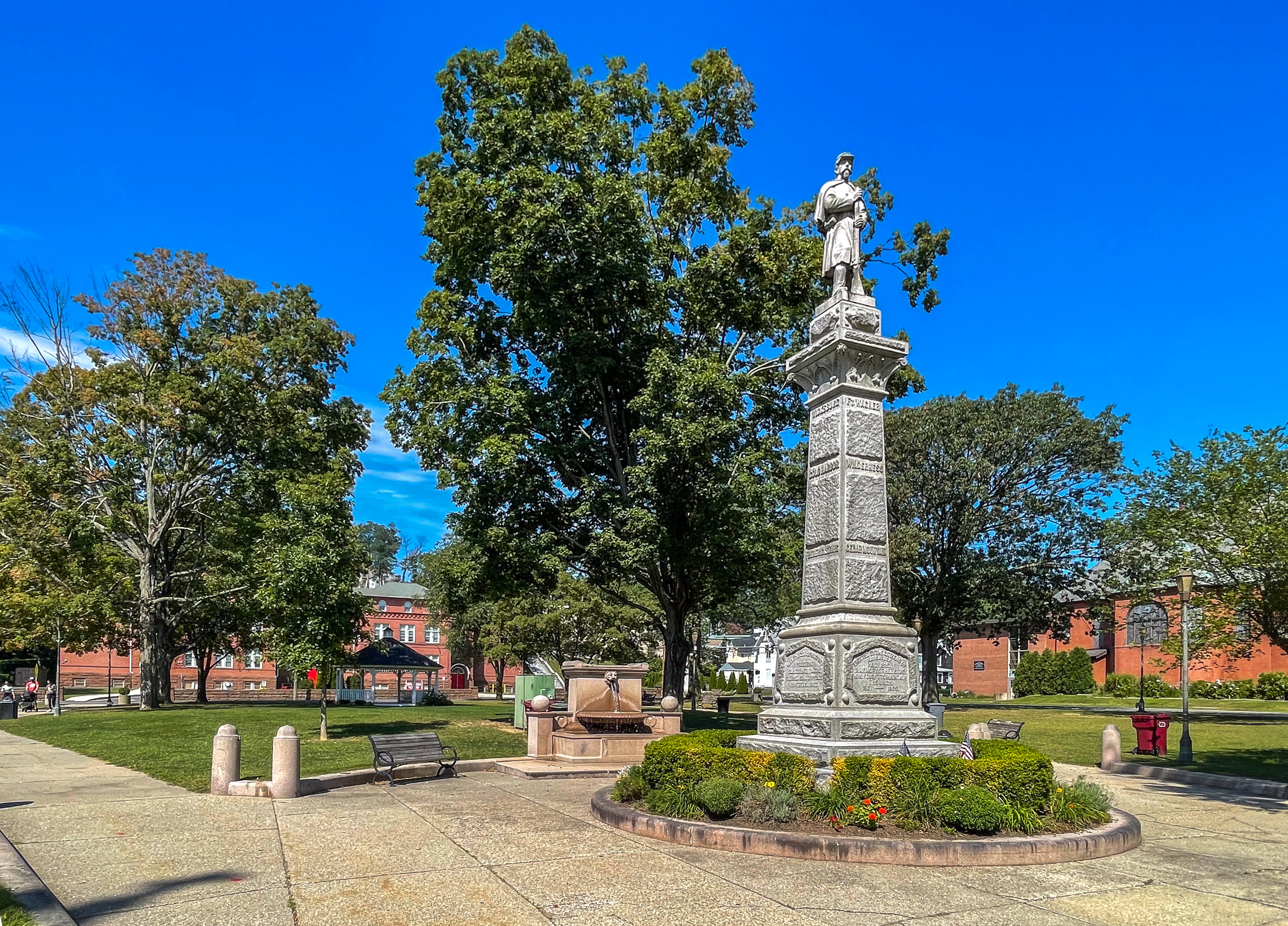
- Naugatuck Green

- Seal
- Nickname: "Naugy"
- Coordinates: 41°29′23″N 73°03′05″W
- Country: United States
- U.S. state: Connecticut
- County: New Haven
- Region: Naugatuck Valley
- Incorporated: 1844; 182 years ago
- Consolidated: 1895; 131 years ago

Government
  - Type: Mayor–council (mayor and burgesses)
  - Mayor: N. Warren "Pete" Hess

Area
  - Total: 16.39 sq mi (42.46 km^{2})
  - Land: 16.30 sq mi (42.21 km^{2})
  - Water: 0.097 sq mi (0.25 km^{2})
- Elevation: 207 ft (63 m)

Population (2020)
  - Total: 31,519
  - Density: 1,934/sq mi (746.7/km^{2})
- Time zone: UTC−5 (Eastern)
  - Summer (DST): UTC−4 (Eastern)
- ZIP code: 06770
- Area codes: 203/475
- FIPS code: 09-49880
- GNIS feature ID: 0209191
- Website: www.naugatuck-ct.gov

Naugatuck (/ˈnɔːɡətʌk/; NAW-gə-tuhk) is a consolidated borough and town in New Haven County, Connecticut, United States. The town, part of the Naugatuck Valley Planning Region, had a population of 31,519 as of the 2020 census.

The town spans both sides of the Naugatuck River just south of Waterbury and includes the communities of Union City on the east side of the river, Straitsville on the southeast (along Route 63), and Millville on the west (along Rubber Avenue).

== Etymology ==
The town has been named after Naugatuck River. Along the path of the river, various Algonquian bands, often included in the Wappinger tribe, originally inhabited the Naugatuck River Valley. Thus the name "Naugatuck" is derived from a term from the local Algonquian dialect meaning "lone tree by the fishing place". One early 19th-century author explained that this name originally referred to a specific tree along the river in the area of modern-day Beacon Falls, but came to be applied broadly to the entire river over time.

== History ==
Settlement began as early as 1702. Samuel Hickox (1669–1713), credited as Naugatuck’s first settler, established a fulling mill on Fulling Mill Brook in 1709. The locality was known as Judds Meadow until 1752, when it was renamed Salem Bridge.

In 1844, parts of Waterbury, Bethany, and Oxford incorporated as the town of Naugatuck. The Borough of Naugatuck was established in 1893 and became coextensive with the town in 1895.

As the Industrial Revolution accelerated, Naugatuck developed a diverse manufacturing base and became a center of the rubber industry. In 1892, nine firms consolidated to form the United States Rubber Company (later Uniroyal Inc.), organized in Naugatuck, which for decades kept major operations in the borough. In 1936, U.S. Rubber introduced Naugahyde, a vinyl-coated fabric invented by company chemists in Naugatuck; the material was manufactured locally for many years.

Naugatuck

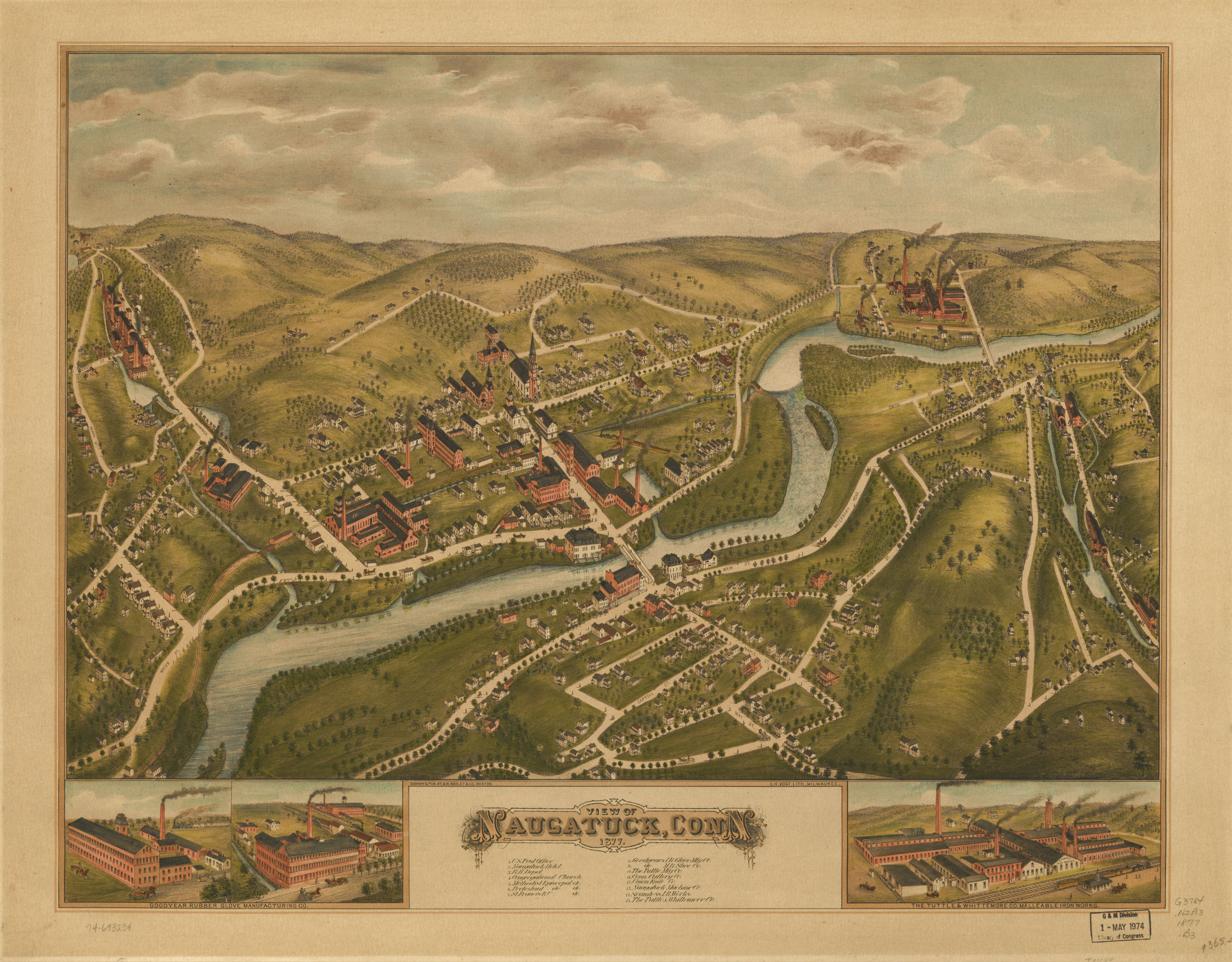
Map of Naugatuck (c. 1877)

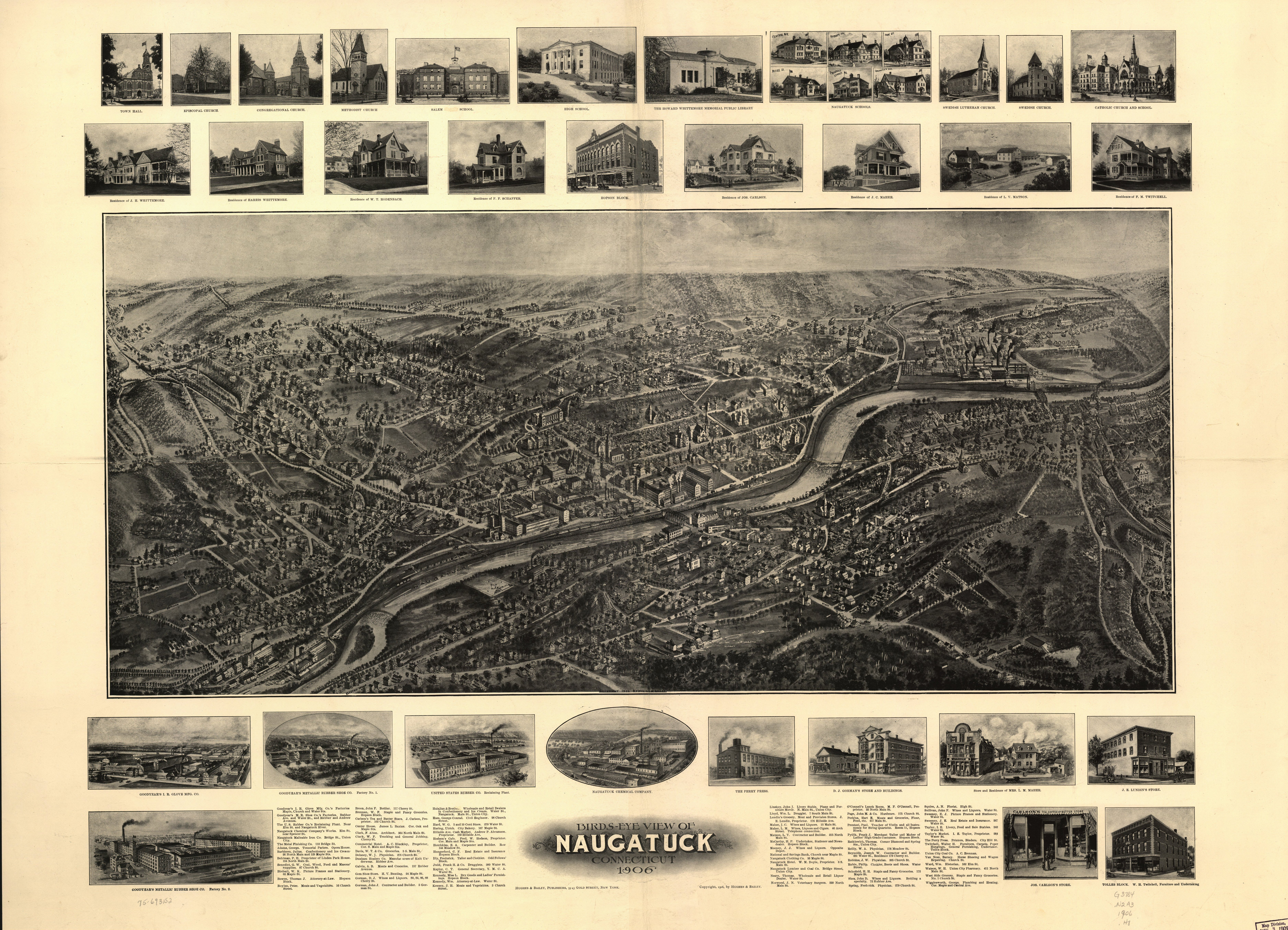
Map of Naugatuck (c. 1906)

The United States Rubber Company also created the Naugatuck Chemical Company in the early 20th century; the business later became Uniroyal Chemical and relocated major operations to Middlebury, Connecticut in the 1970s.

The Risdon Manufacturing Company, established in Naugatuck in the early 1900s, became a leading maker of metal closures and cosmetic packaging and later operated regionally under Crown Risdon.

In the 1960s, Harold Barber founded H. Barber and Sons, which designs and builds beach-cleaning equipment and has claimed to be the largest such business in the world.

Peter Paul Candy Manufacturing Company, later a division of the Hershey Foods Corporation producing Almond Joy and Mounds, operated in Naugatuck for much of the 20th century; the factory closed in 2007.

On August 19, 1955, the Naugatuck River flooded following more than 10 inches (250 mm) of rain from Hurricane Diane, causing widespread destruction that reshaped the borough’s riverfront.

Naugatuck High School has a long-standing football rivalry with Ansonia. The teams have met on Thanksgiving morning since 1900, with Ansonia holding the series lead. Naugatuck High School’s mascot is the greyhound, and its colors are garnet and gray.

== Geography ==
According to the United States Census Bureau, the borough has a total area of 16.5 square miles (43 km^{2}), of which 16.4 square miles (42 km^{2}) is land and 0.1 square miles (0.26 km^{2}), or 0.36%, is water.

== Demographics ==
Historical population
Census	Pop.	Note	%±
1850	1,720		—
1860	2,590		50.6%
1870	2,830		9.3%
1880	4,274		51.0%
1890	6,218		45.5%
1900	10,541		69.5%
1910	12,722		20.7%
1920	15,051		18.3%
1930	14,315		−4.9%
1940	15,388		7.5%
1950	17,455		13.4%
1960	19,511		11.8%
1970	23,034		18.1%
1980	26,456		14.9%
1990	30,625		15.8%
2000	30,989		1.2%
2010	31,862		2.8%
2020	31,519		−1.1%
2025 (est.)	32,230	▲	2.3%
U.S. Decennial Census

=== 2020 census ===
As of the 2020 census, there were 31,519 people, 12,432 households, and 13,239 housing units in the borough. The population density was 1,933.8 inhabitants per square mile (746.6/km^{2}), and the average housing-unit density was 812.2 per square mile (313.6/km^{2}). The racial makeup of the borough was 71.4% White, 7.8% Black or African American, 0.2% American Indian and Alaska Native, 2.4% Asian, 0.1% Native Hawaiian and Other Pacific Islander, 7.4% from some other race, and 10.8% from two or more races. Hispanic or Latino residents of any race were 15.5% of the population.

Of the 12,432 households, 30.2% included children under the age of 18, 45.1% were married-couple households, 8.3% were cohabiting-couple households, 18.2% had a male householder with no spouse or partner present, and 28.4% had a female householder with no spouse or partner present. About 26.9% of households consisted of a single individual, and 11.3% had someone 65 years of age or older living alone.

In 2020, 21.1% of Naugatuck residents were under the age of 18, 62.8% were between 18 and 64, and 16.1% were 65 or older; the median age was 40.2 years. Males made up 48.7% of the population and females 51.3%.

=== 2020–2024 American Community Survey ===
According to the American Community Survey 5-year estimates for 2020–2024, the median household income in Naugatuck was $96,324 and the per capita income was $44,375. About 6.3% of all individuals had incomes below the poverty line. Among residents aged 25 and older, 91.0% held at least a high school diploma and 32.2% held a bachelor's degree or higher. An estimated 17.3% of residents were foreign-born, and the borough was home to approximately 1,086 military veterans, or 4.3% of the civilian population aged 18 and over. The median value of owner-occupied housing units was $259,100.

== Government ==
Naugatuck is the only consolidated town and borough in Connecticut. Every other borough in the state is a special-services district located within a town, the basic unit of Connecticut local government. Naugatuck has both a town clerk and a borough clerk managing official records, similar to cities that have separate town and city clerks.

As with most other Connecticut municipalities, Naugatuck elects its officials in November of odd-numbered years.

=== Politics ===
Registration and Party Enrollment Statistics

Registration and Party Enrollment Statistics as of October 17, 2025
Party	Active voters	Inactive voters	Total voters	Percentage
Democratic	5,585	230	5,815	28.97%
Republican	4,905	199	5,104	25.43%
Unaffiliated	8,415	416	8,831	44%
Minor parties	310	11	321	1.6%
Total	19,215	856	20,071	100%

United States presidential election results

United States presidential election results for Naugatuck, Connecticut
Year	Republican / Whig		Democratic		Third party(ies)	
Year	No.	%	No.	%	No.	%
2024	7647	54.25%	6252	44.35%	197	1.40%
2020	7740	51.93%	6923	46.45%	241	1.62%
2016	7310	55.45%	5219	39.59%	653	4.95%
2012	5807	48.73%	5923	49.70%	187	1.57%
2008	6148	46.07%	7034	52.71%	163	1.22%
2004	6838	53.20%	5745	44.70%	270	2.10%
2000	4930	42.64%	5980	51.73%	651	5.63%
1996	4030	35.62%	5400	47.73%	1884	16.65%
1992	5371	38.69%	4410	31.77%	4102	29.55%
1988	6147	55.20%	4857	43.62%	132	1.19%
1984	7865	67.51%	3732	32.03%	53	0.45%
1980	5914	53.43%	3863	34.90%	1292	11.67%
1976	5587	50.64%	5343	48.43%	103	0.93%
1972	6086	55.57%	4704	42.95%	161	1.47%
1968	3225	33.69%	5573	58.22%	774	8.09%
1964	2562	27.50%	6753	72.50%	0	0.00%
1960	3711	37.83%	6099	62.17%	0	0.00%
1956	5644	59.85%	3786	40.15%	0	0.00%
1952	4913	51.15%	4675	48.67%	18	0.19%
1948	3604	45.02%	4289	53.58%	112	1.40%
1944	3246	41.89%	4502	58.11%	0	0.00%
1940	2947	39.36%	4540	60.64%	0	0.00%
1936	2098	34.07%	4060	65.93%	0	0.00%
1932	2184	43.59%	2826	56.41%	0	0.00%
1928	2459	46.59%	2773	52.54%	46	0.87%
1924	2132	49.17%	1536	35.42%	668	15.41%
1920	2084	53.67%	1593	41.02%	206	5.31%
1916	861	39.97%	1159	53.81%	134	6.22%
1912	381	20.40%	702	37.58%	785	42.02%
1908	976	46.83%	900	43.19%	208	9.98%
1904	1076	51.02%	824	39.07%	209	9.91%
1900	843	40.70%	1199	57.89%	29	1.40%
1896	945	48.31%	995	50.87%	16	0.82%
1888	538	46.30%	558	48.02%	66	5.68%
1884	397	47.15%	445	52.85%	0	0.00%
1880	354	41.89%	491	58.11%	0	0.00%
1876	291	39.22%	451	60.78%	0	0.00%
1872	217	42.47%	0	0.00%	294	57.53%
1868	201	39.64%	306	60.36%	0	0.00%
1864	178	39.38%	274	60.62%	0	0.00%
1860	236	50.11%	82	17.41%	153	32.48%
1856	204	45.33%	246	54.67%	0	0.00%
1852	174	46.77%	198	53.23%	0	0.00%
1848	171	50.44%	161	47.49%	7	2.06%
1844	168	51.22%	160	48.78%	0	0.00%

Notes: 1912 – Third-party total 785 comprised Progressive 274, Socialist 456, and other 55. · 1872 – Votes for Horace Greeley (Liberal Republican), also endorsed by Democrats, are recorded under Third party(ies). · 1860 – “Third-party” votes were for the Southern Democratic ticket.

== Education ==
Naugatuck has four public elementary schools (grades K–4), two public intermediate schools (grades 5–6), one public middle school (grades 7–8), and Naugatuck High School (grades 9–12). The high school’s total enrollment is 1,267.

In 2013, an $81 million renovation of the high school began and was completed by fall 2015.

== Transportation ==
The town is served by Naugatuck station on the Waterbury Branch of the New Haven Line. Principal highways include Connecticut Route 63 (to New Haven), Route 68 (to Durham), and the Route 8 expressway (to Waterbury, Derby, Torrington, and Bridgeport).

== National Register of Historic Places ==
- Bronson B. Tuttle House (380 Church Street), an 1879 Queen Anne–style residence that now houses the Naugatuck History Museum; listed on the National Register on November 29, 1990.
- Naugatuck Center Historic District, roughly bounded by Fairview Avenue, Hillside Avenue, Terrace Avenue, Water Street, and Pleasant View Street; listed July 30, 1999.
- Salem School (124 Meadow Street); listed November 3, 1983.
- United States Post Office–Naugatuck Main (Church and Cedar Streets.); listed January 21, 1986.

== Notable people ==
- Adrian (Adrian Adolph Greenberg, 1903–1959), costume designer; born in Naugatuck
- Michael Bergin (b.1969), model, actor and real estate agent; raised in Naugatuck and NHS graduate
- Seth Bingham (1882—1972), organist and composer; spent part of his youth in Naugatuck
- Emily Sophie Brown (1881–1985), among the first women elected to the Connecticut House of Representatives in 1920; longtime Naugatuck resident
- Harry Cross (1881–1946), sportswriter for The New York Times and the New York Herald Tribune; began his career at the Waterbury American; mentioned among notable Naugatuck students in a borough history.
- Ray Foley (1906–1980), Major League Baseball catcher for the New York Giants in 1928; born in Naugatuck
- Charles Goodyear (1800–1860), pioneered vulcanization of rubber; lived in Naugatuck as a young man
- Peter Paul Halajian (1864–1927), an Armenian immigrant who started the Peter Paul Candy Manufacturing Company in Naugatuck, known for creating the Mounds Bar and Almond Joy
- Mohamed Hrezi (b. 1991), distance runner; 2016 Olympic marathoner
- William Kennedy (1854–1918), state senator and U.S. representative
- Ronald A. Sarasin (1934–2023), U.S. Representative for Connecticut’s 5th district (1973–1979) and 1978 Republican nominee for governor; later president/CEO of the U.S. Capitol Historical Society; graduated from Naugatuck High School.
- Spec Shea (1920–2002), Major League Baseball pitcher; born in Naugatuck and nicknamed “The Naugatuck Nugget”

== Gallery ==
Goodyear Metallic Rubber Shoe Company in downtown Naugatuck (c. 1890)

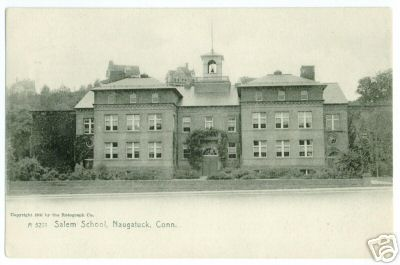
Salem School, from a 1905 postcard

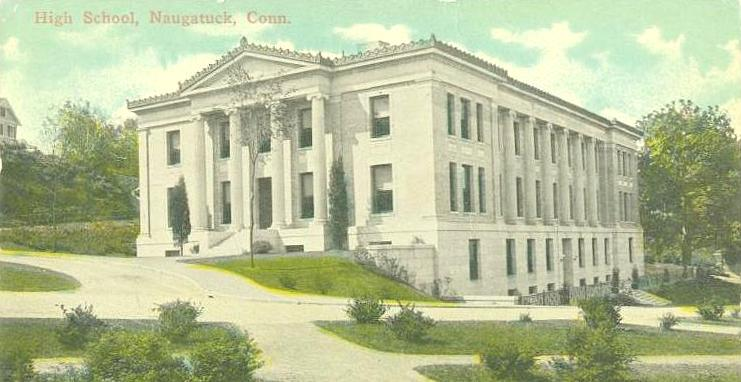
Naugatuck High School (c. 1910), designed by McKim, Mead & White; now Hillside Intermediate School

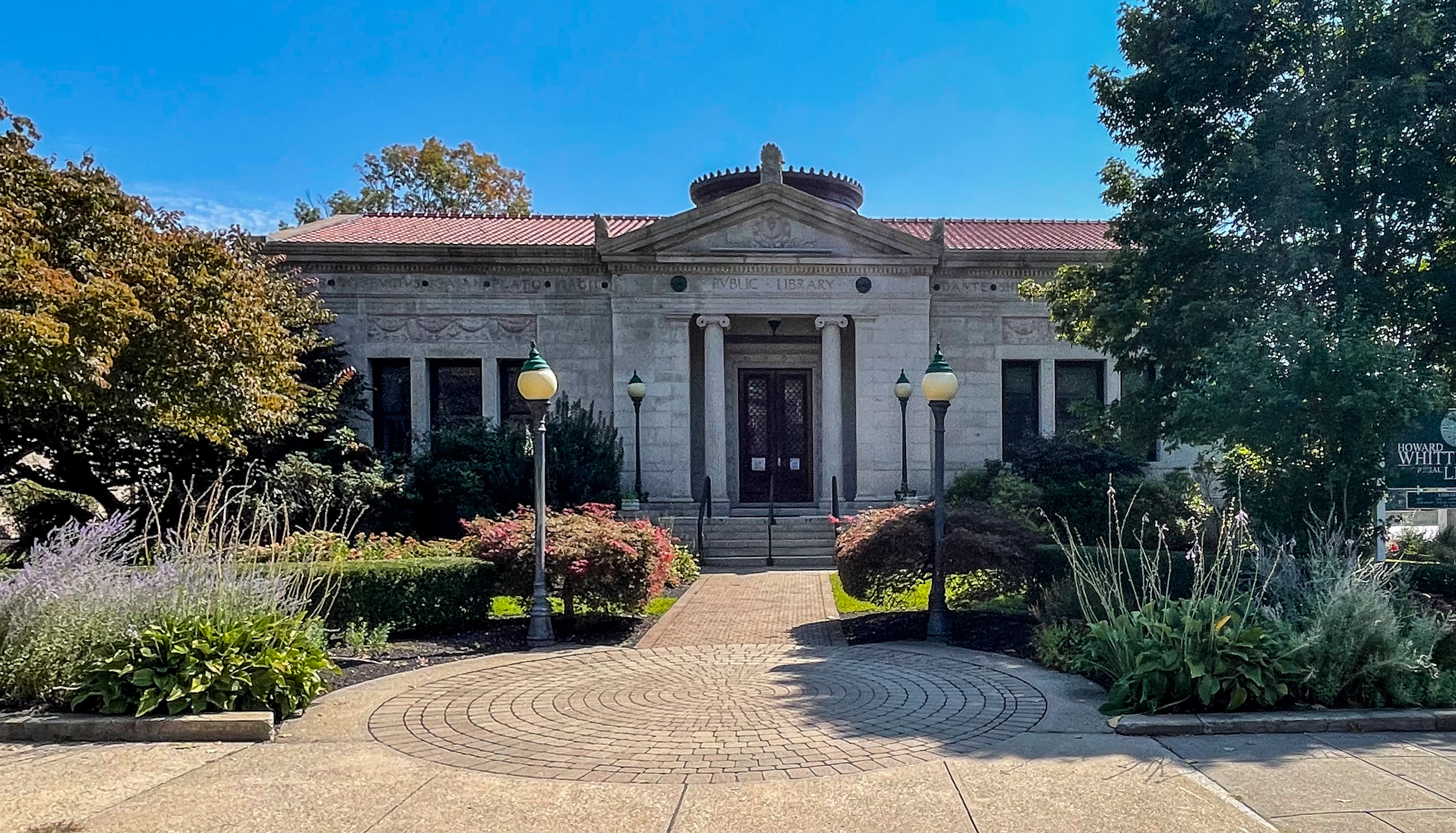
Whittemore Library, designed by McKim, Mead & White

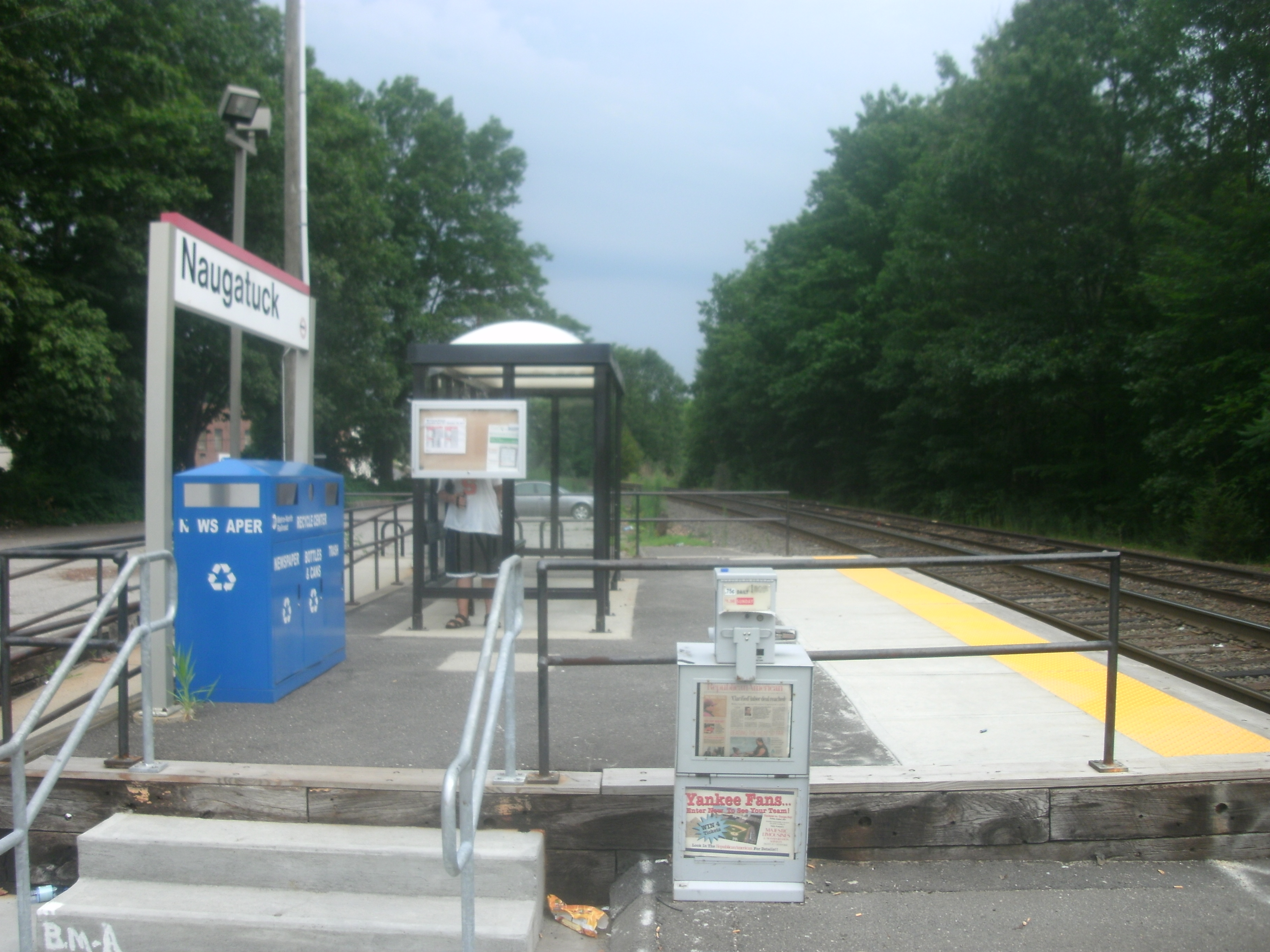
Naugatuck Metro-North Railroad station on the Waterbury Branch

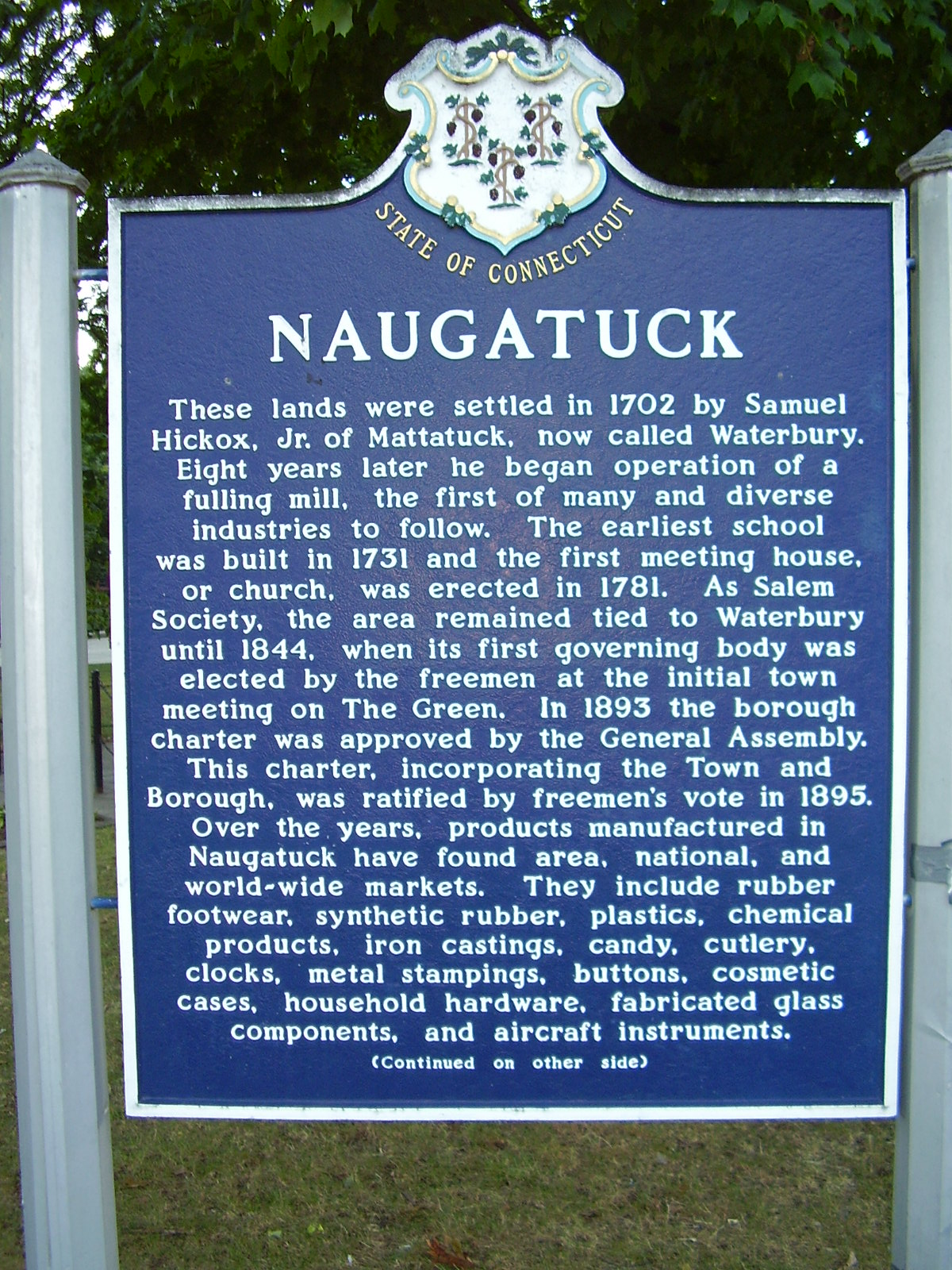
Town history sign on the Naugatuck Green

== See also ==
- Gunntown Cemetery
- Hop Brook Lake
- Laurel Park Incorporated
- Naugatuck State Forest
- St. Hedwig Parish, Union City
