= Salem School (Naugatuck, Connecticut) =

Building in Naugatuck, Connecticut, US

- U.S. National Register of Historic Places
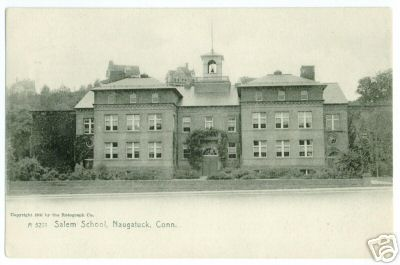
- Salem School in 1905

- Location within Connecticut Location within the United States
- Location: 124 Meadow Street Naugatuck, Connecticut
- Coordinates: 41°29′26″N 73°3′27″W
- Area: 3 acres (1.2 ha)
- Built: 1893; 133 years ago
- Built by: H. Wales Lines Company
- Architect: McKim, Mead & White
- Architectural style: Renaissance Revival
- NRHP reference No.: 83003582
- Added to NRHP: November 3, 1983

The Salem School is a historic school building at 124 Meadow Street (Route 63) in Naugatuck, Connecticut. It is a 2-1/2 story brick Renaissance Revival structure, designed by McKim, Mead & White and built in 1893. It is one of a group of buildings on the Naugatuck Green designed by the firm, and one of only two school buildings in Connecticut designed by the firm (the other is also in Naugatuck). The school (and many of the other buildings) were commissioned by a local industrialist, John Howard Whittemore. The schoolhouse was listed on the National Register of Historic Places on November 3, 1983. The school closed in June 2025 due to funding problems, along with issues caused by the school's aging facilities. So now, it is basically abandoned as of June 2025.

== Architecture and history ==
The Salem School is located in Downtown Naugatuck, occupying a prominent position facing the west end of Naugatuck Green across Meadow Street (Route 63). It is a 2-1/2 story masonry structure, with a main mass covered by a gabled roof, a pair of projecting hip-roofed pavilions, and two-story wings extending to either side. The basement level is finished in rusticated brownstone, while the upper levels are finished in red brick. Stylistically the building has Renaissance Revival features, including rounded arches over the entrances and attic-level windows, stone banding between the floors, and a cornice with dentil moulding between the second floor and attic level.

The school is the third to stand on the same site. The first was a one-room district frame schoolhouse built in 1773, and the second was an Italianate structure built in 1852. The city's significant growth in the late 19th century led to the need for a larger school. The present building was funded by John Howard Whittemore, an industrialist whose businesses were partly responsible for the city's growth. The school's design is attributed to William Rutherford Mead of McKim, Mead & White, and it was built by the H. Wales Lines Company, a local contractor, for $71,000. The design was apparently an echo of the city's former city hall, which also featured red brick construction and an ornate Victorian exterior (that building was demolished in the 1970s). McKim, Mead & White also designed another school for the city, as well as the Congregational church (1902) and the public library (1891).

== Gallery ==
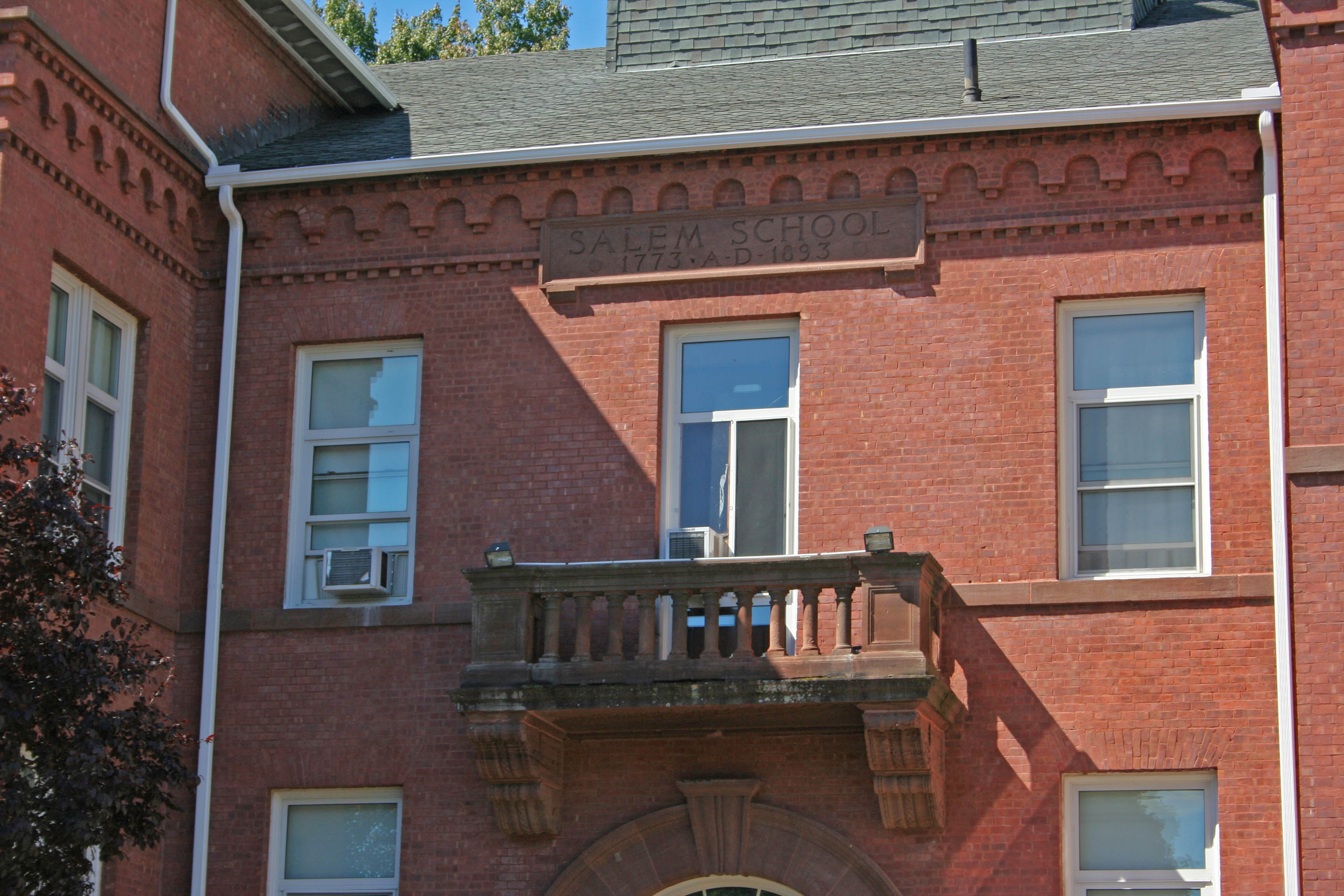
Masonry Above Front Entrance

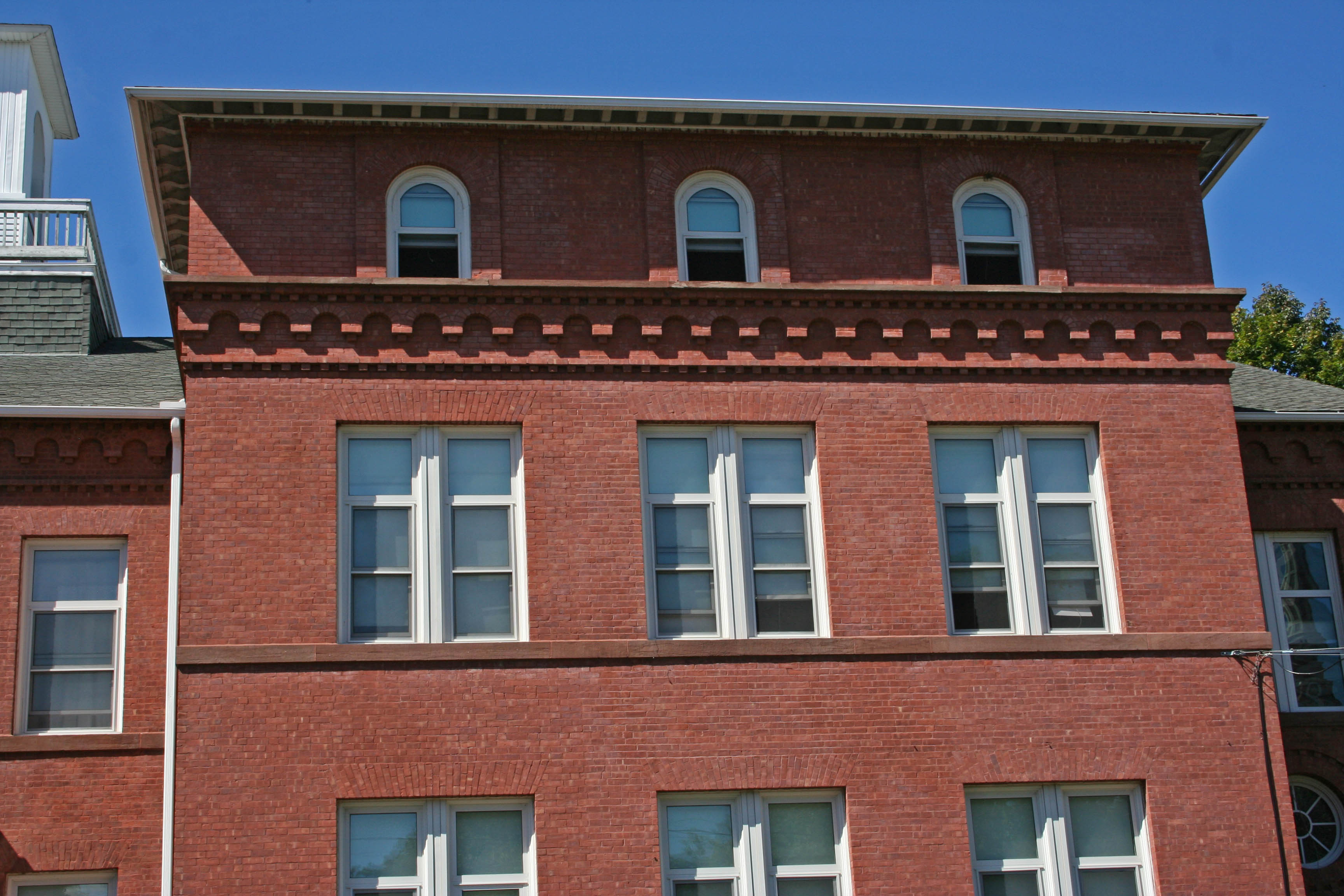
Masonry Details

== See also ==
- National Register of Historic Places listings in New Haven County, Connecticut
