= Ray Foley (baseball) =

American baseball player (1906–1980)

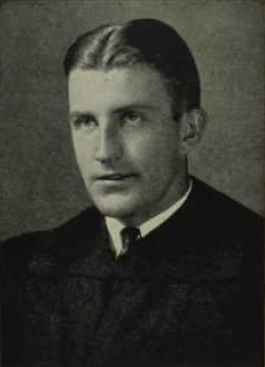
- Foley at Catholic University of America, c. 1928
- Pinch hitter
- Born: June 23, 1906; Naugatuck, Connecticut, US
- Died: March 22, 1980 (aged 73); Vero Beach, Florida, US
- Batted: Left Threw: Right

MLB debut
- July 4, 1928, for the New York Giants

Last MLB appearance
- September 10, 1928, for the New York Giants

MLB statistics
- Batting average: .000 (0-for-1)
- Runs scored: 1
- Games played: 2
- Stats at Baseball Reference

Teams
- New York Giants (1928)

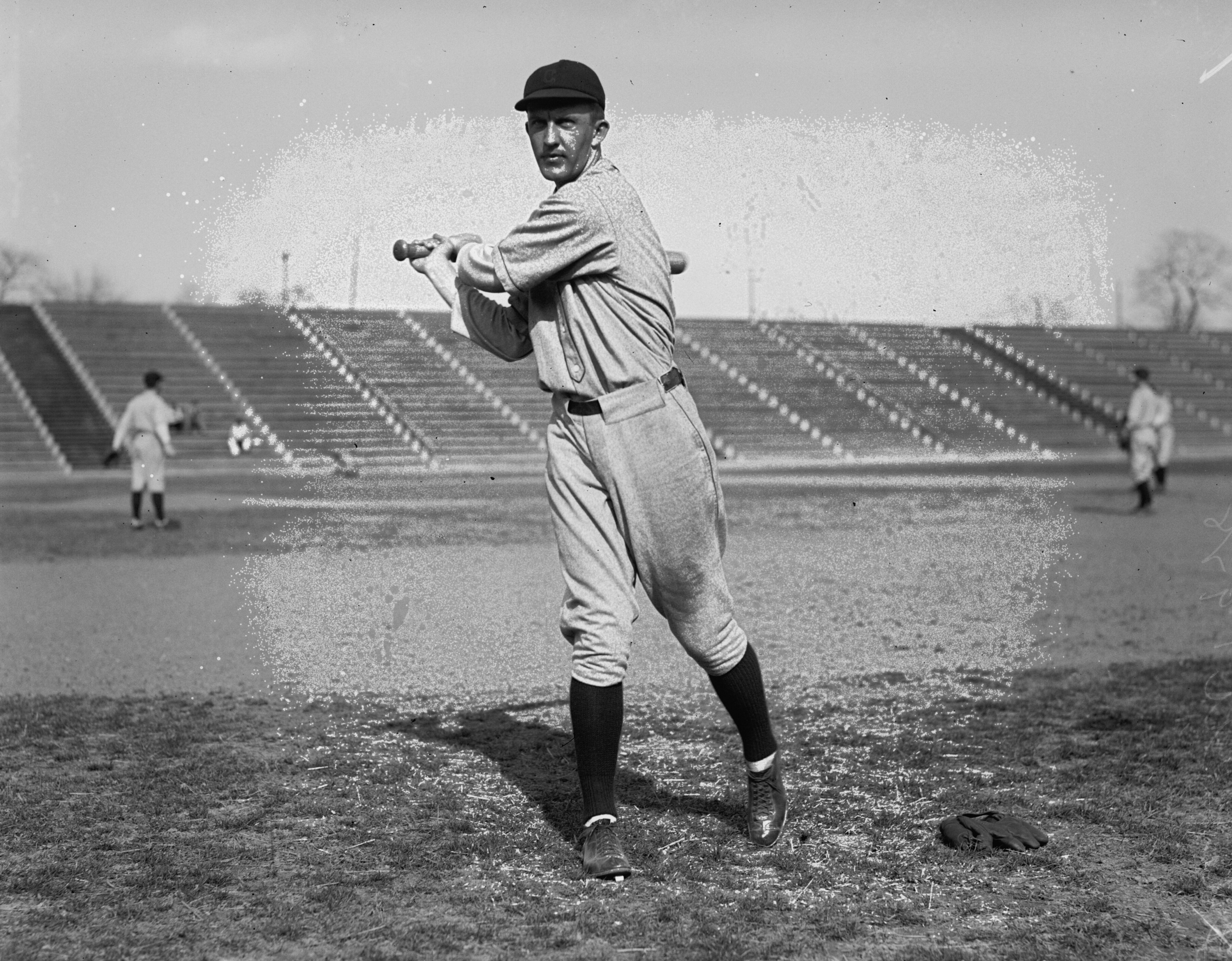
Foley in 1928

Raymond Kirwin Foley (June 23, 1906 – March 22, 1980) was an American baseball player who appeared in two games for the 1928 New York Giants of Major League Baseball (MLB). Listed at 5 feet 11 inches (1.80 m) and 173 pounds (78 kg), he batted left-handed and threw right-handed.

== Biography ==
Foley attended Catholic University of America in Washington, D.C., where he played football, basketball, and baseball. He played on each sport's freshman team, then was on the varsity of each squad for three years, earning a total of nine varsity letters; during his senior year, he was the captain of the football and baseball teams. An outfielder on the baseball team, he was signed by the New York Giants in June 1928, the same month that he graduated.

Foley played in two games for the Giants during the 1928 season, his only major league appearances. His first appearance was on July 4, in the first game of a home doubleheader against the Brooklyn Robins. In the bottom of the seventh inning, with Brooklyn leading, 7–1, Foley pinch hit for pitcher Tiny Chaplin. With a runner on first base and no outs, Foley struck out facing Brooklyn pitcher Dazzy Vance. Foley did not play defensively, as he was replaced by pitcher Dutch Henry. On July 18, the Giants released Foley in order to add rookie pitcher Carl Hubbell to their roster. When Foley re-joined the Giants is unclear, as he made a second appearance on September 10, in the second game of a road doubleheader versus the Boston Braves. In the top of the seventh inning, with the Giants leading, 7–0, Foley again pinch hit, this time for catcher Shanty Hogan. With runners on second and third with one out, Foley drew a walk against Braves' pitcher Foster Edwards, loading the bases. Foley advanced to second base on a ground out, then scored on a single. He again did not play defensively, as he was replaced by catcher Bob O'Farrell. In January 1929, the Giants sent Foley to the minor league Bridgeport Bears of the Eastern League. However, Foley does not appear in the statistical summary of Bridgeport's 1929 season.

By October 1940, Foley was married and working for the board of education in his hometown of Naugatuck, Connecticut. He was inducted to the athletics hall of fame at Catholic University in 1977. Foley died in March 1980 in Vero Beach, Florida, and was interred in Naugatuck. He was survived by his wife, two sons, and two daughters.

== Notes ==
Minor league experience is absent from Foley's summary at Baseball-Reference.com. While that site has two entries of "Ray Foley" minor league statistics, those records include professional games during 1926 and 1927, when Foley was still playing for Catholic University.
