= York Peppermint Pattie =

Peppermint confection made by Hershey

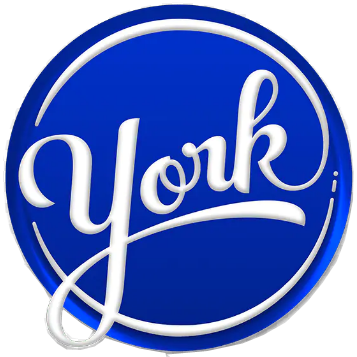

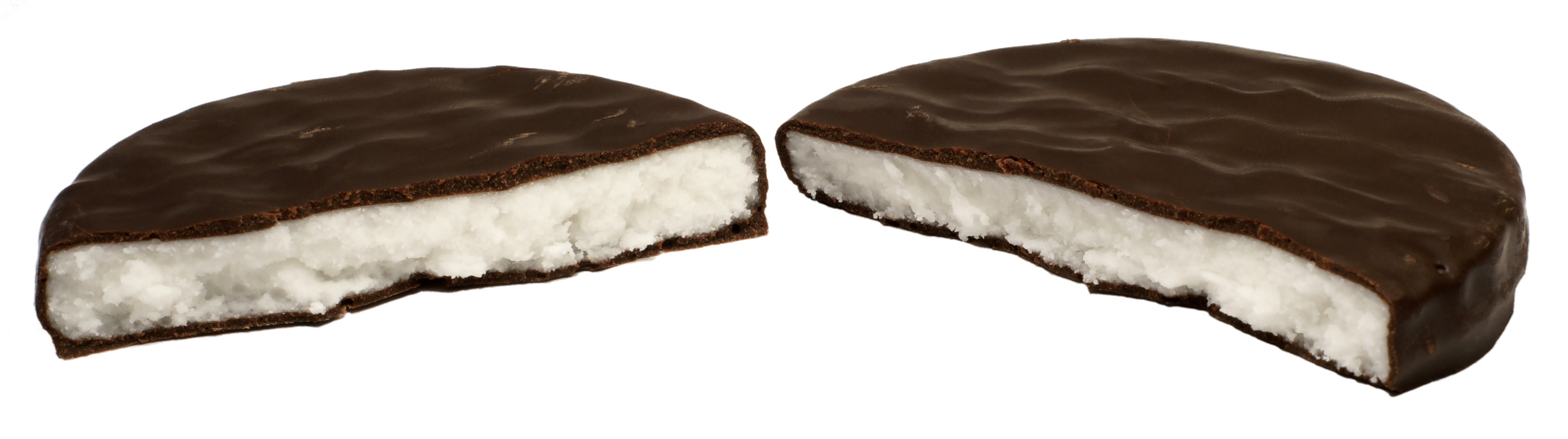
- A circular pattie with a soft mint center coated in dark chocolate.
- Product type: Confectionery
- Current owner: The Hershey Company
- Country: United States
- Introduced: 1940; 86 years ago
- Related brands: York Miniatures
- Markets: United States; United Kingdom; Canada
- Tagline: Get The York Sensation; Get The Sensation
- Website: hersheyland.com/york

York Peppermint Pattie is an American dark chocolate enrobed peppermint confection introduced in 1940 and currently produced by the Hershey Company.

== History ==
About 1920, Henry Kessler founded the York Cone Company Corporation on South Pine Street in York, Pennsylvania. The company originally sold ice cream cones and waffles before Kessler wanted to make a chocolate and mint themed candy. Although news articles commonly have it that the York Peppermint Pattie was first produced in York, Pennsylvania by Henry Kessler at his York Cone Company in 1940, a trademark application for “York Peppermint Pattie Mint (Candy)” filed by York Cone Company Corporation on February 10, 1949, shows a first use in commerce date of January 28, 1922, soon after the founding of the company. The trademark registration number 0564557 was awarded on September 30, 1952.

Although chocolate-covered peppermints already existed before the York Peppermint Pattie came on the market, the York differed in that it was firmer and crisp, while the competition was softer and gooier. A former employee and York resident, Phil Kollin, remembered the final test that sample patties went through before leaving the factory: "It was a snap test. If the candy didn't break clean in the middle, it was a second."

The business expanded sales beyond the local market and without consumer advertising the York Peppermint Pattie was being sold in the Northeast, parts of the Midwest and in Florida.

On August 22, 1966, Charles M. Schulz introduced a character named Peppermint Patty to the Peanuts comic strip.

In 1972, the York Cone Company was acquired by Peter Paul, who then launched the York Peppermint Patties nationally in 1975.

Peter Paul then merged with Cadbury for $27.50 per share, a total of $58 million in 1978.

In August 1988, Hershey acquired the US confectionery operations of Cadbury Schweppes which included the Almond Joy, Mounds and York Peppermint Pattie business. The purchase price was $284.5 million plus an assumption of $30 million in debt, and it included licensing arrangements for Almond Joy, Mounds, York Peppermint Pattie, and certain Cadbury brands in the US market.

In 2009, after 23 years in the Reading plant, the production of the York Peppermint Pattie moved from Reading, Pennsylvania, to Mexico.

== Promotion ==
During the 1970s, Peter Paul launched a memorable advertising campaign for the candy with the tagline "Get the Sensation" which continues to be used in the present day. A TV commercial in 1979 included the “Get The Sensation” theme.

In the fall of 1982, Peter Paul launched an advertising campaign using an “I Love New York” theme to promote adding 10% more chocolate to the candy.

National Peppermint Patty Day is celebrated each year on February 11.

== Product and variations ==
In the confectionery industry, enrobing is a process that involves covering a confection or snack with chocolate or chocolate coatings. The York Peppermint Pattie confection features strongly contrasting flavors, with a bittersweet dark chocolate surrounding a sugary center with a strong peppermint flavor.

Over time there have been a number of product variations such as the following:

- Sugar Free Peppermint Patties – a sugar-free version of the traditional Peppermint Pattie.
- Chocolate Truffle Mint – introduced in 2004, which had a brown filling.
- Limited Edition Pink Pattie – introduced in October 2005. Peppermint Pattie with pink filling. Sale proceeds are donated to breast cancer research through the Young Survival Coalition.
- York Mints – introduced in 2007, a tin filled with bite-sized mints that have a mint shell, chocolate on the inside, and more mint on the inside.
- York Peppermint Bites – Introduced in 2003. Bite sized, round shaped candy. Introduced with other Hershey flavors.
- Peppermint Batties – Bat-shaped Peppermint Patties made each year around Halloween. Replaced with Peppermint Patties Pumpkins in 2007.
- Peppermint Patties Pumpkins – introduced in October 2007 for Halloween. Pumpkin-shaped Peppermint Patties with orange filling.
- Peppermint Patties Miniature Hearts Heart Box – introduced for Valentine's Day. Heart-shaped patties in a heart-shaped box.
- Peppermint Pattie Snowflakes – for Christmas, snowflake-shaped Peppermint Patties.
- Egg-Shaped Patties – for Easter.
- York Chocolate Peppermint Pattie Easter Bunny

== See also ==
- Kendal Mint Cake
- Pearson's Mint Patties
- After Eight
