= United States Post Office–Naugatuck Main =

- US Post Office-Naugatuck Main
- U.S. National Register of Historic Places
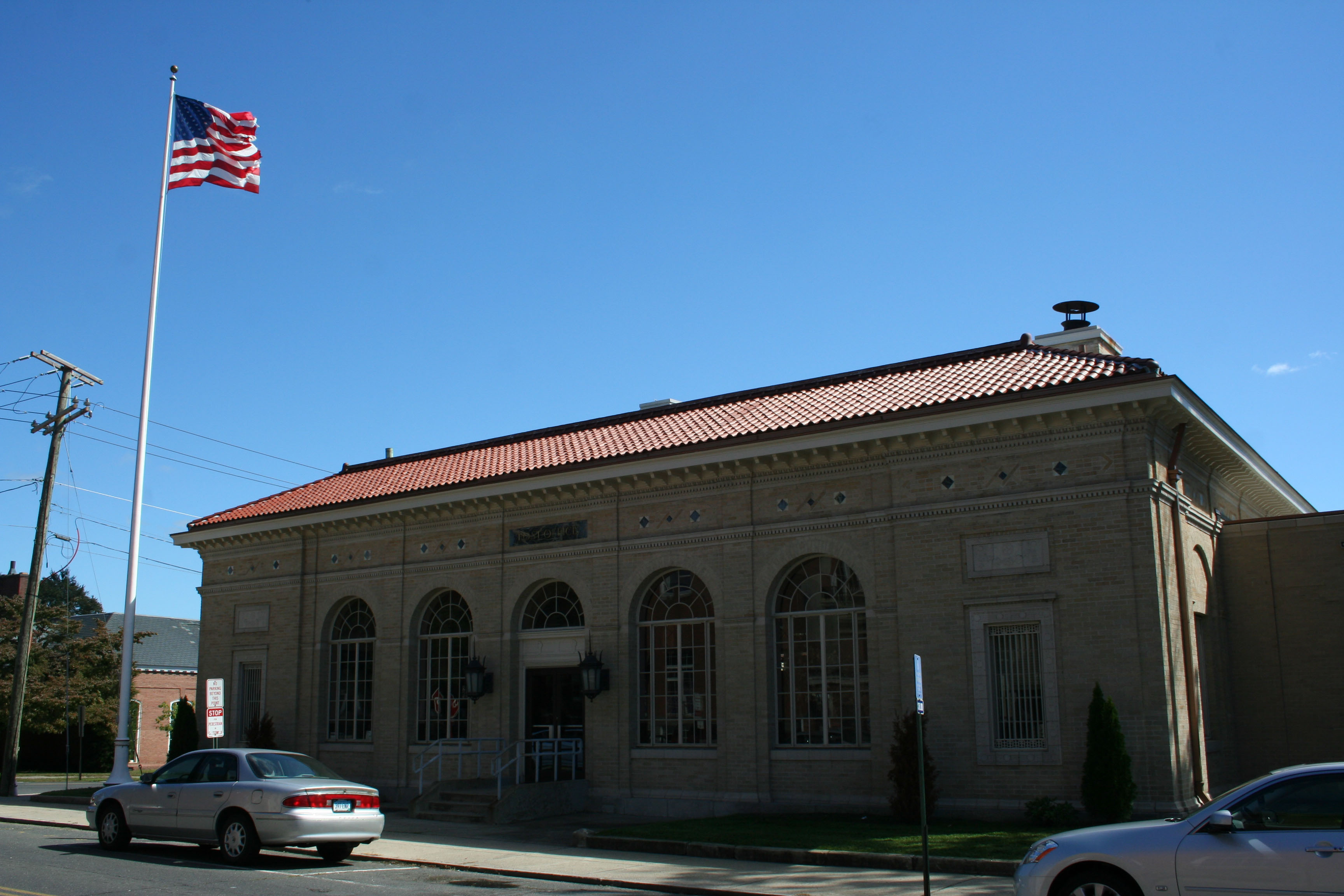
- U.S. Post Office-Naugatuck Main in 2012

- Location within Connecticut Location within the United States
- Location: Church and Cedar Streets, Naugatuck, Connecticut
- Coordinates: 41°29′32″N 73°3′23″W
- Area: 0.3 acres (0.12 ha)
- Built: 1915
- Architect: Wetmore, James A.
- Architectural style: Mediterranean Revival
- NRHP reference No.: 86000130
- Added to NRHP: January 21, 1986

The U.S. Post Office-Naugatuck Main, also known as Naugatuck Main Post Office, is a historic former post office building at Church and Cedar Streets in Naugatuck, Connecticut. Designed in 1915 and completed the following year, it is one of the most architecturally sophisticated post office buildings in the state. It is set among a cluster of civic buildings designed by McKim, Meade & White. The building was listed on the National Register of Historic Places in 1986. Naugatuck's current post office is located at 170 Water Street.

== Description and history ==
Naugatuck's former main post office is located North of the Town Green, at the Southeast Corner of Church and Cedar Streets. It is a single-story masonry structure, its original main block finished in buff brick trimmed with terra cotta and marble, and covered by a hipped red tile roof. A later 20th-century addition extends to its rear; it has a frame of steel and concrete, but is finished with similar materials and covered by a flat roof. The main facade is dominated by five large round-arch openings, with the four outer ones housing windows that flank the main entrance in the center bay. A frieze dotted with terra cotta and marble inlays extends below the bracketed cornice.

The building was one of the first of forty-five post offices built by the federal government in 1916. The government had just produced a set of standards governing the size, scale, and architecture of post office buildings based on the size and importance of the community. Naugatuck was at the time a highly successful industrial community (home to Charles Goodyear's United States Rubber Company aka Uniroyal), and its center had recently been graced by the sophisticated architectural contributions of McKim, Meade & White. The city was consequently given a post office building of somewhat more elegance than was typically found in communities of similar size.

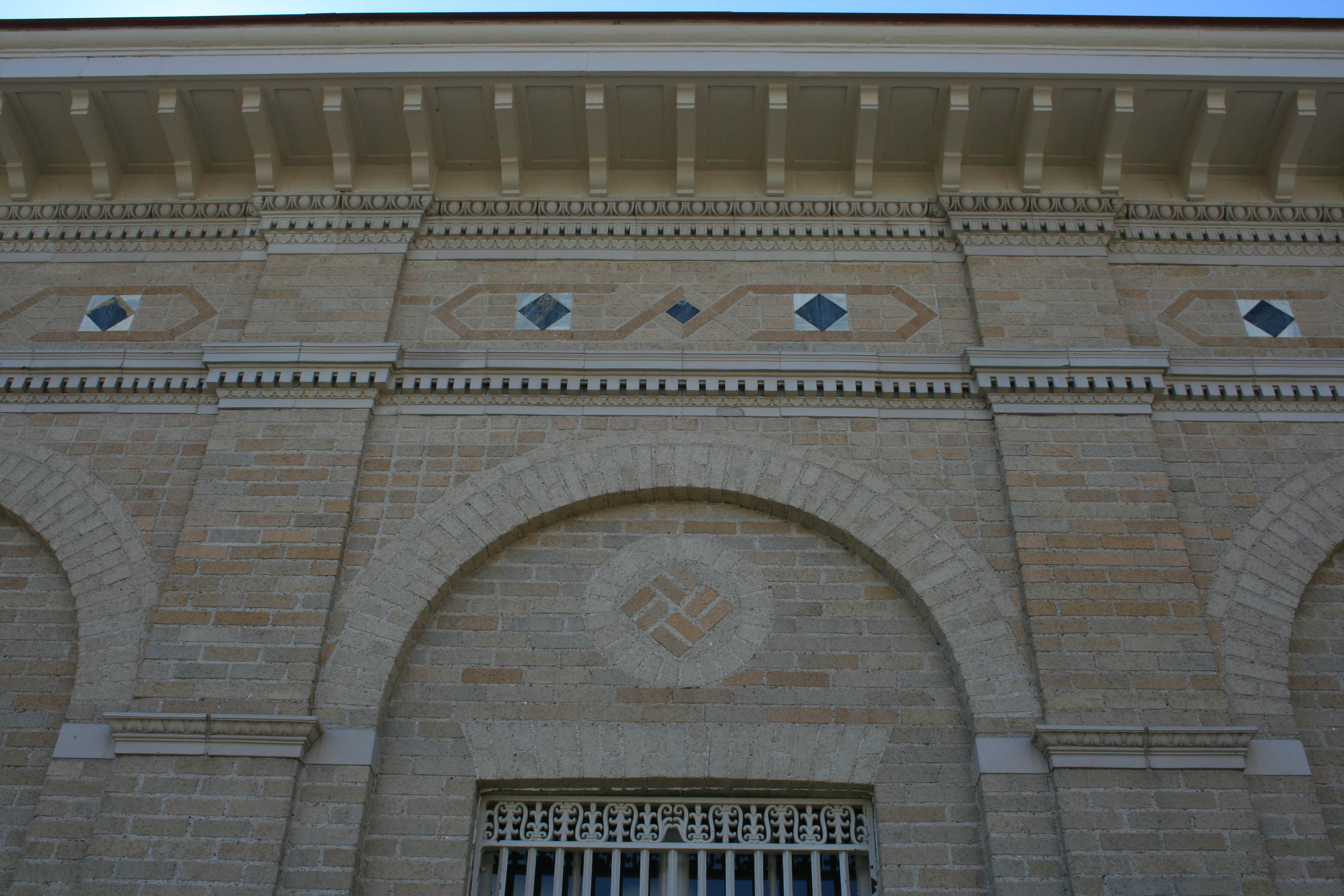
Masonry at North Elevation

== See also ==
- National Register of Historic Places listings in New Haven County, Connecticut
- List of United States post offices
