= St. Hedwig Parish, Union City =

Coordinates: 41°30′10.5″N 73°02′39.8″W

St. Hedwig Parish
- St. Hedwig Parish
- Location: 32 Golden Hill Street; Union City, Connecticut
- Country: United States
- Denomination: Roman Catholic

History
- Founded: February 18, 1906
- Founder: Polish immigrants
- Dedication: St. Hedwig
- Dedicated: June 2, 1907

Administration
- Division: Vicariate: Waterbury
- Province: Hartford
- Archdiocese: Hartford

Clergy
- Archbishop: Most Rev. Christopher J. Coyne

St. Hedwig Parish - designated for Polish immigrants in Union City, Connecticut, United States.

Founded on February 18, 1906. It is one of the Polish-American Roman Catholic parishes in New England in the Archdiocese of Hartford.

== History ==
On February 14, 1906, Bishop Michael Tierney dispatched Fr. Ignacy Maciejewski as the first Polish pastor in Union City. Fr. Maciejewski celebrated the first parish Mass at Sokolowski Hall on February 18, 1906. By the year's end, a Polish church was built and formally dedicated on June 2, 1907.

The parish was linked with nearby St. Mary Parish in 2006. It was announced in April, 2017 that the parish was closing. The last Mass in the building was held on June 29, 2017 at 6PM. The building was sold to Bais Yaakov of Waterbury girls high school.

== Bibliography ==
- The 150th Anniversary of Polish-American Pastoral Ministry. Webster, Massachusetts: St. Joseph Basilica. September 11, 2005.
- The Official Catholic Directory in USA
