= Mounds (candy bar) =

Candy bar by Hershey

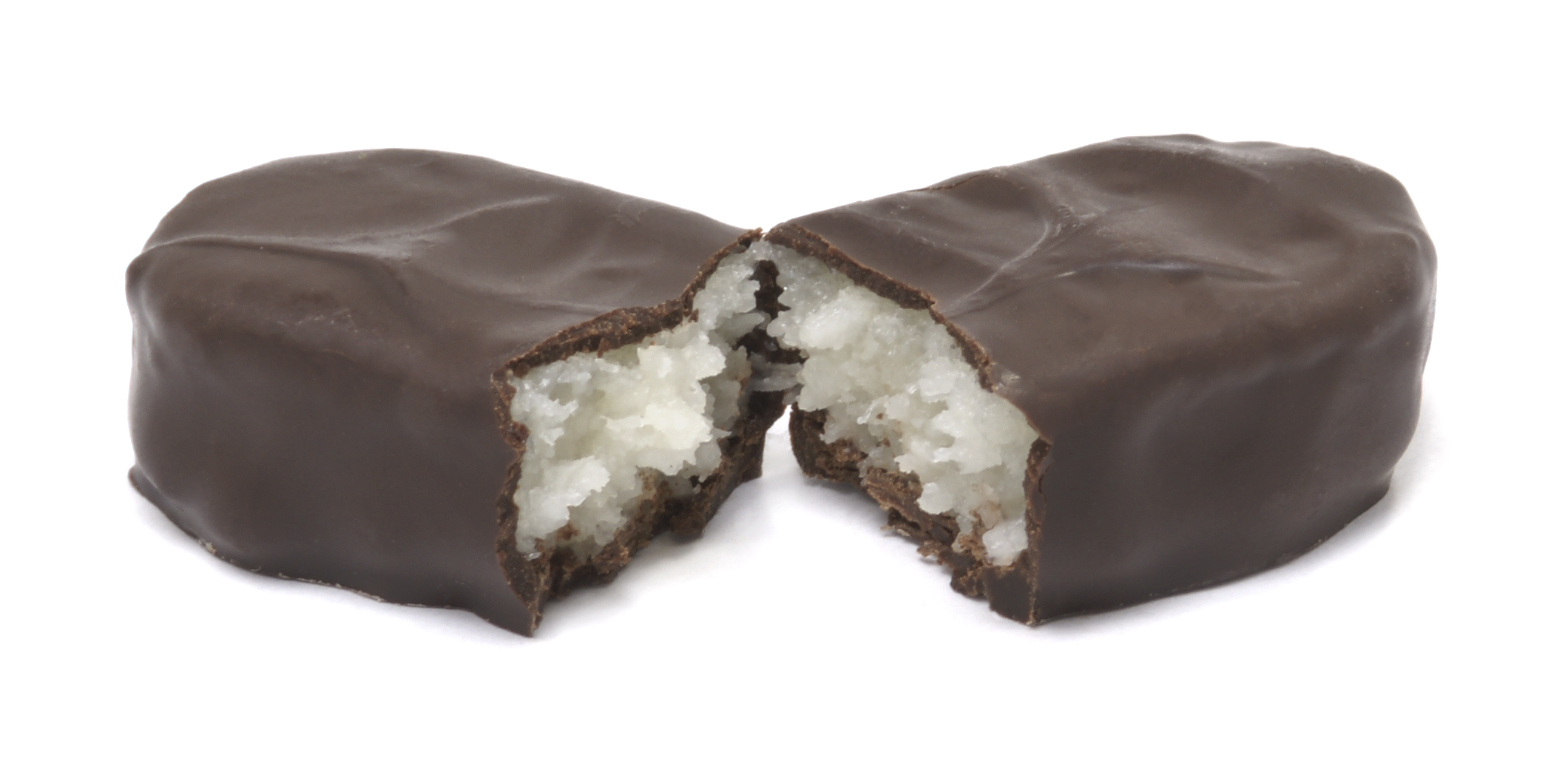
- A candy bar with shredded coconut covered in dark chocolate.
- Product type: Coconut candy bar
- Current owner: The Hershey Company
- Produced by: The Hershey Company
- Country: United States
- Introduced: 1920; 106 years ago
- Related brands: Almond Joy
- Markets: United States
- Previous owners: Peter Paul Co.; Cadbury
- Tagline: Indescribably Delicious. Unwrap Paradise.
- Website: hersheyland.com/mounds

Mounds is a candy bar made by the Hershey Company, consisting of shredded, sweetened coconut coated in dark chocolate. The company also produces Almond Joy, a similar candy bar topped by whole almonds and covered in milk chocolate. The two products share common packaging and logo design, with Mounds using a red color scheme and Almond Joy blue.

== History ==
The Mounds bar was originally invented in 1920 by Harry Tatigian, an experienced candy maker from Bridgeport, Connecticut who had been hired by the Peter Paul Candy Manufacturing Company two years earlier, and chemist George Shamlian, the company's vice president. (Note: At least one account attributes the candy's invention to Vincent Nitido, of West Haven, Connecticut, in 1920, and claims he later sold the candy to the Peter Paul company in 1929. This is unlikely, as almost all sources published prior to 2020 credit the Mounds bar's creation to Tatigian and Shamlian. Additionally, the Peter Paul company filed for the "Mounds" trademark on January 3, 1921.) Their coconut and dark chocolate formulation remains largely unchanged today. The name comes from the shape, the candy being a "mound" of coconut. The bars, originally sold for 5 cents each, were individually rolled, flattened, shaped, dipped in chocolate, and wrapped in foil, entirely by hand. Mounds proved extremely popular, and by 1922, the increased demand meant the company was in need of larger headquarters and better equipment. The company relocated from New Haven and built a new plant in Naugatuck, Connecticut.

The candy's rapidly growing popularity also meant they were soon in competition on the national level with some of the most famous candy producers of the era; most notably the Oh Henry! bar from the Williamson Candy Company, the Baby Ruth from Curtiss Candy Company, both in Chicago, and the Milky Way from the Mars Company in Minneapolis. Recognizing they could no longer produce the bars by hand, the Peter Paul Company adapted a machine used for wrapping bars of soap to handle the candy, and moved to a production line method.

In 1932, during the economic downturn of the Great Depression, while many other candy manufacturers around the country cut back on product quality in order to stay afloat, and others were forced to close down entirely, Peter Paul instead made the unusual decision to not only retain their products' quality, but also to double the size of the Mounds bar, now selling two bars in one package, at the same price of 5 cents, in the hopes that such a bargain would be too good for consumers to ignore. They also switched from tin foil to cellophane packaging to improve sales appeal. This gamble proved extremely successful; just two years later the company built a $60,000 dollar extension to the plant to meet demand, invested in yet more new machinery, and introduced a new candy bar called "Dreams", a milk chocolate version of the Mounds. By 1935, Peter Paul had become the largest consumer of coconut in the world.

During World War II, Peter Paul was faced with severe shortages of sugar and coconut, which had been shipped from the Philippines before war broke out. The company instead began sourcing coconut from the Caribbean using its own fleet of small vessels for transportation of coconut supplies to the United States. Nicknamed the "Flea Fleet", these seven ships were small enough to avoid detailed scrutiny by German naval vessels operating in the Caribbean and yet carried sufficient supply of coconut to keep Peter Paul in operation during the war. Rather than sacrifice quality, the company discontinued some of its lesser selling brands and concentrated production on the Mounds candy bar. Over the years, Peter Paul added several products to its line, including the Almond Joy candy bar (1946) and York Peppermint Patties (1972). Cadbury and Peter Paul merged in 1978, and Hershey Foods purchased the company's U.S. operations in 1988.

Mounds, Almond Joy, and other Peter Paul confections were manufactured in Naugatuck, Connecticut, from the early 1920s until 2007. In 1950, Peter Paul Candy Manufacturing Company built a larger plant in Naugatuck to produce its confections. Following its acquisition of Mounds and Almond Joy in 1988, The Hershey Company continued to manufacture Mounds and Almond Joy at the Peter Paul plant, before moving the manufacturing operation to a more modern plant in Stuarts Draft, Virginia, in 2007. At the time of the move, the 250,000 square foot Naugatuck plant was operating at 40% capacity.

In 2006, a limited-edition Mounds Island Orange candy bar was briefly produced, featuring bright orange colored coconut filling, which was also orange flavored.

== Advertising ==
Mounds' original slogan, "Indescribably Delicious", was created when Mounds ran a contest to come up with the best two words to sell the candy. Leon Weiss, who came up with the slogan, won $10. Peter Paul, Inc. filed a trademark application for the phrase on February 20, 1964, claiming a date of first use on June 15, 1956. The trademark registration date was August 3, 1965. Mounds continues to use the slogan in advertising and on the wrapper.

Mounds uses a packaging and logo design similar to its sister product, with Almond Joy's blue replaced by red, and the two candies are often advertised together. The candy's 1970s ad campaign used a jingle, "Sometimes you feel like a nut / sometimes you don't / Almond Joy's got nuts / Mounds don't", written by Joey Levine.

== Similar products ==
The Bounty bar is a similar product manufactured by Mars. On his 2001 album One Foot in the Gravy, John Shuttleworth extols the cardboard tray in the Mounds bar, which is absent in the Bounty.
