= Limited edition candy =

Confectionery sold for a limited time period

Limited Edition (LE) candy is specialized candy manufactured for a limited time period, typically eight to twelve weeks. Limited-edition as a candy marketing strategy was first used in 2003; by August 2005, more than 60 limited-edition candy varieties had been marketed.

Hershey's Dark Kisses (released as limited-edition in July 2003), Kit Kat White Chocolate, and Reese's White Chocolate were eventually made permanent due to customer demand.

LE candy are often used for cross-promotion with films.

Some believe that LE candy merely builds upon base brand sales; others believe in the long-run that they "cannibalize base brand sales."

Some vendors, notably Six Flags, are reluctant to carry LE candy, preferring "proven sellers."
