= Laurel Park Incorporated =

Coordinates: 41.4769°N 73.0705°W

The Laurel Park, Inc. site, also known as Hunters Mountain Dump, or Murtha's Dump to locals, is a capped landfill that occupies approximately 20 acres (81,000 m^{2}) of a 35-acre (140,000 m^{2}) parcel of land in Naugatuck, Connecticut, United States. The landfill has been in existence since the late 1940s, and several industries disposed of solvents, oils, hydrocarbons, chemical and liquid sludge, chemical solids, tires, and rubber products there. The facility continued to operate as a municipal landfill until 1987. It was owned and operated by Terrence and Howard Murtha.

== Description ==
The centrally developed portion of the Town of Naugatuck, which has an estimated population of 31,000 people, is located approximately 1-mile (1.6 km) northeast of the site. Homes are located around three sides of the landfill. Approximately 50 homes are located within a 1/4-mile (0.40 km) of the site, with the closest residents located approximately 1,000 feet (300 m) from the site. The nearest homes used groundwater from private wells as a drinking water source, but have since been connected to the public water supply. The homes at the bottom of Huntington Hill, downslope of the landfill, are served by a public water supply line. Most of the area immediately bordering the site is forested.

The maximum depth of the landfill is about 115 feet (35 m). The bedrock is shallow, and leachate was visible on all major slopes at the landfill. Leachate sampling at the base of the refuse slope confirmed the presence of toxic organic chemicals. In addition, various inorganic contaminants were measured in the unnamed tributary north of the site.

This site was first listed under the name "Laurel Park Landfill." It is the top priority site in Connecticut.

== Site history ==
The site was in operation from 1949 to 1987. In the 1960s the site was excavated in some areas to bedrock. According to a 1972 Inventory of clients serviced by the landfill conducted by the CT DEP, 107,000 short tons (97,000 t) of solid waste and 46 short tons (42 t) of liquid waste were disposed of per year at the Laurel Park Landfill. These include rubber products, tires, chemicals, oils, solvents, chemical solids and municipal wastes. In the late 1980s the landfill accepted approximately 200 short tons (180 t) per day of municipal and industrial wastes.

The landfill was known to have operational problems. Fires were common, the facility used fly ash as a cover which was inadequate to prevent litter from being blown off-site. Spills on the roads leading to the landfill were common according to local residents. In addition, local residents reported seeing leachate flowing into an unnamed creek along Andrew Avenue. Leachate is produced by rain percolating into the ground and coming into contact with contaminated waste buried in the landfill. Leachate overflow has been a problem at the site. In the late 1980s, leachate collected in the leachate system overflowed a manhole on the Laurel Park site entering a stream that passes by several residences and a school playground. Tests of the leachate and the stream revealed the presence of hazardous substances, including benzene, toluene, and ethyl benzene.

In the early 1970s, the CT Department of Public Health recommended steps to eliminate the migration of contaminants into surface waters. A sand filter was installed in response to CT Department of Public Health recommendations on the western edge of the site in the mid-1970s.

In the early 1980s, monitoring of residential wells in the vicinity of Laurel Park found that some wells had contaminants believed to be site related. As a result, residences were provided with bottled water in 1983 by Laurel Park, Inc., and subsequently by the CT DEP until 1990 when the majority of the residences near the landfill were connected to the public water supply.

In 1983 the CT DEP and Laurel Park Inc. entered into a stipulated judgement which required:

1. the installation of monitoring wells
2. the construction of a leachate collection system
3. delivery of bottled water to affected homeowners.

The judgement also allowed the landfill to be used for disposal of municipal waste only. In 1983, a leachate collection system was constructed to convey wastes off-site into the Naugatuck municipal waste water treatment plant. However, it was not hooked up until 1989. The CT DEP did not allow the collection system to flow into the municipal sewers until an additional separate leachate line was installed in December 1989.

On October 13, 1983, the CT DEP issued a cease and desist order prohibiting the operation of the landfill based on the detection of 2,3,7,8-tetra-chloro-p-dioxin (TCDD) in an onsite monitoring well. Later sampling and analyses did not detect the presence of this contaminant. As a result, the landfill was allowed to reopen and accept municipal waste.

In 1986, a preliminary health assessment was performed by ATSDR which concluded that surface runoff and leachate associated with the site posed a potential public health threat to residents near the site.

In May 1988, an Addendum to the Health Assessment was released. ATSDR reviewed a list of proposed alternatives for remediation to determine which of them were adequate for the protection of public health.

The landfill was closed in 1987.

In 1989, the U.S. Environmental Protection Agency ordered the owners of the landfill to construct a sewer line connecting the leachate collection system to the Naugatuck Municipal Sewage Treatment Plant. The sewer line was installed to alleviate the serious problem of the overflow of contaminated leachate from a manhole on the Laurel Park site. This sewer line discharges into the Naugatuck municipal sewage treatment plant.

== Contamination at the site ==
Soil contaminants taken at the site include dioxins and dioxin-like compounds, benzene, butane, chloroform, ethylbenzene, methane, methyl ethyl ketone, pentane, and toluene. Many of these chemicals are highly toxic carcinogens that are known to cause cancer. No air testing has been conducted. Now that the landfill cap and leachate collection have been completed, there are no threats of contamination due to surface contact.

As of September 2008 in the site's latest Five-Year-Review Report, the US EPA raised concerns that the current leachate system is not catching all contaminates, and that contaminants may be migrating off-site either into the Unnamed brook that runs behind Andrew Avenue School, or into the bedrock and discharging into groundwater. Groundwater flows northwest and south from the site. The main cause for concern would be residences on Hunters Mountain that are not hooked up to the public water line.

Another cause for concern noted by the US EPA is a 200-home development proposed by Primrose Companies of Bridgeport, CT adjacent to Hunters Mountain Road and Andrew Mountain Road. The proposed southern portion of the development abuts the landfill perimeter, and Laurel Park, Inc. has proposed that houses close to the landfill must use passive foundation ventilation systems to mitigate residents from coming in contact with contaminants or gas from the landfill.

== Superfund status ==
The site was elevated to top Superfund priority status in 1983 after an initial investigation by the CT DEP found that dioxin was in the soil.

== Cleanup ==
There has been a significant amount of community concern and interest in the site since the early years of landfill operations when open burning occurred. An organized citizens group was very active in the 1980s and played a role in the final landfill closure.

A leachate system was built in 1987, but not hooked up to the municipal water system until 1989, causing leachate to overflow into a stream into the brook behind Andrew Avenue Elementary School.

In 1997 the landfill was finally capped, and in 1998 the leachate system was upgraded.

== See also ==
- Landfill in the United States
