= Laurel Park, Richmond, California =

Coordinates: 37.923°N 122.326°W

Laurel Park is a neighborhood in Richmond, California. It has its own neighborhood council, which has sent at least one president to the at large city council. The current president is Myrtle Braxton.
