= Almond Joy =

Candy bar

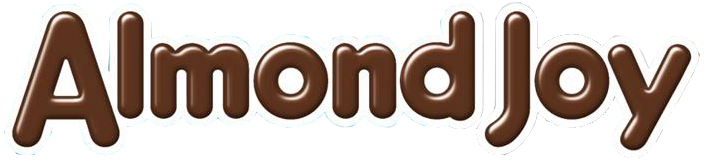

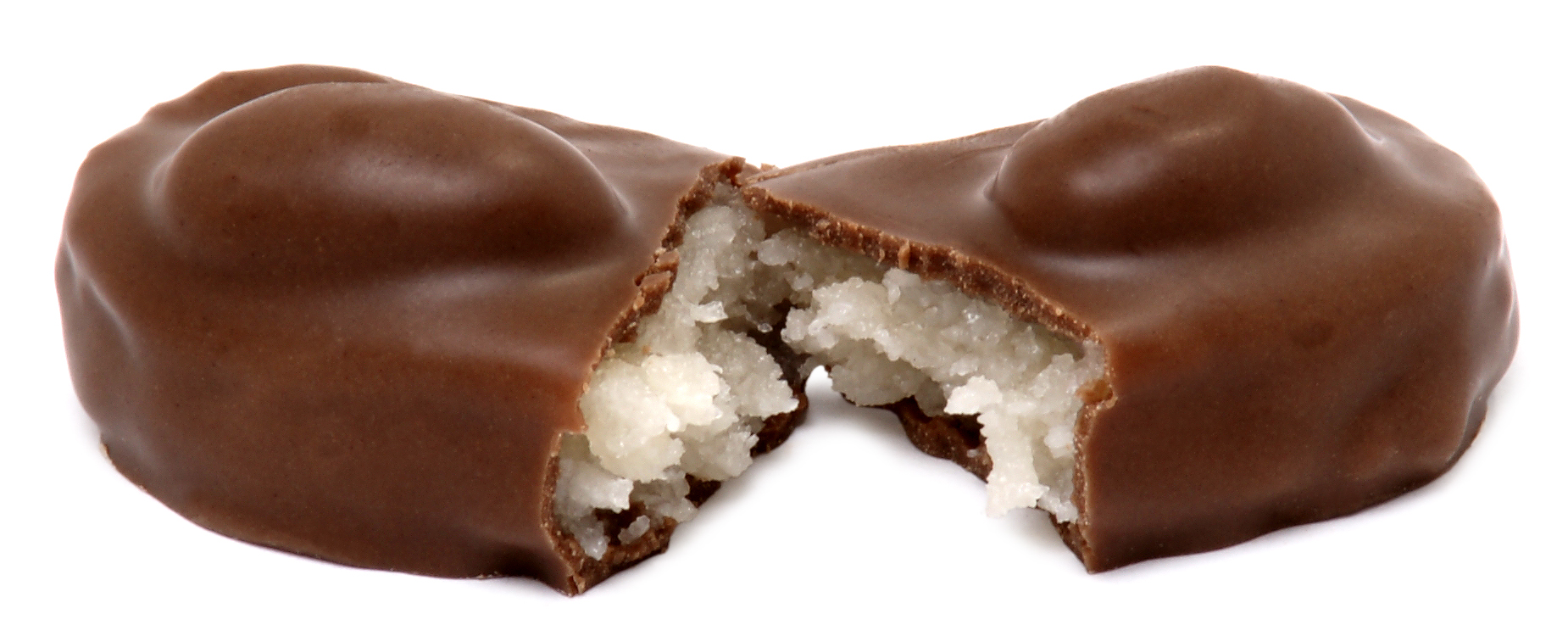
- A candy bar with shredded coconut and almonds covered in smooth chocolate candy.
- Product type: Candy Bar
- Produced by: The Hershey Company
- Country: United States
- Introduced: 1946; 80 years ago
- Related brands: Mounds
- Previous owners: Peter Paul; Cadbury-Schweppes
- Tagline: Sometimes you feel like a nut, sometimes you don't.
- Website: hersheyland.com/almond-joy

Almond Joy Nutrition Facts
- Type: Candy bar
- Food energy (per serving): 220 kcal (920 kJ)
Nutritional value
(per serving)
- Protein: 2 g
- Fat: 13 g
- Carbohydrate: 26 g
- Similar dishes: Mounds (candy)
- Other information: Nutritional information source:

Almond Joy is a candy bar manufactured by The Hershey Company, consisting of sweetened, shredded coconut topped with whole almonds and covered in milk chocolate. The company also produces Mounds bars, a similar confection without nuts, coated in dark chocolate.

The two bars have the same packaging and logo design, with a blue color scheme for Almond Joy and red for Mounds.

== History ==
The Peter Paul Candy Manufacturing Company was founded by six Armenian immigrants, including Peter Paul Halajian and Max Freedman, in 1919. In 1929, the company acquired the Mounds bar candy line from West Haven, Connecticut, candy maker Vincent Nitido. The Mounds bar became a hit with the U.S. military during World War II, who by 1944 purchased 80% of their production for use in rations (5 million bars/month). The Almond Joy bar was introduced in 1946 as a replacement for the Dreams Bar, which was introduced in 1934, consisting of diced almonds and coconut covered with dark chocolate. In 1978, Peter Paul merged with the Cadbury-Schweppes company of England. In 1988, Hershey's purchased the United States rights to their chocolate business for $300 million, which included the Mounds, Almond Joy, and York Peppermint Pattie brands, in addition to Cadbury-only products such as Dairy Milk and Caramello. The name "Almond Joy" was selected by Peter Paul employee Anna Z. Ranaudo from Naugatuck, Connecticut.

The Hershey Company made Almond Joy in Naugatuck, Connecticut, for nearly 20 years before moving the manufacturing operation to a more modern plant in Stuarts Draft, Virginia, in 2007. At the time of the move, the 250,000 square foot Naugatuck plant was operating at 40% capacity.

== Advertising ==
During the 1970s, Peter Paul used the jingle, "Sometimes you feel like a nut / Sometimes you don't", written by Joey Levine, to advertise Almond Joy and Mounds in tandem. The TV commercial was first aired in January 1977. In a play on words, the "feel like a nut" portion of the jingle was typically played over a clip of someone acting like a "nut", i.e., doing something unconventional, such as an equestrian riding on a horse backward or a bride carrying her groom over the threshold.

== Product variations ==
In the 2000s, Hershey began producing variations of the product, including a limited-edition Piña Colada and Double Chocolate Almond Joy in 2004, a limited-edition White Chocolate Key Lime and Milk Chocolate Passion Fruit Almond Joy in 2005, and a limited-edition Toasted Coconut Almond Joy in 2006. Hershey's Swoops were also produced in an Almond Joy variety in 2004. In 2009, Hershey's came out with an Almond Joy Pieces product that was similar in size to M&Ms, but contained the coconut, milk chocolate, and almonds ingredients in brown, white and blue colors. Although well received, Almond Joy Pieces were later discontinued, along with York Pieces and Special Dark Pieces, leaving only the Reese's Pieces left on sale today. In 2026, Hershey's announced the release of Almond Joy ice cream bars and Breyers Almond Joy pints.

== See also ==
- List of almond dishes
