= H. Barber and Sons =

Manufacturer of beach-cleaning equipment

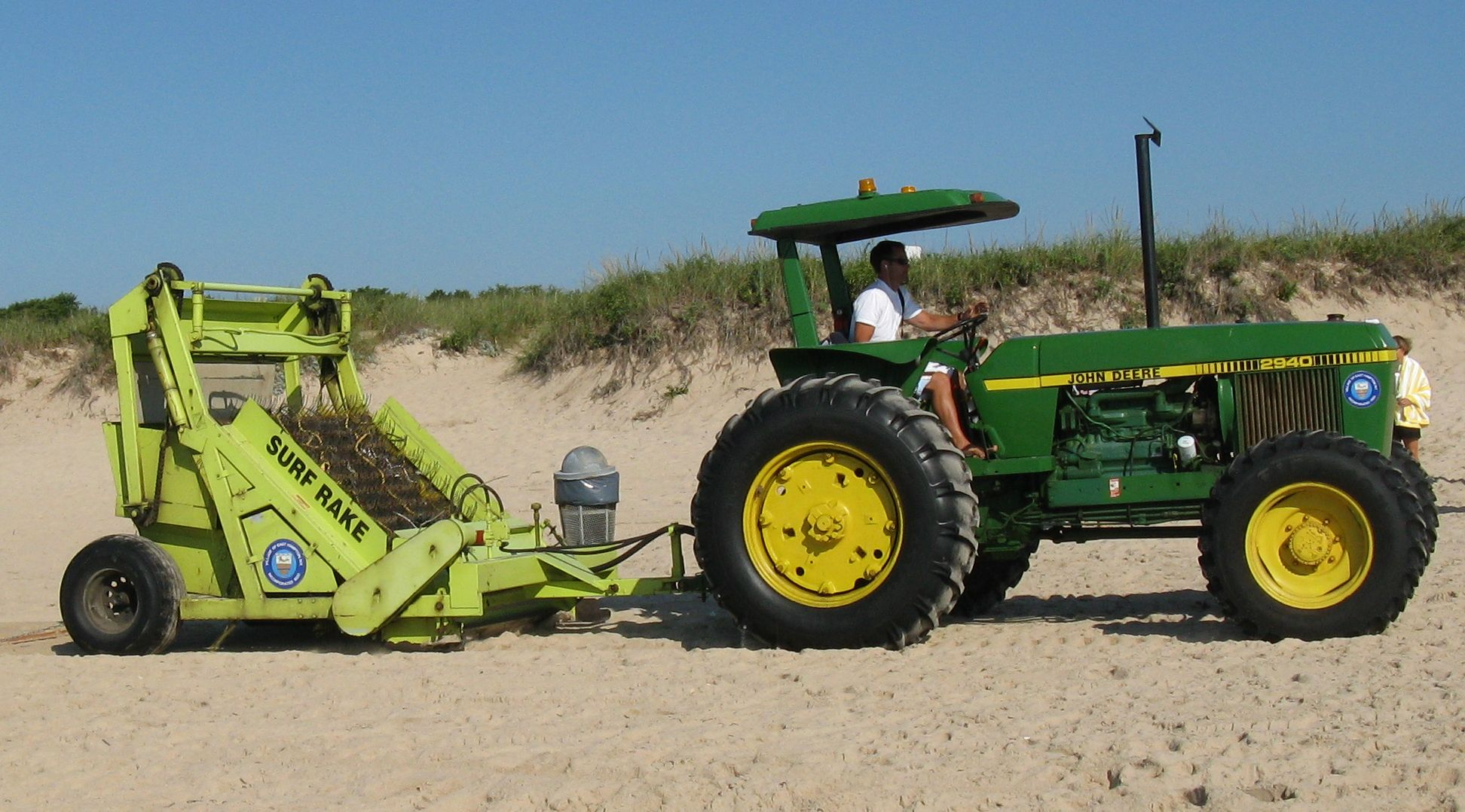
Barber Surf Rake in East Hampton

H. Barber & Sons is a privately owned Naugatuck, Connecticut-based company that has sold more beach cleaning equipment than any other company in the world.

Its rakes are used on six continents and in over 90 countries.

The company was founded by Harold S. Barber in the 1960s after he invented the SURF RAKE Model 500 for grooming sand beaches. Barber now offers three models of SURF RAKE beach cleaners and two smaller sand-sifting units, the SAND MAN 850 and TT. Barber sand cleaners pick up debris including litter, seaweed and even oil tar balls and then level and give consistency to the groomed area.

The flagship of the company and largest rake is the Barber Surf Rake Model 600HD—up to nine (9) acres an hour with a seven (7) foot wide cleaning path.

Barber Rakes have also been expanded to include a Turf Rake to remove stones from soil and a Road Rake for remove debris from roads and highways.

The larger rakes are pulled behind tractors or pick up trucks, although the Barber Sand Man is a smaller self-propelled walk behind device that is used in golf course sand traps and playgrounds.
