= Young Survival Coalition =

International breast cancer organization

- Company type: Non-Profit
- Founded: 1998
- Founder: Robert Levy Schwartz; Joy Simha; Lanita Moss
- Headquarters: United States
- Key people: Desirée Walker (President); Jennifer Merschdorf (CEO); Stacy Lewis(Chief Program Officer & Deputy Chief Executive Officer)
- Revenue: 3,691,060 United States dollar (2017)
- Total assets: 2,342,391 United States dollar (2022)
- Website: youngsurvival.org

Young Survival Coalition (YSC) is an international organization focusing on young adults diagnosed with breast cancer ages 40 and under. Founded in 1998 by three young women with breast cancer, YSC is a 501(c)(3) non-profit based in the United States. It is currently led by board president Desirée A. H. Walker and CEO Jennifer Merschdorf.

== Philosophy ==
Approximately 13,000 women under the age of 40 are diagnosed with breast cancer annually. According to its mission statement, Young Survival Coalition focuses on the "critical issues unique to young women and breast cancer. YSC works with survivors, caregivers and the medical, research, advocacy and legislative communities to increase the quality and quantity of life for women diagnosed with breast cancer ages 40 and under." This includes lobbying, speaking engagements, conferences and an annual awareness campaign which educates members of the medical community about breast cancer's prevalence in younger women.

== Activities ==
=== Use of funds ===
YSC's 2013–2014 Expenses
1. Program Services (70.2%)
2. Management & General (18.2%)
3. Fundraising (11.6%)

In the 2013-2014 fiscal year, ending June 30, 2014, Young Survival Coalition reported approximately US$4.78 million in earnings. Of this, US$4.69 million came from contributions and grants, with $.95 million coming from other revenue.

That same fiscal year, YSC reported approximately US$4.56 million in expenses. Of this, approximately $3.2 million went to program services, $828,000 to management and general expenses, and $529,000 to fundraising expenses.

The Young Survival Coalition CEO salary in 2015 was $141,518 a year.
