= Peter Paul Candy Manufacturing Company =

American candy company

- Company type: Private
- Industry: Candy
- Founded: 1919; 107 years ago
- Founder: Peter Paul Halajian
- Headquarters: New Haven, Connecticut
- Products: Mounds candy bar, Almond Joy
- Parent: Cadbury Schweppes (1978-1988); The Hershey Company (1988-present)

The Peter Paul Candy Manufacturing Company is a candy-making division within the Hershey Company.

== History ==
Peter Paul was founded in New Haven, Connecticut, in 1919 by six Armenian immigrants led by Peter Paul Halajian, with a manufacturing plant in nearby Naugatuck, Connecticut.

The company's first product was the Konabar, consisting of chocolate-covered coconut, nuts, and fruit, which was fairly successful. In 1920, they purchased the rights to Knight's Knifty Knibbles, owned by Anita Grace Knight of Plainfield, New Jersey, and in 1921, introduced the renamed Mounds candy bar, which featured white sweetened coconut and dark chocolate.

Despite constant efforts to automate production and cut costs, the Great Depression threatened the $200 million U.S. candy market, and in 1932, they took a risk, retooling and repackaging Mounds in cellophane rather than tin foil for better sales appeal, and doubling the product's size, making it a twin bar for the same five-cent price. The gamble worked, and within 30 days, sales zoomed.

In 1934, the company built a $60,000 addition to the Naugatuck plant and invested still more in new machinery to meet demand, using earnings to pay for expansion without incurring debt. In the same year, the company introduced a new product, the Dreams candy bar, named by students participating in a contest at Naugatuck High School. It consisted of diced almonds and coconut covered with dark chocolate, becoming the forerunner of the Almond Joy bar. Around the same time, they introduced the "Main Show" bar, which consisted of milk chocolate, coconut, and peanut butter.

In February 1935, after increasing wages by as much as 20%, the company's stock split two for one, becoming a sensational story carried nationally by the Associated Press. Bucking the national trend, the company paid stockholders continuous quarterly dividends throughout the Depression.

By the late 1930s both Mounds and Dreams were ranked among the five top-selling candy bars in the United States, and Peter Paul had established its reputation “as the company that never knew the Depression”.

During World War II sugar and coconut shortages forced the company to abandon the Dreams bar in favor of concentrating on the better selling Mounds. Fortuitously, the Mounds became a hit with the U.S. military, which purchased 5 million bars per month (equivalent to 80% of their production) by 1944 for use in rations. It also sold caramels, and manufactured charcoal gum during the war because it used little sugar.

The Almond Joy bar was introduced in 1948, using milk chocolate instead of dark chocolate, and adding a double-toasted almond on top, sold in a blue package to differentiate it from the Mounds' red package, becoming an immediate success.

After successfully advertising on national radio in the 1930s, Peter Paul led the industry in the use of network television advertising in the early 1950s, with the Peter Paul Pixies singing that Mounds and Almond Joys were “Indescribably Delicious”, a slogan coined for a contest in 1955 by Leon Weiss of Gary, Indiana, who won $10. The company went on to become the first candy manufacturer to use full-color TV commercials.

In 1972, the company introduced a candy bar named for what it did not include rather than what it did, the 15-cent (Peanut Butter with) No Jelly bar, also called the Sidekick bar. In 1977, they changed the name to the 20-cent Peanut Butter Bar. It was discontinued in 1979.

Peter Paul acquired the York Cone Company in July 1972, gaining the successful York Peppermint Pattie, which had debuted in 1940. In 1978, Peter Paul was acquired for $58 million by Cadbury Schweppes, becoming the European confectionery's United States operation. In November 1978, Peter Paul Cadbury closed its Frankfort, Indiana manufacturing plant, and operations moved to Naugatuck. The Hershey Company purchased Peter Paul along with their entire U.S. chocolate business from Cadbury Schweppes for $300 million in 1988.

In April 2007, the Hershey Company announced it would close Peter Paul's Naugatuck plant. In November 2007, operations moved to Virginia.

== Products ==
- Konabar
- Mounds
- Dreams
- Almond Joy
- (Peanut Butter with) No Jelly
- York Peppermint Pattie
- Caramello
- Caravelle
- Power House
- Almond Cluster
