= Clara (given name) =

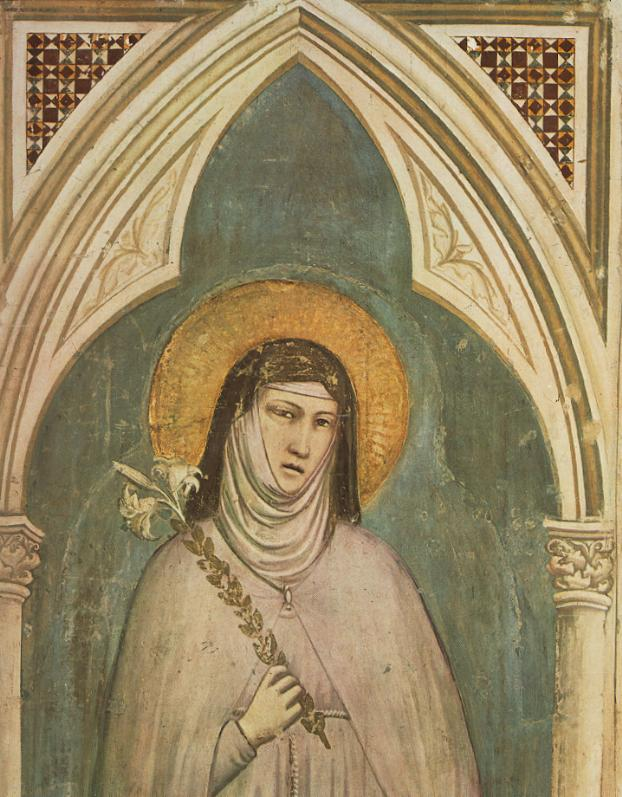
- Giotto di Bondone's fresco of Saint Clare of Assisi
- Gender: Unisex

Origin
- Origin: Latin
- Meaning: clear, bright, famous

Other names
- Related names: Clare, Clair/Claire, Clarissa, Klara

Clara or Klara is a given name. It is the feminine form of the Late Latin name Clarus which meant "clear, bright, famous". Various early male Christian saints were named Clarus; the feminine form became popular after the 13th-century Saint Clare of Assisi (called Chiara in Italian), one of the followers of Saint Francis, who renounced her privileged background and founded the order of Poor Clares. However, Clara is also a rare male name.

Clare was the main English form of the name used in the Middle Ages, but the Latin spelling Clara became more popular in the 19th century.

Glara is a related Kurdish name with a common origin, meaning "vision or brightness".

== People with this name ==
=== Given name ===
- Clara Alm (born 1996), Swedish footballer
- Clara Amfo (born 1984), British broadcaster and presenter
- Clara Arthur (1858–1929), American suffragist
- Klara Ashrafyan (1924–1999), Soviet Indologist
- Clara Ayres (1880–1917), American nurse during the First World War
- Clara Azurmendi (born 1998), Spanish badminton player
- Klara Badiola (born 1954), Spanish actress
- Clara Barton (1821–1912), pioneer American teacher, nurse and humanitarian
- Clara Basiana (born 1991), Spanish former competitor in synchronized swimming
- Clara Doty Bates (1838–1895), American author
- Clara Nettie Bates (1876–1966), American editor, writer, clubwoman
- Clara Bancroft Beatley (1858–1923), American educator, lecturer, author
- Clara Beranger (1886–1956), American screenwriter of the silent film era
- Clara Beyers (1880–1950), American actress
- Clara Bindi (1927–2022), Italian actress
- Klara Birtić (born 2002), Croatian handball player
- Clara Blandick (1876–1962), American actress
- Klara Bleyer 2004), German synchronised swimmer
- Clara Bonde (1806–1899), Swedish courtier and royal favourite
- Clara Bow (1905–1965), American actress
- Clara T. Bracy (1848–1941), English stage and silent film actress
- Clara Brown (1800–1885), former enslaved woman from Virginia and Kentucky who became a community leader and philanthropist
- Clara Louise Burnham (1854–1927), American novelist
- Clara Butt (1872–1936), English contralto
- Clara Campoamor (1888 - 1972), Mother of the Spanish feminist movement
- Clara Calamai (1909–1998), Italian actress
- Clara H. Sully Carhart (1843–1913), Canadian-born American educator and reformer
- Klara Castanho (born 2000), Brazilian actress
- Klára Červenková (1873–1945), Czech geographer
- Clara Germana Cele, South African woman stated in 1906 to have suffered demonic possession
- Clara Marguerite Christian (1895–1964), first black woman to study at the University of Edinburgh
- Clara Chung (born 1987), Korean-American singer/guitarist also known by her stage name, Clara C
- Clara Rankin Coblentz (1863–1933), American social reformer
- Clara Collet (1860–1948), British economist and civil servant
- Clara Novello Davies (1861–1943), Welsh singer
- Clara Driscoll (1881–1945), Texas-born philanthropist
- Clara Eliot (1896–1976), economist
- Clara Faragó (1905–1944), Hungarian chess master
- Clara Shortridge Foltz (1849–1934), first female attorney on the Pacific Coast
- Clara Friedman (1920–2015), Israeli chess player
- Clara Furse (born 1957), Chief Executive of the London Stock Exchange
- Clara Gorry (born 1989), Swedish footballer
- Clara Grima (born 1971), Spanish mathematician
- Clara Hammerl (1858–1931), Mallorcan teacher and first woman to lead a Spanish financial institution
- Clara Haskil (1895–1960), Romanian classical pianist
- Clara Hätzlerin (c. 1430–1476), professional scribe in 15th-century Augsburg
- Clara H. Hazelrigg (1861–1937), American author, educator, and social reformer
- Clara Hill, German musician
- Clara de Hirsch (born 1833–1899), Belgian businesswoman and philanthropist
- Klara Hitler (née Pölzl) (1860–1907), Mother of Adolf Hitler
- Clara Cleghorn Hoffman (1831–1908), American educator and temperance reformer
- Klara Honegger (1860–1940), Swiss suffragist and pacifist activist
- Clara Horton (1904–1976), American actress
- Clara Hughes (born 1972), Canadian athlete who has won medals in both the summer and winter Olympics
- Klára Hymlárová (born 1999), Czech ice hockey player
- Clara Immerwahr (1870–1915), German chemist, first wife of Fritz Haber
- Clara-Jumi Kang (born 1987), South Korean-German musician
- Clara Louise Kellogg (1842–1916), American soprano
- Clara Klingenström (born 1995), Swedish singer-songwriter
- Klára B. Kokas (1907–1962), Hungarian art director
- Klára Koukalová (born 1982), Czech tennis player
- Clara Shafira Krebs (born 2002), Indonesian beauty pageant titleholder, model, and entrepreneur
- Klara Kristalova (born 1967), Czech sculptor
- Clara Lachmann (1864–1920), Danish-Swedish patron of the arts
- Clara LaMore (1926–2021), American competition swimmer
- Clara Landsberg (1873–1966), American educator
- Clara Lanza (1858 – c. 1939), American novelist
- Clara Larter (1847–1936), English botanist
- Clara Ledesma (1924–1999), Dominican artist
- Clara Lee (born 1985; real name Lee Sung-min), South Korean actress
- Clara Lemlich (1886–1982), union organizer and consumer activist
- Clara Lescurat (born 1988), Argentine professional boxer
- Clara López (born 1950), Colombian politician
- Klara Luchko (1925–2005), Soviet actress
- Clara Luciani (born 1992), French singer-songwriter and musician
- Clara Luper (1923–2011), American civil rights leader
- Clara Maass (1876–1901), American nurse
- Clara MacNaughton (1854–1948), American dentist and suffragist
- Clara Mamet (born 1994), American actress
- Clara Maniu (1842–1929), Romanian feminist
- Clara McMillen (1898–1982), American researcher
- Clara Milburn (1883–1961), British diarist
- Klara Milch (1891–1970), Austrian swimmer
- Clara Moneke (born 1998), Brazilian actress and model
- Clara Jessup Moore (1824–1899), American philanthropist and philosopher
- Clara Morgane (born 1981), French porn star and singer
- Clara Mulholland (1849–1934), Irish writer
- Klara Myrén (born 1991), Swedish ice hockey player
- Clara Neal (1870–1936), English teacher and suffragist
- Clara Ng (born 1973), Indonesian writer
- Clara Novello (1818–1908), English soprano
- Clara Nunes (1942–1983), Brazilian singer
- Clara O'Shea (1894–1970), American politician
- Klara Izabella Pacowa (1631–1685), politically active Polish court official
- Clara Pacini (born 2002), French actress
- Clara Paget (born 1988), British model and actress
- Clara Peeters (circa 1594–1657), 17th century Flemish painter
- Clara Pereira (born 2010), Brazilian rhythmic gymnast
- Clara Petacci (1912–1945), mistress of Benito Mussolini
- Clara Pinto-Correia (born 1960), Portuguese novelist
- Clara Ponsatí (born 1957), Catalan economist and politician
- Clara Pratte, American politician
- Clara Raven (1905–1994), American physician
- Clara Reeve (1729–1807), English novelist
- Clara Rockmore (1911–1998), Lithuanian virtuosa of the theremin
- Klara Rumyanova (1929–2004), Soviet actress, voice of Cheburashka
- Clara Sánchez (writer) (born 1955), Spanish novelist
- Clara Sanchez (cyclist) (née Sanchez, born 1983), French cyclist
- Clara Schønfeld (1856–1938), Danish actress
- Clara Schumann (1819–1896), German pianist, composer
- Clara Segura (born 1974), Catalan actress
- Clara Seley (1905–2003), Russian Empire-born American visual artist
- Clara Shafira Krebs (born 2002), Indonesian beauty queen
- Clara Sherman (1914–2010), Navajo artist
- Clara Soccini (born 1999), Italian singer-songwriter, actress and model
- Clara Sorrenti (born 1994), Canadian Twitch streamer and transgender activist, known online as Keffals
- Clara Sosa (born 1993), Paraguayan model, television personality and beauty queen
- Clara Southern (1860–1940), Australian artist
- Clara E. Speight-Humberston (1862–1936), Canadian research scientist and scientific writer
- Clara Strack (born 2005), American basketball player
- Clara Harrison Stranahan (1831–1905), American author, college founder
- Clara Swain (1834–1910), American physician and Christian missionary
- Clara Tauson (born 2002), Danish tennis player
- Clara Thomas (academic) (1919–2013), Canadian academic.
- Clara Tott (1440–1520), German singer
- Clara Tschudi (1856–1945), Norwegian writer
- Clara Augusta Jones Trask (1839–1805), American writer
- Clara Udofa (born 1978), Nigerian tennis player
- Etso Clara Ugbodaga-Ngu, Nigerian artist and teacher.
- Clara Ursin (1828–1890), Norwegian (originally Danish) stage actress and opera singer
- Clara Vădineanu (born 1986), Romanian handballer
- Clara Vidal (born 1983), Venezuelan politician
- Clara de Vries (1915–1942), Dutch jazz trumpeter
- Clara Ward (1924–1973), American gospel singer
- Clara Webster (1821–1844), British dancer
- Clara Weekes (1852–1937), Australian educator, suffragist, labor leader and pacifist
- Clara Westhoff (1878–1954), German sculptor and artist
- Clara Belle Williams (1885–1994), first African-American graduate of New Mexico State University
- Clara Woltering (born 1983), German handball goalkeeper
- Clara Kimball Young (1890–1960), American actress
- Clara Zetkin (1857–1933), German Marxist theorist and women's rights activist

== Animals with this name ==
- Clara the Rhinoceros, female Indian rhinoceros who became famous during 17 years of touring Europe in the mid-18th century

== Fictional characters ==
- Clara (Mirbeau), the main character in Octave Mirbeau's 1899 novel The Torture Garden
- Princess Clara, in the American animated television series Drawn Together
- Aunt Clara, a recurring character in the television series Bewitched.
- Clara Clayton, wife of Doc Brown in the Back to the Future film series
- Clara Cluck, a recurring character in Disney's Mickey Mouse cartoons
- Clara del Valle Trueba, the clairvoyant key female figure of Isabel Allende's novel The House of the Spirits
- Clara Oswald, companion of the Eleventh and Twelfth Doctor in the British science-fiction television series Doctor Who
- Clara Stahlbaum (or Silberhaus) in Pyotr Ilyich Tchaikovsky's ballet adaption of The Nutcracker and the Mouse King.
- Clara Sesemann in Johanna Spyri's 1880 novel Heidi.
- Clara Vought (Stormfront) from Amazon Prime's The Boys, and its spinoff series Vought Rising.

== See also ==
- Chara (given name)
- Clara (disambiguation)
- Clare (given name)
- Claire (given name)
