= Clara =

Clara may refer to:

== Arts and entertainment ==
- Clara (2018 film), a Canadian sci-fi drama
- Clara (2019 film), a Ukrainian animated fantasy film
- Clara (TV series), a German TV series
- Clara (opera), a 1998 opera by Hans Gefors, libretto by Jean-Claude Carrière
- Clara, a 1987 one-act stage play by Arthur Miller
- Clara (album), a 2021 album by Loscil
- "Clara", a song by Scott Walker from the 2006 album The Drift
- "Clara", a song by Punch Brothers from the 2012 album Who's Feeling Young Now?

== People and fictional characters ==
- Clara (given name), a feminine given name, including a list of people and fictional characters
- Clara (surname), a list of people surnamed Clara or Clarà
- Clare of Assisi (1194–1253), sometimes called Clara, Italian saint
- Aemilia Clara, mother of Roman Emperor Didius Julianus (emperor from March to June 193)
- Didia Clara (born c. 153), only child of the Roman Emperor Didius Julianus and Empress Manlia Scantilla
- Clara (singer) (born 1999), an Italian singer-songwriter, actress and model

== Places ==
=== France ===
- Clara-Villerach, a commune of the Pyrénées-Orientales département

=== Ireland ===
- Clara, County Kilkenny, a parish
- Clara, County Offaly, a town
  - Clara Bog, a wetland near the town of Clara, County Offaly
- Clara, County Wicklow, sometimes referred to as the "smallest village in Ireland"

=== United States ===
- Clara, Florida, an area on the border of Taylor County and Dixie County
- Clara City, Minnesota
- Clara, Mississippi, an unincorporated community
- Clara, Missouri, an unincorporated community
- Clara Township, Potter County, Pennsylvania

=== Outer space ===
- 642 Clara, an asteroid

== Other uses ==
- List of storms named Clara
- Clara (beverage), a Spanish term for shandy
- Clara GAA, sports club in County Kilkenny, Ireland
- Clara GAA (Offaly), sports club in County Offaly, Ireland
- Clara railway station, County Offaly, Ireland
- Consolidated Land and Rail Australia, a property development consortium
- Clara (magazine), French feminist magazine
- CLARA, a Latin American academic computer network organization
- Clara.io, an online 3D modeling, animation and rendering tool
- Clara (moth), a genus of moth
- Clara (fly), a genus of fly (now Paraclara)
- Clara (plant), a genus of plant in subfamily Agavoideae
- Clara (rhinoceros) (c. 1738–1758), which toured Europe for 17 years
- Clara cells, former name of club cells in the lungs
- Compact Linear Accelerator for Research and Applications, a particle accelerator hosted at Daresbury Laboratory

== See also ==
- Clare (disambiguation)
- Klara (disambiguation)
