= Červenka =

Červenka (feminine: Červenková) is a Czech surname, meaning 'robin'. The Germanized version of the surname is Czerwenka. Notable people with the surname include:

- Bronislav Červenka (born 1975), Czech football player and manager
- Dominika Červenková (born 1988), Czech rhythmic gymnast
- Exene Cervenka (born 1956), American musician
- Gottfried Cervenka (1947–2015), Austrian radio presenter
- Hunter Cervenka (born 1990), American baseball player
- Klára Červenková (1873–1945) Czech academic
- Marek Červenka (born 1991), Czech footballer
- Markéta Červenková (born 1991), Czech athlete
- Martin Červenka (born 1992), Czech baseball player
- Roman Červenka (born 1985), Czech ice hockey player
- Thea Červenková (1878–1957/1961), Czech film director, screenwriter, journalist and writer
