= Czerwenka =

Czerwenka is a surname, a Germanized version of the Czech surname Červenka. Notable people with the surname include:

- Isabel Czerwenka-Wenkstetten (born 1969), Austrian visual artist
- Joseph Czerwenka (1759–1835), Austrian oboist
- Oskar Czerwenka (1924–2000), Austrian operatic bass and academic teacher

== See also ==
- Červenka (disambiguation)
