= List of paintings by Clara Peeters =

The following is an incomplete list of works by Clara Peeters that are generally accepted as autograph by the RKD, the art historian Sam Segal and other sources.

Image	Title	Year	Size	Inventory no.	Gallery	Location
	Still life with dainties, rosemary, wine, jewels and a burning candle	1607	23.7 cm x 36.7 cm		Private collection	
	Still life with flowers, goblet and dainties	1611	52 cm x 73 cm		Museo del Prado	Madrid
	Still life with tazza, stoneware jug, saltcellar and dainties	1611	55 cm x 73 cm		Museo del Prado	Madrid
	Still life of fish with a candlestick	1611	50 cm × 72 cm		Museo del Prado	Madrid
	Game piece with poultry	1611	51 cm x 71 cm		Museo del Prado	Madrid
	Still life with flowers and gilt goblets	1612	59.2 cm x 49 cm	2222	Staatliche Kunsthalle Karlsruhe	Karlsruhe
	Still life of fruit and flowers	1613	64 cm x 89 cm	LO 137.2	Ashmolean Museum	Oxford
	Still life with grapes on a tazza, a basket of fruit, two crayfish on a plate and a squirrel	1613	34.1 cm x 46.8 cm		Private collection	
	Still life with cheese, artichoke and cherries	1615	33.3 cm x 46.7 cm	M.2003.108.8	Los Angeles County Museum of Art	Los Angeles
	Still life of fish and shrimp, ca. 1615	1615	34.8 cm x 50 cm		Royal Museum of Fine Arts Antwerp	Antwerp
	Still life with crayfish and an artichoke	1615	33 cm x 46 cm		Private collection	
	Still life of fish, oysters and crayfish with a cat	1615	34 cm x 48 cm		Private collection	
	Still life with cheese, bread and drinking vessels	1615	34.5 cm x 49 cm		Mauritshuis	The Hague
	Fish still life with a flower bouquet	1615	25 cm x 35 cm	SK-A-2111	Rijksmuseum	Amsterdam
	Still Life of Fruit, Dead Birds, and a Monkey	1615-1620	47.6 cm x 65.5 cm		Private collection	
	Possible self-portrait of Clara Peeters, in vanitas style, seated at a table with flowers in a glass vase	1618	37.2 cm × 50.2 cm		Private collection	
	Still Life of Fish and Cat	1620	34.3 cm x 47 cm		National Museum of Women in the Arts	Washington D.C.

The following two similar paintings have the monograph CP and are in the style of Clara Peeters but are listed as anonymous by the RKD, which currently considers the attribution to Peeters rejected.

Image	Title	Year	Size	Inventory no.	Gallery	Location
	Breakfast still life	1630s	71 cm x 109 cm	99.308	Museum of Fine Arts, Houston	Houston, Texas
	Still life with Shellfish and Eggs	1630s	56.8 x 103.5 cm	TWCMS:B4244	Shipley Art Gallery	Gateshead, England

== 2026 new attribution ==
In 2022 a re-evaluation of Still Life with Small Game and Grapes on a Gilded Tazza, by Cynthia Osiecki, curator of the National Museum of Norway, led to a new attribution to Peeters. The painting had previously been attributed to Ambrosius Brueghel, but after an early-20th-century reassessment, the work was reclassified as being by "anonymous". The inclusion of a tazza in the composition was similar to other Peeters works and there were also similarities in the positioning of the dead birds, grapes and hazelnuts. The edge of the painting, where Peeters would typically have signed her name, had been destroyed by woodworm.
