= Still Life with Cheeses, Almonds and Pretzels =

Painting by Clara Peeters

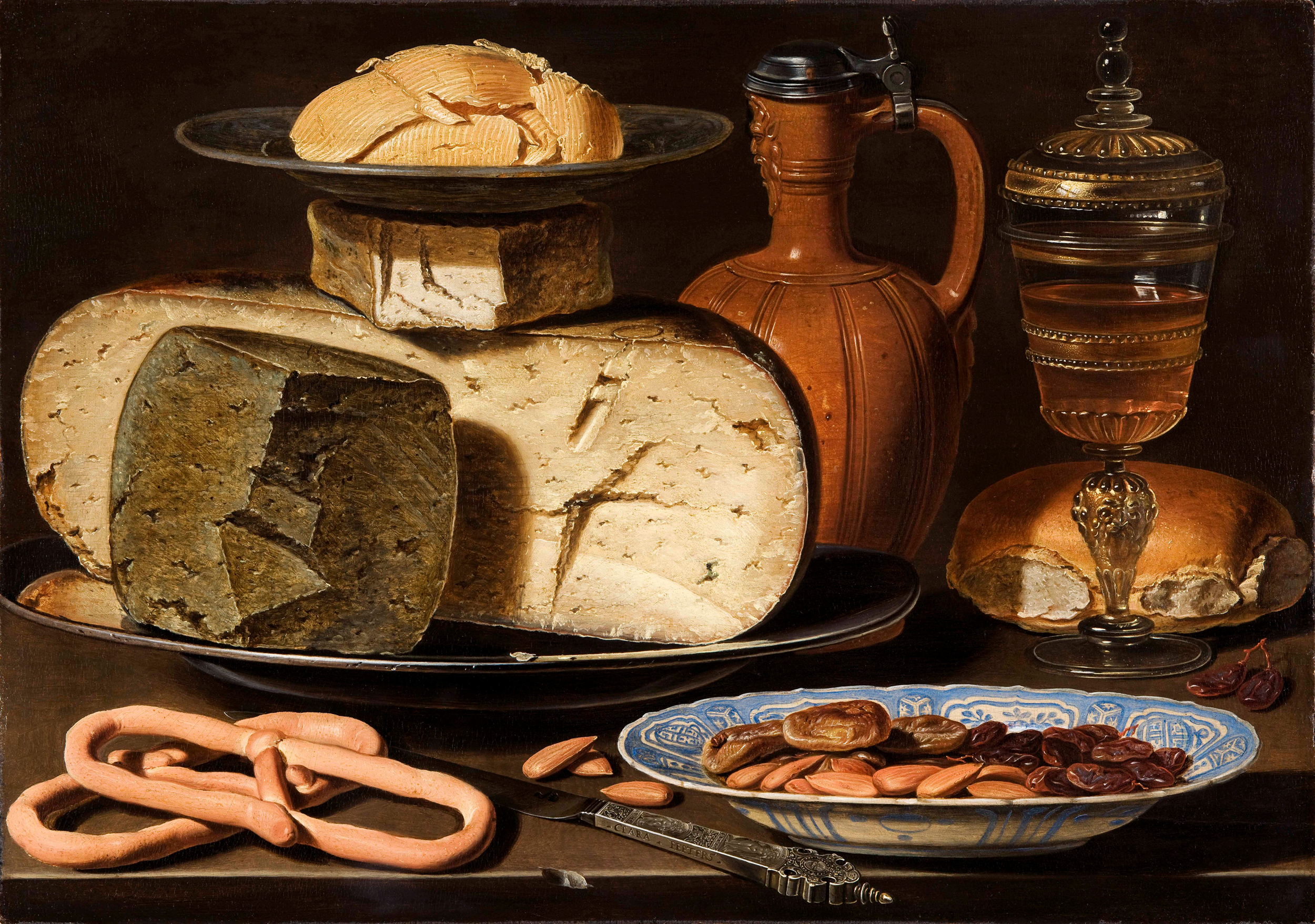
- Artist: Clara Peeters
- Year: c. 1615
- Type: Still life
- Medium: Oil on wood
- Dimensions: 34.5 cm × 49.5 cm (13.6 in × 19.5 in)
- Location: Mauritshuis, The Hague

Still Life with Cheeses, Almonds and Pretzels (Dutch: Stilleven met kazen, amandelen en krakelingen) is a painting by the Flemish artist Clara Peeters, c. 1615. It is a still life, painted in oils on a wooden panel, measuring 34.5 cm × 49.5 cm (13.6 in × 19.5 in). Peeters has painted her signature in the handle of the silver bridal knife. The painting is displayed in the Mauritshuis museum in The Hague.

== Painting ==
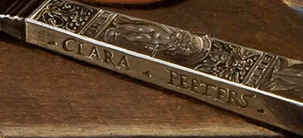
Signature of Clara Peeters on the knife handle

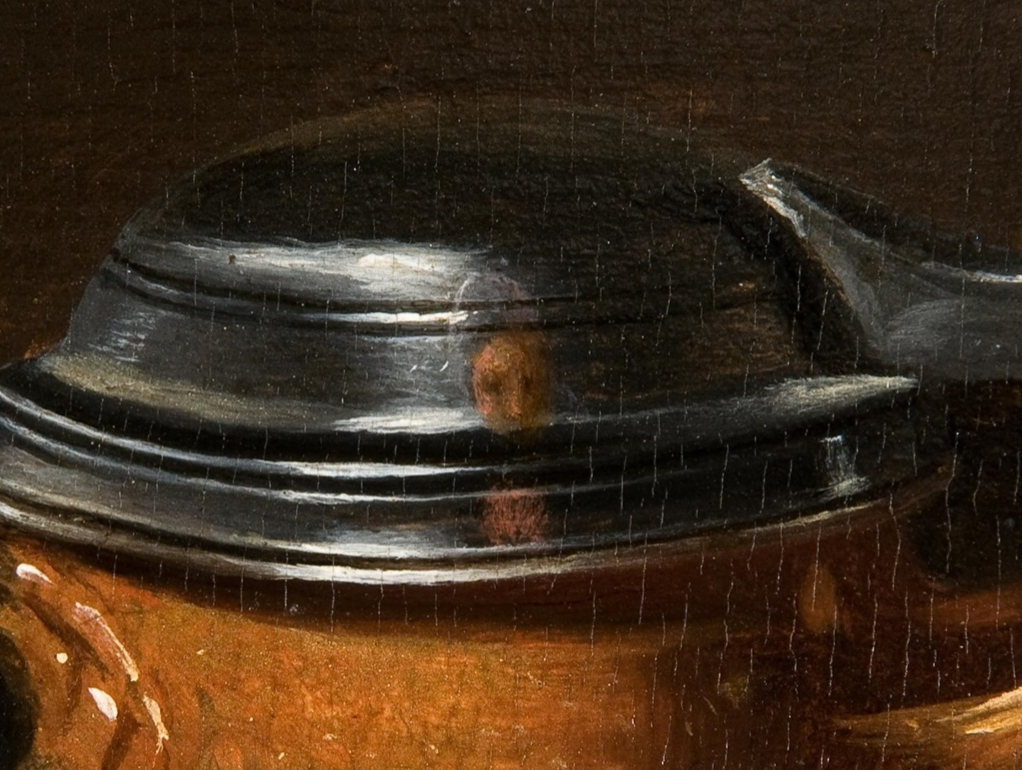
Detail showing self-portrait of the artist, who is wearing a white hat

Clara Peeters specialised in still lifes with beautiful objects, delicious fruits and expensive food. This type of still life is called "banketje" (banquet) in Dutch. The symbolism of these paintings is not fully known.

In this painting, in addition to the objects named in the title, there are also curls of butter, figs, dates and a bread roll. In the background is a gold-plated Venetian glass. The almonds, figs and dates are lying in a dish of Chinese Wanli porcelain. Peeters often used the objects in this painting in her still lifes.

Peeters has painted her own portrait reflected in the cover of the "bartmann" jug behind the cheese. She thus followed the example of Jan van Eyck, who painted his self-portrait in the mirror in his 1434 Arnolfini Portrait. Peeters made a total of seven self-portraits, including this one.

== Provenance ==
The early history of the painting is not known. It was held in a private collection in France from 1920 until it was auctioned at Drouot-Richelieu in Paris in 1998. It was bought by the Richard Green Gallery, and sold to a US private collector in 2000. The painting was acquired by the Mauritshuis museum in The Hague in June 2012. The sale was made possible by the support of the Vereniging Rembrandt (and its A.M. Roeters van Lennep Fonds, Utrechtse Rembrandt Cirkel and the Caius Fonds).

== Legacy ==
In a special episode of the TV show Kunstuur on 22 June 2014, which described the renovated Mauritshuis, the Dutch minister Jet Bussemaker explained why Still Life with Cheeses, Almonds and Pretzels was her favorite painting in the museum.

== Gallery ==
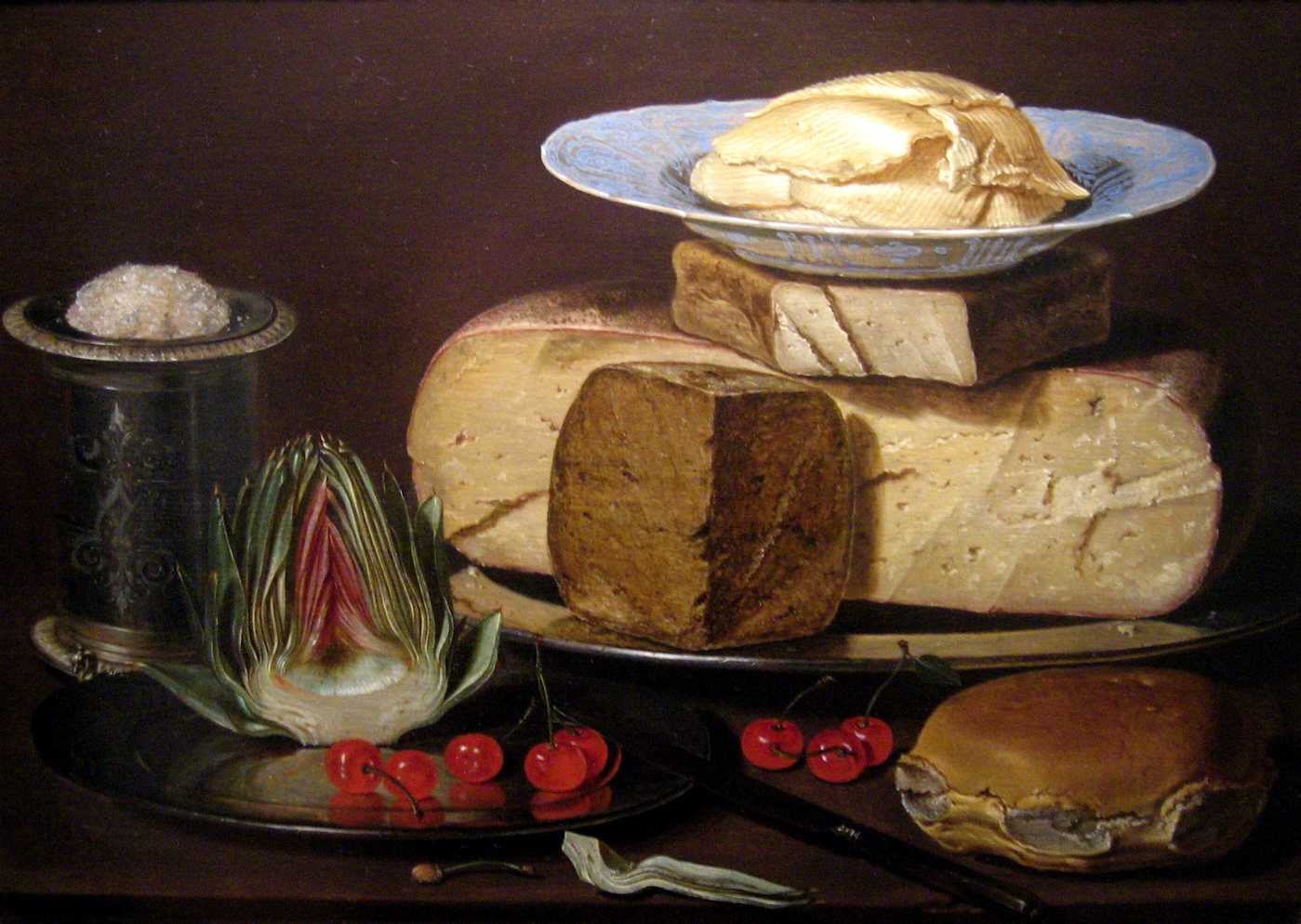
Still life with the same porcelain dish, now placed under the butter curls

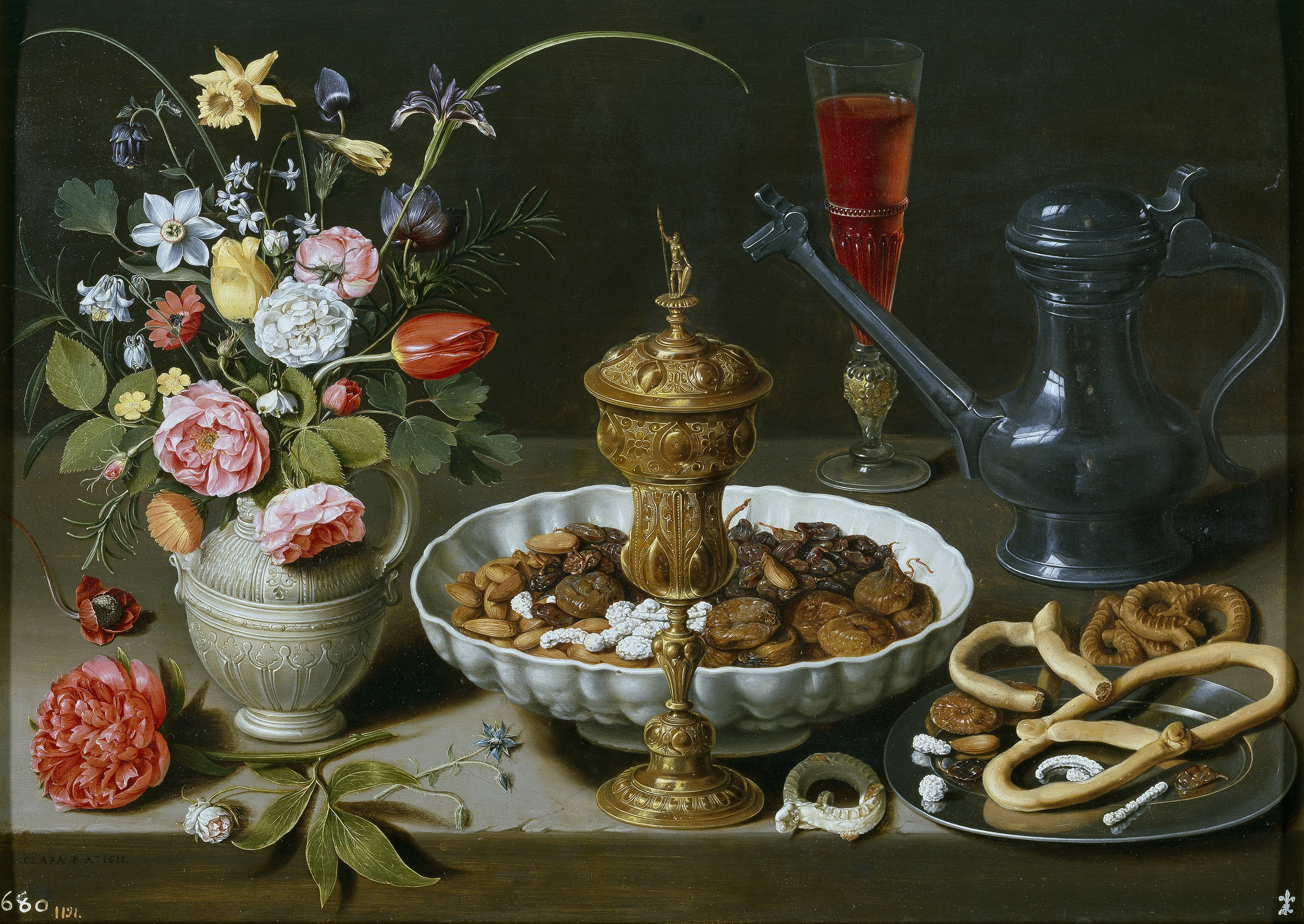
Still life with similar Venetian glass and figs. Someone has taken a bite from one of the pretzels.

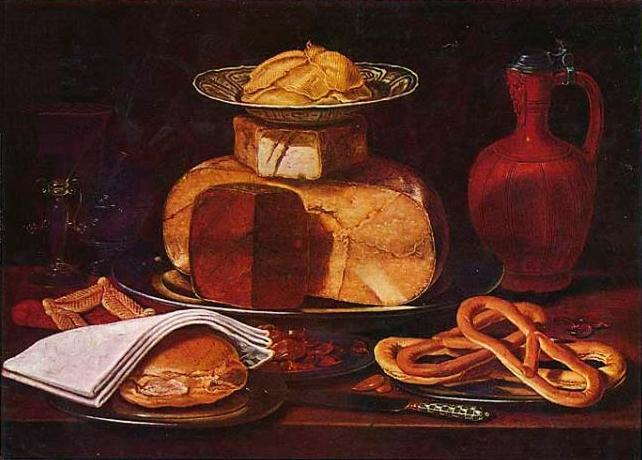
Still life with a similar position of the dish, the butter curls on top of the cheese

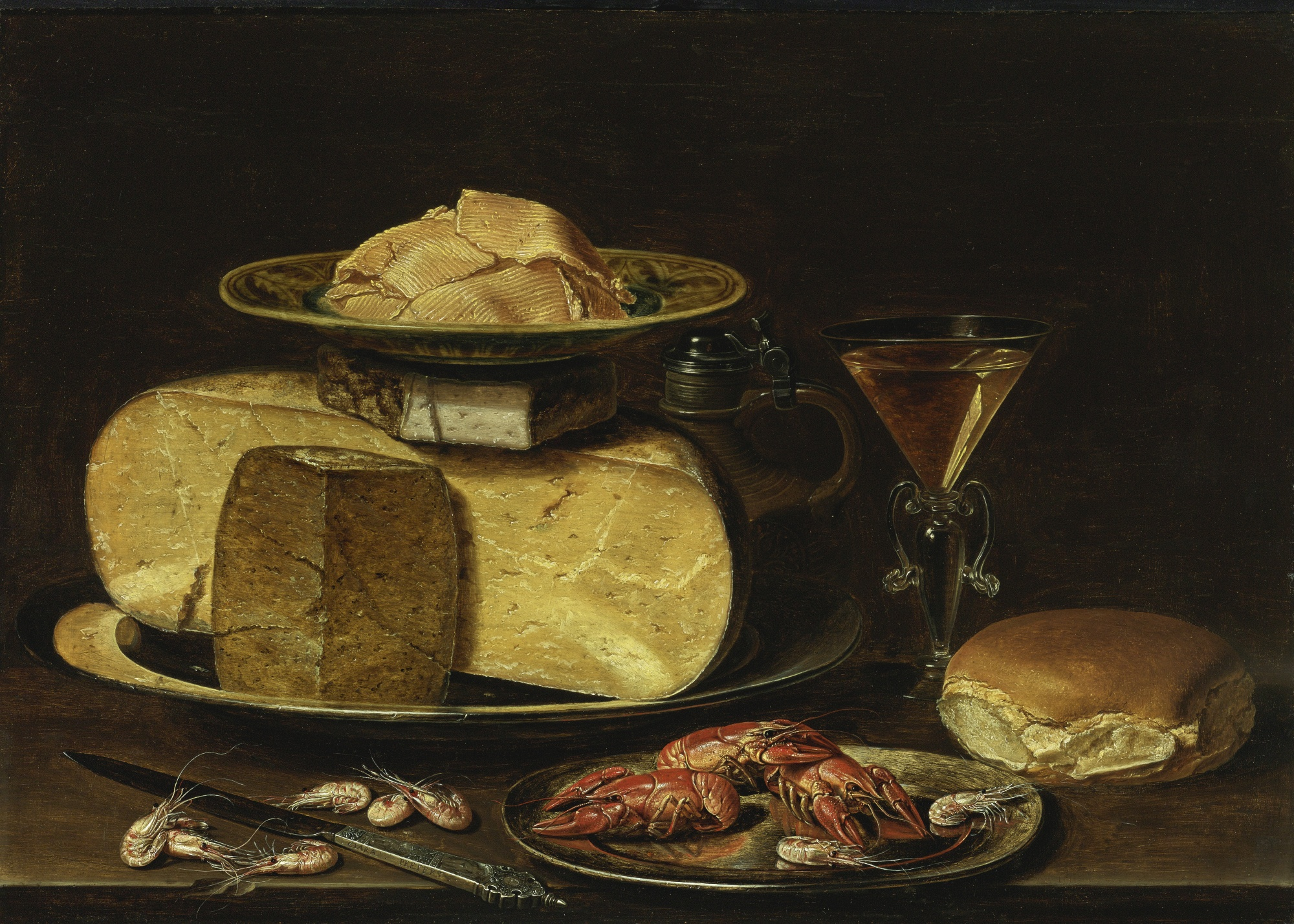
Similar composition with cheeses, butter, bread, wine, and the named knife, and also shrimp and crayfish

== See also ==
- List of paintings by Clara Peeters
