= Still Life of Fruit, Dead Birds, and a Monkey =

Painting by Clara Peeters

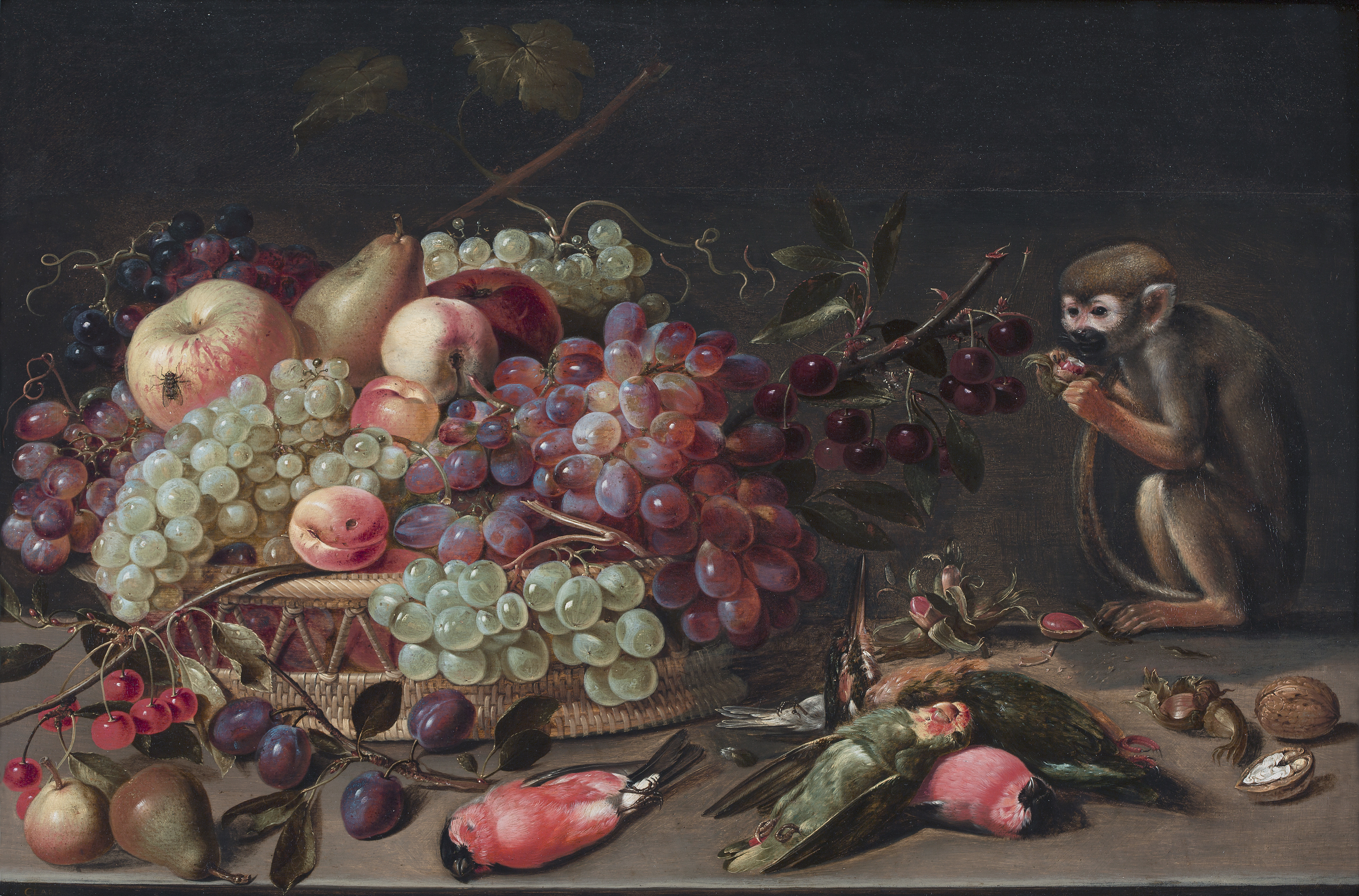
- Artist: Clara Peeters
- Year: c. 1615-1620
- Type: Still life
- Medium: Oil on wood
- Dimensions: 47.6 cm × 65.5 cm (18.7 in × 25.8 in)
- Location: Private collection

Still Life of Fruit, Dead Birds, and a Monkey (Dutch: Stilleven van vruchten in en voor een rieten mand, dode vogels en een aap) is a painting by the Dutch artist Clara Peeters, c. 1615-1620. It is a still life, painted in oils on a wooden panel, measuring 47.6 cm × 65.5 cm (18.7 in × 25.8 in). The painting is in a private collection.

== Painting ==
Fruit, Dead Birds, and a Monkey has a:

peculiar collection of objects: the grapes are covered with bloom, a peach is going rotten, and there’s a fly on an apple. The little monkey, busy feeding from nuts, is gazing at a small pile of dead birds.

== Provenance ==
The early history of the painting is not known. As of 1953, it was held by the Mullers. It was auctioned at Sotheby's to Miss Belleri on July 6, 1966. It has since been auctioned again at Sotheby's (December 11, 1991) and for 103,250 pounds at Christie's (April 24, 2009).

== Legacy ==
A History of Pictures for Children by David Hockney and Martin Gayford discusses the painting in the "Light and Shadows" chapter.

== See also ==
- List of paintings by Clara Peeters
