= Rose Prokop =

American politician (1897–1973)

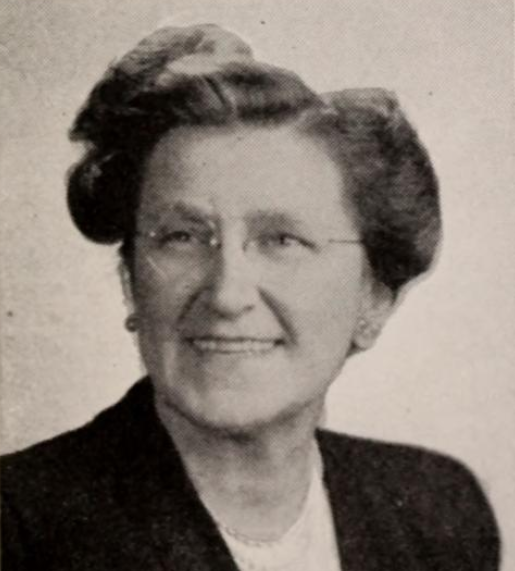
- Prokop c. 1946

Member of the Connecticut House of Representatives from Stratford
- In office 1945–1959
- Preceded by: Oscar Peterson Jr. Florence Abercrombie
- Succeeded by: Robert N. Hunziker; George F. Wright

Personal details
- Born: Rose E. Duda; January 9, 1897 Bridgeport, Connecticut, U.S.
- Died: March 22, 1973 (aged 76) Bridgeport, Connecticut, U.S.
- Party: Republican
- Spouse: Joseph W. Prokop (m. 1924; died 1954)
- Children: 2

Rose E. Prokop (January 9, 1897 – March 22, 1973) was an American politician who served in the Connecticut House of Representatives from 1945 to 1959, representing the town of Stratford as a Republican.

== Personal life ==
Prokop was born in Bridgeport, Connecticut, on January 9, 1897, to Frank and Anne K. Duda. She married Joseph W. Prokop on September 24, 1924. They lived in the Lordship neighborhood of Stratford and had two children together. Prokop and her husband were both registered pharmacists, and Joseph owned a pharmacy in Stratford. They were Catholic, and Joseph was a member of the Knights of Columbus. Joseph died in 1954.

== Connecticut House of Representatives ==
A Republican, Prokop was first elected to the Connecticut House of Representatives in 1944. She served seven terms as one of two representatives from the town of Stratford. Prokop chose not to run for reelection in 1958, citing "purely personal" reasons, and she left office in 1959. At the time of Prokop's retirement, she and Clara O'Shea were the longest-serving of the current women members of the House, with both having served fourteen consecutive years.

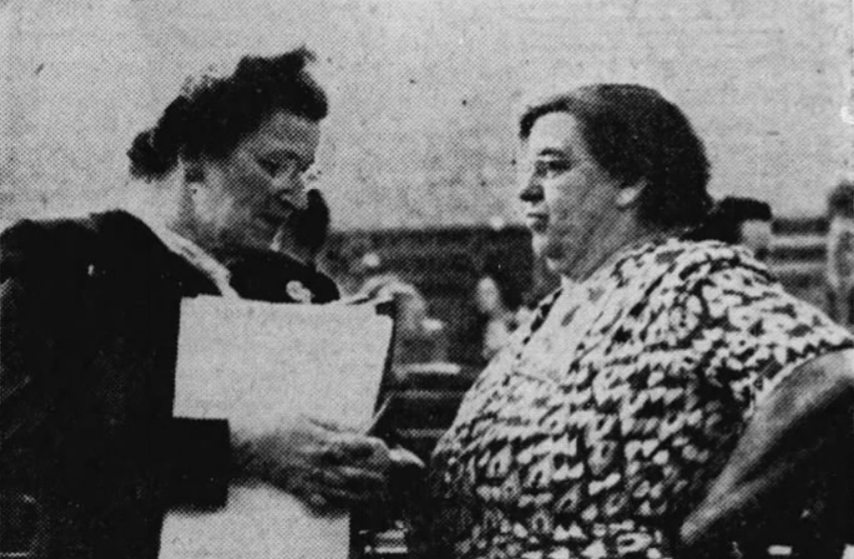
Prokop and Rep. Clara O'Shea in 1950

=== Tenure ===
Prokop served on the Public Buildings and Grounds, Public Welfare and Humane Institutions, Public Health and Safety, and Federal and Intergovernmental Relations committees throughout her tenure. She was chairman of the Public Health and Safety Committee from 1951 to 1959.

In 1955, Prokop opposed two bills on birth control, one that allowed physicians to prescribe contraceptives to women whom they believed could have their lives or health endangered by pregnancy, and one that repealed a law preventing the sale of contraceptive devices. The House passed both bills.

== Death ==
Prokop died on March 22, 1973, at St. Vincent's Hospital in Bridgeport, Connecticut. She was 76.
