= Clara (moth) =

Scientific classification
- Kingdom: Animalia
- Phylum: Arthropoda
- Class: Insecta
- Order: Lepidoptera
- Superfamily: Noctuoidea
- Family: Erebidae
- Subfamily: Calpinae
- Genus: Clara; Ruiz-Rodriguez, 1989
- Species: C. monsalvei

Binomial name
- Clara monsalvei (Ruiz-Rodriguez, 1989)

Synonyms
- Jochroa (Clara) monsalvei Ruiz-Rodriguez, 1989

Genus of moths

Clara is a monotypic moth genus of the family Erebidae. Its only species, Clara monsalvei, is found in Chile. Both the genus and the species were first described by Victor Hugo Ruiz-Rodriguez in 1989.

Other sources give this name as either a species group of Hadena Schrank, 1802 or a subgenus of Jochroa Felder, 1874.
