= Clara Hammerl =

Spanish banker, teacher (1858–1931)

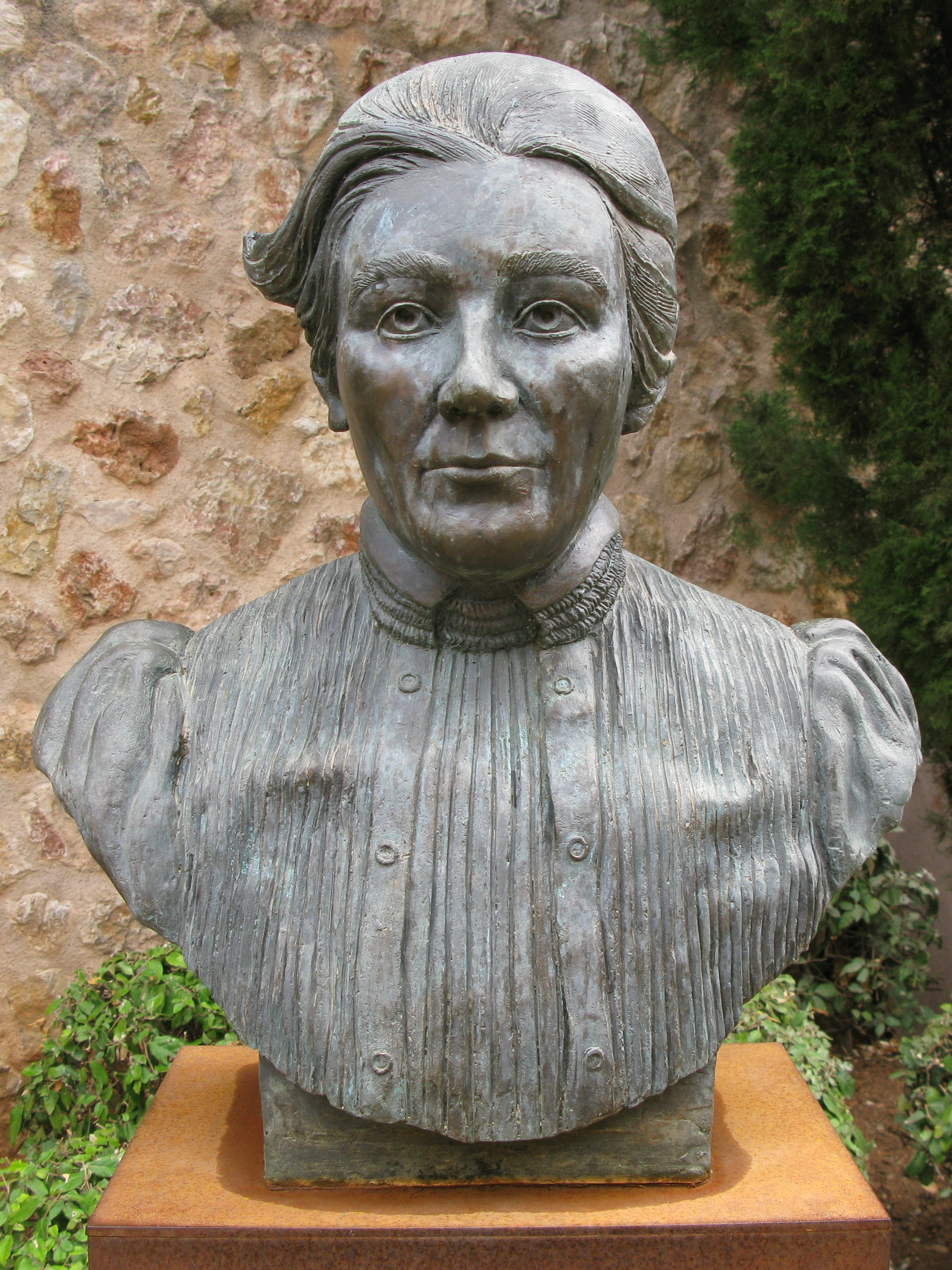
- Born: 15 March 1858; Bromberg, Prussia
- Died: 9 October 1931 (aged 73); Rufino, Argentina
- Occupations: Teacher, banker
- Known for: First woman to lead a Spanish financial institution
- Children: 2

Clara Hammerl (5 March 1858 – 9 October 1931) was a Majorcan teacher in Pollença and the first woman to lead a Spanish financial institution, the Pollença Savings Bank.

== Biography ==
Clara Hammerl was born in Bromberg, Prussia, modern-day Poland, to a locomotive driver Friedrich Hammerl and Emma Müller. Clara had a sister who was two years younger, Marie Ida Bertha Hammerl. Little is known about Clara's childhood and youth except that she was baptized in the Lutheran church. In 1885, when Clara was 17 years old, her widowed mother moved to Berlin with her two daughters.

In 1887 she was teaching a German language course at the University of Berlin that was attended by the wealthy and educated Mallorcan Guillem Cifre de Colonya, adopted son of a large landowner. He wanted to learn German so he could read the original writings of his favorite German philosopher Karl Christian Friedrich Krause. Clara Hammerl and her former student married on 7 October 1889 at the registry office in Berlin-Kreuzberg when she was 31 years old. After the civil wedding, the couple moved to Pollença on the Spanish island of Mallorca, where her husband was born.

=== Life in Mallorca ===
Like her husband, Clara Hammerl believed that education was the fundamental instrument for social progress and for the advancement of poorer sections of society. In 1879, Guillem Cifre de Colonya had founded a reform-educational, secular school (Institució d'Ensenyament) in Pollença in northeast Mallorca, Spain. It was one of the most progressive schools there and was the first school on the island of Mallorca to offer instruction for both boys and girls. In 1880, Cifre de Colonya founded a savings bank, the Colonya Caixa d'Estalvis de Pollença with the aim of giving "ordinary people" the opportunity to acquire property ("Estalvis" in the Catalan language means "savings").

With her arrival in Mallorca, Hammerl began teaching German at her husband's school. Because she was a Lutheran, reform-oriented German, blonde and a noticeably tall woman, she was not universally accepted in her new social environment. Hammerl was not fluent in Spanish and was unfamiliar with the Catalan language and the local dialect spoken in Pollença. There were calls for a boycott of the reform-oriented school. In 1893, conservative Majorcan church leaders sent a two-week "Holy Mission" of Jesuit preachers to Pollença, who were to put an end to "Protestantism and other errors" with sermons, public professions of faith and ceremonial processions.

=== Bank manager ===
Of the five children born to Clara and Guillem, only two survived. Her husband, prone to melancholy, died by suicide in 1908. After her husband's death, Hammerl formally took over the bank's management. Together with a colleague, Rafel Cortès, she expanded the banking business and personally managed its operations from 1908 to 1916, making her the first woman to manage a financial institution in Spain. It still exists as of 2024.

The school in Pollença was closed during the Spanish Civil War. To reopen it, she found a teacher who was compatible with her husband's pedagogical approach. She also looked after the family's investments, including in the import-export business and in company investments.

Clara Hammerl died in Rufino, Argentina, where her daughter lived, on 9 October 1931 at the age of 73.

== Legacy ==
- Since 2012, the secondary school in the Port of Pollença has been called “IES Clara Hammerl”
- In 2013, the town of Pollença posthumously named Clara Hammerl an honorary citizen of the municipality
- A bust of Hammerl, made by the sculptor Georgina Gamundí, was installed on the Plaça dels Seglars in Pollença
- A 2016, 45-minute Catalan-language Pollença-dialect documentary was broadcast about Hammerl
- In 2018, the first Clara Hammerl Awards were distributed to eight teachers at Pollença town hall
