= Joseph Czerwenka =

Czech-born Austrian oboist (1759–1835)

Franz Joseph Czerwenka (6 September 1759 – 23 June 1835) was a Czech-born oboist based in Vienna, Austria.

== Early life ==
Czerwenka was born in Benátky in Bohemia (present-day Benátky nad Jizerou, Czech Republic) in 1759. His brother Franz (1745–1801) was a bassoonist; his brother Theodor (1761–1827) was an oboist and composer.

== Career ==
From 1779, he played under Carl Ditters von Dittersdorf in the chapel of Philipp Gotthard von Schaffgotsch, Prince-Bishop of Breslau, in Silesia. From 1784 he was in the orchestra of Nikolaus I, Prince Esterházy, directed by Joseph Haydn, at the Prince's palace.

He settled in Vienna in 1794, where he studied under the oboist Josef Triebensee, and played in the Theater am Kärntnertor. From 1801 he played in the Wiener Hofmusikkapelle. He retired in 1822; he died in Vienna in 1835.

Czerwenka was highly regarded in his day. He played in the first performance in 1797 of Ludwig van Beethoven's Trio for two oboes and English horn, Op. 87. Beethoven's Variations on "Là ci darem la mano" (from Mozart's opera Don Giovanni), for the same instruments, WoO 28, was written for him.
