= 642 Clara =

Main-belt asteroid

Discovery
- Discovered by: Max Wolf
- Discovery site: Heidelberg
- Discovery date: 8 September 1907

Designations
- Alternative designations: 1907 ZY

Orbital characteristics
- Epoch 31 July 2016 (JD 2457600.5)
- Uncertainty parameter 0
- Observation arc: 108.42 yr (39599 d)
- Aphelion: 3.5799 AU (535.55 Gm)
- Perihelion: 2.8028 AU (419.29 Gm)
- Semi-major axis: 3.1914 AU (477.43 Gm)
- Eccentricity: 0.12176
- Orbital period (sidereal): 5.70 yr (2082.4 d)
- Mean anomaly: 307.116°
- Mean motion: 0° 10^{m} 22.368^{s} / day
- Inclination: 8.1702°
- Longitude of ascending node: 5.9035°
- Argument of perihelion: 118.101°

Physical characteristics
- Mean radius: 16.68±0.75 km
- Mass: (7.6±3.4)×10^{17} kg (Note: Calculated from its standard gravitational parameter GM = 0.051±0.023 km^{3}/s^{2}.)
- Mean density: 39.61 g/cm^{3} (Note: Assuming a diameter of 33.4 km.)
- Synodic rotation period: 8.2308 h (0.34295 d)
- Geometric albedo: 0.1617±0.015
- Absolute magnitude (H): 9.98

642 Clara is a minor planet orbiting the Sun. Discovered by Max Wolf in 1907, it is named after one of the housekeepers in Wolf's household.
