= Clara (2019 film) =

2019 animated film

- Ukrainian: Клара та чарівний дракон
- Directed by: Oleksandr Klymenko
- Screenplay by: Oleksandr Klymenko; Serhii Grabar
- Produced by: Svitlana Ponomarenko; Yuriy Levchuk
- Music by: Ivan Rozyn; Max Smogol; Zakhar Dzyubenko; Nikita Moiseev
- Production company: Image Pictures
- Release date: 26 October 2019
- Running time: 87 minutes
- Country: Ukraine
- Language: Ukrainian
- Box office: $575,151

Clara (Ukrainian: «Клара та чарівний дракон», romanized: Klara ta charivnyi drakon, lit. 'Clara and the Magic Dragon') also released internationally as The Little Dragon is a 2019 Ukrainian computer-animated fantasy adventure film directed by Oleksandr Klymenko from a screenplay by Klymenko and Serhii Grabar. Produced by Image Pictures, Clara was released in Ukrainian cinemas on 26 October 2019.

== Premise ==
One day, Clara, who lives in a small house with three monkeys, finds a magical dragon in a forest. After some deliberation, Clara, together with two friends, a cheerful raccoon and a grumpy dwarf, decide to help the little dragon by attempting to find his home. However, unbeknownst to them, the Forces of Evil are hunting not only the Dragon, but now Clara and her friends as well.

== Voice cast ==
The Ukrainian voice cast:

- Veronika Lukyanenko as Clara
- Oleksandr Pogrebnyak as Raccoon
- Serhiy Solopai as Alfred
- Dmytro Zavadskyi as Sip
- Matvii Nikolaev as Alchemist
- Kyrylo Nikitenko as Panther
- Dmytro Vikulov as Mole
- Dmytro Gavrilov as innkeeper
- Yuriy Soskov as Boy Dwarf
- Kateryna Bashkina-Zlenko as Girl Gnome
- Oleg Lepenets as Grandfather Gnome
- Vyacheslav Dudko as Blacksmith Gnome
- Demyan Shiyan as Boy
- Oleg Lepenets as Butler

== Music ==
The soundtrack was composed by Ivan Rozyn, Max Smogol, Zakhar Dzyubenko and Nikita Moiseev. Pur:Pur performed songs in both Ukrainian and English, while one of the songs was performed by the Dovzhenko Sound Studio musical orchestra.
