= Isabel Czerwenka-Wenkstetten =

Austrian artist (born 1969)

Isabel Czerwenka-Wenkstetten (born 1969) is a contemporary Austrian visual artist.

== Biography ==
Czerwenka-Wenkstetten was educated in London and Vienna, and is noted for the influence of her natural sciences background on her art, which explores (according to her artist's statement) "inner, exterior, and in-between spaces and limits, boundaries, as well as different structures, grown or man-made, which mirror the patriarchal approaches we have slowly grown out of over the past century." Her art incorporates multiple textures and materials, including mirrors, glass, metalware and silicone, and analog and digital photographs. She has organized art projects in Austria, Germany, Poland, India, Nigeria, UK, United States, Iceland and Palestine. Czerwenka-Wenkstetten is a member of Emergence of Projects (eop), a transdisciplinary network of artists, a founding member of the "Fishpool Aquarium for Art and Social Affairs" in Vienna, and is listed in the Elizabeth A. Sackler Center for Feminist Art's Feminist Art Base.
