= Klára Červenková =

Czech geographer, anthropologist and academic

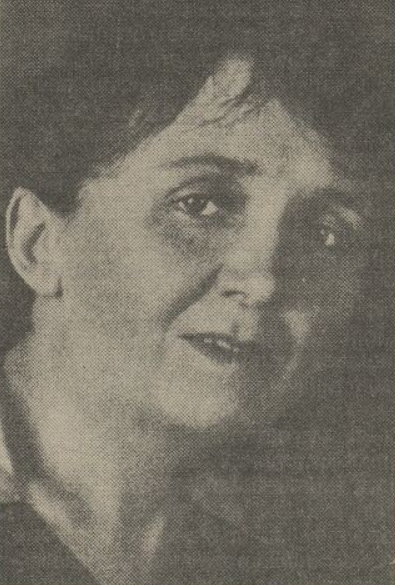
- Born: 11 August 1873; Prague, Austria-Hungary
- Died: 12 May 1945 (aged 71); Ravensbrück concentration camp, Nazi Germany
- Education: Charles University
- Occupations: Geographer, anthropologist and academic
- Known for: Anti-fascist activism

Klára Červenková (11 August 1873 – 12 May 1945) was a Czech geographer, anthropologist, academic, suffragist and pacifist. She was one of the first women to graduate from the Faculty of Philosophy of Charles University and one of the first Czech women to obtain a university degree. Because of her anti-fascist stance, she was arrested and imprisoned in a concentration camp for women in Ravensbrück, Germany, at the end of World War II.

== Life and work ==
Klára Červenková was born on 11 August 1873 in the Old Town of Prague to the family of the tailor Josef Červenka, originally from Sedlčany, and his wife Marie Červinková, from Městek Králové. Klára had a twin sister, Maria. After graduating from school, she began studying in Prague at the age of 19 at the newly opened (in 1890) first private girls' high school in Central Europe called Minerva, where she was taught by, among others, Albína Honzáková and Marie Baborová.

=== Pedagogical activity ===
After graduating from that school in 1898, she began attending lectures at the Faculty of Philosophy of Charles University. Until 1900, girls were only allowed to attend lectures for "residential studies" (without the status of regular students), but in 1900, a new law enabled girls to take exams for the entire period of their studies. Červenková was not accepted as a student until 1906. In the meantime, she started teaching Czech language and geography at the girls' and women's school of the Czech Women's Production Association. At that time, the teaching profession required women to promise celibacy so Červenková remained unmarried throughout her life.

In 1913, she passed the exams in geography and anthropology and the secondary exam in philosophy, and graduated from the Charles-Ferdinand University on 28 July 1913. Her dissertation was titled Economic Conditions in Eastern Africa.

After the creation of Czechoslovakia and the establishment of equal rights of men and women in the field of higher education, she continued attending the School of Advanced Pedagogical Studies in Prague and worked as a teacher at the Minerva grammar school. In 1923, she became a teacher at the Second Czech Girls' Real Municipal Gymnasium.

=== Public activity ===
Even as a student, Červenková started to get involved in Czech social activities, she was a member of a number of women's associations and organizations. She was also politically involved, first in Masaryk's Realist Party, then in the Czech Social Democratic Workers' Party. In cooperation with Karla Máchovu, she participated in the activities of the Committee for Women's Suffrage. After the creation of the Women's National Council after 1918, she became its vice-president, for which she collaborated with, for example, Františka Plamínková and Milada Horáková. In articles and professional texts, she dealt, among other things, with the analysis of Marxist national economics.

After the outbreak of the Spanish Civil War in 1936, she was vice chairman of a group active in supporting the republican democratic government against the fascist forces of General Francisco Franco and initiatives for a peaceful resolution of the conflict.

=== Imprisonment and death ===
After the establishment of the Protectorate of Bohemia and Moravia on 15 March 1939, Czech women's activities were officially restricted. Červenková was arrested 28 October 1941, and eventually imprisoned in the women's section of the Ravensbrück Concentration Camp in Nazi Germany because of her left-wing political orientation and anti-fascist activities during the Spanish Civil War in 1943. She was held there with some of her former students and with other figures of the female left-wing intelligentsia, such as Jožka Jabůrková, Anna Křenová, Marie Urbanová and Gusta Fučíková. Despite her failing health and eyesight, she participated in secret meetings and gave history lectures to other camp prisoners.

Klára Červenková died in the camp on 12 May 1945, at the age of 71.

=== Honors ===
Her name is listed on the commemorative plaque of the members of the physical education unit of the Czech Social Democracy who died in World War II. It's located on Strahovská Street in Prague.
