= Clara O'Shea =

American politician (1894–1970)

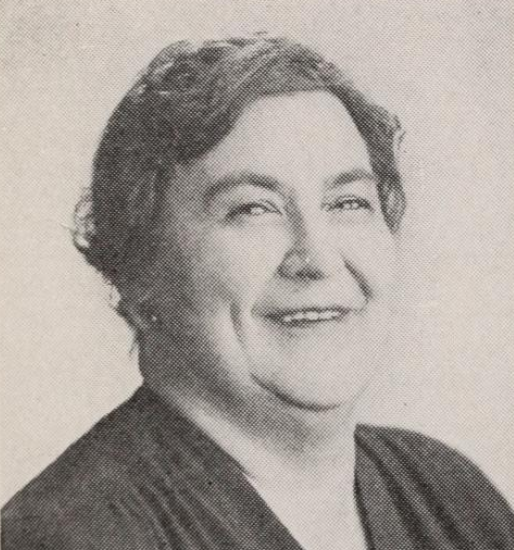
- O'Shea c. 1946

Member of the Connecticut House of Representatives from Beacon Falls
- In office 1945–1961
- Preceded by: William B. Bradley Sr.
- Succeeded by: Edward R. Betkoski

Personal details
- Born: Clara Forst; May 4, 1894 Derby, Connecticut, U.S.
- Died: June 22, 1970 (aged 76)
- Party: Democratic
- Spouse(s): Thomas Patterson; David O'Shea
- Children: 4

Clara P. O'Shea (née Forst; May 4, 1894 – June 22, 1970) was an American politician who served in the Connecticut House of Representatives from 1945 to 1961, representing the town of Beacon Falls as a Democrat.

== Personal life ==
O'Shea was born on May 4, 1894, in Derby, Connecticut, to John and Minnie Forst. She attended elementary school in Beacon Falls and graduated from Seymour High School.

O'Shea married her first husband, Thomas Patterson, when she was 18, and together they had four children. Patterson died during the 1918–1920 flu pandemic, when O'Shea was 23. She married her second husband, David O'Shea, three years later, and they remained together until David's death.

== Career ==
=== Beacon Falls ===
O'Shea began her political career in 1932 in Beacon Falls, Connecticut, as vice-chairman of the town's Democratic Party. O'Shea held the position until 1957, when she became chairman. She worked as an auditor for the town and served three terms on its school board.

=== Connecticut House of Representatives ===
==== Elections ====
O'Shea was first elected to the Connecticut House of Representatives in 1944, defeating Republican incumbent William B. Bradley Sr., and she served eight terms representing the town of Beacon Falls as a Democrat.

O'Shea ran for a ninth term in 1960, but was defeated by Edward R. Betkoski in the Democratic primary by a margin of 57 votes. She continued her 1960 campaign as a write-in candidate, a decision that John Moran Bailey, the chairman of the Democratic Party of Connecticut, criticized. Bailey referred to Betkoski as "the only legal Democratic candidate for state representative in Beacon Falls" and stated that O'Shea should withdraw, expressing concern that her candidacy could split the vote and cost Democrats the seat altogether. O'Shea did not withdraw and stated that she was more qualified for the position than Betkoski. Her campaign was unsuccessful, and Betkoski succeeded her in 1961.

==== Tenure ====
Much of O'Shea's focus throughout her career was on environmental, road, and utility issues in Beacon Falls and other towns in the area now known as the Naugatuck Valley Planning Region.

In 1951, O'Shea opposed a bill seeking to give the Bridgeport Hydraulic Company eminent domain over two brooks in Oxford. Residents and representatives expressed concern about the area being used as a watershed and its potential impact on Hop Brook, which already experienced a problematic rise in water levels during rainfall. O'Shea stated that Fairfield County, where the Bridgeport Hydraulic Company was located, had enough water, and the company should not extend to New Haven County. She remarked, "Why don't the city slickers stay away from the country folks and leave us alone?"

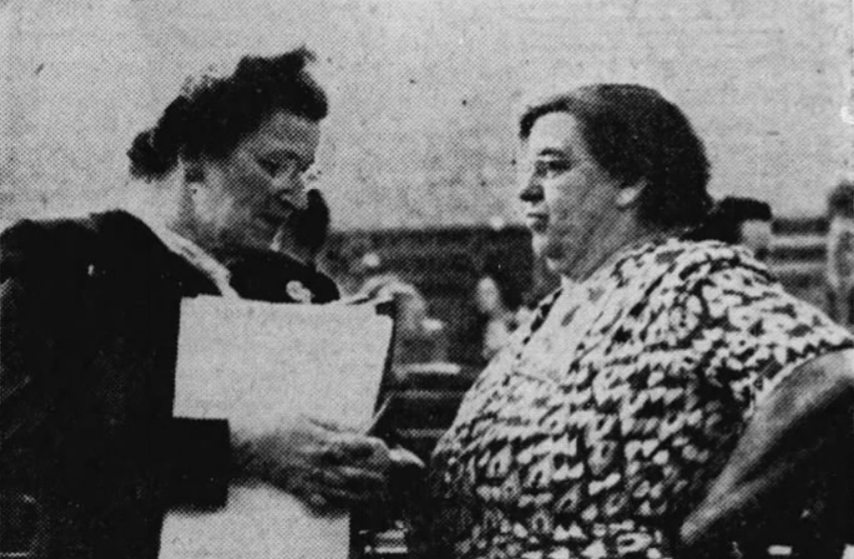
Rep. Rose Prokop and O'Shea in 1950

Throughout the 1950s, O'Shea authored and supported bills to fund improvements to High Rock, a part of Naugatuck State Forest. In 1955, O'Shea sponsored a bill to provide $12,500 for improvements. The Connecticut General Assembly passed the bill, but it was vetoed by Governor Abe Ribicoff. In 1959, O'Shea filed a bill to charge the Connecticut Highway Department with maintaining a road in Beacon Falls that led to High Rock.

In 1959, O'Shea expressed support for the Pines Bridge Redevelopment Plan, which would have funded the purchase and demolition of residential properties impacted by a 1955 flood in the Pines Bridge area of Beacon Falls. Opponents argued that the plan was too costly and would leave "better than 13 acres for unsightly briers and poison shrubs to take over". The town voted "overwhelmingly" against the plan in March 1959.

O'Shea was a member of the Connecticut branch of the National Order of Women Legislators. She was elected president of the branch in 1955, succeeding Rep. Beulah Blackman and becoming the first Democrat to hold the position in over 20 years.

=== Later career ===
Following her service in the House of Representatives, O'Shea worked as a Senate messenger for the Connecticut General Assembly. In 1968, she was appointed to Southbury Training School's board of directors.

== Death ==
O'Shea died on June 22, 1970, at age 76.
