= Clara MacNaughton =

American dentist and suffragist

Clara W. MacNaughton (February 28, 1854 – July 31, 1948) was an American dentist and suffragist.

== Career ==
Clara MacNaughton studied dentistry at the University of Michigan School of Dentistry and graduated with her DDS in 1885. She practiced dentistry in Grand Rapids, Michigan, and in 1889, she was named Vice President of the Michigan State Dental Association, becoming the first woman to serve in that role. In 1889, MacNaughton was a delegate to the International Dental Congress, held in Paris, France. She moved to Washington, DC, in 1890 and practiced dentistry there, advertising "special attention given to ladies and children." In 1893, MacNaughton served on the Woman’s Advisory Council of the World’s Columbian Dental Congress in Chicago.

== Suffrage ==
MacNaughton also was a champion of woman's suffrage, joining with others in a variety of organizations devoted to that cause. She contributed to the incorporation of the District Woman’s Suffrage Association in Washington, D.C., and in 1900, was elected President of that Association. The DWSA focused on raising the issue of woman suffrage in various venues and petitioning Congress for voting rights. MacNaughton was also active in the Federal Suffrage Association and in 1913, as Treasurer of the FSA, MacNaughton helped to raise money, circulate petitions, and generate interested in the cause of suffrage for women. MacNaughton also served as Vice President of the Federal Women’s Equality Association and she was a member of the National American Woman Suffrage Association. In these organizations, she worked closely and corresponded with other career women and suffragists of the time, including Clara Bewick Colby, Olympia Brown, and Belva Ann Lockwood.

== Personal life ==
Clara MacNaughton, whose name was sometimes spelled McNaughton, was born Clarenda Eveline Rosalia Walworth in 1854 in Akron N.Y. to William Walworth and Ruth Brooks. She married William Henry McNaughton in 1873, but her husband died shortly afterwards in 1876. Being widowed at a young age made MacNaughton aware of the importance of women's equality. She had one daughter, Marie MacNaughton Davis. Clara MacNaughton died in Oakland, California on July 31, 1948.
