= Clara Milburn =

British housewife and diarist (1883–1961)

- Born: 24 June 1883; Coventry
- Died: 29 May 1961 (aged 77); Royal Leamington Spa
- Occupations: Housewife and diarist
- Known for: World War II diary
- Spouse: John 'Jack' Milburn
- Children: 1

Clara Milburn born Clara Emily Bagnall (24 June 1883 – 29 May 1961) was a British housewife in Coventry whose diary gives an insight into domestic life during the Second World War.

== Life ==
Milburn was born in Coventry in 1883. Her parents were Harriett (born Gibson) and her husband Frank Bagnall who was an iron turner. She had a brother named Frank who was in the engineering trade. Clara married "Jack" (John) Milburn in 1905 and they led a middle class life with a lifelong maid and two cars. She was a member of her local church and the Women's Institute and a supporter of her city's 14th-century cathedral. She and Jack had one child, Alan John Milburn, who was born in 1914.

Her brother and her husband worked at Alfred Herbert Ltd, who manufactured machine tools in Coventry. His wages paid for their cars and she was particularly keen on driving them for pleasure.

The year 1940 was eventful. Her only son was serving in the Territorial Army and in January he was sent overseas; the following month she started the diary that would record her family and Coventry's experience of the Second World War. In June 1940, she wrote that Alan was missing in action. In the middle of July, she found out that Alan was not dead, but instead a prisoner of war.

That year, Milburn and her family were sheltering from German bombers who were conducting nighttime raids over Britain. The terrible raid of the night of 14 November saw them confined to their shelter for ten hours. When they emerged the "heart had been knocked out" of Coventry. She heard that her son had a leg wound, but it was not until January 1941 that she had a letter from him confirming that he was a prisoner, but that his leg was better. He did not return to Coventry until 10 May 1945.

Her son Alan died following a car crash in November 1959. Clara died 18 months later in Royal Leamington Spa on 28 May 1961.

== Legacy ==
After the death of Mrs Milburn, the fifteen volumes ended up in an attic until they were re-found and read by Christopher Morgan; the husband of the author's granddaughter. He was intrigued and he championed them with publishers. Fontana decided to publish them after they had been edited by Peter Donnelly. They were published in 1979 and they cover the years of the Second World War.

Her diary features in a book by Virginia Nicholson about women's experiences in Coventry during the Second World War.
