= Gottfried Cervenka =

Austrian radio presenter

Gottfried R. Cervenka
- Born: 29 August 1947; Vienna, Austria
- Died: 15 December 2015 (aged 68); Mödling, Austria

Gottfried R. Cervenka (29 August 1947 – 15 December 2015) was an Austrian radio presenter.

== Life ==
Cervenka was born in Vienna. Already in the Bundesrealgymnasium Vereinsgasse in Leopoldstadt his interest for music was aroused, because the then music professor Hans Zimmerl was able to inspire the students with his special enthusiasm and passionate love for this genre. He was even able to bring famous singers like Max Lorenz to school.

For more than 30 years, Cervenka regularly directed opera programmes for the Österreichischer Rundfunk on Ö1, in particular the opera concert every Tuesday afternoon, which focused on historical recordings. In designing the programmes, he was able to draw on his own music collection, comprising some 40,000 recordings. With his programmes he also succeeded in arousing the interest of a broad audience for artists largely unknown in Austria such as Gert Lutze. His last show was dedicated to Hugh Beresford on his 90th birthday.

In addition, he also presented operetta broadcasts and opera transmissions, especially from the Metropolitan Opera.

For more than 25 years he also ran the "Da Caruso" shop in Vienna's Operngasse, which was known worldwide as a specialist shop for classical music.

Cervenka was married and had a son, whom he named after the tenor Lauritz Melchior.

Cervenka died in Mödling at the age of 68.
