= Clara (surname) =

Clara or Clarà is a surname. Notable people with the surname include:

- Damian Clara (born 2005), Italian ice hockey goaltender
- Florian Clara (born 1988), Italian luger
- Jaime Clara (born 1965), Uruguayan journalist and writer
- Josep Clarà (1878–1958), Spanish sculptor
- Patrick Clara (1863–1915), Australian politician
- Roland Clara (born 1982), Italian cross country skier
