= Klara =

Klara may refer to:

- Klara, a female given name, see Clara (given name)
- Klara (radio), a classical-music radio station in Belgium
- Klara (singer), birth name Klára Vytisková (born 1985), Czech singer
- Klara (Stockholm), an area of central Stockholm
- Klarälven (the Klar River, or River Klara) in Sweden
- VinFast Klara, an electric scooter made in Vietnam
