= Jochroa =

Scientific classification
- Kingdom: Animalia
- Phylum: Arthropoda
- Class: Insecta
- Order: Lepidoptera
- Superfamily: Noctuoidea
- Family: Erebidae
- Subfamily: Calpinae
- Genus: Jochroa; Felder, 1874
- Species: J. chlorogastra

Binomial name
- Jochroa chlorogastra Felder, 1874

Genus of moths

Jochroa is a monotypic moth genus of the family Erebidae. Its only species, Jochroa chlorogastra, is found in Chile. Both the genus and the species were first described by Felder in 1874.
