= Jožka Jabůrková =

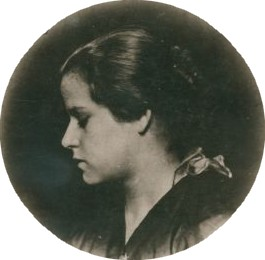
- Born: Josefa Žofie Řehová; 16 April 1896; Vitkovice, Austria-Hungary
- Died: 31 July 1942 (aged 46); Ravensbrück concentration camp, Nazi Germany
- Other names: Ida Ostravská
- Occupations: Writer, journalist

Jožka Žofie Jabůrková (16 April 1896 – 31 July 1942) was a Czech journalist, writer and translator. She became the Prague councillor in 1931 and was a member of the Czechoslovak anti-fascist resistance. Shortly after the establishment of the Protectorate she was arrested by the Nazis and imprisoned in the Ravensbrück concentration camp where she was eventually tortured to death.

== Life ==
Jožka Řehová was born on April 16, 1896, in Vítkovice to dressmaker Anežka Řehová, who died soon after. During the First World War she worked in Vítkovice Ironworks and later in the company's hospital. After the war she moved to Prague where she committed herself to the Social Democratic and later the Communist movement.

She worked in physical education and held several positions in the Social Democratic Youth and Workers. She studied briefly in Moscow at the local Institute of Physical Training. She used her literary talent in the field of women's work (work in magazines), where she took up social issues. She was involved in antiwar activities and organized actions on behalf of suffering children in the Spanish Civil War. In 1931, she was on the list of the Communist Party elected to the Chamber of Deputies of Prague. In this role, she continued her involvement in the field of women's work, child protection, unemployment, poverty, and health. She wrote about life in Prague, the concerns and interests of women, pointed to the possibility of addressing unemployment, devoted to the needs of children. She touched all the major social issues, responded to the threat of war. Under her leadership, the sower organized actions in favor of children suffering in Spain and to help the German anti-fascists fleeing to Czechoslovakia. She became a writer, and has written several books, such as Child Evička in Wonderland.

In 1931 she was elected to the Central Council of the Capital City of Prague on the ticket of the Communist Party. Her social conscience manifested here. She advocated the establishment of nurseries, kindergartens, canteens and playgrounds, effective health care for children of workers and the unemployed, develop cheap modern homes for underprivileged families. Built a consistently against manifestations of fascism and pointed out its dangers. It sought to create a unified national anti-fascist front.

== Imprisonment and death ==
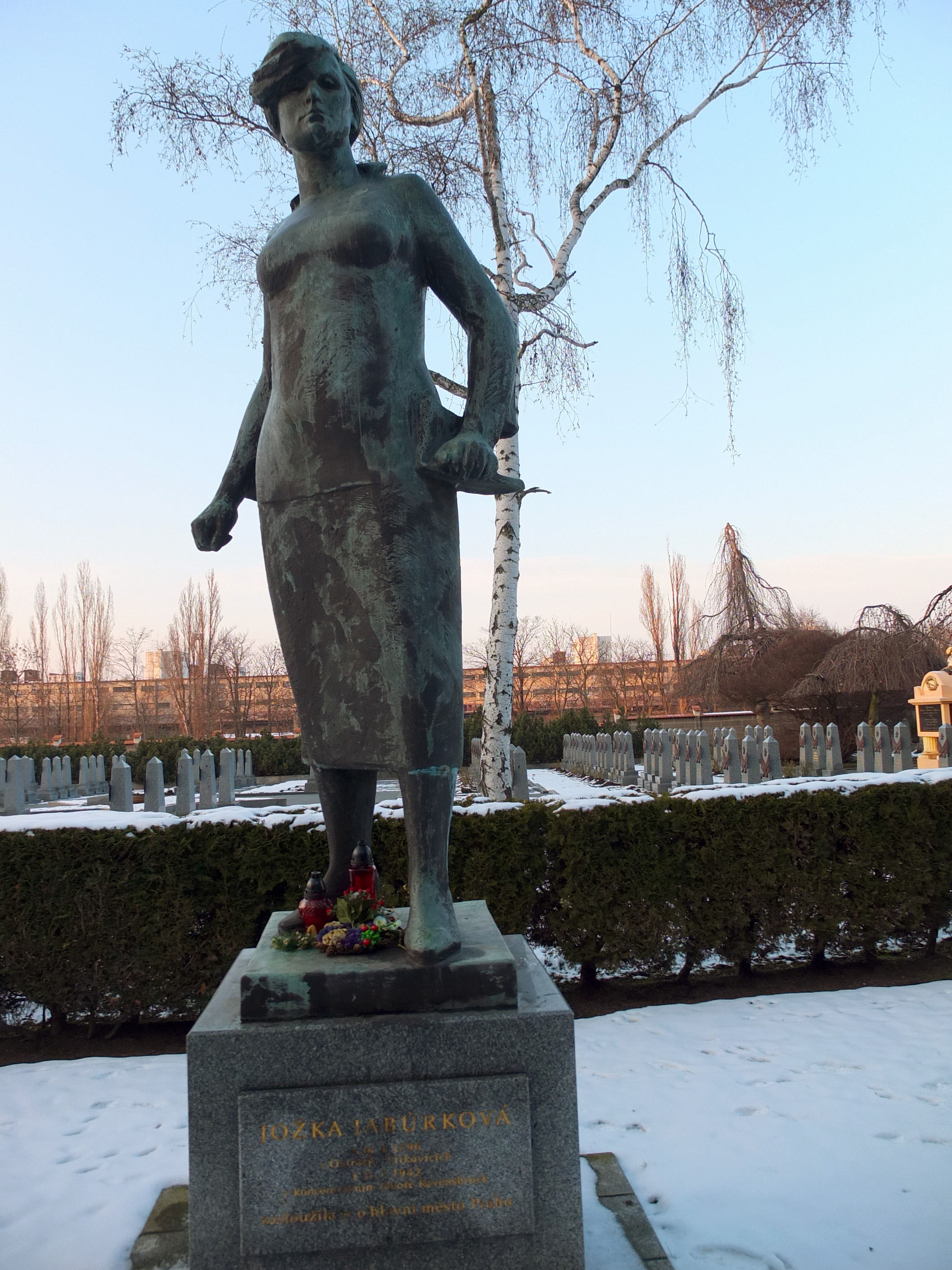
A memorial to Jožka Jabůrková, Olšany Cemetery, Prague

During the night of 15 to 16 March 1939 Jabůrková was arrested after the entry of German troops in Prague and the establishment of the Protectorate. She and 6000 other people were arrested during the first great wave of arrests (so-called lattice action or "akce Mříže"). She was later imprisoned in the Ravensbrück concentration camp where she was one of the first Czech female prisoners. She was in contact with other anti-fascist-minded prisoners, particularly German women who had been imprisoned long-term. She died on 31 July 1942 to abuse and torture during interrogation.

Sculptor Věra Merhautová created an oversized bronze statue of Jabůrková from 1960 to 1965. The monument was unveiled in a small park at the intersection of Plzeňská and Podbělohorská streets in Prague-Košíře in 1965. The monument was removed and transferred to the Prague City Gallery depository in 1992 without the knowledge of the sculptor. Here it remained until the summer of 2002, when the statue moved to Olšany Cemetery.

The original screenplay for the film Night Overtake Me (Zastihla mě noc, 1985) by Juraj Herz was based on the life and death of Jabůrková.
