= Clara Peeters =

Dutch artist

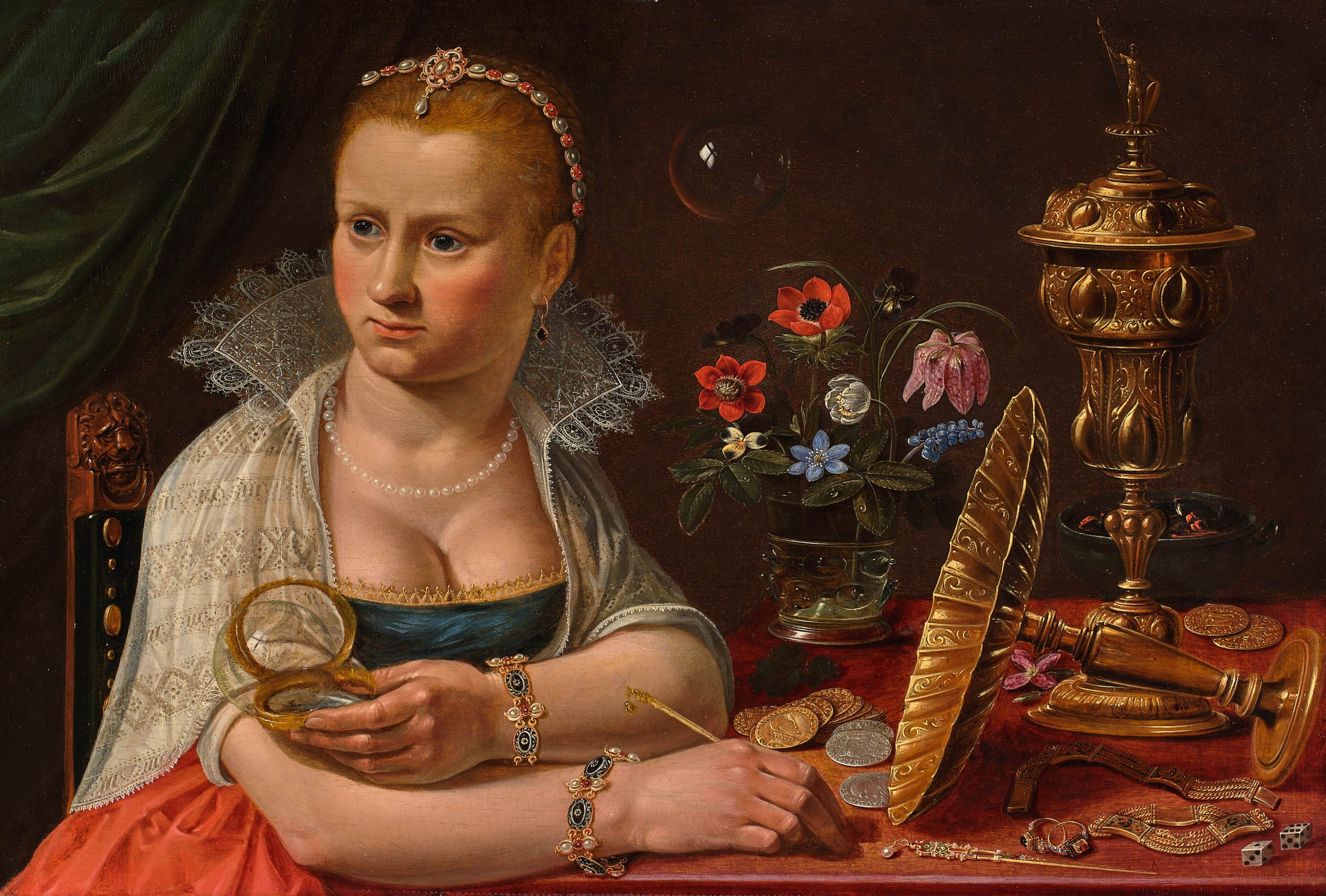
Possible self-portrait of Peeters, in vanitas style, c. 1610

Clara Peeters (Dutch pronunciation: [ˈklaːraː ˈpeːtərs]; fl. 1607–1676) was a Flemish still-life painter from Antwerp who worked in both the Spanish Netherlands and Dutch Republic.

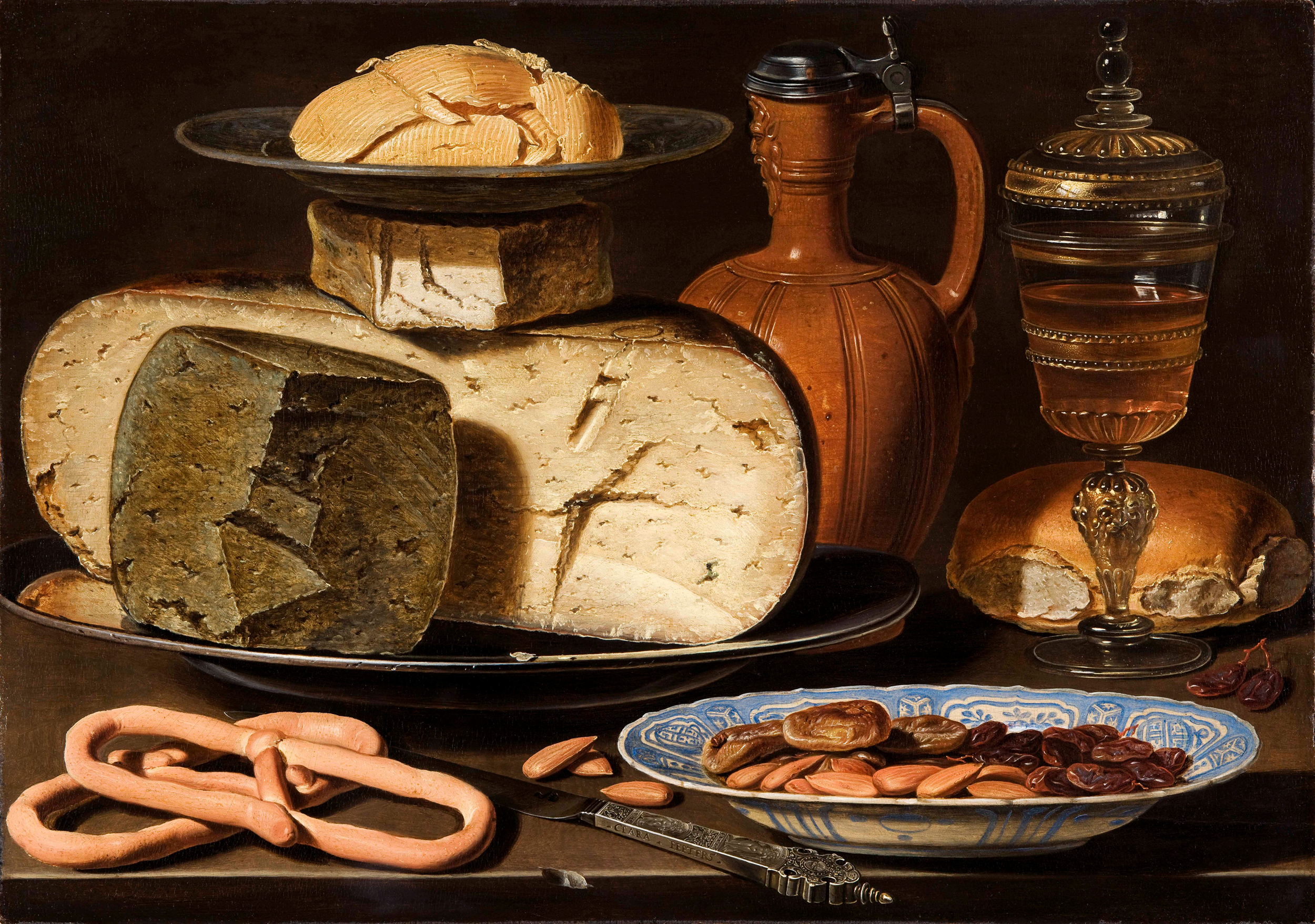
Still Life with Cheeses, Almonds and Pretzels, c. 1615, with the "signed knife", and a reflection of the painter on the rim of the jug lid. Bought by the Mauritshuis in 2012.

Peeters is the best-known female Flemish artist of this era and one of the few women artists working professionally in seventeenth-century Europe, despite restrictions on women's access to artistic training and membership in guilds. Peeters specialized in still-life paintings with food and was prominent among the artists who shaped the traditions of the Netherlandish ontbijtjes, "breakfast pieces," scenes of food and simple vessels, and banketjes, "banquet pieces" with expensive cups and vessels in precious metals.

== Life ==
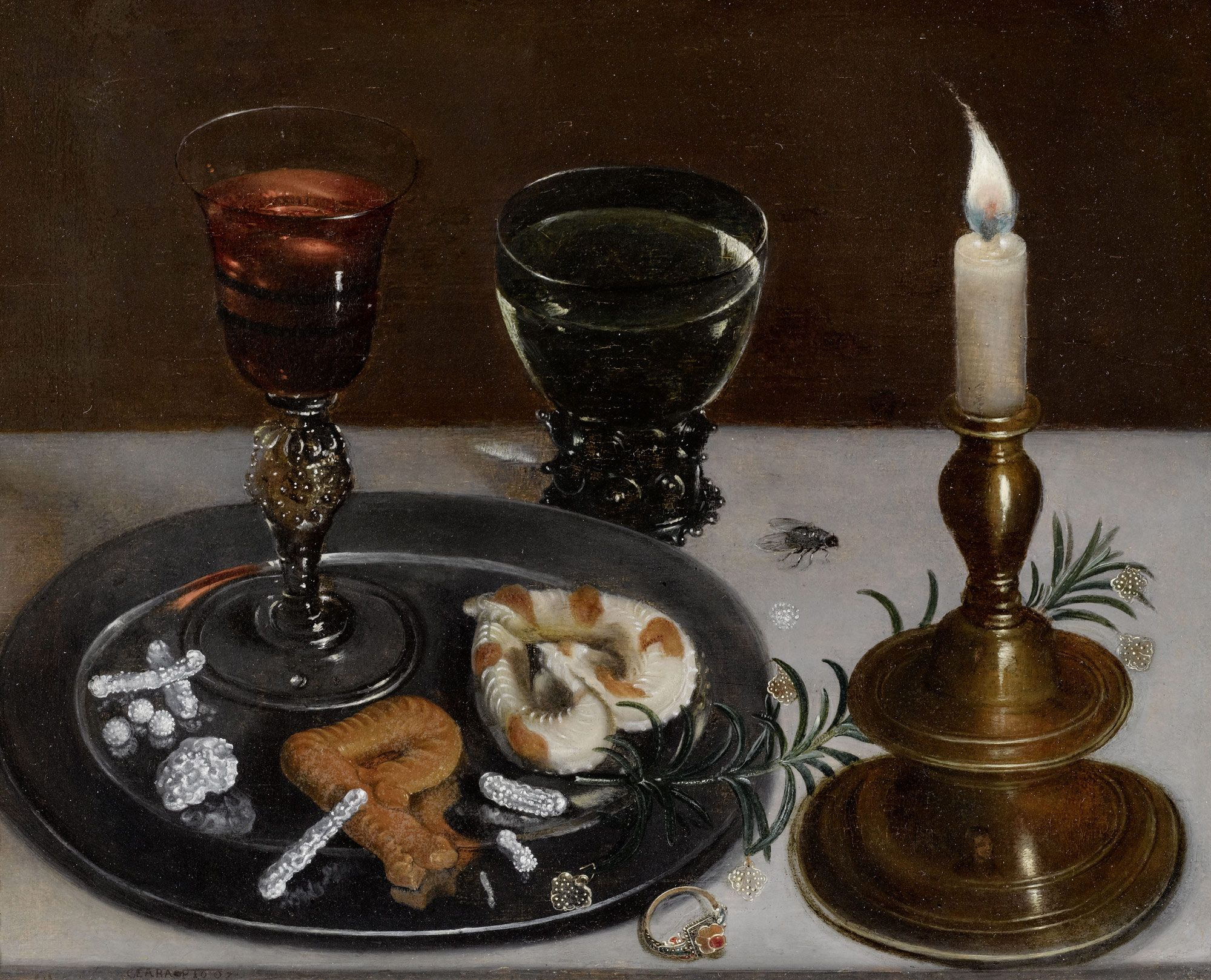
Still Life, 1607, signed "CLARA P 1607", also with a P-shaped pretzel

Details of Peeters' life are unclear. It is generally agreed by scholars that her work points to her being a native of Antwerp. The city of Antwerp's archives hold a record of a Clara Peeters, daughter of Jean (Jan) Peeters, baptized on 15 May 1594 in St. Walburga Church, Antwerp. A second document indicates a marriage between a Clara Peeters and Henricus Joosen on 31 May 1639, in the same church. However, both Clara and especially Peeters were common names in Antwerp. A baptism in 1594 would imply that her 1607-dated paintings were done when she was 12 or 13. Some scholars doubt that those early works could have been done by one so young and have posited that she was born in the 1580s.

Peeters was established in Amsterdam by 1611 and documented in The Hague in 1617. Some have suggested that in light of there not being any evident work by Peeters after 1621, she ceased painting after getting married, as for example Judith Leyster effectively did. Because of the number of apparent copies of her work by various hands, some speculate that she may have headed a small school of artists. No record indicating Peeters' date of death has been found; however, scholars speculate various dates: in or after 1621; after 1654; after 1657; 1659 and 1676.

== Training ==
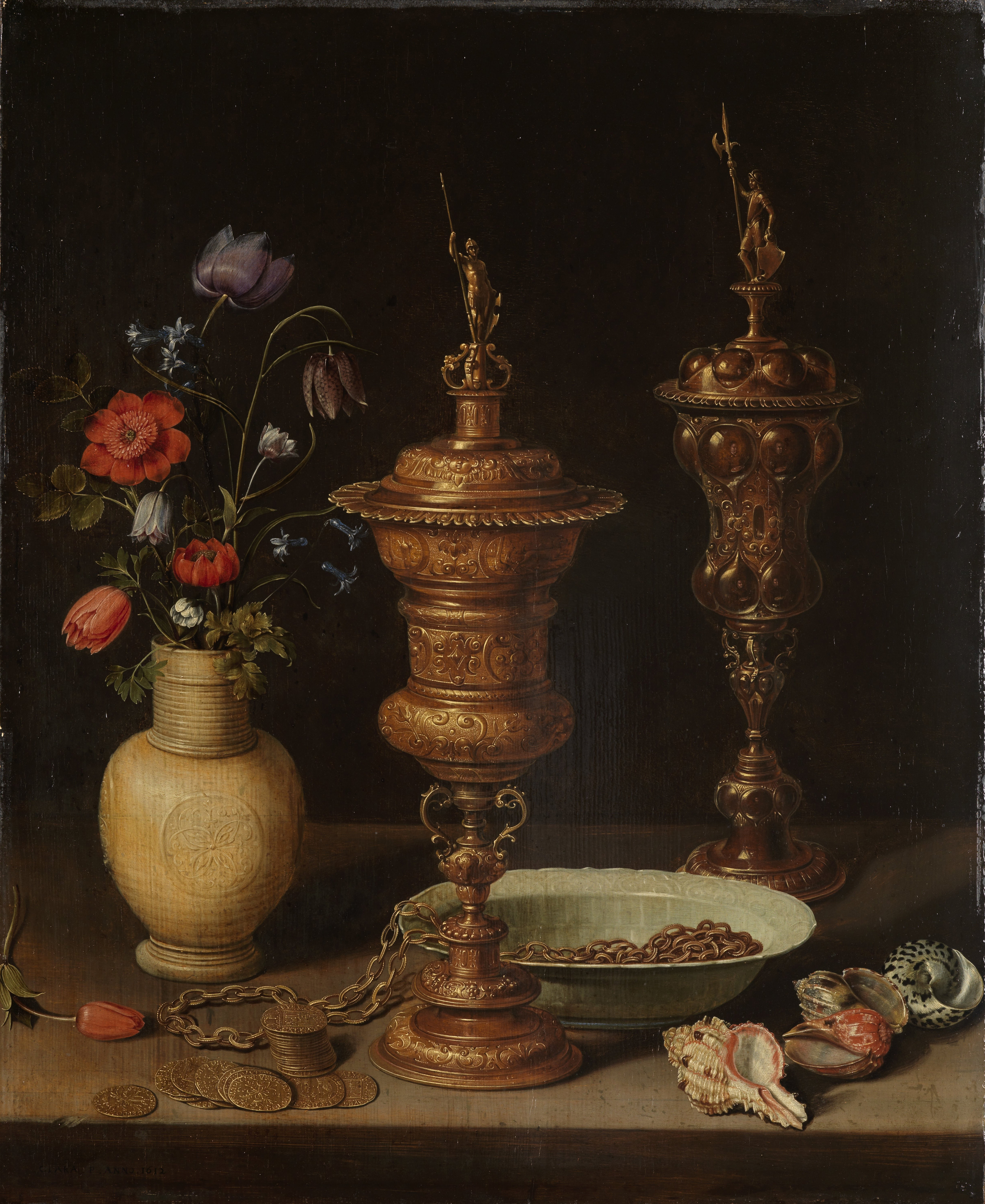
Still Life with Flowers and Gold Cups of Honor, 1612, with reflections of the artist on the bosses of the cup at right

Peeters' first-known painting, signed and dated 1607, reflects the technical and compositional skill of a trained artist. Her style suggests training in Antwerp, an early center of still-life specialization.

While most artists and apprentices were included in records of the local Guild of Saint Luke, no record of Peeters' has been found in Antwerp or centers of art in the Dutch Republic. Scholars speculate that she may have been the daughter of a painter, and thus not required to be included in the apprenticeship records.

Many scholars believe her work closely resembles that of Osias Beert and suggest she may have been his pupil. Beert began his career as a still-life painter when he became a master of the Antwerp guild in 1602. However, none of his works are dated, although some of the copper plates were stamped with dates from 1606 to 1609 by their supplier. She has also been linked to Antwerp artists Hans van Essen and Jan van der Beeck. Jan Bruegel the Elder has also been suggested as a possible teacher.

Although she was not in its records, at least one painting of Peeters bears the stamp of the Antwerp Guild on its back, indicating she may indeed have been a member, or at least worked on panels made by members of the Antwerp Guild.

== Work ==
Peeters signed thirty-one works "CLARA PEETERS" or "CLARA P.", and dated many of them, which leaves a strong record of her work from 1607 to 1621. Eighteen of these were completed by the time she was eighteen years old. In addition, another seventy-six works are speculated to be in her oeuvre, although documentation is lacking to assign them affirmatively to Peeters. Several of her paintings, including two illustrated here, carry the signature represented as an engraved inscription on the side of the handle of the same decorated knife. The knife has two nude female figures on the main face of the handle that is visible, and is typical of the sort of "brides knife" (bruidmessen) Antwerp silversmiths produced around 1595–1600. These may represent a real knife owned by Peeters, or simply an imagined one. Her works were known for incorporating her self-portraits into the reflections or shiny surfaces of everyday objects, such as jugs, fruits and vegetables.

Peeters was among the earliest specialist painters of still lifes and flowers, working while this genre was still emerging. Fewer than ten paintings of flowers and fewer than five of food produced in the Netherlands can be dated before 1608, when she painted her first recorded work. She painted a set of four larger than usual (all 50‒51 × 71‒73 cm) still lifes, three dated 1611, that were in the Spanish royal collection by the following century (now in the Prado). The set includes the earliest still-life of dead game birds, if Jacopo de' Barbari's famous Still-Life with Partridge and Gauntlets (1504, now Munich) from a very different tradition is excepted. The Prado group were split between Spanish palaces in the 18th century, with the earliest inventory record for any being in 1734, when one was rescued in the fire that destroyed the Royal Alcazar of Madrid. Her paintings of fish and game of 1611 appear well before other artists used similar subject matter.

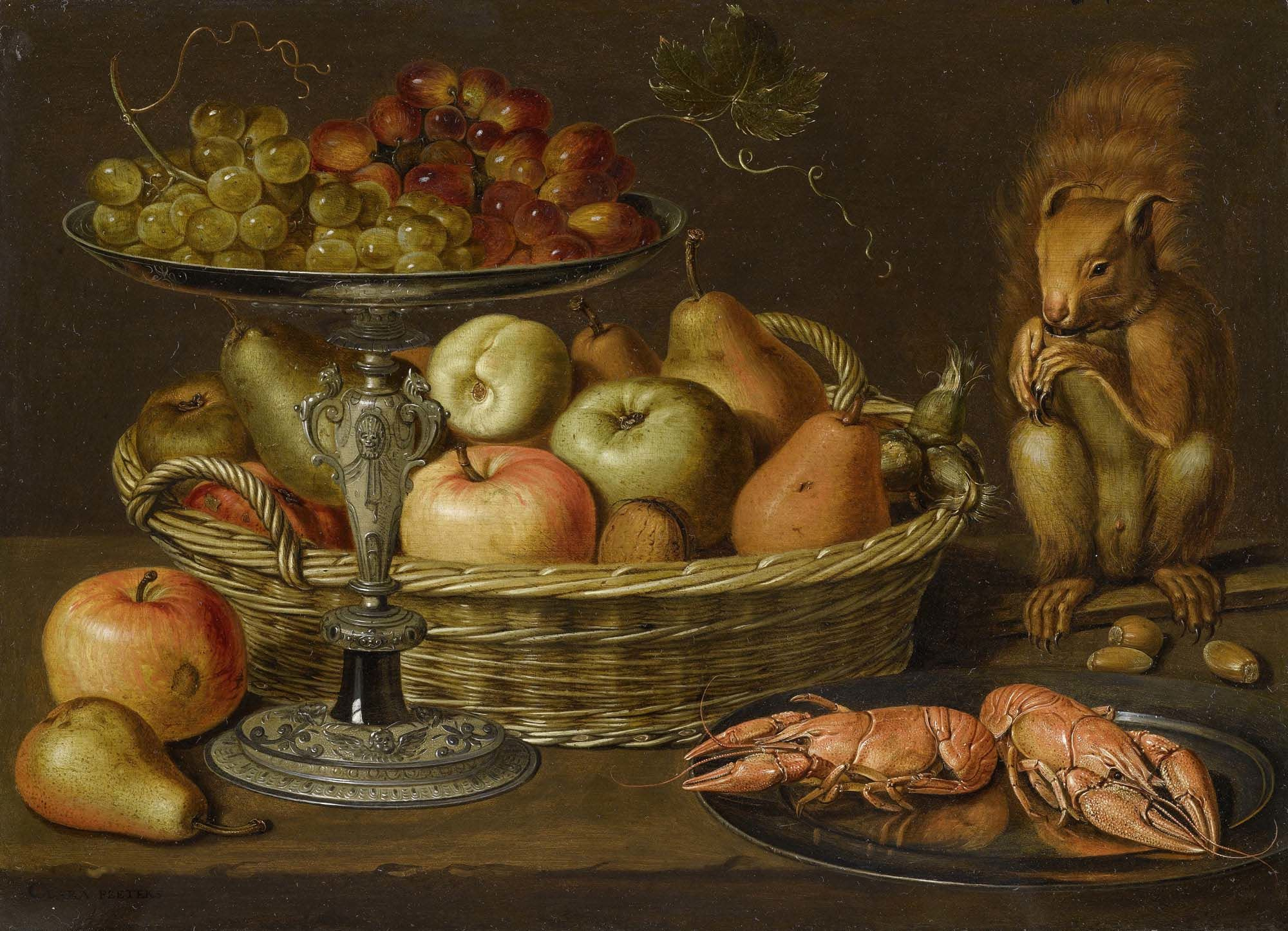
Still Life with Silver-gilt Tazza

In her works before 1620, Peeters was especially fascinated by the fall of light on metal objects – coins, goblets, pewter dishes, etc. – and their reflections. She depicted herself in the reflection of goblets and gilt-cups of many of her paintings, a custom in Netherlandish art dating back over a century, as seen in works like Jan van Eyck's Virgin and Child with Canon van der Paele (1434–1436).

Scholars speculate, based on the continual use of the same motifs and differing quality of work in some of her paintings, that Peeters may have run her own workshop and tasked her students with painting these repetitive motifs.

In 2022 a re-evaluation of Still Life with Small Game and Grapes on a Gilded Tazza, by Cynthia Osiecki, curator of the National Museum of Norway, led to a new attribution to Peeters. The painting had previously been attributed to Ambrosius Brueghel, but after an early-20th-century reassessment, the work was reclassified as being by "anonymous". The inclusion of a tazza in the composition was similar to other Peeters works and there were also similarities in the positioning of the dead birds, grapes and hazelnuts. The edge of the painting, where Peeters would typically have signed her name, had been destroyed by woodworm. The painting will feature in the "~~Woman~~ Painter" exhibition at the museum, curated by Osiecki and opening in October 2026.

== Patrons ==
Although no record of patrons is available, it appears Peeters was a successful artist. Many aspects of her paintings suggest that her paintings would have been created for wealthy collectors, as they are particularly large and depict luxury items of the era. Four of Peeter's early works came to the Prado from the Spanish royal collection, and one is found listed in a collection from 1627, while another is listed in a document of a notary in 1628.

== Market ==
In July 2025 a presumed self-portrait, with a vanitas still life and flowers in a glass vase (c. 1610) from the collection Baron and Baronne Bertrand de Gieywas, was offered for sale at Sotheby's, with a presale estimate of £1.2 - £1.8 million.

== Selected works ==
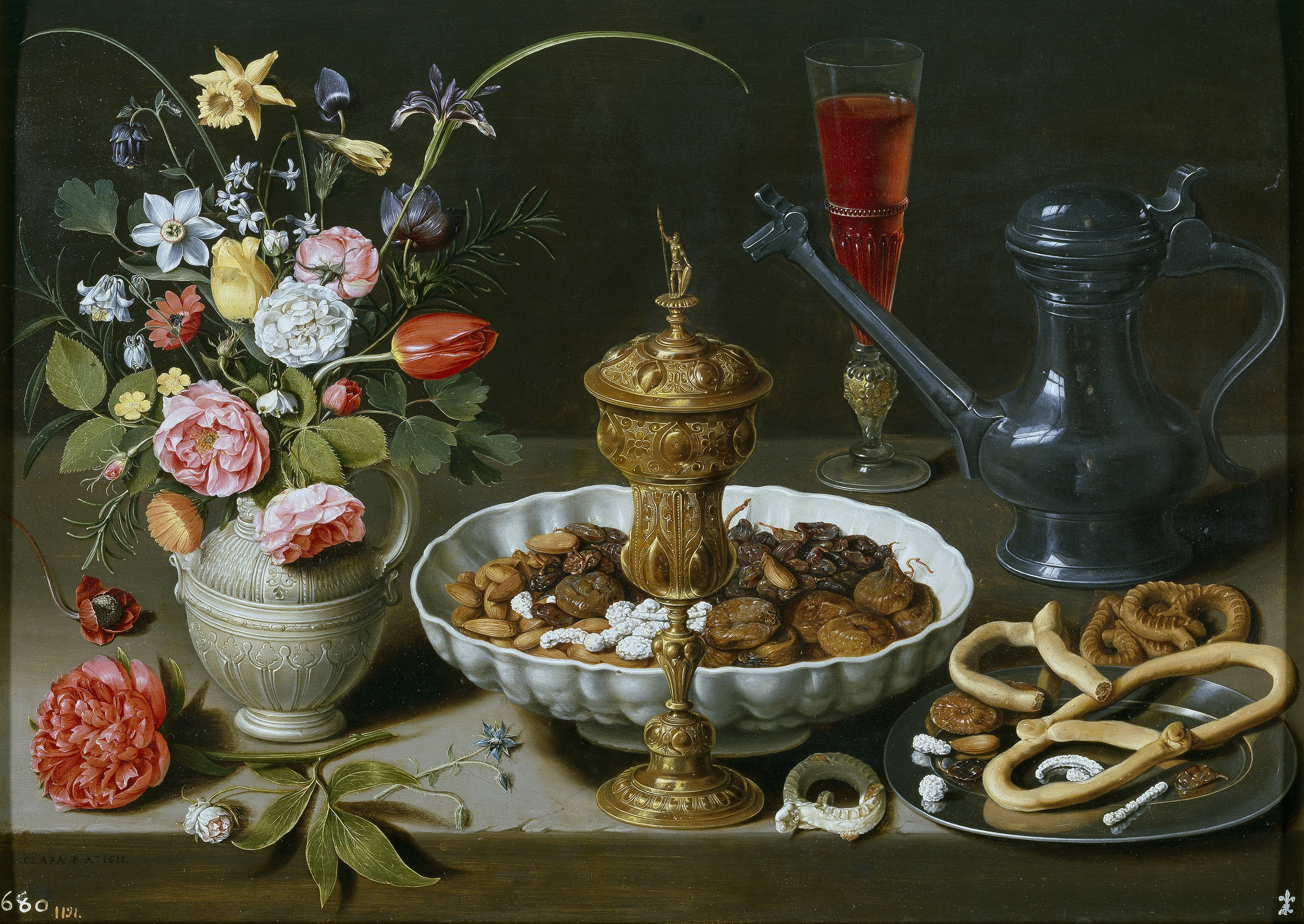
Still Life with Nuts, Candy and Flowers, 1611, with the artist reflected several times in the metal pieces, Museo del Prado

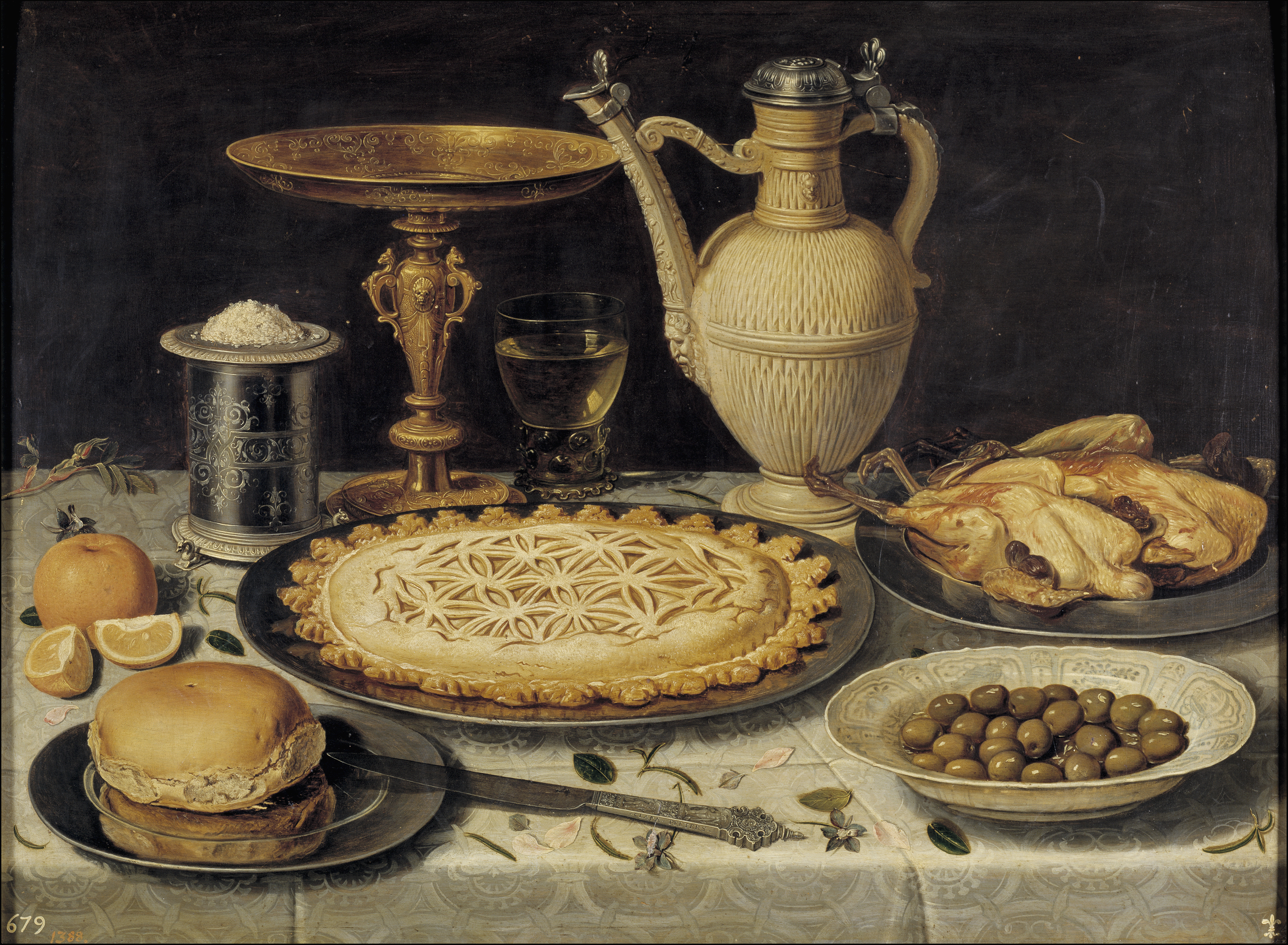
Table with Orange, Olives and Pie, probably 1611, with the "signed knife", Museo del Prado

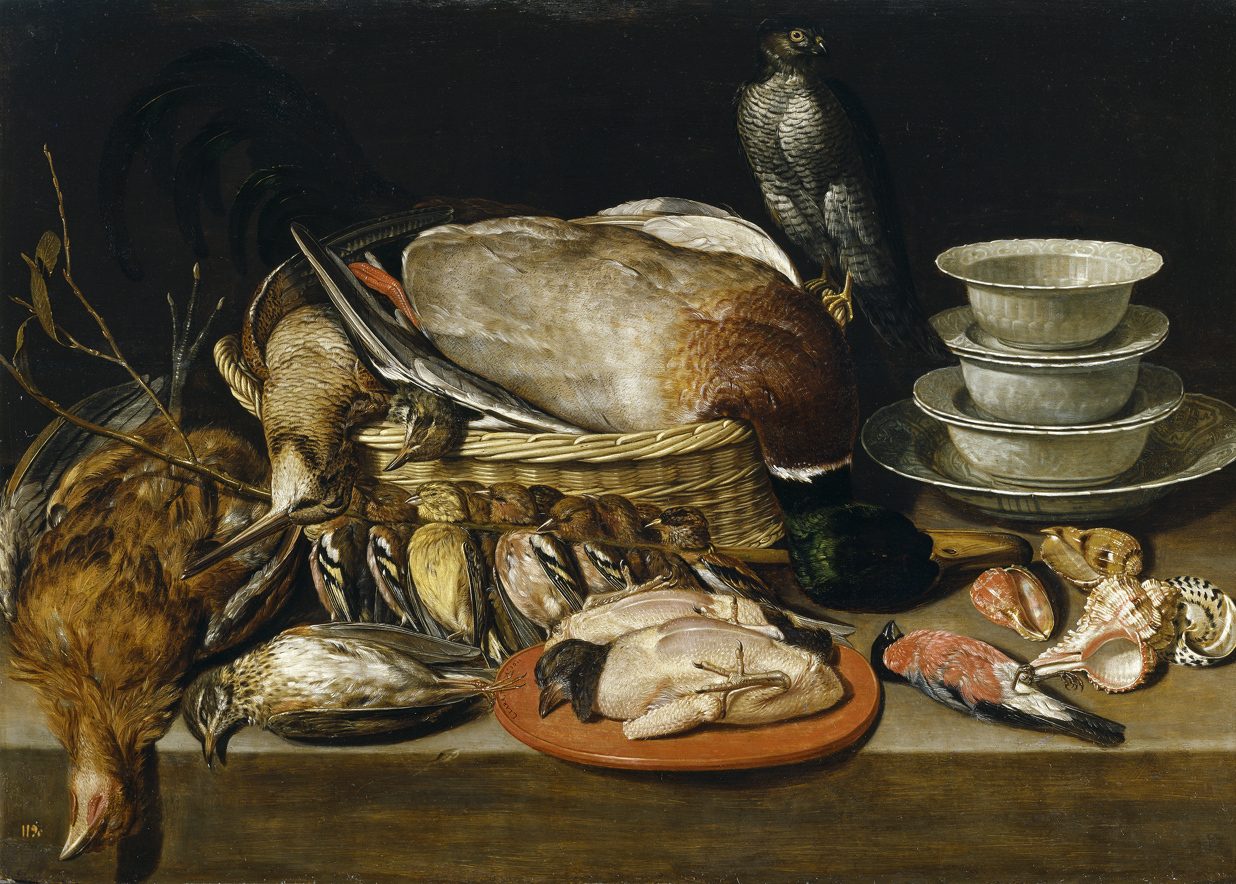
1611, arguably the first still-life of dead game birds, Museo del Prado

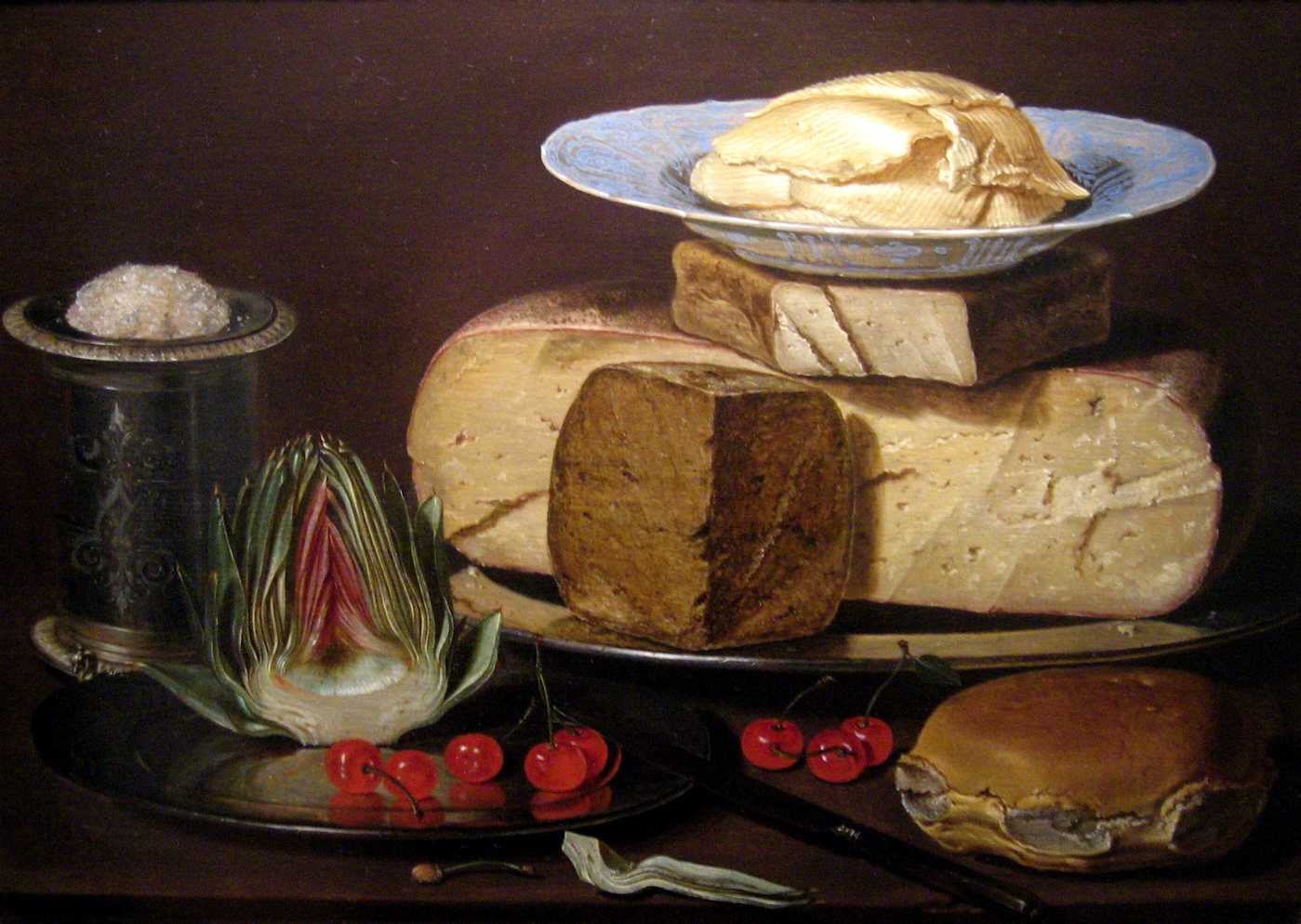
Still Life with Cheeses, Artichoke, and Cherries, 1612–1618, Los Angeles County Museum of Art

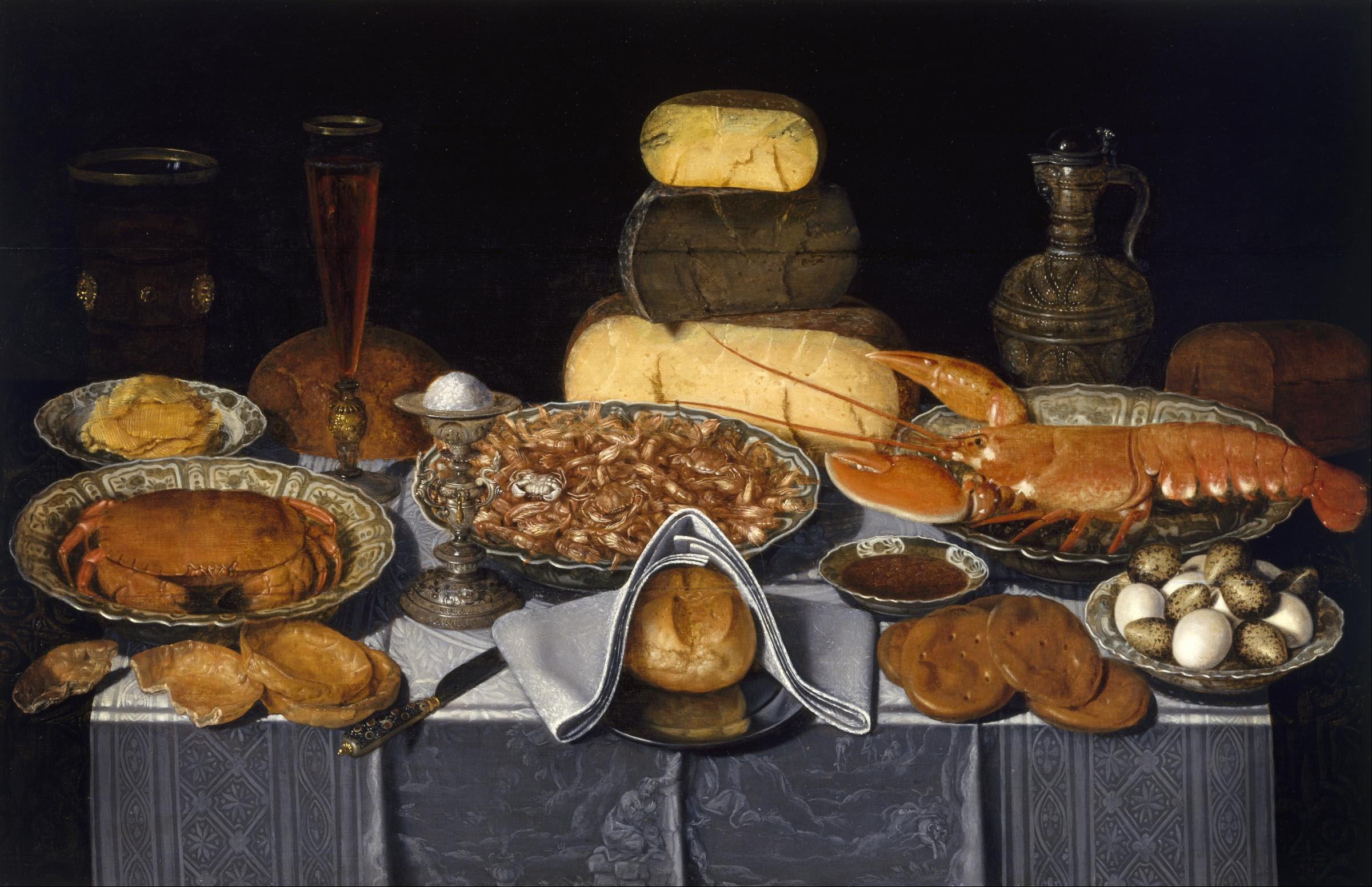
Still Life with Crab, Shrimps and Lobster, 1630–39, unattributed painting in the style of Peeters, Museum of Fine Arts, Houston

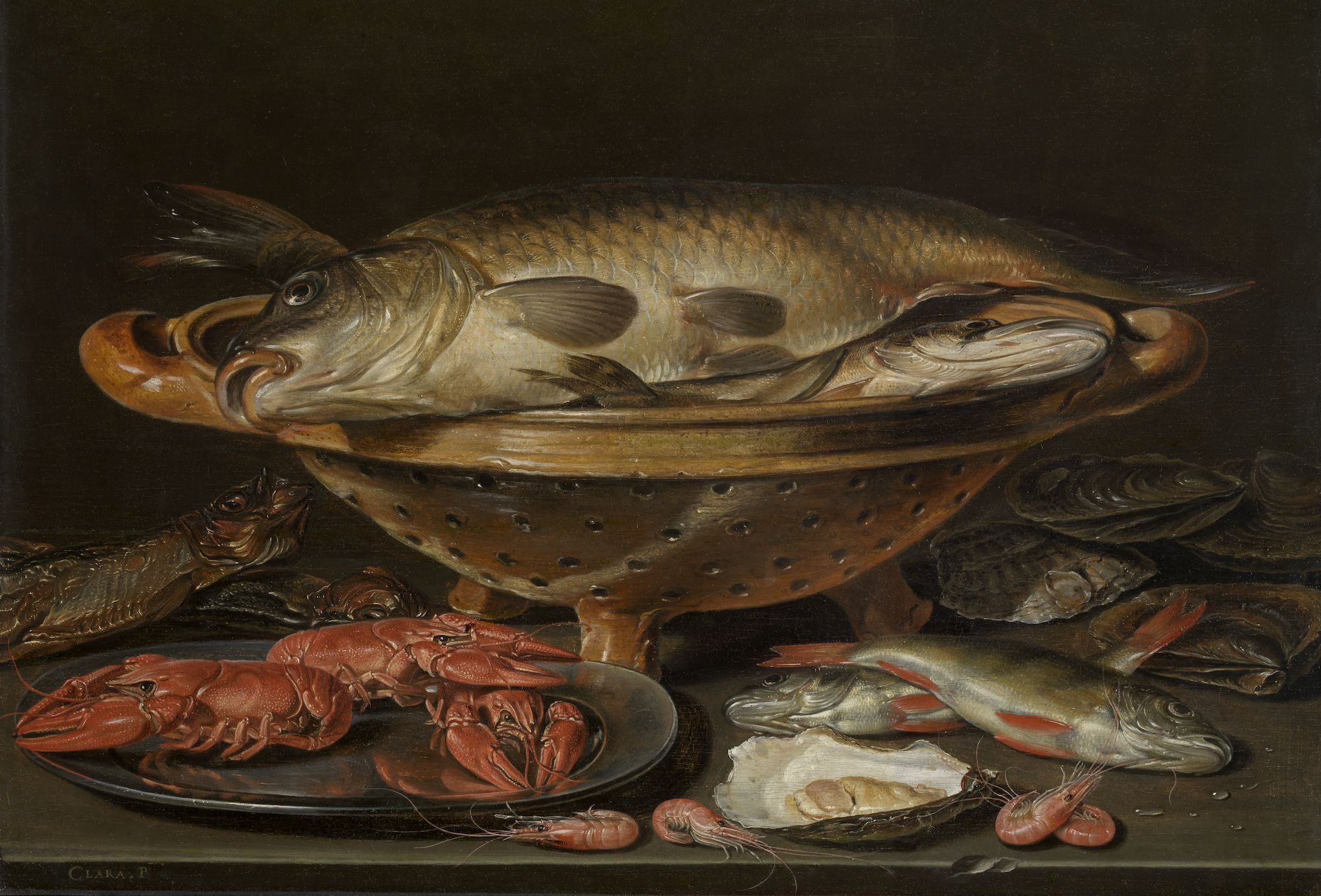
Seafood still life with shrimp and crayfish, c.1612 - c.1621, Royal Museum of Fine Arts Antwerp
